= The Wheel of Life =

Bouldering route in Australia

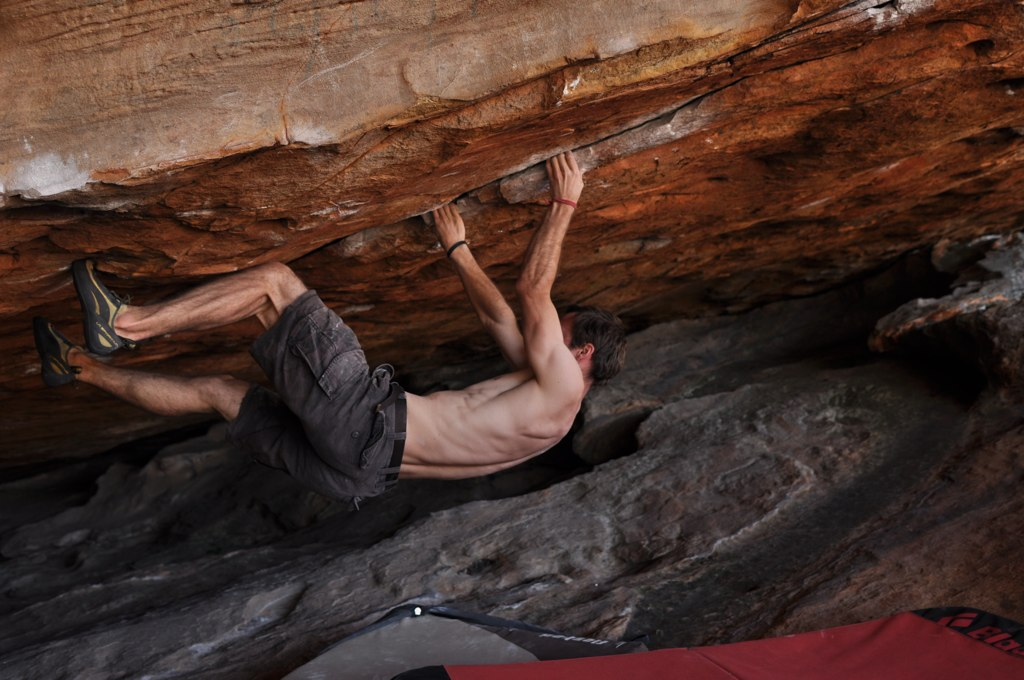
- Climber on the Cave Man V9 (7C) section of The Wheel of Life V15 (8C) route

- Location within Victoria
- Location: Grampians National Park, Australia
- Coordinates: 37°12′28″S 142°23′59″E
- Climbing area: Hollow Mountain Cave
- Route type: Bouldering
- Rock type: Sandstone
- Vertical gain: 21 metres (69 ft) (length of roof)
- Technical grade: 8C (V15) (as boulder route); 9a (5.14d, Ewbank 35) (as sport climb)
- First free ascent: Dai Koyamada, May 12, 2004

The Wheel of Life is a 21-metre (69 ft) long sandstone bouldering route on the roof of the Hollow Mountain Cave in the Grampians of Australia. When first climbed, it was graded at 8C+ (V16), one of the world's first boulder routes at that grade. With repeats, it was graded at 8C (V15), and some consider it to really be a sport climbing traverse route, at the sport grade of 9a (5.14d, Ewbank 35).

== History ==
The sandstone roof of the Hollow Mountain Cave in the Grampians attracted some of the leading boulderers, including Austrian Klem Loskot, Swiss Fred Nicole, and Dutchman Toni Lamprecht, who had created a web of hard bouldering routes. In 2000, when Nicole sent Sleepy Hollow at V12 (8A+), it opened up the possibility of linking up a chain of all the routes across the roof of the cave, namely: Loskot's X-treme Cool V9 (7C), Nicole's Sleepy Hollow, Loskot's Cave Man V9 (7C), Loskot's Dead Can't Dance V11 (8A), and finally exiting via Loskot's Rave Heart V8 (7B/7B+).

Japanese climber Dai Koyamada traveled to the Hollow Mountain Cave in April 2004, with a plan to spend over 50 days bouldering in the area and working on the full link-up. As well as repeating many routes and creating many new routes in the area, he linked up Sleepy Hollow, Cave Man and Dead Can't Dance into a route he called Sleepy Rave and graded at V15 (8C). On May 12, 2004, Koyamada completed the full 70-move link-up and called it The Wheel of Life and proposed a boulder grade of V16 (8C+), which would have made it the world's first boulder at that grade.

It took three years for the first repeat, which was by Australian climber Chris Webb Parsons in 2007. On the recovery path from a serious injury, American climber Ethan Pringle made the third ascent in 2010 and suggested that the significant length of the route made it more akin to a sport climbing route, which he felt could be at sport-grade 9a (5.14d). American climber Dave Graham made the sixth ascent in 2012 and said that "For myself, it's not possible to compare it to other boulder problems, due to its length. I must regard it as a [sport] route", and that "The breakdown of the climb puts it in a league above 9a's that I have climbed, which makes me believe its 9a+". In 2013, American climber Daniel Woods made the ninth ascent and felt that it was no harder than V15 (8C) as a boulder route, or 9a (5.14d, Ewbank 35) as a sport climbing route, because of the rests between sections.

Wood's grading became the consensus for the route, and by 2016, the additional development of kneepads that can be used for extended knee bar rests between the sections, has if anything slightly further softened the consensus grade.

== Variations ==
In November 2012, Australian climber James Kassey linked The Wheel of Life to Amniotic World V9 (7C), and called it The Wheel of Life Direct. Kassey's variation was repeated in 2015 by Dutch climber Jorg Verhoeven, who felt that it did not change the then consensus grading of V15 (8C) (as a boulder route) or 9a (5.14d, Ewbank 35) (as a sport climbing route).

== Ascents ==
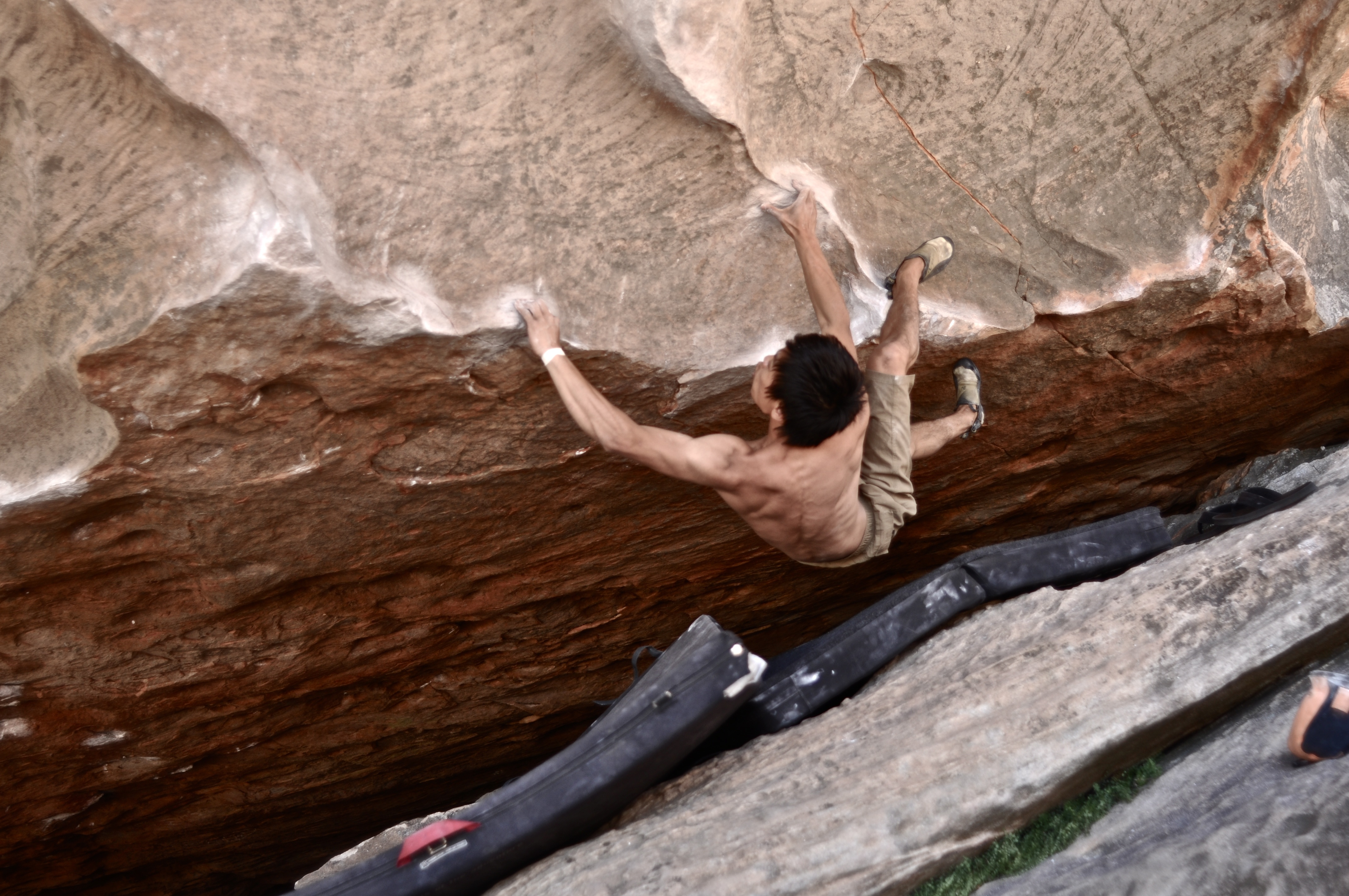
Climber on the Rave Heart V8 (7B/7B+) section of The Wheel of Life, about to leave the cave

The Wheel of Life has been ascended by:

- 1st. Dai Koyamada on May 12, 2004
- 2nd. Chris Webb (now Taylor) Parsons on October 13, 2007
- 3rd. Ethan Pringle in June 2010
- 4th. James Kassay in September 2011
  - In November 2012, Kassy linked it to Amniotic World (V9) to create The Wheel of Life Direct.
- 5th. Ben Cossey on 30 October 2011
- 6th. Dave Graham in June 2012
- 7th. Ian Dory in June 2012.
- 8th. Alexander Megos in July 2013
- 9th. Daniel Woods in July 2013
- 10th. Jorg Verhoeven in November 2015; also made 2nd ascent of Kassy's The Wheel of Life Direct
- 11th. Alex Barrows in May 2016
- 12th. Tom O'Halloran in October 2017
- 13th. Jake Bresnehan in September 2018
- 14th. Matt Hoschke in Feb 2019

== Filmography ==
- Documentary on Koyamada's the first ascent: Naito Naoya (Director), Chie Sasak (Director) (2004). The Wheel of Life – Dai Koyamada (Motion picture). Frontier Spirit Productions.
- Recorded send of Ian Dory - Ian Dory sending The Wheel Of Life, Hollow Mountain Cave, The Grampians

== See also ==
- History of rock climbing
- List of grade milestones in rock climbing
- Dreamtime, famous V15 (8C) boulder in Cresciano, Switzerland
- Midnight Lightning, famous V8 (7B/7B+) boulder in Camp 4 (Yosemite)
- The Mandala, famous V12 (8A+) boulder at The Buttermilks
