= Beta (climbing) =

Climbing term for route information

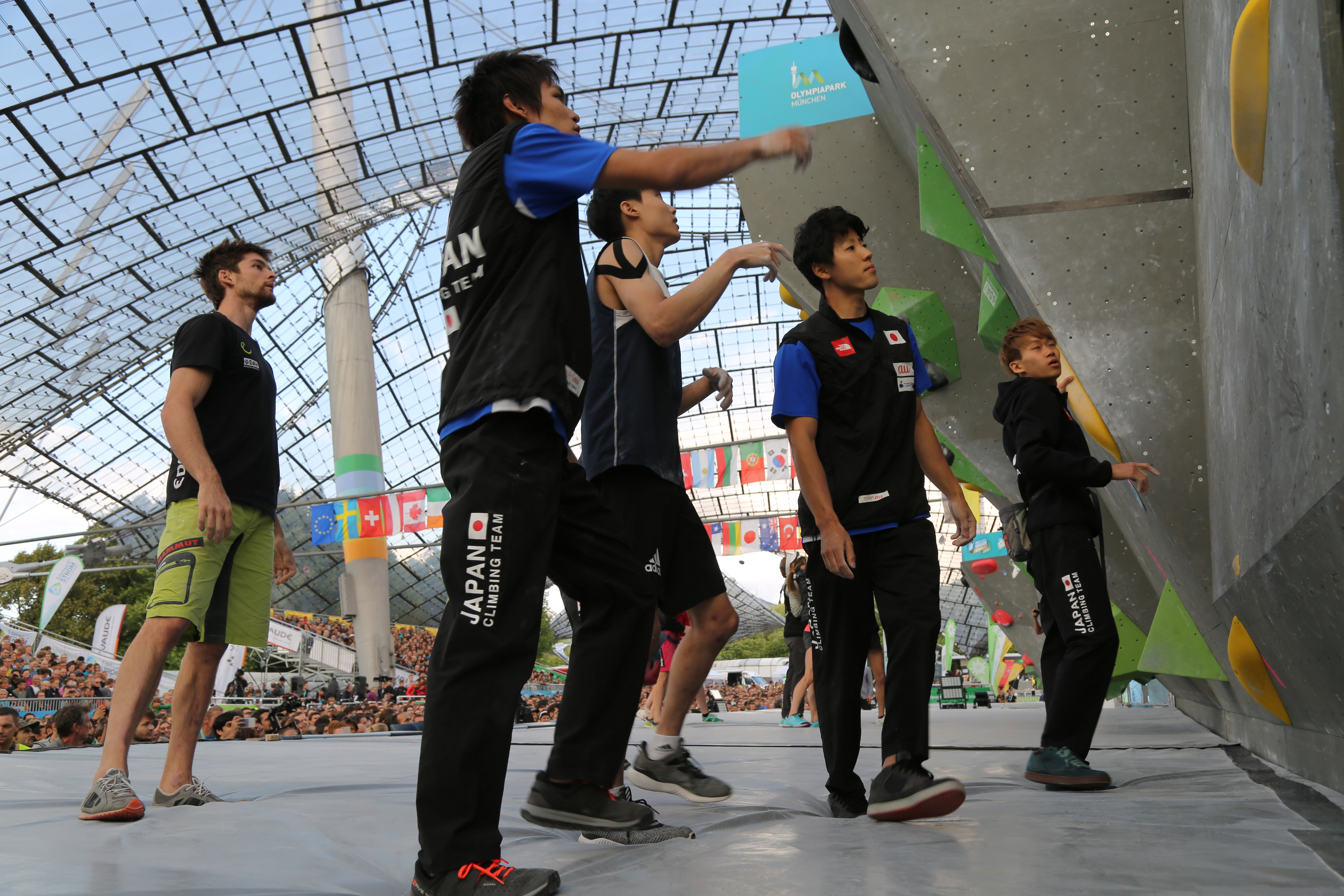
Competition bouldering climbers at the IFSC World Cup 2017 pre-inspecting the boulder problems to figure out the beta.

Beta is a climbing term that designates information about how to ascend a climbing route, and the specific climbing techniques required—and how to apply them—to overcome the key challenges encountered. Traditionally sourced in climbing guidebooks, online databases and apps now provide detailed climbing beta. The term is attributed to New Jersey climber Jack Mileski.

When a climber completes a route on their first attempt and without falling, it is called an onsight if they had no beta, or a flash if they had beta (a completion after several failed attempts is called a redpoint). New grade milestones in the on-sighting and flashing of routes are actively followed in the climbing media. The discovery of new beta has led to the re-grading of notable and historic climbing routes.

== Description ==
The complexity of beta can range from a small hint about a difficult section (i.e. referred to as "some" beta), to a step-by-step instruction of the entire climb (i.e. referred to as "the" beta). Sometimes there is more than one way to climb a route and thus more than one beta; climbers can follow different route beta depending on their body shape (e.g. whether they have a long or short reach), and/or their preferred style and technique (e.g. may not have the power to overcome a roof, and thus take a different route). Multiple route options–and thus betas–are particularly common on long multi-pitch climbing and big wall climbing routes, for example on the famous Yosemite route Freerider and its optional V7 (7A+) "Huber boulder problem".

In rock climbing, beta can include background information about a route's grade of difficulty (e.g. what drove the grade), detailed aspects about the crux (e.g. "you need to use your left hand, not your right"), the climbing style needed (e.g. long reaches or tiny crimps), the best way to protect the route (e.g. "insert a number 4 SLCD before attempting the crack"), and specific information about hand or foot holds. For mountaineering and alpine climbing, beta may include information about the approach (e.g. crossing bergschrunds), the ability to find the correct route (e.g. "avoid the crack system on the left"), the feasibility of exiting the route before completing it (e.g. key abseils to set up), and the situation regarding rock-fall and avalanche dangers.

Sometimes climbers display beta on a graphical beta-map (a more detailed move-by-move instruction guide than the route topo). Advanced climbers on very difficult routes try to connect the beta of their route to their muscle memory, so they don't have to think about the next move.

Competition climbers are given a fixed time to inspect the route as a group before the competition, but once the climbing begins, they must remain in the isolation zone away from the climbing wall, to prevent them learning more beta from watching fellow competitors attempting the route. During a time-limited pre-competition inspection, climbers try to work out the beta starting from the top of the route and working down, to avoid losing time.

=== Derived terms ===
The derived term spraying beta designates when a third party begins to impart unwanted beta without being asked for it (which can ruin an onsight attempt). The term breaking beta designates when a climber is able to bypass or skip a whole sequence of moves (e.g. using a dyno).

== Access ==
YouTube videos can have extensive beta. Example of Daniel Woods and Dave Graham on Thor's Hammer 9a+ (5.15a) in the Hanshelleren Cave in Norway

The official climbing guidebooks were the first systematic forms of beta. The beta in these physical climbing guidebooks was limited to the basic details of the climbing route (e.g. length, grade, direction/topo etc.) so as to manage the size of the guidebook and avoid giving so much information that would spoil an onsight attempt. With the development of the internet, a significant quantity of more detailed beta began to accumulate (e.g. complete YouTube videos on how to climb a specific route, per example opposite).

Both established climbing guidebook publishers (e.g. 'RockFax' in Europe), and the new dedicated online climbing databases (e.g. Mountain Project and 'theCrag.com'), began to aggregate this detailed beta in online databases and apps, alongside the traditional guidebook-type information. Open-source beta databases such as 'OpenBeta' also aggregate user-generated climbing beta.

== Origin ==
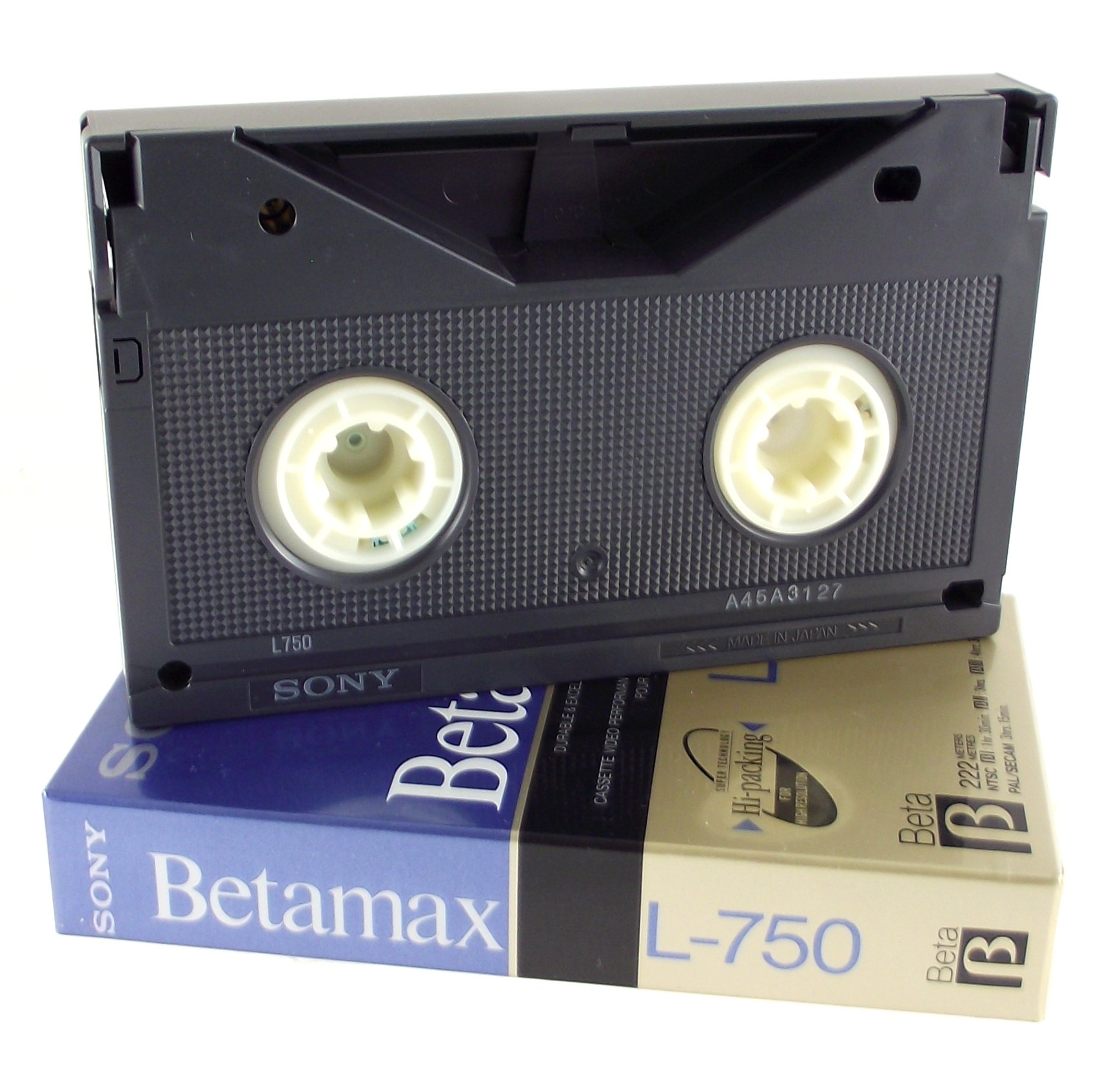
A Betamax cassette

The original use of the term beta in climbing is generally attributed to the late New Jersey climber Jack Mileski, who climbed predominantly in the Shawangunks during the 1980s and early 1990s (before his murder by his girlfriend). "Beta" is short for Betamax, an early videotape format. Reputedly, Mileski had a near photographic recall of many routes in the Gunks and would share said info with his friends while they climbed.

== Onsights and flashes ==
When climbers are attempting a graded climbing route for their first time, a distinction is made on whether they complete the route on their first attempt without falling. This distinction is further split depending on whether they had prior beta about the route. Where they had no beta, their ascent is called an onsight, and where they had prior beta, it is called a flash.

The climbing media records new grade milestones of onsights and flashes of major sport climbing routes. As of 2023, the highest milestone in flashing a route was by Czech climber Adam Ondra who in 2018, became the first-ever climber in history to flash a 9a+ (5.15a) graded sport climbing route, Super Crackinette. As of 2025, the highest milestone for on-sighting a route was set by German climber Alex Megos who in 2013, became the first-ever climber in history to onsight a 9a (5.14d) graded sport climbing route, Estado Critico. In 2025, Italian climber Laura Rogora became the first-ever female climber to onsight (Ultimate Sacrifice in 2025) an 8c+ (5.14c) graded sport climbing route.

== Effect on re-grading ==
When a climber has made the first ascent (or first free ascent) of a climbing route, they will assign a technical grade to the route to reflect the difficulties encountered. This grade will be a function of the particular beta that the climber used to make their first ascent. As subsequent climbers repeat the new route, they may discover new beta that makes the route easier and thus lowers its grade. Notable examples include the 2021 downgrading of Bibiliographie from 9c (5.15d)–the world's highest grade at the time–to 9b+ (5.15c) after a slightly easier sequence of moves was worked out for the crux. New beta can also emerge from new climbing techniques; examples being the introduction of knee pads that enabled knee bar rests, and use of more advanced heel hooks. In 2002, the famous bouldering route Dreamtime was downgraded from being the world's first-ever V15 (8C) graded boulder to being grade V14 (8B+), with the discovery of new beta that used heel hooks to make the route slightly easier, thus reducing the grade.

== Notable beta ==
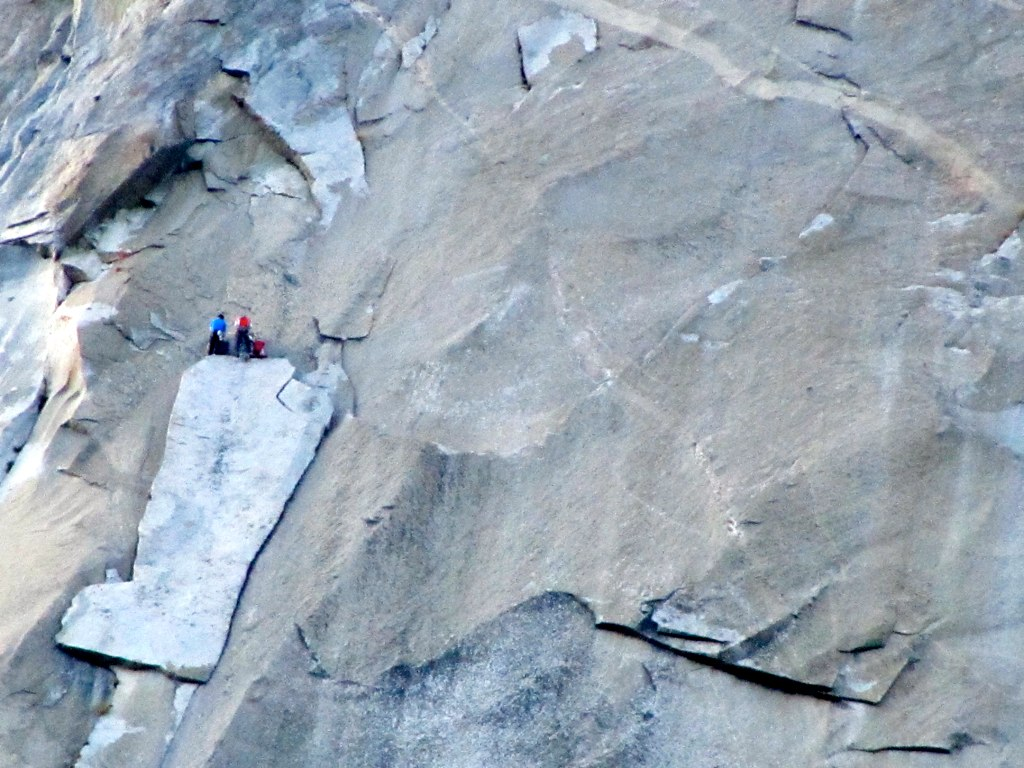
Climbers standing on the top of 'Boot Flake' on El Capitan, preparing to do the "King Swing" pendulum

Certain famous climbs have beta around very specific necessary sequences of movements or actions that have in themselves become notable:

- "Rose Move". In 1985, leading French climber Antoine Le Menestrel chipped out a series of tiny pockets on a limestone sport climbing route in Buoux to create La Rose et le Vampire, only the fourth-ever route at the grade of 8b (5.13d) in climbing history. The elegant sequence of cross-over movements needed to overcome its crux became known as the "Rose Move".
- "King Swing". One of the most famous pieces of beta in big wall climbing is the 100-foot pendulum that climbers need to execute to move from a crack-system that ends at 'Boot Flake' into a new crack-system that starts at 'Eagle Ledge' on the Nose (VI 5.9 C2) of El Capitan in Yosemite.

== See also ==
- Glossary of climbing terms
- List of grade milestones in rock climbing
- Redpoint (climbing)
