= Dai Koyamada =

Japanese rock climber (born 1976)

Dai Koyamada (小山田大)
Personal information
- Born: 23 August 1976 (age 49) Kagoshima Prefecture, Japan
- Occupation: Professional rock climber
- Height: 5 ft 5 in (165 cm)
- Weight: 128 lb (58 kg)
- Website: koyamada.dai.hiho.jp

Climbing career
- Type of climber: Sport climbing; Bouldering; Competition climbing
- Highest grade: Bouldering: V16 (8C+)
- First ascents: The Wheel of Life (V15, 2004); The Story of Two Worlds Low Start (V16, 2012)
- Updated on 19 April 2017

Dai Koyamada (Japanese: 小山田大, born 23 August 1976) is a Japanese rock climber and known as one of the leading boulderers of his generation who established some of the first-ever boulder problems at 8C (V15). He has also established and repeated, some of the hardest sport climbs in the world.

== Early life ==
Dai was born on 23 August 1976 in Kagoshima Prefecture and started climbing in 1993.

== Climbing career ==
=== Competition climbing ===
In 1996, Koyamada won the Japanese National Championship. This is the event that allowed him to become a professional rock climber. Four years later in 2000 Koyamada left the competition climbing circuit because he realized "The real nature of my climbing resides in crags".

=== Rock climbing ===
Koyamada came to wider prominence in sport climbing when in 2001, he completed the first ascent (FA) of Logical Progression, a 9a (5.14d) sport climb in Joyama, Japan, which was considered one of the most difficult in the world at the time.

In 2004, Koyamada came to international prominence when he travelled to the Hollow Mountain Cave in the Grampians National Park in Australia, and created several new extreme bouldering routes that were considered to be amongst the world's first-ever at the 8C+ (V16) grade, most notably Sleepy Rave, and The Wheel of Life. Both have seen their grades softened to 8B (V13) and 8C (V15) respectively. Later in 2004, Koyamada traveled to Switzerland and repeated Fred Nicole's Dreamtime on November 9, then one of the hardest boulder problems in the world, and one of the first boulders to receive a 8C (V15).

On October 15, 2005, Koyamada repeated the famous sport climbing route, Action Directe 9a (5.14d), in the Frankenjura, Germany and proclaimed it harder than any other route that he has climbed. In a 2017 interview, Koymada called his ascent of Action Directe as "the outstanding turning point in my climbing career".

On April 4, 2017, at the age of 40, Koyamada climbed a new personal best with the first ascent of the boulder, Nayuta 8C+ (V16) in Gero, Japan.

== Notable ascents ==
=== Boulder problems ===
V16 (8C+):

- Nayuta (那由多) – Gero (JPN) – 4 April 2017 – FA
- The Story of Two Worlds Low Start – Cresciano (SUI) – 22 March 2012 – Following an internet controversy contesting Koyamada's hand positions to start the boulder problem in 2010, Koyamada returned to honor his name and establish his own, more difficult low start.

V15 (8C):

- Nehanna (ネハンナ) – Gero (JPN) – 4 June 2016 – FA
- Rokudou (六道) – Toyamagawa (JPN) – 25 March 2016 – FA
- Meikyoushisui (明鏡止水) – Toyamagawa (JPN) – 18 March 2016 – Second ascent 8B+/8C.
- Horizon (ホライゾン) – Mt. Hiei (JPN) – 8 May 2015 – FA
- Kawaki no umi / Sea of Dry (乾きの海) – Minamata (JPN) – 31 March 2014 – FA, 8B+/8C.
- Vanitas (ヴァニタス) – Horai (JPN) – 6 February 2014 – FA
- Eternal (エターナル) – Hinokage (JPN) – 1 May 2013 – FA
- Four Dimensional (4次元) – Hinokage (JPN) – 21 March 2013 – FA, 8B+/8C.
- Floating World (浮世) – Ena (JPN) – 7 November 2012 – FA
- Der mit dem Fels tanzt -Chironico (SUI) – 28 October 2012 – Second Ascent
- Ukiyo (浮世) – Ena (JPN) – 12 July 2012 – FA
- Daedalus Direct – Sustenpass (SUI) – 4 October 2004 – FA, 8B+/8C
- In Search of Time Lost – Magic Wood (SUI) – 28 August 2011 – Second Ascent
- The Story of Two Worlds – Cresciano (SUI) – 13 May 2010 -Second ascent of Dave Graham's classic boulder put up in 2005.
- Idea (イデア) – Horai (JPN) – 8 February 2010 – FA
- Karamu – Japan (JPN) – 28 April 2009 – FA
- Epitaph – Hourai (JPN) – 20 January 2009 – This first ascent took him over a year to complete, and he says it's the most beautiful line he has ever made the first ascent on.
- Euphoria (ユーフォリア) – Yatsue (JPN) – 20 March 2008 – FA
- Bongo (ボンゴ) – Frankenjura (GER) – 28 October 2007 – FA, 40+ move roof climb.
- Angama – Fontainebleau (FR) – 24 October 2006 – FA, Traverse
- Hyper Ballad – Shiobara (JPN) – 31 March 2006 – FA
- Hydrangea – Shiobara (JPN) – 22 April 2005 – First ascent by adding a sit-start to his Hydra (V13/8B, FA on 2004 December 20).
- Dreamtime – Cresciano (SUI) – 9 November 2004 – Although Dai has logged this ascent as V14 it was considered V15 at the time prior to broken holds.
- The Wheel of Life – Grampians (AUS) – 12 May 2004 – FA
- Methuselahzation (メトセラゼーション) – Yatsue (JPN) – 8 February 2004 – FA
- Byaku-dou – Hourai (JPN) – 11 November 2003 – first ascent.
- Hull Shea Nation (ハルシネーション) – Horai (JPN) – UNKNOWN – FA

V14 (8B+):

- Agartha – Toyota (JPN) – 12 April 2011 – 8B+(V14) first ascent.
- Big Paw – Chironico (SUI) – 13 November 2010 – At the time of ascent considered 8C(V15) but has subsequently been downgraded.

=== Redpointed routes ===
9a (5.14d):

- Action Directe – Frankenjura (GER) – 15 October 2005 – Dai proclaimed it to be his most difficult climb yet.

- Hugh – Les Eaux Claire (FRA) – 1 November 2002 – first ascent (FA) by Fred Rouhling in 1993.

- Logical Progression – Joyama (JPN) – 27 November 2001 – first ascent (FA) of 9a (5.14d) sport climb.
