= Jimmy Webb (climber) =

American rock climber (born 1987)

Personal information
- Born: November 7, 1987 (age 38) Maryville, Tennessee, U.S.
- Occupation: Professional rock climber

Climbing career
- Type of climber: Boulderer
- Highest grade: Redpoint: 5.15a (9a+); Onsight/Flash: 5.14a (8b+); Bouldering: V16 (8C+)
- First ascents: V16 (8C+): Sleepwalker, Ephyra
- Updated on May 24, 2019

Jimmy Webb (born November 7, 1987) is an American professional rock climber specializing in bouldering. He is one of a handful of climbers who have climbed the boulder grade V16 (8C+).

Webb was the men's winner of the 2013 Psicobloc Masters Series held in Park City, Utah. He beat several of the world's best climbers to win the event, including Chris Sharma, Daniel Woods, Dave Graham, and Tommy Caldwell. In spring 2014, Webb climbed The Understanding and Practice of the Wild, both V15 (8C) routes, within a week of each other. In November 2014, he repeated Defying Gravity, which was first climbed by Daniel Woods a year before.

Webb has flashed six boulder problems graded V13 (8B) or higher. Dead Point Magazine says "it’s not a stretch to consider Jimmy the world’s best flash boulderer."

On December 15, 2018, after 11 days of effort, Webb completed the first ascent of Sleepwalker in Black Velvet Canyon, Red Rocks, suggesting a grade of V16 (8C+); the grade was confirmed by Daniel Woods in January 2019. This marked his second V16, along with Creature from the Black Lagoon in Rocky Mountain National Park. A few months later he got his third V16 with Ephyra, in Chironico.

== Notable ascents ==
=== Boulder problems ===
V16 (8C+):

- Insomniac - Colorado (USA) - October 2022 - Third ascent.
- Poison the well - Brione (Switzerland) - March 2020 - Second ascent.
- Off the Wagon Low - Valle Bavona (Switzerland) - February 2020 - Second ascent.
- Ephyra - Chironico (CHE) - March 2019 - First ascent, repeated by Niky Ceria.
- Sleepwalker - Black Velvet Canyon (USA) - December 2018 - First ascent. Repeated by Daniel Woods.
- Creature from the Black Lagoon - Upper Chaos Canyon, (USA) - August 2017 - Third ascent.
- Le Pied à Coulisse - Fontainebleau (France) - February 2016 - Second ascent.
- Livin Large - Rocklands (South Africa) - July 2015 - Second ascent. (Originally graded V15 by Nalle Hukkataival in 2009).

V15 (8C):

- Lucid Dreaming - Bishop (USA) - January 2020 - Fifth ascent.
- Virgo - Tahoe (USA) - October 2019 - First ascent.
- Spray of Light - Rocklands (South Africa) - August 2019.
- The Finnish Line - Rocklands (South Africa) - June 2019 - Seventh ascent.
- Primitivo - Ticino (CHE) - April 2019 - First ascent. Repeated by Giuliano Cameroni.
- From Dirt Grows the Flowers - Chironico (CHE) - March 2019 - First ascent by Dave Graham in 2005.
- The Outer Limits - Tahoe (USA) - May 2018 - First ascent.
- Dreamtime - Cresciano (CHE) - February 2018.
- Kintsugi - Red Rocks (USA) - December 2016 - Second ascent.
- The Big Island - Fontainebleau (France) - February 2016.
- The Game - Colorado (USA) - January 2016.
- The Matriarch - Rocktown (USA) - December 2015 - First ascent.
- Defying Gravity - Thunder Ridge, (USA) - November 2014 - Second ascent.
- The Understanding - Magic Wood (CHE) - April 2014 - Done in one session, First ascent by Nalle Hukkataival.
- Practice of the Wild - Magic Wood (CHE) - April 2014.
- The Multiverse - Wyoming, (USA) - March 2014 - First ascent, unrepeated.
- The Story of Two Worlds - Cresciano (CHE) - March 2014.
- The Nest - Red Rocks (USA) - 2013 - Second ascent.
- Delirium - Mount Evans (USA) - September 2013 - First ascent.
- The Wheel of Wolvo - Mount Evans (USA) - September 2013 - First ascent.
- La Rustica - Val Bavona (CHE) - 2013 - First ascent. (Originally proposed by Webb as V14, but later confirmed as V15 by Nalle Hukkataival and Daniel Woods)

=== Redpointed routes ===
9a+ (5.15a):

- Empath - South Lake Tahoe, California - October 19, 2020.

9a (5.14d):

- Dreamcatcher - Cacodemon boulder (Squamish, CAN) - September 2, 2018.

== Awards ==
- 2013 Psicobloc, Park City, Utah
