= Dreamtime (climb) =

Bouldering route in Switzerland

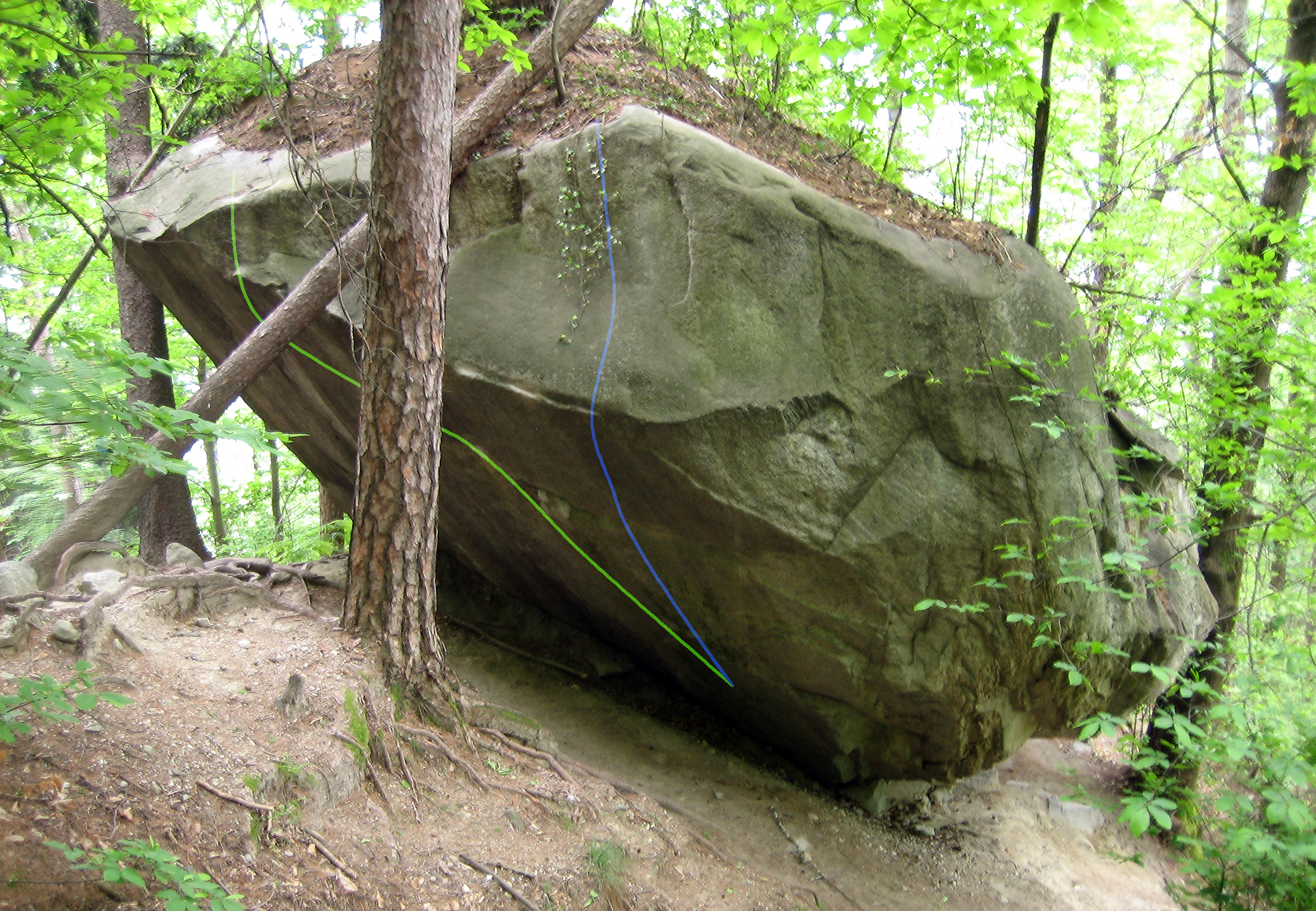
- Dreamtime boulder showing two routes; the Dreamtime (V15) route is the diagonal light green line, and Return of Dreamtime (proposed V16) is the blue line

- Location within Switzerland
- Location: Ticino, Switzerland
- Coordinates: 46°16′59″N 9°00′34″E
- Climbing area: Cresciano
- Route type: Bouldering
- Rock type: Gneiss
- Vertical gain: 10 m (33 ft) (length)
- Technical grade: 8B+ (V14) (pre hold-break); 8C (V15) (post hold-break)
- First free ascent: Fred Nicole, 28 October 2000
- First female free ascent: Michaela Kiersch, November 2024

Dreamtime is a 10-metre (33-foot) long bouldering route, on the boulder of the same name, in the gneiss bouldering area of Cresciano, Switzerland. When first solved in October 2000 by Swiss bouldering pioneer Fred Nicole, it was graded at 8C (V15), making it the world's first-ever boulder route at that grade. With subsequent repeat ascents, it was regraded to 8B+ (V14), but after the breaking of a key hold in 2009, its grade is now considered closer to 8C (V15) again. Dreamtime is one of the most notable bouldering routes in rock climbing history, along with the Yosemite boulder Midnight Lightning, and is renowned for both its beauty and its challenge.

== History ==
In early 2000, Swiss bouldering pioneer Fred Nicole began projecting the boulder Dreamtime in the gneiss bouldering area of Cresciano, envisaging a 10-metre (33-foot) long right-to-left diagonal route from a sit-start that took about 21 movements. After traveling to Australia and then to South Africa, Nicole returned to the route in the autumn and solved it on 28 October 2000. Nicole felt it was his hardest-ever route and proposed a grade of V15 (8C), which was the first-ever boulder route at that grade. Nicole recounted:

We had been in Australia over the summer, so I felt that this name was a good fit. For the Aborigines, 'dreamtime' [sic] means a kind of half-dreaming trance, somewhere between dream and reality, or a dream that becomes reality. When I saw the line for the first time, I thought: Wow! Is that even possible? And then it finally happened. Dreamtime was a very special time for me, a highlight in my climbing life.

In 2001, Austrian climber Bernd Zangerl made the first repeat and agreed with the V15 (8C) grading. In 2002, American climber Dave Graham made the third ascent but used a heel hook that he felt lowered the grade to V14 (8B+). The following year, American climber Chris Sharma made the fourth ascent, and using Graham's new beta agreed with Graham's grading. There was concern that holds were "overcleaned" (or even chipped) since Zangerl's ascent, which might have contributed to the lowering of the grade. In 2003, the situation was further complicated when Christian Core made the fifth ascent, said it was his hardest-ever boulder, and supported V15. Over the next five years, Dreamtime became one of the most desirable routes for leading climbers and repeats by Dai Koyamada, Nalle Hukkataival, Daniel Woods, Kilian Fischhuber and Adam Ondra (who was only 15 and solved it in 4 hours), led to a consensus grade of V14 (8B+).

In November 2009, Italian climber Michele Caminati discovered that the crux pinch hold had broken off, thus changing the route. In December 2009, Nalle Hukkataival repeated the damaged route and logged on the climbing database, 8a.nu, that the "standing start" version was now 8B (V13), and that Nicole's "sit start" version was "a real 8C now". Repeating the route a few days later, Ondra felt it was a "hard 8B+", but not 8C. With further repeats, consensus graded it closer to 8C, with Jan Hojer saying in 2013, "Much harder than any 8B+ [V14] I have ever tried".

In November 2024, American climber Michaela Kiersch made the first female free ascent of Dreamtime, which made her the first-ever female climber in history to have ascended both an 8C (V15) graded boulder and an 5.15a (9a+) graded sport climbing route, which she did on La Rambla in 2023.

=== The Story of Two Worlds ===
In June 2005, Dave Graham sent The Story of Two Worlds on the other side of the Dreamtime boulder, proposing a grade of 8C (V15). After the heated debates on Dreamtime, Graham wanted to develop a route that would be the "new standard for 8C". The 21-move route is a sit-start that links up with Toni Lamprecht's The Dagger, which is graded as V14 (8B+). In 2010, Dai Koyamada made the first repeat but confusion over the start position led Dai to return in 2012 and make another repeat but from a much lower position than Graham, creating The Story of Two Worlds Low Start, and at V16 (8C+).

With subsequent repeats by Paul Robinson, Jernej Kruder, and others, there was a consensus that the grade was at 8C (V15). The Story of Two Worlds became the first boulder to have a "consensus" grade of 8C (V15), although the actual first-ever at the grade is now regarded as Nicole's Monkey Wedding and Black Eagle SDS, both solved in 2002 on a trip to Rocklands, South Africa.

The Story of Two Worlds itself became subject to downgrade speculation, particularly with the development of kneepads that can be used for extended knee bar rests; Graham himself told Climbing in 2017 that the route "might be V14 now". Further repeats by some leading climbers such as Alex Megos have upheld the grade of 8C (V15), with Megos saying after his ascent of TSOTW in 2020, "I'd say 8C is about right".

== Variations ==
In February 2023, German climber Yannick Flohé created a direct finish that starts with Dreamtime, but at the crux, he goes right and directly up the boulder, following the line of Jimmy Webb's Somnolence V13 (8B). He named this variation Return of the Dreamtime and proposed a grade of V16 (8C+).

== Legacy ==
In a 2009 article on Dreamtime, PlanetMountain said: "So beautiful and important, the Dreamtime immediately did as its name suggests, it made everyone dream and, in doing so, it became a reference point for cutting-edge problems, one of the most famous boulders in the world, second perhaps only to Midnight Lightning, freed by Ron Kauk in 1978 at Camp Four in Yosemite". Others have also labeled Dreamtime as being the world's most famous boulder route, often along with Midnight Lightning, and credited it for promoting the development of the sport.

In 2015, Climbing listed Dreamtime and The Story of Two Worlds in their "Climb of the Century" for the bouldering category, saying: "In 2000, Fred Nicole gave the world its first 8C (V15) boulder with Dreamtime—arguably the first internationally famous boulder problem since Midnight Lightning. The Story of Two Worlds (Dave Graham, 2005), on the same boulder, became the new standard for V15 after Dreamtime was broken and downgraded."

In a later 2017 piece, PlanetMountain said: "But the one that more than any other captured the imagination of climbers at the beginning of the new millennium was most certainly Dreamtime". Repeating Dreamtime is considered a rite-of-passage for major boulder climbers. In 2017, Outside listed the ascent of Dreamtime in its "12 Great Moments in Bouldering History". In 2020, when German climber Alex Megos repeated Dreamtime, he wrote on his Instagram page: "This one has definitely been on the bucket list! DREAMTIME. Possibly the most famous boulder problem in the world!".

== Ascents ==
Dreamtime has been ascended by (and their proposed grade):

=== Pre-hold break ===
- 1st Fred Nicole on 28 October 2000; 8C (V15)
- 2nd Bernd Zangerl in April 2001; 8C (V15)
- 3rd Dave Graham in January 2002; 8B+ (V14)
- 4th Chris Sharma in August 2002; 8B+ (V14)
- 5th Christian Core in February 2003; 8C (V15)
- 6th Thomas Willenberg in April 2003; 8C (V15)
- 7th Malcolm Smith in February 2004; 8B+ (V14)
- 8th James Litz in March 2004; 8C (V15)
- 9th Christoph Cepus in April 2004; 8C (V15)
- 10th Lionel Lamberlin in May 2004; 8B+ (V14)
- 11th Dai Koyamada in November 2004; 8B+ (V14)
- 12th Nalle Hukkataival in March 2005; 8B+ (V14)
- 13th Martin Cermak in March 2006; 8B+ (V14)
- 14th Tayler Landman in November 2006; 8B+ (V14)
- 15th Daniel Woods in November 2007; 8B+ (V14)
- 16th Jon Cardwell in December 2007; 8B+ (V14)
- 17th Kilian Fischhuber in December 2007; 8B+ (V14)
- 18th Adam Ondra (age 15, in 4 hours) in March 2008; 8B+ (V14)

=== Post-hold break ===
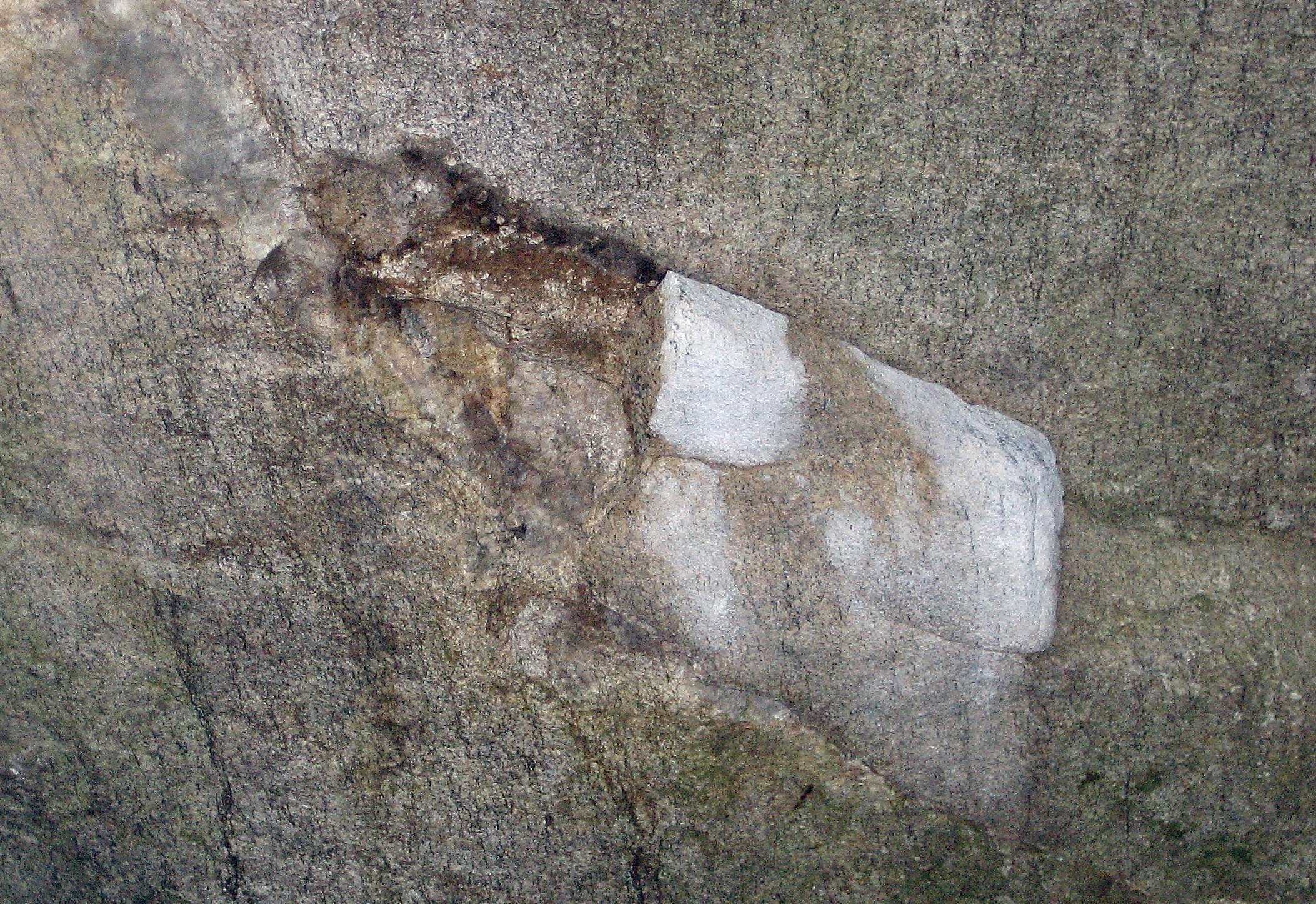
Broken hold of Dreamtime

The first ascents post the break of the hold include:

- 1st Nalle Hukkataival in December 2009; 8C (V15)
- 2nd Adam Ondra in December 2009; hard 8B+ (V14)
- 3rd Tatsuya Muraoka in March 2010; 8C (V15)
- 4th Paul Robinson in November 2010; 8B+ (V14)

The first female free ascents include (FFFA):

- 1st Michaela Kiersch in November 2024, first female free ascent of Dreamtime, 8C (V15)

Other notable post-break ascents include:

- Jan Hojer in February 2013; 8C (V15)
- Fabian Buhl in March 2013; 8C (V15)
- Giuliano Cameroni in January 2015; 8C (V15)
- Jimmy Webb in February 2018; 8C (V15)
- Jakob Schubert in February 2018; 8B+ (V14)
- Simon Lorenzi in January 2019
- Jernej Kruder in November 2019
- Alex Megos in December 2020; 8C (V15)
- Yannick Flohé in December 2020; 8C (V15)
- William Bosi in December 2022; soft 8C (V15)

== See also ==
- History of rock climbing
- List of grade milestones in rock climbing
- The Mandala, famous V12 (8A+) boulder at The Buttermilks
- Midnight Lightning, famous V8 (7B/7B+) boulder in Camp 4 (Yosemite)
- The Wheel of Life, famous V15 (8C) boulder in the Grampians, Australia
