= Fred Rouhling =

French rock climber

Personal information
- Nationality: French
- Born: January 24, 1970 (age 56) Le Panissaud, Charente.
- Height: 5 ft 9 in (175 cm)
- Spouse: Céline Rouhling

Climbing career
- Type of climber: Sport climbing; Bouldering
- Highest grade: Redpoint: 9a+ (5.15a); Bouldering: V15 (8C)
- First ascents: UFO (8c, 1993); Hugh (9a, 1993); Spécialistes Direct (8c, 1994); Akira (9a, 1995); L'autre côté du Ciel (9a, 1996); Mandallaz Drive (9a, 2004); Salamandre (9a+, 2007)
- Known for: First 9a in France (4th in the world) (Note: Hugh would become the fourth 9a in the world, the first was Wolfgang Gullich's Action Directe (1991), the second was Alexander Huber's Om (1992), and the third was Fred Nicole's Bain de Sang (1993).); Akira 9b grading controversy (1995)
- Updated on 22 June 2022

Fred Rouhling (born 24 January 1970) is a French rock climber and boulderer, noted for creating and repeating some of the earliest grade 9a (5.14d) sport climbing routes in the world, including Hugh in 1993, the first-ever French 9a (5.14d) sport route. Rouhling is also known for the controversy from his proposed grading of 9b (5.15b) for his 1995 route Akira, which would have made it the world's first-ever 9b-graded sport route; 25 years later, it was graded at 9a (5.14d).

== Early life ==
Rouhling grew up in the small French farming town of Le Panissaud. His neighboring village of Vilhonneur has a limestone quarry (which supplied materials for the Statue of Liberty). Twenty minutes away is the larger town of Angoulême, where limestone crags overhang many of the roads, with the best-known being Les Eaux Claires ("The Clear Waters"), with 15 to 20-metre overhanging extreme routes that require strong fingers to manage the small pockets used to ascend them; and contains nationally-regarded extreme routes such as La Crépinette (1983), France's first 8a (5.13b). Rouhling began to climb in school, and by age 19 was climbing at 8b (5.13d) when the world's hardest routes were then at 8c (5.14b).

== Climbing career ==
=== Hugh, first 9a in France ===
In the early 1990s, Rouhling had moved to the south of France for college where he also had access to the leading sport climbing venues of France. Rouhling made the first ascent of UFO, the first 8c (5.14b) in the Calanques, and then completed Les Spécialistes Direct at the Verdon Gorge. Les Spécialistes Direct was a variation on Jean-Baptiste Tribout's famous 1987 route, Les Spécialistes, which was bolted earlier by Alain Robert; with the downgrade of Les Spécialistes to 8b+, Rouhling's ascent remains the first 8c route in the gorge.

Returning home in 1993, Rouhling wanted to create different routes from the long steep stamina crimpy routes of the Calanques and Verdon. At his local crag of Eaux-Clairs, he freed a line he called Hugh with a double-overhanging bulge that required little footwork. Having climbed it, he made the route harder by filling in holds and chipping-out new ones that he graded at 9a (5.14d). At the time, there were only three known 9a routes in the world. Hugh was repeated in 2001, and by Dai Koyamada (2002), and Sébastien Bouin (2020), confirming the grade of 9a, the first 9a in France.

The use of chipping to create new extreme routes was not uncommon then in France, and included examples such as Antoine Le Menestrel's famous Buoux route, La Rose et la Vampire 8b (5.13d). Some major North American routes also relied on chipped holds for their development, with examples such as The Phoenix 5.13a (7c+) in Yosemite, and Just do It 5.14c (8c+) at Smith Rocks. In a 2021 documentary, Rouhling said that finding natural new hard routes is difficult (particularly of the overhanging roof style that he was attracted to) and that the chipping of new "hardest" routes was far more widespread than was understood; Rouhling also noted that other leading French climbers had manufactured such routes in their own local quarries for their development and training.

=== Akira controversy ===
Home again in 1995 as his wife was recovering from back surgery, Rouhling began work on a new route he called Akira in the Vilhonneur quarry. Akira was a 65-foot long low horizontal roof (only circa 12 feet off the ground), that he estimated had an 8B (V13) bouldering problem, with a final 20-foot 5.13b (8a) vertical section beyond the lip (the only part for which he used a rope); such a route was unprecedented as a sport climb at the time. (Note: Long horizontal roofs were becoming more common as extreme bouldering problems, which Rouhling had the experience of doing at locations like Fontainebleau.) On completing Akira, belayed by his recovered wife, Rouhling graded it at 9b (5.15b). At the time, nobody had climbed 9a+ (Chris Sharma would climb the world's first consensus 9a+ in 2001, and the first consensus 9b in 2008). In 1997, Rouhling added another chipped route at Eaux Claire, L'autre côté du Ciel, a spectacular high roof, that he graded at 9a (5.14d).

Rouhling faced an unprecedented level of personalized attack for Akira. Leading climbers publicly challenged his integrity, and various unsubstantiated theories were promoted about Rouhling and his routes. Those that tried Akira, failed to climb it. (Note: French climber Jean-Baptiste Tribout visited Akira but failed to climb it, and accused Rouhling of lying about ever completing the route in his book. Spanish climber Dani Andrada also visited Akira and failed to climb it (although he felt it was circa 9a), and Alexander Huber said that Andrada had told him Rouhling had subsequently changed the route to make it harder. Japanese climbers Yuji Hirayama and Dai Koyamada, on a 2000 tour of Rouhling's local crags, also failed to climb Akira, and felt it was much harder than Hugh, which Koyamada climbed in 2002.) In 2004, Climbing sent Pete Ward (a future American Alpine Club Board member), to interview Rouhling over several days, and see him on his routes. Ward could not opine on the grade but verified that Rouhling was able to climb his routes as they were. (Note: Rouhling had a website called "fredrouhling.com" (now defunct) that contained video footage of him on his main routes including Hugh, L'autre côté du Ciel, and Akira, however, they can be found on youtube. Tim Kemple, accompanied Pete Ward and took photos and footage of Rouhling climbing his routes for Climbing.) Ward also believed that Rouhling should have classed Akira as a boulder problem rather than as a sport route. Ward was able to debunk several of the criticisms about Rouhling and Akira, and expressed a positive view of Rouhling from the interview process.

In 2020, Seb Bouin climbed three of Rouhling's routes in his local crags and found two of their grades accurate at 9a (Hugh and L'autre côté du Ciel), however, he felt Akira was also a "hard 9a", and that the roof was at V9 (7C). Bouin said: "Anyway this route is hard", "and quite unbelievable for the 90's". Rouhling was disappointed at the downgrade and felt that the requirement to hang from a pinch hold in the roof at the first crux, while familiar in contemporary extreme routes, was novel in 1995, and was why no climber of his generation could send the route. In 2021, the climbing database 8a.nu agreed that changes in equipment and techniques for roof climbing could explain much of the downgrade. In 2022, climbing author Sam Anderson attributed some of the vilification of Rouhling to the fact that at the time, he was not considered "the world's best climber", and thus would not be accepted as the person who climbed "the world's hardest route".

=== Return to climbing ===
After Akira, Rouhling's wife Celine needed brain surgery for a life-threatening illness, and Rouhling largely abandoned extreme climbing for a number of years to focus on his family and young children. In 2001, on his wife's recovery, Rouhling repeated Fred Nicole's Bain de Sang, which was the second-ever repeat – after Fred's brother François – of a 9a-graded route in history. In 2002 and 2003, Rouhling visited Switzerland's leading bouldering areas, repeating several of Fred Nicole's most notable problems, including several up to V14 (8B+) (e.g. Eau Profonde), and one at V15 (8C), with E la nave va.

In 2004, Rouhling established his fourth route above 9a with Mandallaz Drive at 9a (5.14d), and in 2007 he added a fifth with Salamandre at 9a+ (5.15a). Rouhling did not use any chipping to create these new routes, they were natural. In 2007 Rouhling went on bouldering trips with French climber Romain Desgranges to Rocklands, South Africa, and to Joshua Tree, California. In 2010, the pair went on a bouldering trip to New Zealand where Rouhling repeated Chris Sharma's 2005 problem Achilles last stand 8A+ (V12), which was Rouhling's 100th boulder ascent above 8A (V11).

In 2009, one of the main online databases for extreme rock climbers, 8a.nu, asked the question "Is Fred Rouhling the best ever FA [first ascent] climber in the world?", noting that Rouhling's combination of first ascents for the hardest sport climbs and hard bouldering routes ranked him #3 in their All-Time High Combined rankings.

In a 2021 interview, Rouhling said that he then only climbed a few times a year and that, while as a climber, he was very disappointed with the reception to his 9a routes. As an artist (he sculpts in his spare time), he was very proud of his creations, and the emotions and engagement that they still aroused in the climbing community.

== Personal life ==
Fred is together with Lili and has two children, Hugo and Chloe.

Rouhling sculpts in his spare time.

== Notable ascents ==
=== Redpointed routes ===
9a+ (5.15a):

- Salamandre – Double Cache crag, Saint-Pierre-en-Faucigny (FRA) – 2007. First ascent (natural route, no chipping). First repeat by Baptiste Dherbilly in 2017.

9a (5.14d):

- Mandallaz Drive – Allonzier-la-Caille, (FRA) – 2004. First ascent (natural route, no chipping). First repeat by Baptiste Dherbilly in 2021.

- Bain de Sang – Saint Loup, (CHF) – 2001. Third ascent of Fred Nicole's 1993 route; at the time of Rouhling's ascent, there were only four known 9a routes in the world.

- L'autre côté du Ciel – Les Eaux-Claires (Charente), (FRA) – 1997. First ascent. Rouhling almost entirely manufactured the route by chipping out the holds (a practice at the time but since shunned). First repeat by Seb Bouin in 2020 who agreed it was 9a, but felt that a kneepad (which he did not use) could make it easier.

- Akira – Vilhonneur (Charente), (FRA) – 1995. First ascent. Rouhling used some chipping and hold filling to create the route. He estimated it at 9b, the world's first-ever 9b (and even 9a+) at the time, and created one of the most famous grading disputes in sport climbing history. First repeat by Seb Bouin and Lucien Martinez in 2020 who assigned the route a "hard 9a" grade.

- Hugh – Les Eaux-Claires (Charente), (FRA) – 1993. First ascent. First-ever French 9a-graded sport route and fourth 9a in the world. Rouhling chipped out some new holds and filled in others to create the route. First repeat by Alessandro Lamberti (2001), with many others including Dai Koyamada in 2002, and Seb Bouin in 2020 who also confirmed the grade of 9a.

8c+ (5.14c):

- Empreinte – Double Cache crag, Saint-Pierre-en-Faucigny (FRA) – 2008. First ascent (natural route, no chipping). Rouhling proposed 9a+; first repeat by Baptiste Dherbilly in 2021 said 8c+.
- Non à la Bombe – Saint Loup, (CHF) – 2001. Repeat of Fred Nicole's 1995 route.
- Archipel – Les Eaux-Claires (Charente), (FRA) – 1997. First ascent. First repeat by Dai Koyamada and Yuji Hirayama in 2000 (and first repeat of any Rouhling route above 8c+) who confirmed grade.
- Kami – Les Eaux-Claires (Charente), (FRA) – 1994. First ascent. First repeat by Pierre Bollinger in 2001.

8c (5.14b):

- La voie du Charpentier – Allonzier-la-Caille (FRA) – 2005. First ascent.
- Les Spécialistes Direct – Verdon Gorge (FRA) – 1994. First ascent, and first 8c in the Verdun Gorge. Variation of Jean-Baptiste Tribout's famous 1987 8b+ route, bolted by Alain Robert.
- UFO – Massif des Calanques (FRA) – 1993. First ascent.

=== Boulder problems ===
V15 (8C):

- E la nave va (Traverse) – Lindental, (SUI) – 2003. First repeat of Fred Nicole's 1994 boulder traverse problem.

V14 (8B+):

- Soumission – Le Bourrinoire, Haute-Savoie, (FRA) – 2006. First ascent. Route was subsequently destroyed, along with Romain Desgranges's classic, Kaiser Sauzé 8C+.
- Eau Profonde – Kesslerloch, Schaffhausen, (SUI) – 2003(e). First repeat of Fred Nicole's 1997 boulder problem.
- Broadsword (Traverse) – Lindental, (SUI) – 2003. Repeat of Fred Nicole's 1995 boulder traverse problem.
- Va piu via (Traverse) – Lindental, (SUI) – 2003. Repeat.
- Joyeux Leon (Traverse) – La Balmaz, (SUI) – 2003. Repeat of Fred Nicole's 1992 boulder traverse problem.
- Le voyage du Crabe (Traverse) – Saint-George, (SUI) – 2003. Repeat.
- Prophécie – Saint-George, (SUI) – 2003. Repeat.

== See also ==
- Romain Desgranges, climbing partner of Rouhling
- Jumbo Love, would become the first climb in the world with a consensus grade of 9b (5.15b)
