= Climbing route =

Path to scale a mountain, rock, or ice wall

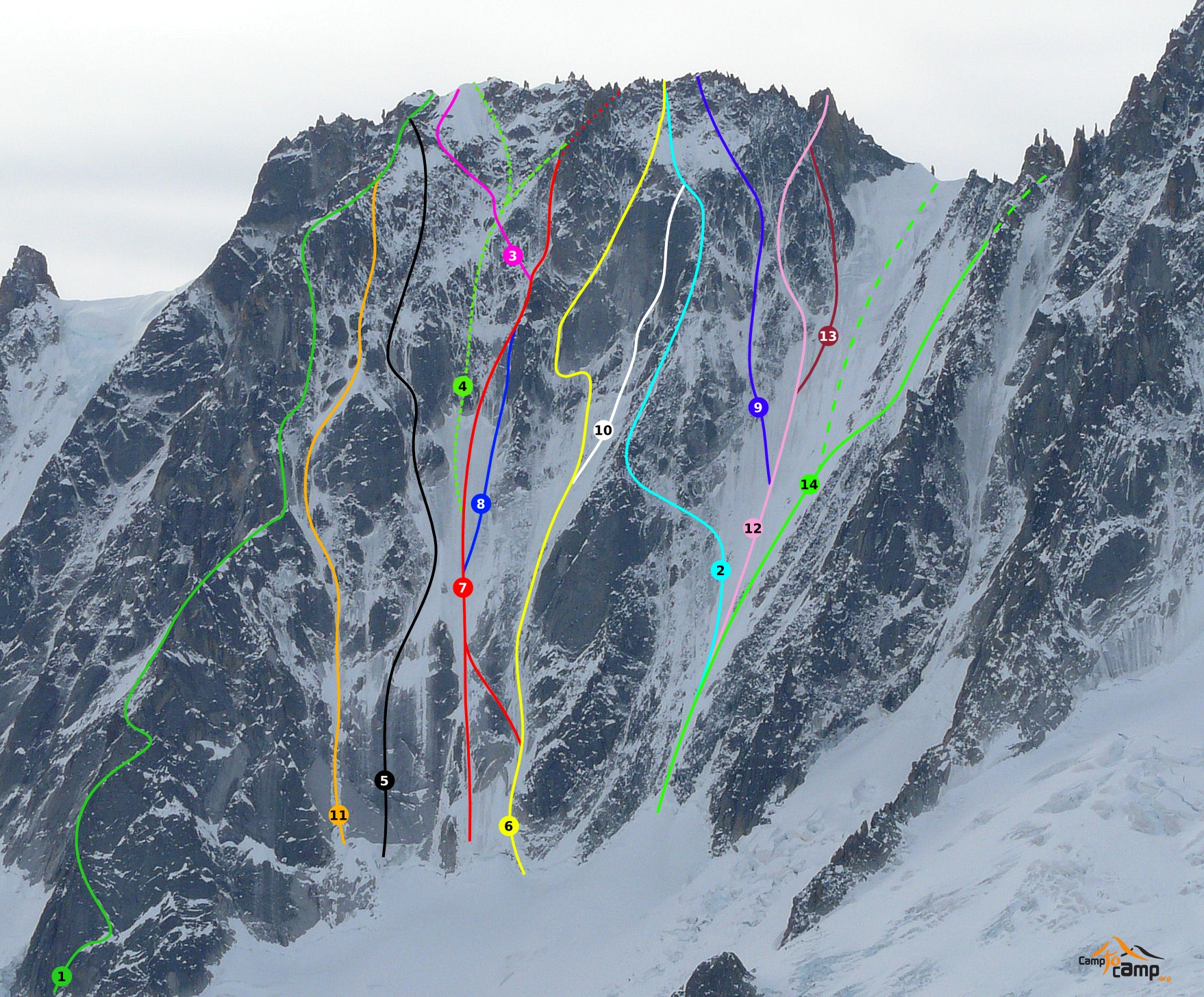
Various alpine climbing routes highlighted in colour on the north face of Les Droites in the Alps

A climbing route is a path by which a climber reaches the top of a geological structure. Climbing routes are recorded in a climbing guidebooks and/or in online climbing-route databases. Details recorded include the type of route (e.g. bouldering route, sport climbing route, traditional climbing route, ice climbing route, or alpine climbing route, etc.), the difficulty grade of the route–and the beta for its crux–including any risk or commitment-grade, the length and number of pitches of the route, and the climbing equipment (e.g. climbing protection gear) that is needed to complete the route.

Definitions have been agreed on what determines a valid ascent of a route (e.g. the redpoint in rock climbing), and on the classes or styles of ascent (e.g. onsighted, flashed). The coveted first ascent (FA), first free ascent (FFA), and first female free ascent (FFFA), are chronicled for most routes. After a route is established, variations can be created (e.g. directessimas, sit starts, or enchainments), and climbers will try to improve on the style in which the route is climbed (e.g. minimizing aid climbing or removing other supports such as oxygen or fixed ropes). Some climbers will try to reduce or limit the in-situ climbing protection (e.g. greenpointing) or will try to completely free-solo the route. Others seek to set speed climbing records on routes.

The ascent of ever-harder routes is an integral key part of the history of climbing, and each type of climbing has notable routes that set major new milestones of difficulty. There are ongoing debates amongst climbers about routes including the naming of routes, the creation of new routes by artificially altering the surface (e.g. chipping in rock climbing), the role of completely artificial indoor routes (e.g. The Project), the level and maintenance of in-situ climbing protection on routes (e.g. providing permanent bolted protection anchors) and the ethical issue of retro-bolting (e.g. turning traditional climbing routes into safer sport climbing bolted routes).

== Details recorded ==
"Topo" of a multi-pitch alpine climbing route on the SW Pillar of the Aiguille des Deux Aigles (500-metres, grade TD)

Climbing routes are usually chronicled in a climbing guidebook, a climbing journal (e.g. the American Alpine Journal or the Himalayan Journal), and/or in an online route database (e.g. theCrag.com or MountainProject.com), where the key details of the route are listed, such as:

=== Physical details ===
- Climbing area (or crag). Routes are often clustered together in a general "climbing area", which is also known as a "crag". Notable climbing areas include: El Capitan (for big wall climbing in the US), Clogwyn Du'r Arddu (for traditional climbing in the UK), Buoux, Verdon Gorge and Ceuse (for sport climbing in France).
- Route name. While rock and modern ice climbing routes can have any name, offensive names are removed from databases and guidebooks. In countries such as France the person who created the route names it, whereas in others such as the US and UK, the first person to ascend the route names it (e.g. the Realization/Biographie controversy). Alpine routes tend to have names based on the peak or the first ascender and the geological feature, such as the Bonatti Pillar or the Walker Spur.
- Type and condition of the surface. Different types of rock, such as limestone, granite, or sandstone, present different challenges in terms of friction and types of holds. The typical condition of the rock (e.g. solid or crumbling, or dry and damp) might be noted. Ice climbers will differentiate between the type of ice (e.g. water ice, permanent alpine ice), and the stability of the ice surface (e.g. sheet ice, thick ice).
- Graphical topo of the route. Most guidebooks will include a photograph or drawing showing the line of the route. For more complicated routes (and for longer multi-pitch routes), a more detailed "topo" (short for topographic) illustration will include symbols for key obstacles (e.g. roofs, overhangs, aretes) and key features (e.g. corners, cracks) encountered on the route; and information on the crux(es).
- Length and number of pitches. A key detail is the length of the route, which can vary from a few metres for a bouldering route, to several thousand metres for a big wall climbing or alpine climbing route. Longer routes are broken up into "pitches", which are less than a rope length; climbers will lead each pitch one at a time. For example, The Nose is over 880-metres long, and breaks up into 31-pitches.

=== Climbing details ===
- Type of climb and equipment needed. A key detail is whether climbing protection is already in-situ (i.e. sport climbing), or must be inserted while climbing (i.e. traditional climbing). The protection equipment needed on traditional climbing routes will vary depending on the type of challenge presented (e.g. crack climbing, slab climbing, etc.). Some routes may require aid climbing and/or abseiling equipment.
- Grade of difficulty and risk. Routes are graded for their difficulty – particularly for the crux(es) – and the availability of adequate protection. Each route type will use the appropriate grading system such as: boulder grades, sport grades, traditional grades, aid grades, or ice grades. Big wall grade and alpine grade systems have additional grades for the level of commitment and seriousness of the route.
- Estimated timings (for longer routes). Multi-pitch climbs (e.g. big wall and alpine climbs) will include details of the estimated timetable for the route, which might go from hours to several days and weeks. These timings may include additional information on key milestones that need to be reached in a given time to achieve the overall route timetable and to complete the route safely with sufficient provisions.
- History of first ascent (FA), first free ascent (FFA), and first female free ascent (FFFA). Guidebooks record the first person(s) to do the FA, FFA, and FFFA, including the "style" of the ascent and whether it was practiced beforehand by top roping. The type of aid used for the FA might be recorded, as well as near-FFAs that used minor aid. On alpine routes, the first winter ascent is recorded.
- Popularity and other feedback. Modern guidebooks will include a popularity rating for individual routes in the climbing area (e.g. awarding 3-stars to the most popular/best-regarded routes, which are often called "classics"). They may also include additional climber feedback (or beta) on the route such as whether it requires muscle power, balance/footwork, or strong fingers to be successful.

== Route terminology ==
=== In rock climbing ===
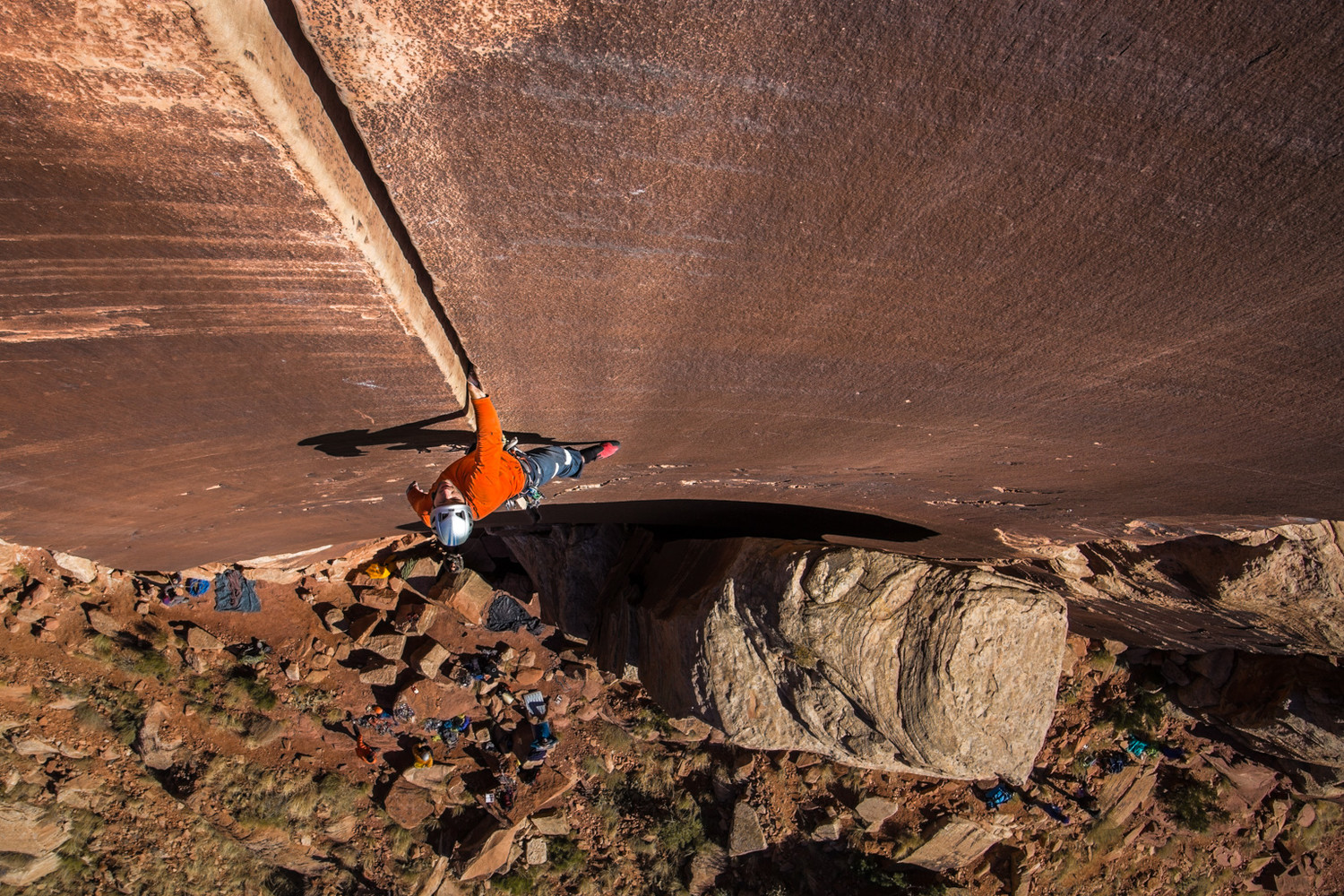
Crack climbing

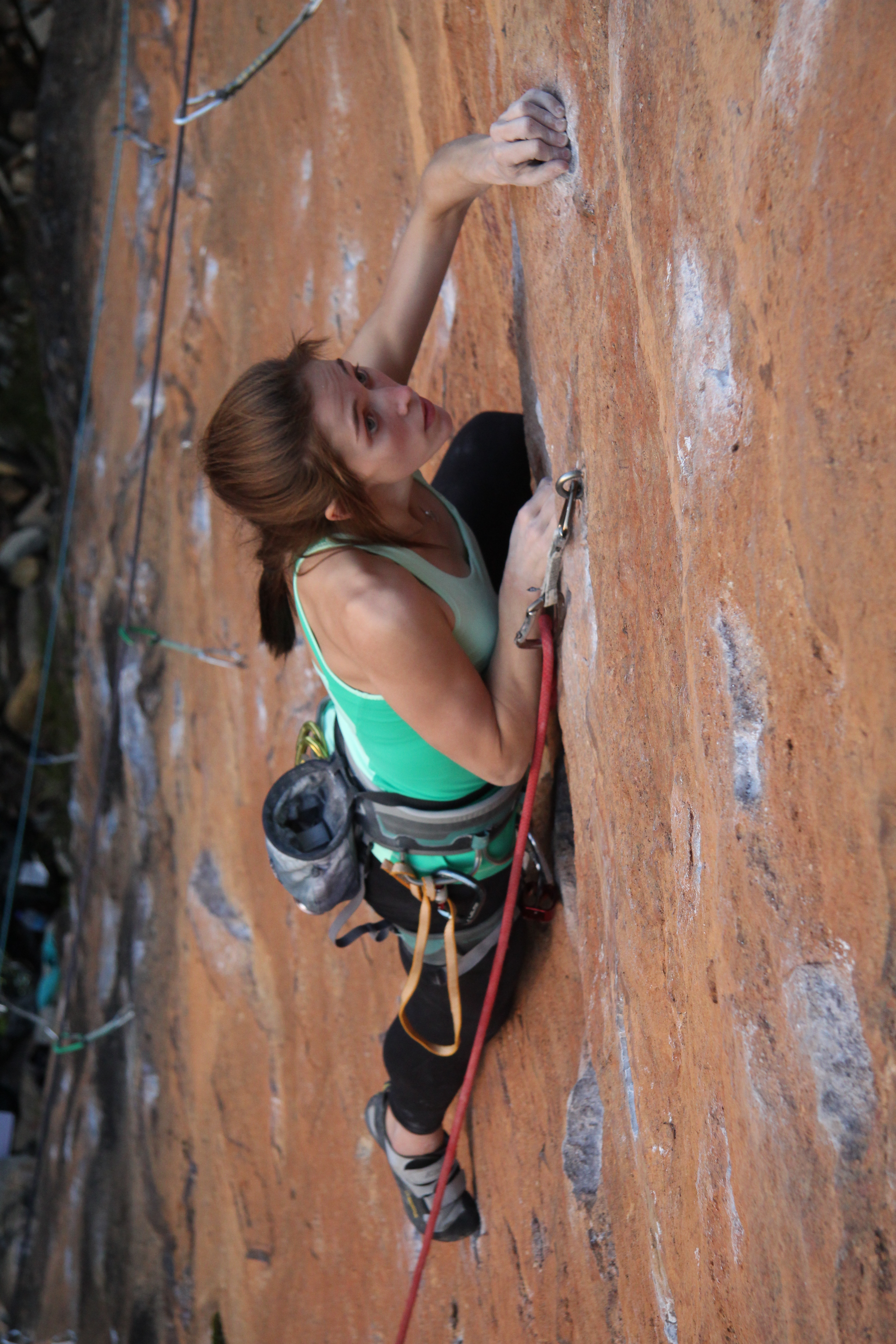
Face climbing

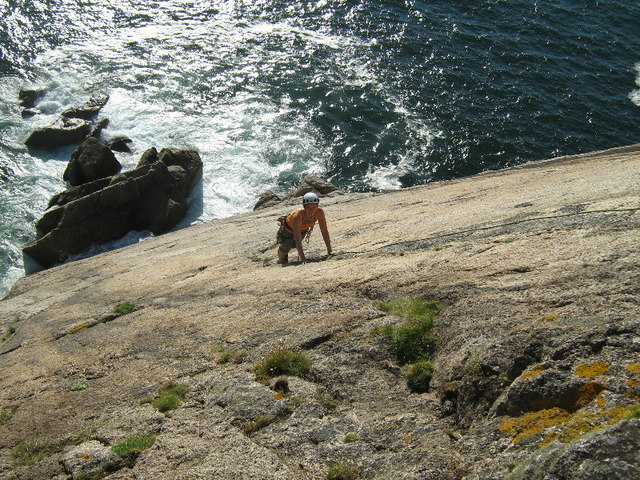
Slab climbing

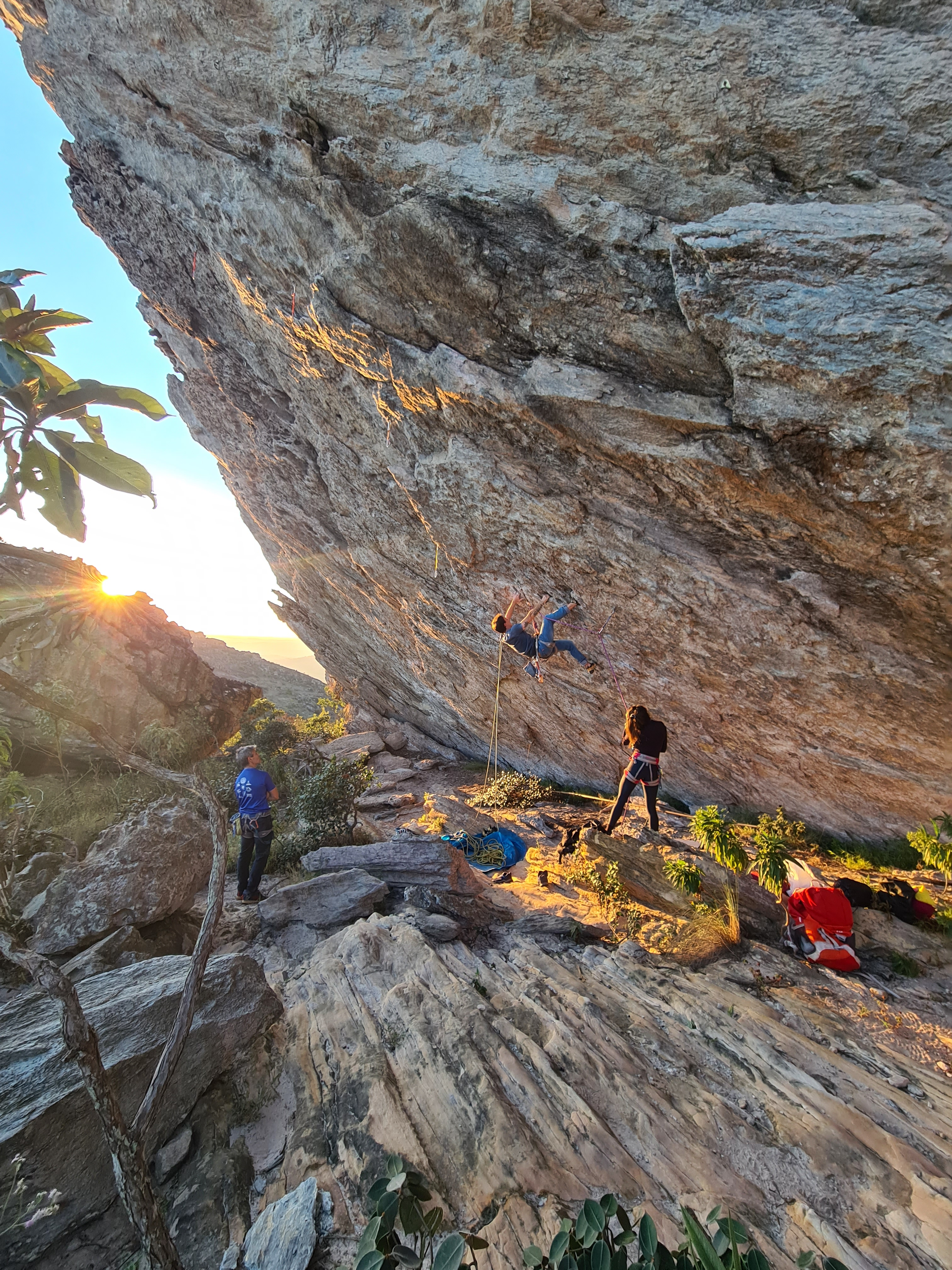
Overhang climbing

Climbers will often differentiate climbing routes by the general types of challenges they present. For example, in rock-climbing the four main types of challenges are:

- Crack climbing, are routes following a system of crack(s) that the climber uses to ascend the route; the width of the crack dictates the techniques needed, and crack-climbs are further differentiated by the body parts that can be 'jammed' into them.
- Face climbing, where the rock face is fully vertical, unlike in slab climbing, and is largely featureless, unlike in crack climbing; face-climbing routes are typically sustained and exposed, and longer multi-pitch routes can become big wall climbing.
- Slab climbing, where the rock face is 'off-angle' and not fully vertical; while the softer angle enables climbers to place more of their body weight on their feet, slab climbs maintain the challenge by having smaller holds.
- Overhang (or roof) climbing, where the rock face leans back at an angle of over 90 degrees for part or all of the climb, and at its most severe can be a horizontal roof; most of the hardest modern climbs are continuously overhanging.

=== In mountaineering and alpine climbing ===
Types of mountaineering / alpine climbing routes

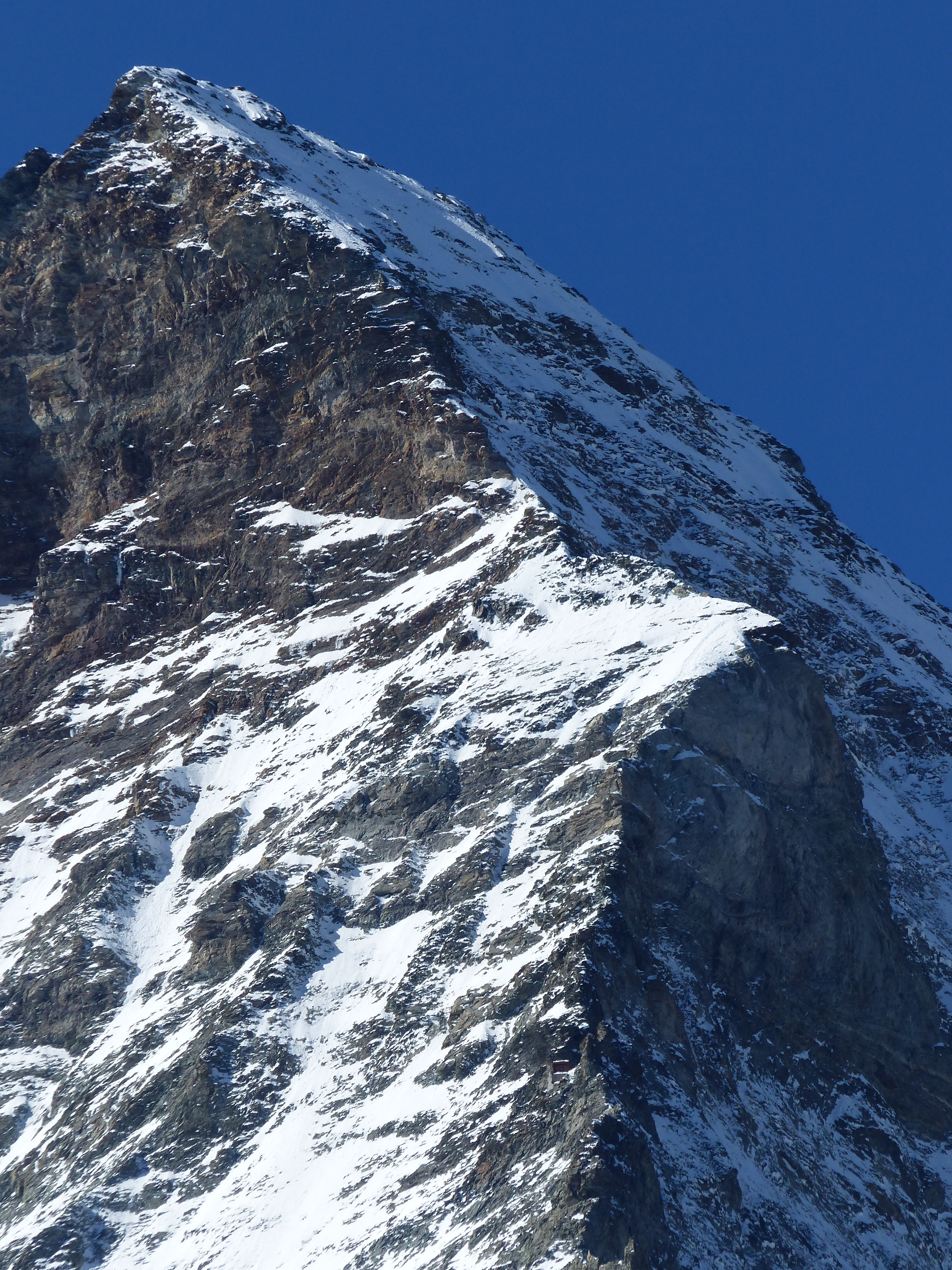
Matterhorn Hörnli Ridge (1,220 m, AD III) of the Matterhorn

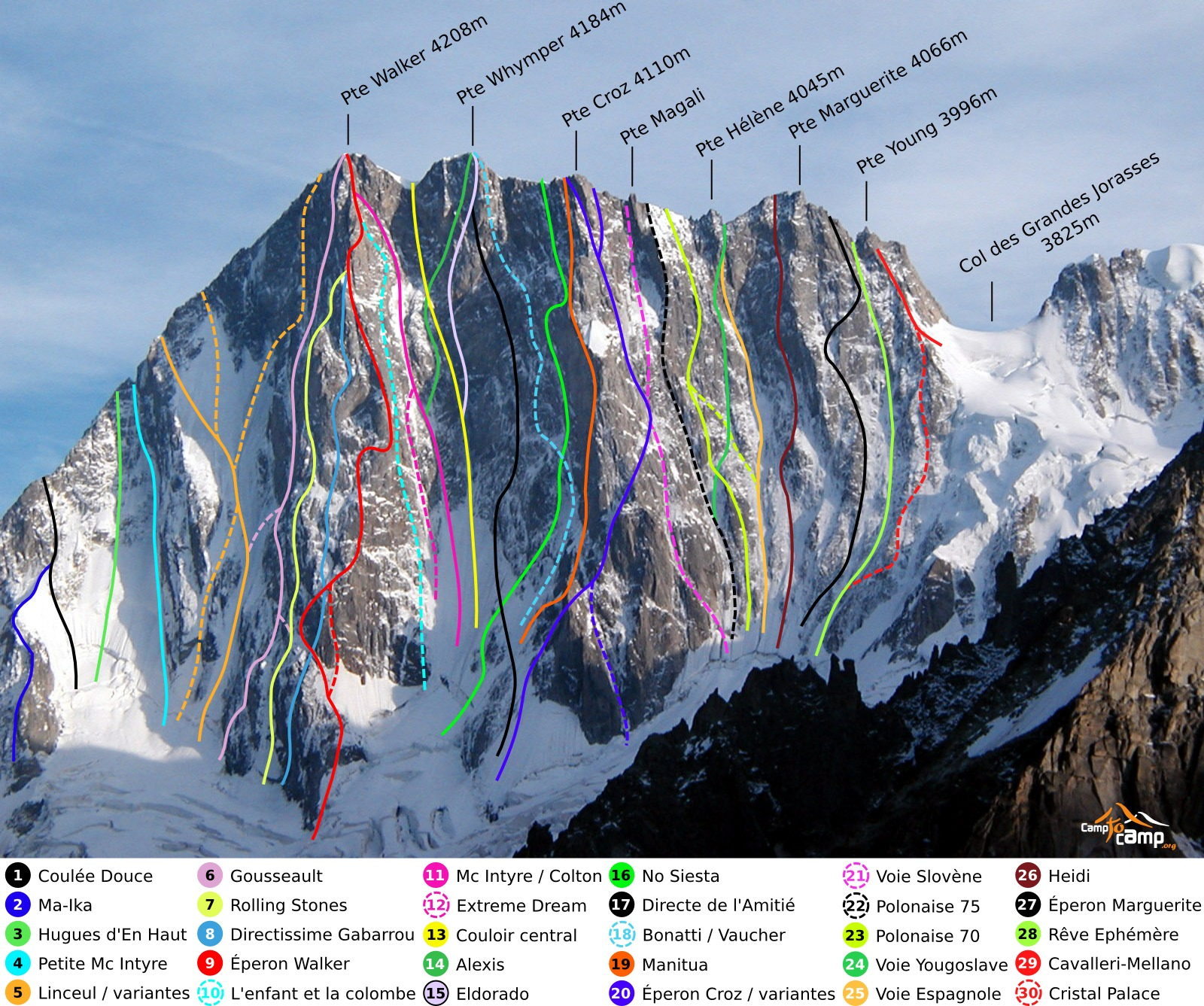
Grandes Jorasses North Face: Routes include couloirs, rock-pillars / buttresses, and open faces.

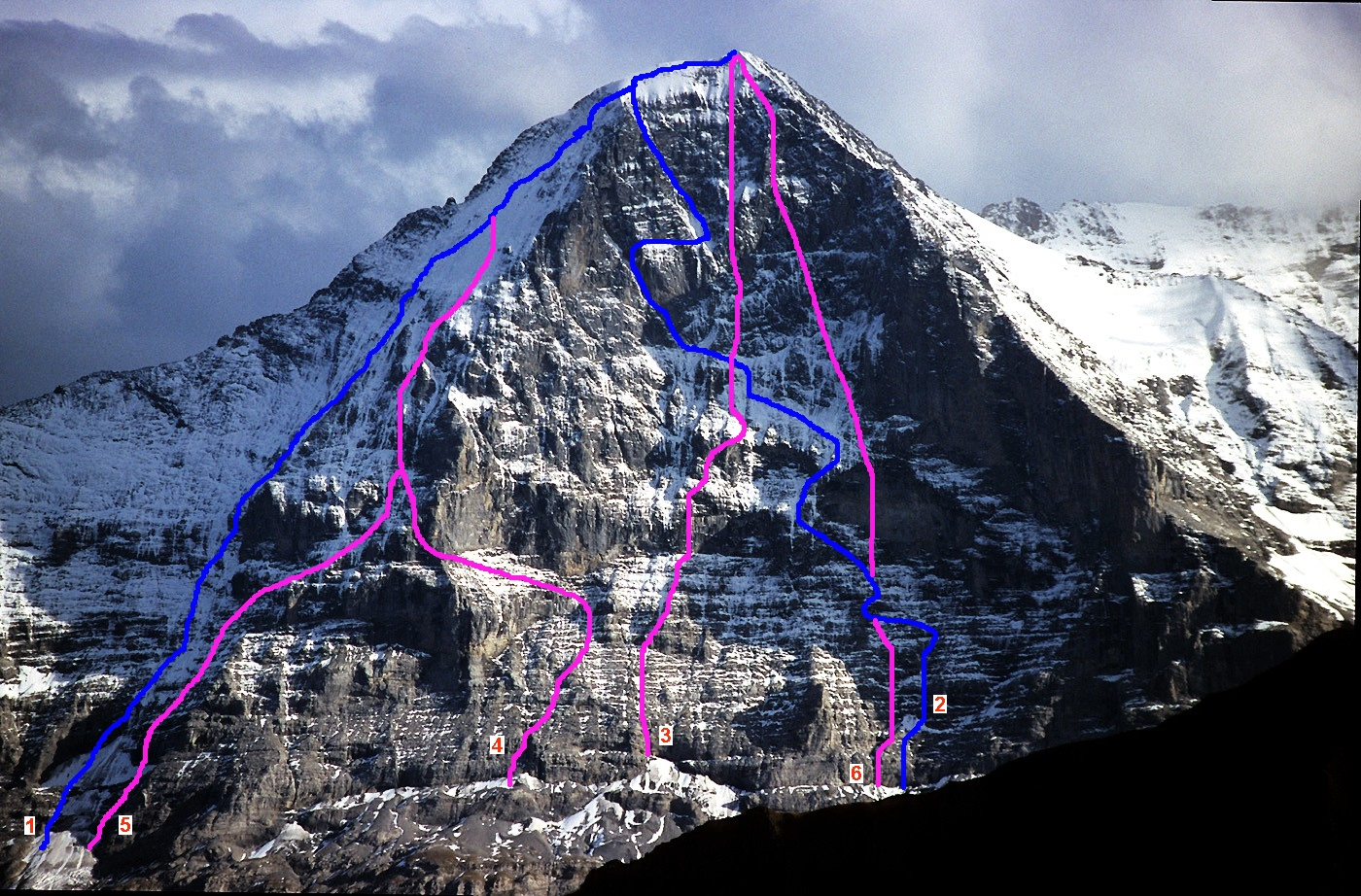
Eiger North Face: The original 1938 Heckmair Route (blue-line #2) contrasts with the 1966 Harlin Direttissima

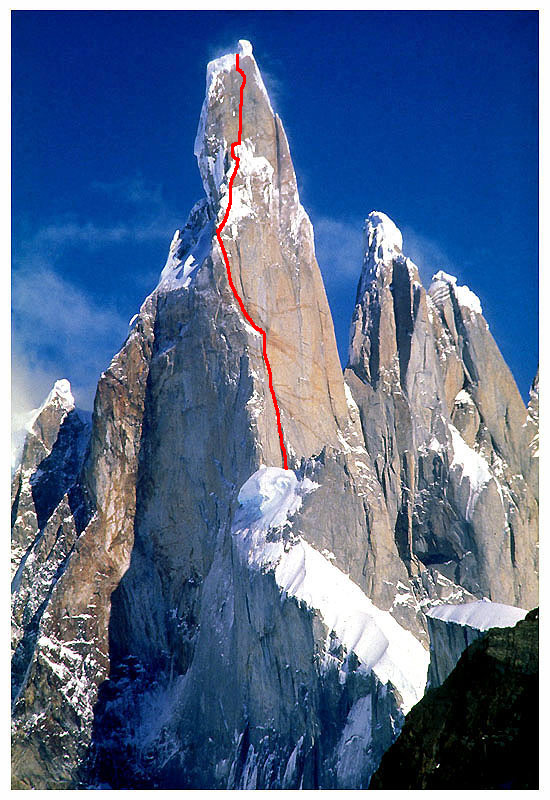
Cerro Torre Compressor Route SE Ridge

Mountaineering can take place on a broad range of routes, not all of which reach the peak of the mountain in question. They will be typically long multi-pitch routes with a mixture of rock, ice and/or snow surfaces. The most straightforward route to the peak is often the easiest and thus the busiest, is typically called the voie normale. These routes generally follow a ridge that rises at a less steeper angle then other options to the top (e.g., the Hörnli Ridge on the Matterhorn), or an easier angled slope that rises to a col that can then follow a summit-ridge to the top (e.g., the south-col route on Mount Everest).

After the first ascent, climbers will look to ascend via the main ridges and the main faces of the mountain. While face-routes are typically more severe due to their greater steepness, there are many notable ridge-routes that are equally serious undertakings due to their length and complexity (e.g., Everest's North East Ridge, Nanga Parbat's Mazeno Ridge or the Compressor Route on Cerro Torre's South East Ridge ). Climbers will also look to climb prominent features on the faces such as couloirs (e.g., the SuperCouloir), and ribs, spurs or pillars of rock (e.g., the Bonatti Pillar or the Walker Spur).

North-face routes are often the most challenging as their northerly aspect means that that they are more ice-covered and avalanche prone all year round, and they are hit by more serious weather systems than the other faces (e.g, the famous 1938 Heckmair Route on the Eiger). The Great north faces of the Alps are considered major testpiece routes for aspiring alpine climbers. All major climbing peaks will have many routes on all of their main faces, some following different crack systems or physical features, and others being harder technical refinements and variations of earlier routes.

=== For variations of routes ===
When a rock climbing or mountaineering route has been established, variations may be subsequently added, a typical one being a more "direct" line (e.g. a direct start or direct finish) of the original route, also called a direttissima in alpine climbing, and thus not avoiding the difficult obstacles that the original route went around (e.g. a roof or an overhang, or a section with minimal holds). Boulder climbers might add a harder sit start "SS" (or sit-down-start, "SDS") variation to a boulder route (e.g. the SDS of Dreamtime is graded well above the standing start version). Alpine and big wall climbers often seek to link established routes together in a larger enchainment (or "link-up") route (e.g. the notable Moonwalk Traverse of the entire Cerro Chaltén Group in Patagonia).

=== For types of ascents ===
The definition of what is classed as a valid ascent of a climbing route is a redpoint. Many routes may not be climbed on the first attempt, and will require days (and in some cases, years) of attempts; when a climber undertakes such a task, it is sometimes called projecting a route (i.e. the route becomes a "project"). When a climber does climb the route on their first attempt without any falls and without any prior knowledge of how to climb the route (which is called beta), it is known as an onsight; where the climber had prior beta on the route, it is known as a flash. Alpine climbers distinguish whether the ascent was made in summer or in the more difficult winter season (e.g. it was not until 2021 that K2 was climbed in winter).

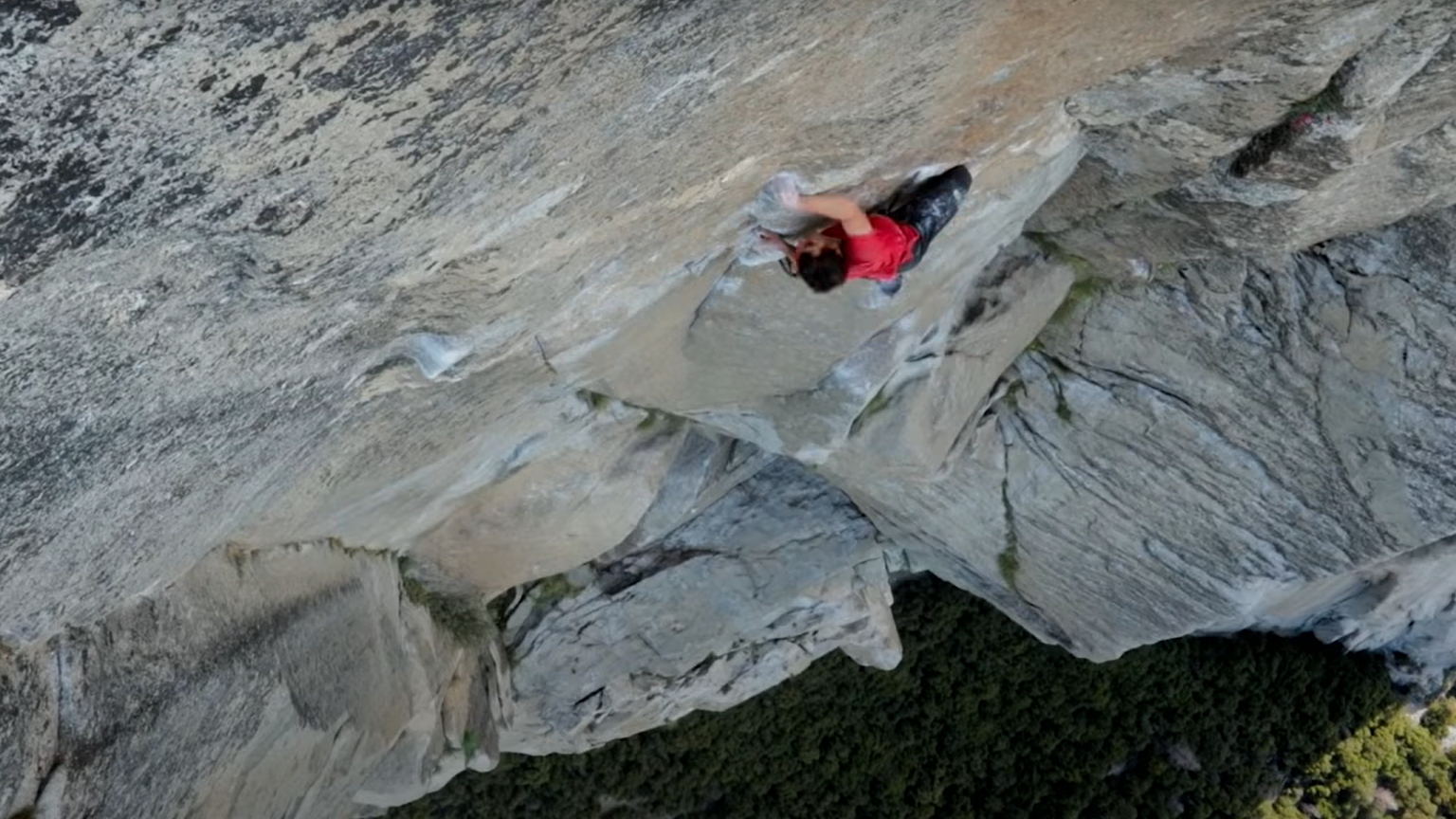
Alex Honnold's 2017 free solo of Freerider (5.13a, 7c+), El Capitan

Climbers will also seek to improve the "style" in which a route is climbed. A route that uses a lot of aid climbing will be reclimbed with less and less aid until it is eventually "free climbed" (i.e. using no aid, either as a sport or a traditional climb). Greenpointing refers to the process of even removing any existing in-situ sport climbing protection bolts to ascend the route as a cleaner traditional climb. Alpine climbers seek to complete established high-altitude "expedition style" routes in alpine style with no supplemental oxygen or any fixed ropes, and even alone. Free solo climbers seek to ascend a route with no protection equipment whatsoever (e.g. as in the 2018 film, Free Solo). Some big wall climbers set speed records on routes (e.g. The Nose).

== Debates about routes ==
=== Naming of routes ===
Traditionally, in many countries, the person who made the first ascent of a route was allowed to name it (in France, the naming rights go to whoever first bolted the route); this concept of "naming ownership" by the first ascensionist led to inertia with regard to the changing of problematic names including route names that were vulgar or had racial, sexual, colonial, discriminatory or other, slurs, tropes or stereotyping.

In 2020, the climbing community more directly confronted the issue of problematic names. In June 2020, climbing author Andrew Bisharat wrote in Rock & Ice that "routes belong to us all. That should include their names" in regard to changing problematic names. At the same time, Duane Raleigh, the editor of Rock & Ice, stepped down from his post recognizing some problematic names that he had given his own routes in the past. The debate intensified, reaching national media attention in countries around the world, and was described as climbing's "#MeToo" moment.

In 2021, the American Alpine Club created the "Climb United" initiative to bring magazine editors, guidebook publishers and database managers, and other climbing community leaders together to create principles for naming routes that would "Build the best publishing practices to avoid harm caused by discriminatory or oppressive route names". Many climbing guidebook publishers and route databases introduced policies to redact inappropriate route names, including the largest online databases, theCrag.com, and MountainProject.com (who had redacted 6,000 names in the first year).

=== Manufactured or artificial routes ===
Some climbers have physically altered the natural rock surface to "construct" a route (or make a route more climbable), by cutting or expanding handholds, which is also known as chipping. Such acts have at times caused controversy (e.g. Fred Rouhling's Akira and Hugh), but at other times has not (e.g. Antoine Le Menestrel's famous Buoux route, La Rose et la Vampire). A 2022 survey by Climbing showed climbers were largely against manufacturing routes on natural outdoor rock on public lands, but were less negative on private lands (or on routes in quarries); they were willing to allow "cleaning" of routes (which some consider manufacturing), and also the repairing of routes (e.g. gluing back broken holds).

In contrast, indoor climbing is done on completely artificially manufactured sport climbing routes on climbing walls, as is competition climbing where a route setter manufactures a completely new route for each stage of the competition. In 2017, Black Diamond Equipment launched "The Project" on an indoor climbing wall in Sweden, with the aim of creating the world's hardest sport climbing route at circa. 5.15d (9c); it was later deconstructed having never been fully ascended, despite attempts by some of the world's best climbers, including Adam Ondra, Stefano Ghisolfi, and Alex Megos. Since then, other "Project-type" routes have been created on other climbing walls, with the goal of being the world's hardest route.

=== Permanent-protection and retro-bolting of routes ===
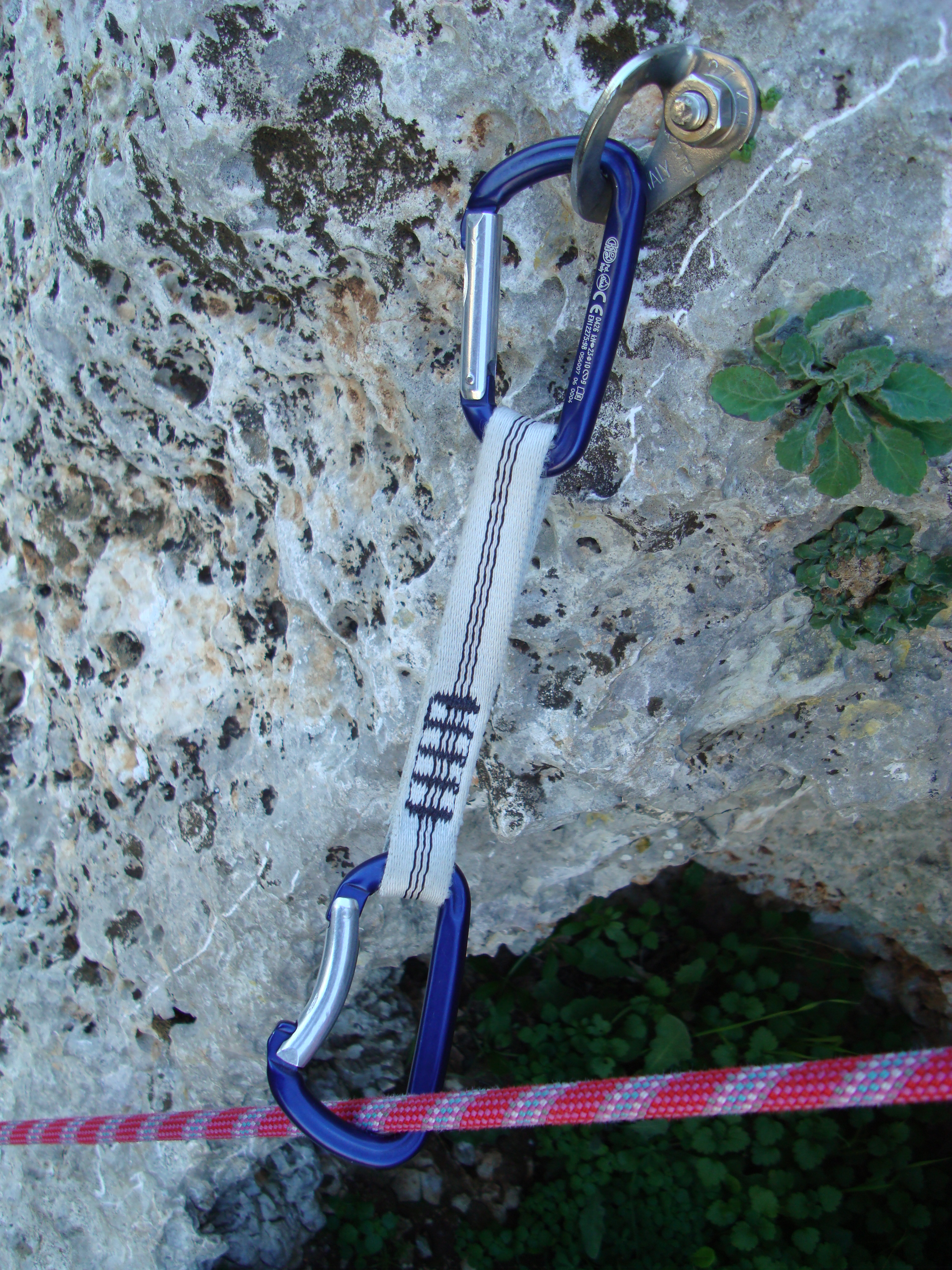
In-situ sport climbing protection with a rope clipped into a quickdraw that is clipped into a fixed climbing bolt.

There has been a long-term debate in the climbing world on the use of permanently fixed in-situ climbing protection (e.g. such as bolts or pitons) on climbing routes. Such protection is not to provide aid (i.e. it is not aid-climbing per se), but to increase the safety of the route. Climbers call routes that have such protection, "sport climbing routes" (i.e. there is no risk, so it is purely a sport). In the 1980s and 1990s in the US, this debate became so heated that it was known as the "bolt wars", with climbers bolt chopping (i.e. removing in-situ protection) on routes considered to be traditional-only routes (i.e. no in-situ protection).

While all indoor climbing routes are bolted sport routes, the use of bolts in the outdoor natural environment raised environmental considerations, which led to the development of the clean climbing movement.

Other objections to pre-bolted protection highlighted the effect that such protection had on the very nature and challenge of a climbing route. In 1971, Italian mountaineer Reinhold Messner wrote a famous essay called The Murder of the Impossible (which was believed to have been inspired by the 400-bolt Compressor Route), challenging that the use of such protection was diminishing the nature of mountaineering, saying of such climbers: "he carries his courage in his rucksack, in the form of bolts and equipment". Such concerns also relate to the debate on retro-bolting of traditional climbing routes, which is the conversion into safer sport climbing routes, but that also fundamentally alters the nature of the route challenge.

== Notable routes ==
=== Rock climbing ===
- Bouldering. Two of the most famous bouldering routes in history are Midnight Lightning V8 (7B/7B+) in California, and Dreamtime V15 (8C) in Switzerland. Other notable bouldering routes include Gioia in Italy, the world's first-ever V16 (8C+) graded route, and Burden of Dreams in Finland, the world's first-ever V17 (9A) graded route.
- Sport climbing. Two of the most famous sport climbing routes in history are Action Directe in Germany, the world's first-ever 9a (5.14d) route, and Realization/Biographie in France, the world's first consensus 9a+ (5.15a) route. Other notable sport climbing routes include Jumbo Love in Nevada, the world's first-ever 9b (5.15b) sport route, and Silence in Norway, the world's first-ever 9c (5.15d) sport route.
- Traditional climbing. Traditional climbing was at the origin of free climbing, and many countries have their own notable traditional routes (e.g. Indian Face in Britain). Routes that set important milestones include Grand Illusion in Lake Tahoe, first 8a (5.13b), The Phoenix in Yosemite, first 7c+ (5.13a) and the first-ever use of "friends", and Super Crack in the Shawangunks, early consensus 7b+ (5.12c). Notable contemporary traditional climbing routes include Cobra Crack in Canada, Rhapsody in Britain, Blackbeard’s Tears and Meltdown in the US, and Tribe in Italy.
- Big wall climbing and aid climbing. Many of the most famous aid climbing routes were on big wall routes, which eventually became free climbing routes. The most famous route is The Nose whose aid ascent at 5.9 A2 was a major milestone in climbing, as was its eventual freeing at 5.14a. El Capitan has several other famous aid/big wall routes such as Salathé Wall (5.9 A2 aid, or 5.13b free) and the Salathé variant, Freerider, the most famous big wall free solo in history, and Dawn Wall, the first-ever 9a big wall route in history. Notable European routes are the north faces of the Tre Cime di Lavaredo in the Dolomites (e.g. Bellavista), and on the southwest face of the Aiguille du Dru in France (e.g. Bonatti Pillar).

=== Ice climbing ===
- Ice climbing. Notable ice routes include the first to get near/above the WI6 grade milestone (i.e. sheer vertical sustained ice) such as Gimme Shelter, Riptide, and Sea of Vapours in the Canadian Rockies, and Repentance Super in the Val di Cogne in Italy. Since 2010, Helmcken Falls in Canada has produced overhanging ice climbs above the WI10 grade, including Mission to Mars the world's first-ever WI13 graded ice route.
- Mixed climbing. The most famous route is Jeff Lowe's Octopussy WI6 M8 R, which started the mixed climbing revolution; this was followed by early consensus M10-12 routes in Europe and North America such as Reptile in Vail, Colorado, X-files and Empire Strikes Back in Val di Cogne, and Musashi in Canada. Iron Man in Switzerland became the world's first consensus M14, and also the world's first-ever FFFA of an M14.
- Dry tooling. Notable routes include Bichette Light in France, the world's first-ever D14 (and with no mixed/ice component). The Tomorrow's World Cave in the Dolomites in Italy produced the world's first-ever consensus D15 (A Line Above the Sky), and consensus D16 (Parallel World) routes.

=== Mountaineering ===
- Alpine climbing. One of the most famous alpine climbing routes is the 1938 Heckmair Route (ED2 V− A0 60 degrees), on the north face of the Eiger. The route is also one of the famous six alpine routes that first ascended the great north faces of the Alps. As alpine climbing spread outside of the Alps, famous alpine style routes were established on Himalayan peaks such as Latok I, The Ogre, Changabang, and Jannu.
- Expedition climbing. The most famous expedition climbing routes involve the eight-thousanders, which are the 14 mountains in the Himalayas and the Karakoram above 8,000 metres (26,247 ft) in height above sea level. While reaching the summits of eight-thousanders by any route was once considered a major milestone, the development of even harder climbs on their faces and pillars has created several famous routes amongst climbers including the "Rupal Face" on Nanga Parbat and the "Magic Line" on K2's southwest pillar; both of which have been tried by alpine climbers.

== See also ==
- Alpine route
- Glossary of climbing terms
- List of grade milestones in rock climbing
- The Himalayan Database, database of climbing routes
