= Midnight Lightning (climb) =

Bouldering route in Yosemite, US

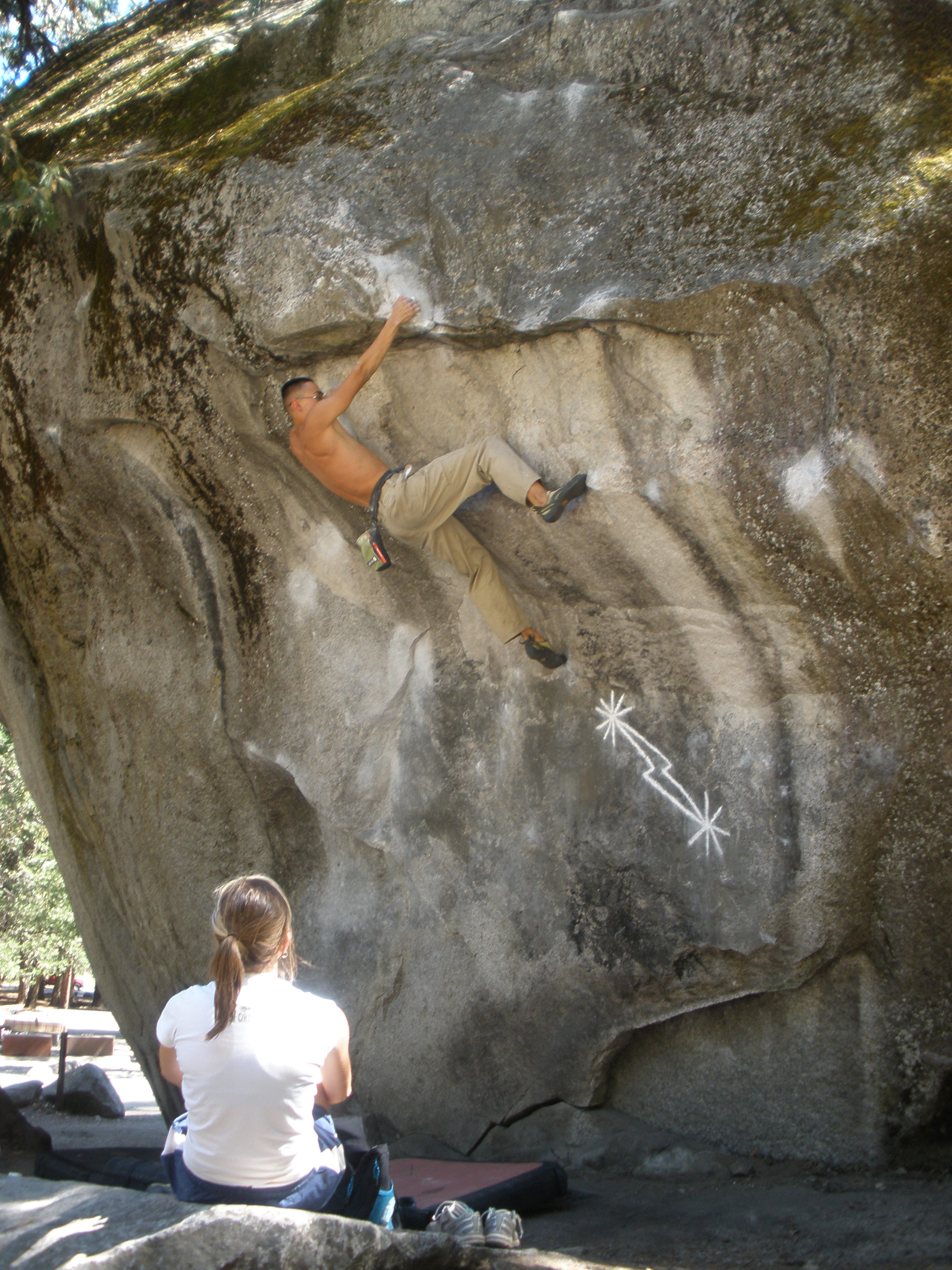
- Climber holding the "lip" on Midnight Lightning, preparing for the mantel-move

- Location within California Location within the United States
- Location: Yosemite National Park
- Coordinates: 37°44′30″N 119°36′07″W
- Climbing area: Camp 4 (Yosemite)
- Route type: Bouldering
- Rock type: Granite
- Vertical gain: 7.62-metre (25.0 ft)
- Technical grade: V8 (7B/7B+)
- First free ascent: Ron Kauk, May 1978
- First female free ascent: Lynn Hill, May 1998
- Known for: Second-ever consensus V8 (7B/7B+) in history

Midnight Lightning is a 7.62-metre (25.0 ft) high granite bouldering route on the Columbia Boulder in Camp 4 of Yosemite National Park. When first solved in May 1978 by American rock climber Ron Kauk, it was one of the hardest bouldering routes in the US. At that time, there was no universal grading system for boulders in the US. By the 90s when the "V" grades became dominant, it was graded V8. Even today, the route is still considered a "hard" V8. Midnight Lightning is perhaps the most famous bouldering route in climbing (along with Dreamtime), and its ascent is considered an important moment in the history and the development of bouldering as a sport in its own right.

== History ==
It is believed that bouldering pioneer John "Yabo" Yablonski (the inventor of the sit start) discovered the line of a potential new bouldering problem on the Columbia boulder while wandering around Camp 4 in a drug-intoxicated state in early 1978. Yablonski showed it to Yosemite's two leading rock climbers, Ron Kauk and John Bachar. Bachar recounted: "It was Yabo [John Yablonski] who actually 'found' Midnight Lightning. He was sitting in front of it one day and came over to me and Ron Kauk and said he found a new boulder problem. He said it would go. We laughed and said it was impossible. We thought there was about as much chance of doing it as there was the chance that a lightning bolt could strike at midnight (like in the Hendrix song Midnight Lightning), so I drew a bolt on it in chalk. That's it—pretty stupid, huh?"

Kauk and Bachar set to work attempting the route and, while making good early progress, continuously failed to execute the awkward mantel-move needed to overcome the "lip" which is at a height of almost 5 metres (16 ft). Eventually, in May 1978, Kauk overcame the mantle and completed the first ascent. Just after that, a small hold broke off, which made the final move a bit harder. Bachar made the second ascent shortly afterward. After completing his ascent, Bachar drew the chalk lightning bolt on the boulder. The route repelled all repetition attempts for 5 years, despite the pair being able to repeat it continuously, and often to an audience, with Kauk recounting: "We always waited until as many people as possible had gathered, then it was showtime".

Their ascent would eventually be recognized as only the second-ever ascent of a 7B+ (V8) graded boulder in history. However, by May 1978 there already were five or six other boulder routes in the world that, although shorter and safer, were technically more difficult. than Midnight Lightning. The first female ascent was by Lynn Hill in 1998, although it was not the first-ever 7B+ (V8) ascent by a female (that was by Catherine Miquel in 1989 on Le Carnage). The second female ascent was by Lisa Rands in 2001.

In 2002, Kauk's son Lonnie ascended the route, which he attributed to being the "key" that unlocked his path into professional adventure sports.

=== Lightning bolt removal ===
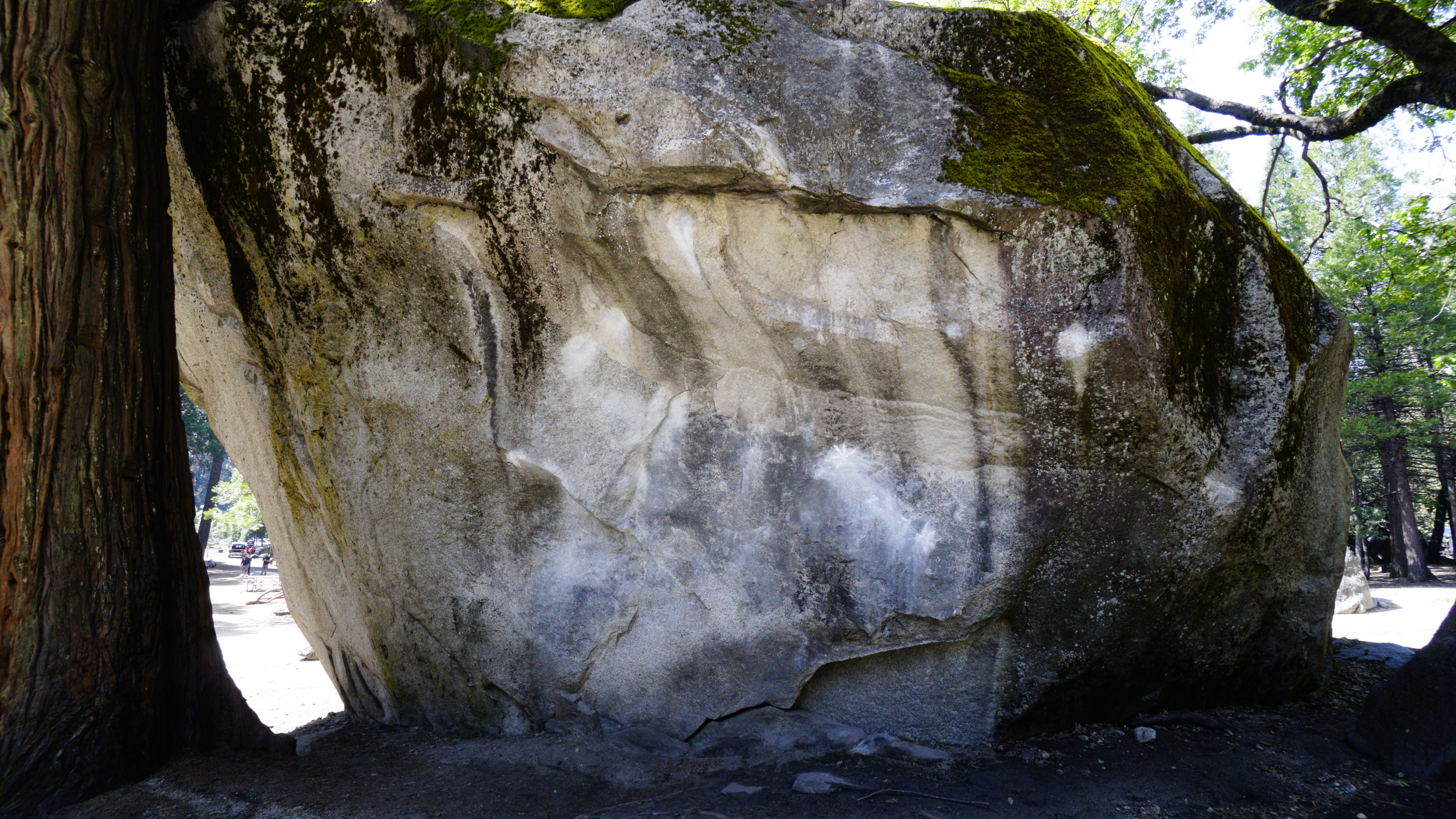
The iconic chalk lightning bolt has been removed several times.

In May 2013, the chalk-drawn lightning bolt was scrubbed off the boulder, by climber and Climbing magazine contributor James Lucas, who claimed the image had lost its magic, and was now more of a trademark or tourist attraction. The bolt was re-drawn in the same location a few days later. Since then, there have been other incidents, but Kauk and others have regularly restored the chalk bolt image.

== Route ==
Sam Moses, writing in Sports Illustrated said the most difficult move on Midnight Lightning is a "spider-monkey swing 15 feet (4.6 metres) off the ground. The climber must suspend themself by the fingertips of their left hand, swing around a ledge of rock, and propel themself far enough up, about four feet, to grab a precarious fingertip hold with their right hand. To do that they have to create momentum from stillness."

== Legacy ==
Midnight Lightning is often called the world's most famous bouldering route. In a 2009 article on the famous V15 boulder, Dreamtime, PlanetMountain called it: "... one of the most famous boulders in the world, second perhaps only to Midnight Lightning ...". In a similar vein in 2015, Climbing called Dreamtime: ".. arguably the first internationally famous boulder problem since Midnight Lightning".

The first ascent was not only an important part of Yosemite climbing history, but was also a major milestone in the development of bouldering as a sport in its own right, with one of the hardest known bouldering routes in the world – and the first consensus V8 route – now established in the middle of Camp 4, which was one of the most important gathering places for the world's leading rock climbers. The ascent led to a dramatic increase in interest in bouldering as a standalone sport, and an increase new bouldering technical and grade milestones.

In 2021, when the American Alpine Club awarded the Underhill Lifetime Achievement award to Kauk, their citation read: "Perhaps Ron's most iconic climbing achievement is a boulder problem right in the middle of Camp 4 known as Midnight Lightning". In a 2017 documentary on his first ascent, Kauk said that: "... to this day [it] has had an effect on my personal sense of place and history, within the climbing community, throughout the world".

== Ascents ==
The first ascents of Midnight Lightning include:

- 1st. Ron Kauk in May 1978.
- 2nd. John Bachar in May 1978.
- 3rd. Skip Guerin in 1983.
- 4th. Kurt Smith (the "General") in 1984.
- 5th. Scott Cosgrove in 1984, very soon after Kurt climbed it.
- 6th. Jerry Moffatt in 1985; first ascent in a day.
- 7th. Celso "Finuco" Martínez in June 1986.

The first female free ascents (FFFA) include:

- 1st. Lynn Hill in May 1998.
- 2nd. Lisa Rands in January 2001.
- 3rd. Angie Payne in 2004.
- 4th. Ally Dorey in May 2006.
- 5th. Andrea Szekely in November 2009.

== Filmography ==
- Documentary with Ron Kauk, David Sjöquist and Caro North on Midnight Lightning: The Classics Boulder Episode 1 Midnight Lightning (Motion picture). Mammut. June 2017.

== See also ==
- History of rock climbing
- List of grade milestones in rock climbing
- Dreamtime, famous V15 (8C) boulder in Cresciano, Switzerland
- The Mandala, famous V12 (8A+) boulder in The Buttermilks, California
- The Wheel of Life, famous V15 (8C) boulder in the Grampians, Australia
