= Chipping (climbing) =

Controversial rock climbing technique

Chipping is a rock climbing technique that uses a hammer and chisel to manufacture new or increased hand-holds on the natural rock to make a climbing route more feasible. It is a controversial technique due to both environmental issues, and a sense that it goes against the very challenge of free climbing. The practice was more common in the past; it is considered less acceptable in modern climbing.

== History ==
The process of chipping has been around since the first ascents of famous routes such as "Outer Limits" in 1971 and "The Nose" of El Capitan in Yosemite in 1958 when chipping was acceptable. Route manufacturing continued on through the clean climbing revolution of the 1970s where climbers moved away from outdated climbing technology, such as pitons, that damage rock to removable protection, such as nuts that do not damage the rock. Pitons are pins that are hammered into the rock, whereas nuts are small pieces of metal that fit into cracks and are removable. Manufacturing persisted on into the 1990s, especially in crags (an area that contains rock walls for climbing) in France. There are many instances of routes that are partially or even completely manufactured that were first put up in the mid 1990s in Europe. An example of this is L'autre Côté du Ciel by Fred Rouhling, or La Rose eh le Vampire by Antoine Le Menestrel (both in France). As indoor rock climbing gyms spread across the world in the mid 1990s, chipping seemed to subside as climbers could now create interesting routes with no need to modify rock.

== Ethical controversy ==
Once the mid 1990s had passed, the manufacturing of routes also began to subside as many climbers decided that it was a mistake to change the natural features of routes. In many crags, especially around the United States, chipping is not only frowned upon by the community but also illegal. This fact though does not stop practice in many areas.

=== Proponents ===
Even though it is generally accepted that chipping is a bad practice, some climbing areas allow it. Some climbers in areas such as Riggins, Idaho have accepted the use of chipping for the creation of new routes. Those who support chipping in these select few climbing areas accept this practice because the area's rock face is blank and climbs would be physically impossible without manufactured holds. The general consensus in these areas seems to be that the common belief against chipping is less important than having areas to climb.

=== Opposition ===
One of the main arguments against chipping is that as climbers try to push their limits and find harder routes to climb, chipped routes lower the difficulty and possibly ruin a route that could have been an interesting climb to a better climber. To some, like climbing guide book author Stewart Green, chipped routes reflect "egotism, selfishness, and mediocrity." According to Dave Graham there is a limited amount of climbable rock in the world and that by manufacturing a route it is impossible to ever put the rock back to its natural state.

== Environmental issues ==
As more climbers join the sport every year, the environmental impact of climbing increases. Without clean climbing practices, techniques such as chipping have been shown to possibly compromise areas where rock climbing takes place. In an effort to partake in this endeavor, the National Park Service educates those looking to climb on its properties about the negative impact that practices like chipping have on natural resources. Climbers are usually informed about these issues during the process of picking up national park permits.

== In the media ==
In February 2013, an anonymous video of world class climber Ivan Greene was released. This video showed him chipping a climb on a boulder in the famous Gunks climbing crag in New York. Due to the release of this video, Ivan Greene was dropped by his sponsor Edelrid who publicly announced that they would be cutting all ties to him.

== See also ==
- Clean climbing
