= Fred Nicole =

Swiss rock climber

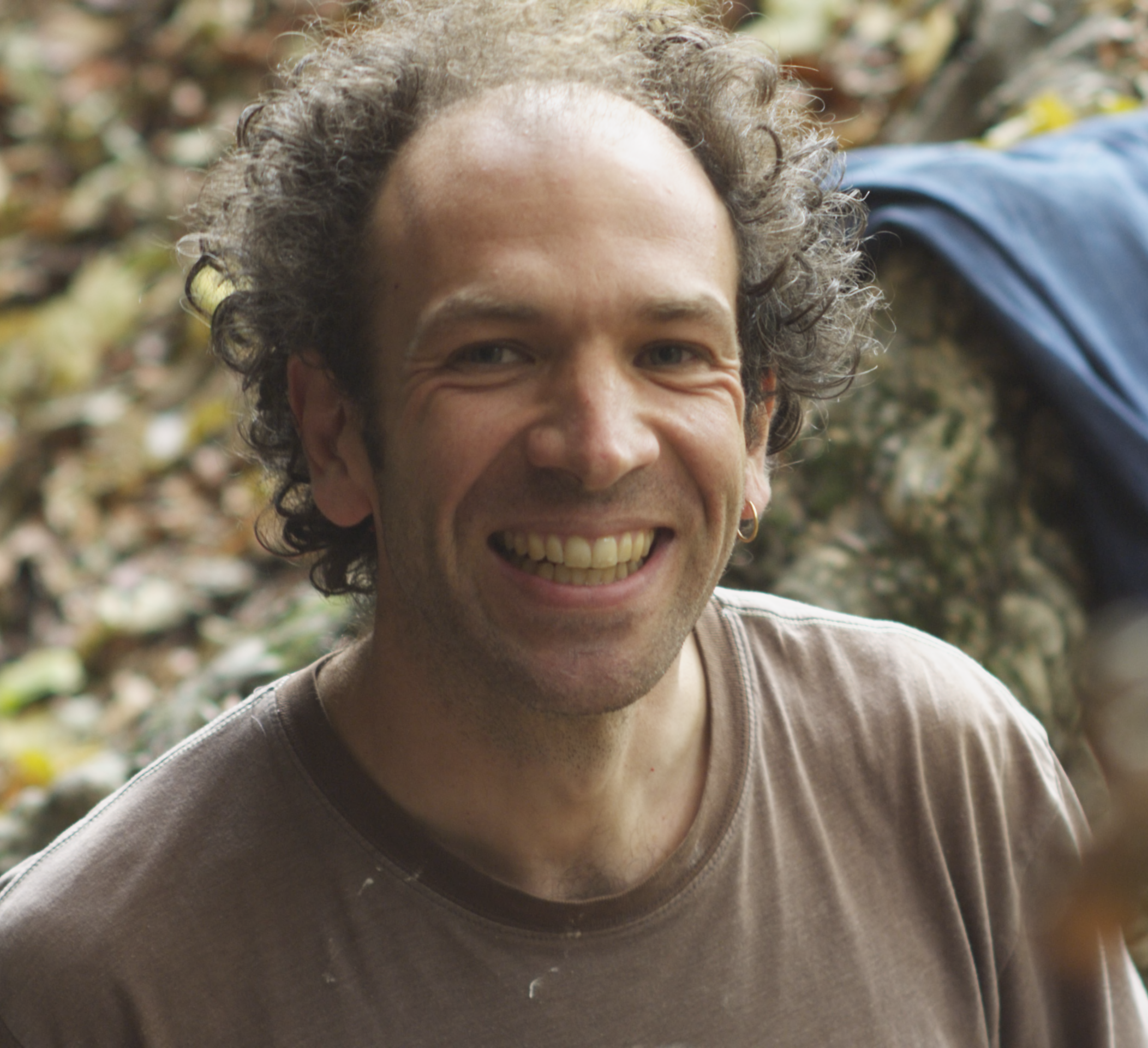
- Fred Nicole, March 2012

Personal information
- Born: Frédéric Nicole; 21 May 1970 (age 56) Le Lieu, Switzerland
- Height: 180 cm (5 ft 11 in)

Climbing career
- Type of climber: Sport climbing; Bouldering
- Highest grade: Bouldering: 8C (V15)
- First ascents: Anaïs et le canabis (8c, 1988); Bain de Sang (9a, 1993); Danse des Balrogs (8B, 1992); Radja (8B+, 1996); Dreamtime (8B+/C, 2000); Monkey Wedding (8C, 2002); Black Eagle SDS (8C, 2002)
- Known for: First to climb boulder grade of 8B (V13), 8B+ (V14), 8C (V15); Second to climb sport grade of 8c (5.14b); Third to climb sport grade of 9a (5.14d)
- Updated on 8 December 2022

Frédéric Nicole (born 21 May 1970) is a Swiss rock climber known for his first ascents of extreme sport climbing routes and for pioneering the development of standards and techniques in modern bouldering in the 1990s and early 2000s; he is considered an important climber in the history of the sport.

== Climbing career ==
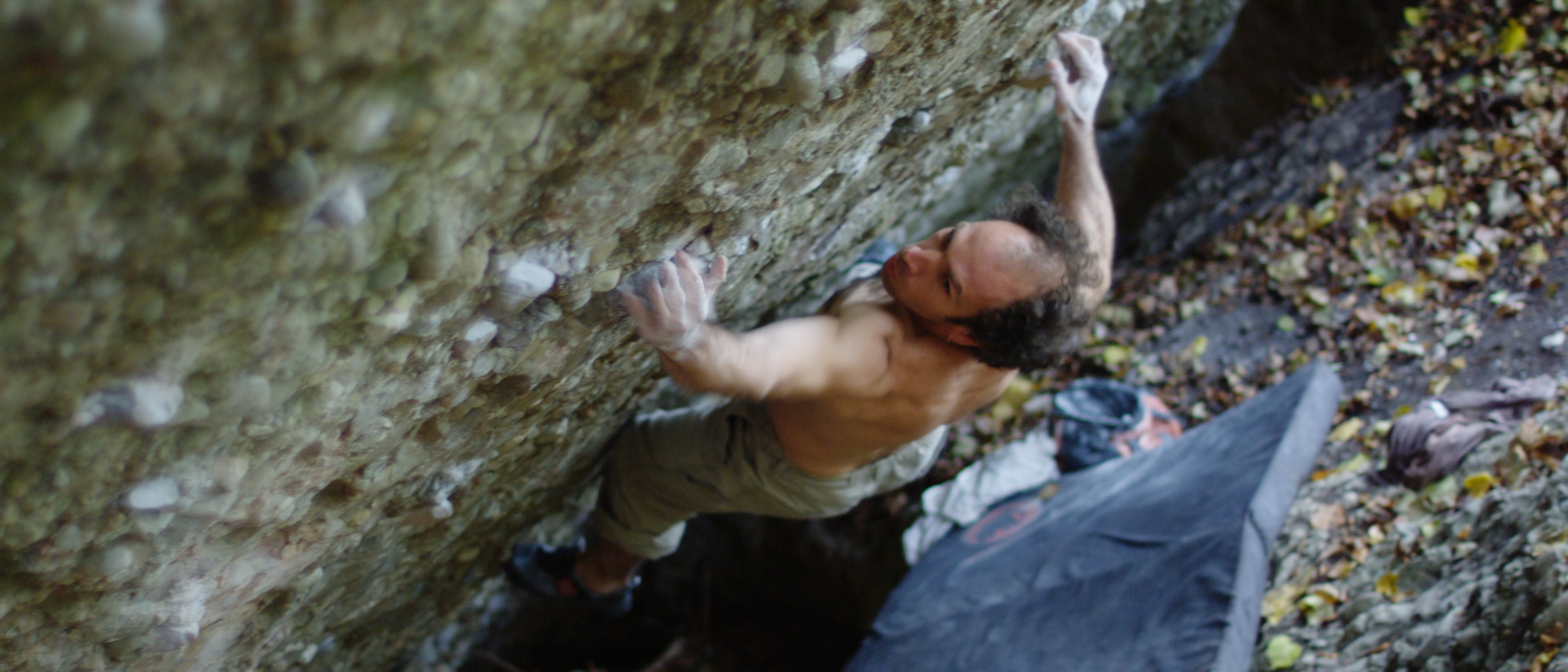
Nicole on Le Boa (8C/V15), Switzerland (March 2012)

In 1992, Nicole solved La Danse des Balrogs, in Branson, Switzerland, which is considered the first-ever 8B (V13) in bouldering history. In 1996, he solved Radja, also in Branson, which is also now considered the first-ever 8B+ (V14) graded boulder in history.

In 2002, he solved Monkey Wedding and Black Eagle SDS in Rocklands, South Africa, which is now considered to be the first-ever 8C (V15) graded boulder in history. In 2000, Nicole solved Dreamtime in Cresciano in Switzerland, which at the time was considered the first-ever 8C (V15) boulder in history, but its consensus grade was subsequently softened; the beauty and challenge of Dreamtime have maintained its status as an important route in bouldering history.

Nicole has also made important first ascents in sport climbing. In 1988, he redpointed the second-ever 8c (5.14b) in history with Anaïs et le canabis in Saint-Loup in Switzerland. In 1993, he redpointed the third-ever 9a (5.14d) in history with Bain de Sang, also in Saint-Loup in Switzerland.

== See also ==
- John Gill, a pioneer in modern bouldering
- John Sherman, a pioneer in modern bouldering
- List of grade milestones in rock climbing
- History of rock climbing
