= Rocklands, South Africa =

Bouldering destination, South Africa

Rocklands
- Location within South Africa
- Location: West Coast, Western Cape, South Africa
- Nearest city: Clanwilliam, Western Cape
- Range: Cederberg mountains
- Coordinates: 32°08′59″S 19°01′46″E
- Type of climbing: Bouldering, Sport and Trad
- NCCS grades: 2A - 8C+
- Rock type: Sandstone
- Season: Autumn, Winter, Spring
- Elevation: 200m - 1000m
- Classic climbs: Rubik's Cube, The Arête/ First Impressions, Orange Plasma, Ceder Rouge, Cattle Rustler,

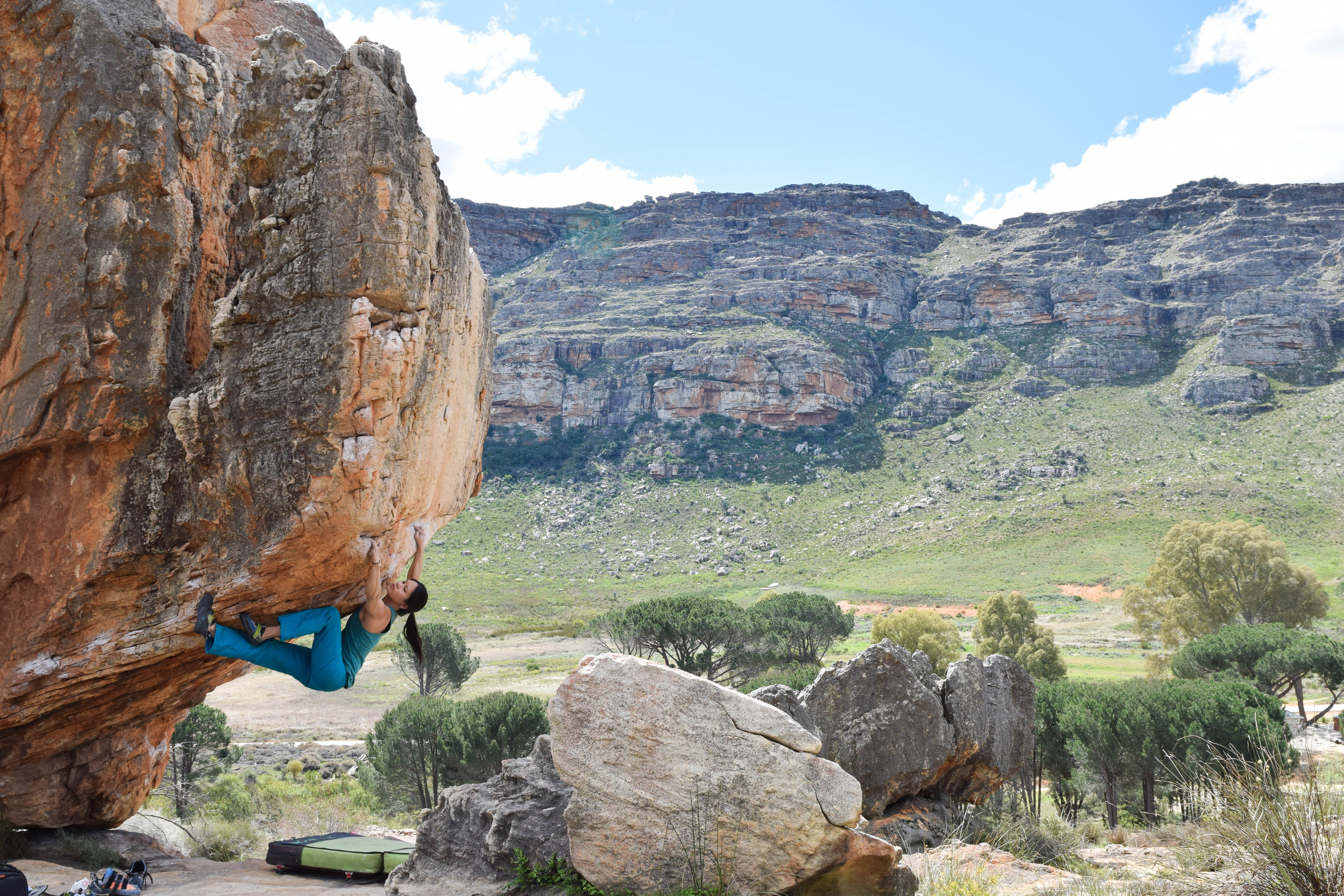
Climber on Tea Time 7C+ (V10)

Rocklands is a popular bouldering destination in South Africa. It is located less than 200km North of Cape Town, on the edge of the Cederberg Mountains.

The area is known for its abundance of bright-orange sandstone boulders. There are over 4.3 thousand established boulder problems. Boulderers have frequented Rocklands since 1996, when Todd Skinner, Fred Nicole, and others began documenting bouldering routes in the area.

Most climbing in Rocklands is done on private land, and permits are required to do so.
