= List of sport climbers at the 2020 Summer Olympics =

This is the list of sport climbers who participated at the 2020 Summer Olympics in Tokyo, Japan from 3 to 6 August.

== Male sport climbers ==
NOC	Name	Date of birth	Height (m / ft in)
Australia	Tom O'Halloran	22 July 1992 (aged 29)	1.80 / 5'11''
Austria	Jakob Schubert	31 December 1990 (aged 30)	1.76 / 5'9''
Canada	Sean McColl	3 September 1987 (aged 33)	1.69 / 5'7''
China	Pan Yufei	23 June 2000 (aged 21)	1.73 / 5'8''
Czech Republic	Adam Ondra	5 February 1993 (aged 28)	1.86 / 6'1''
France	Bassa Mawem	9 November 1984 (aged 36)	1.84 / 6'0''
France	Mickaël Mawem	3 August 1990 (aged 30)	1.79 / 5'10'
Germany	Jan Hojer	9 February 1992 (aged 29)	1.88 / 6'2''
Germany	Alexander Megos	12 August 1993 (aged 27)	1.75 / 5'9''
Italy	Ludovico Fossali	21 May 1997 (aged 24)	1.85 / 6'1''
Italy	Michael Piccolruaz	31 December 1995 (aged 25)	1.78 / 5'10''
Japan	Kai Harada	10 March 1999 (aged 22)	1.69 / 5'7''
Japan	Tomoa Narasaki	22 June 1996 (aged 25)	1.70 / 5'7''
Kazakhstan	Rishat Khaibullin	21 September 1995 (aged 25)	1.70 / 5'7''
ROC	Aleksey Rubtsov	5 August 1988 (aged 32)	1.78 / 5'10''
South Africa	Christopher Cosser	12 December 2000 (aged 20)	1.78 / 5'10''
South Korea	Jongwon Chon	7 February 1996 (aged 25)	1.76 / 5'9''
Spain	Alberto Ginés López	23 October 2002 (aged 18)	1.78 / 5'10''
United States	Nathaniel Coleman	1 January 1997 (aged 24)	1.82 / 6'0''
United States	Colin Duffy	10 December 2003 (aged 17)	1.68 / 5'6''

== Female sport climbers ==
NOC	Name	Date of birth	Height (m / ft in)
Australia	Oceana Mackenzie	11 July 2002 (aged 19)	1.73 / 5'8''
Austria	Jessica Pilz	22 November 1996 (aged 24)	1.65 / 5'5''
Canada	Alannah Yip	26 October 1993 (aged 27)	1.64 / 5'5''
China	Song Yiling	28 January 2001 (aged 20)	1.64 / 5'5''
France	Julia Chanourdie	25 June 1996 (aged 25)	1.64 / 5'5''
France	Anouck Jaubert	27 January 1994 (aged 27)	1.69 / 5'7''
Great Britain	Shauna Coxsey	27 January 1993 (aged 28)	1.63 / 5'4''
Italy	Laura Rogora	28 April 2001 (aged 20)	1.52 / 5'0''
Japan	Akiyo Noguchi	30 May 1989 (aged 32)	1.67 / 5'6''
Japan	Miho Nonaka	21 May 1997 (aged 24)	1.63 / 5'4''
Poland	Aleksandra Mirosław	2 February 1994 (aged 27)	1.62 / 5'4''
ROC	Iuliia Kaplina	11 May 1993 (aged 28)	1.65 / 5'5''
ROC	Viktoria Meshkova	20 September 2000 (aged 20)	1.61 / 5'3''
South Africa	Erin Sterkenburg	20 March 2003 (aged 18)	1.63 / 5'4''
South Korea	Seo Chae-hyun	1 November 2003 (aged 17)	1.62 / 5'4''
Slovenia	Janja Garnbret	12 March 1999 (aged 22)	1.64 / 5'5''
Slovenia	Mia Krampl	21 July 2000 (aged 21)	1.63 / 5'4''
Switzerland	Petra Klingler	14 February 1992 (aged 29)	1.62 / 5'4''
United States	Kyra Condie	5 June 1996 (aged 25)	1.62 / 5'4''
United States	Brooke Raboutou	9 April 2001 (aged 20)	1.58 / 5'2''
