= Sport climbing at the 2020 Summer Olympics – Qualification =

There were 40 quota spots available for sport climbing at the 2020 Summer Olympics (postponed to 2021 due to the COVID-19 pandemic). Each National Olympic Committee (NOC) could obtain a maximum of 2 spots in each event (total 4 maximum across the 2 events). Each event had 20 competitors qualify: 18 from qualifying, 1 from the host (Japan), and 1 from Tripartite Commission invitations.

== Timeline ==
Event	Date	Venue
World Championships	August 11–22, 2019	(Japan) Hachioji
World Olympic Qualifying Event	November 28 – December 1, 2019	(France) Toulouse
Pan American Championships	February 24 – March 1, 2020	(United States) Los Angeles
European Championships	November 19–29, 2020	(Russia) Moscow
Asian Championships	Cancelled	(Japan) Morioka (China) Xiamen
African Championships	December 17–20, 2020	(South Africa) Cape Town
Oceania Championships	December 19–20, 2020	(Australia) Sydney

The European, African, Oceania and Asian Championships were postponed due to the COVID-19 pandemic. The Asian Championship was later cancelled due to travel restrictions in Asian countries resulting from the pandemic.

== Qualification ==
Japan, as the host, was guaranteed at least one place. Initially the rules were interpreted such that this spot would only be used if no Japanese athlete would manage to qualify through the other qualifying events.

The first qualifying opportunity was the Combined World Championship, where the top seven finishers earned one quota place. Since four Japanese climbers qualified during this event (two male, two female), the unused Host Country Place went to the next highest placed climber in the Combined World Championships who is not yet qualified and doesn't come from a country with 2 climbers already qualified.

The second opportunity, the Olympic Qualifying Event featured the next 22 ranked athletes in the World Cup standings who had not yet received an Olympic invitation; of these, the top six qualified for the Olympic Games.

Between February and May 2020 each continent was to host a Continental Combined Championship, with the best finisher who is not already qualified earning a quota spot. Only the Pan-American Championships was held before the coronavirus pandemic halted competition. In February 2020, to address potential cancellations of continental championships due to the pandemic, IFSC updated the qualification guidelines to read, "Unused quota from any Continental Championship, will be reallocated to the next highest placed athlete from the relevant continent, not yet qualified, in the Combined World Championships 2019, respecting the maximum quota per gender per NOC."

With the IFSC Climbing Asian Championships cancelled, Jongwon Chon and Seo Chae-hyun, both of South Korea, are the qualifiers.

The Tripartite Commission invitation was to be allocated after the continental championships, but the deadline was missed, and places were awarded to the next highest qualified eligible finishers at 2019 World Championships.

=== Selection ===
After athletes qualify, they are allocated a quota space by the International Federation of Sport Climbing (IFSC), which must be confirmed by their National Olympic Committee (NOC). In some cases the NOC might choose not to use a quota place in order to decide who fills the quota at a later date. During the Combined World Championships Japanese climbers Akiyo Noguchi, Miho Nonaka, Tomoa Narasaki and Kai Harada earned a quota place, but only Noguchi and Narasaki were subsequently confirmed to qualify for the Olympics. Later the IFSC and the Japan Mountaineering and Sport Climbing Association (JMSCA) confirmed both Nonaka and Harada as Olympic-qualified athletes.

In November 2019 the Japanese Mountaineering and Sport Climbing Association (JMSCA) opened a lawsuit against the IFSC related to uncertainties in the qualification system and how the 'host place' qualification could be used. Associated rule changes also affected selection pathways for athletes from other countries. However, the Court for Arbitration in Sport (CAS) dismissed the suit in December 2020.

== Qualified countries ==
NOC	Men	Women	Total
Australia	1	1	2
Austria	1	1	2
Canada	1	1	2
China	1	1	2
Czech Republic	1		1
France	2	2	4
Germany	2		2
Great Britain		1	1
Italy	2	1	3
Japan	2	2	4
Kazakhstan	1		1
Poland		1	1
ROC^{†}	1	2	3
Slovenia		2	2
South Africa	1	1	2
South Korea	1	1	2
Spain	1		1
Switzerland		1	1
United States	2	2	4
Total: 19 NOCs	20	20	40

^{†} Russian athletes were allowed to compete in the Olympics under the acronym "ROC" using the flag of the Russian Olympic Committee.

== Qualified athletes ==
Standard	Places	Men's	Women's
Host place	1	Kai Harada (JPN)	Miho Nonaka (JPN)
World Championship	7	Tomoa Narasaki (JPN); Jakob Schubert (AUT); Rishat Khaibullin (KAZ); Mickaël Mawem (FRA); Alexander Megos (GER); Ludovico Fossali (ITA); Sean McColl (CAN)	Janja Garnbret (SLO); Akiyo Noguchi (JPN); Shauna Coxsey (GBR); Aleksandra Mirosław (POL); Petra Klingler (SUI); Brooke Raboutou (USA); Jessica Pilz (AUT)
World Olympic Qualifying Event	6	Adam Ondra (CZE); Bassa Mawem (FRA); Jan Hojer (GER); Pan Yufei (CHN); Alberto Ginés López (ESP); Nathaniel Coleman (USA)	Julia Chanourdie (FRA); Mia Krampl (SLO); Iuliia Kaplina (ROC); Kyra Condie (USA); Laura Rogora (ITA); Song Yiling (CHN)
Pan American Championships	1	Colin Duffy (USA)	Alannah Yip (CAN)
African Championships	1	Christopher Cosser (RSA)	Erin Sterkenburg (RSA)
European Championships	1	Alexey Rubtsov (ROC)	Viktoriia Meshkova (ROC)
Oceania Championships	1	Tom O'Halloran (AUS)	Oceana Mackenzie (AUS)
Asian Championships	0^{‡}	—	—
Tripartite Commission	0^{‡}	—	—
Reallocation	2	Chon Jong-won (KOR); Michael Piccolruaz (ITA)	Seo Chae-hyun (KOR); Anouck Jaubert (FRA)
Total	20		

^{‡} These slots were reallocated due to the Asian Championship being cancelled and the Tripartite Commission missing the deadline.
