= 2015 IFSC Climbing World Cup =

Climbing event

- Location: Central Saanich, Canada Toronto, Canada; Vail, United States; Chongqing, China; Haiyang, China; Chamonix, France; Briançon, France; Imst, Austria; Munich, Germany; Stavanger, Norway; Puurs, Belgium; Wujiang, China Kranj, Slovenia
- Date: 17 May – 15 November 2015

Champions
- Men: (B) (South Korea) Jongwon Chon (L) (Czech Republic) Adam Ondra (S) (China) Zhong Qixin (C) (Czech Republic) Adam Ondra
- Women: (B) (Japan) Akiyo Noguchi (L) (Slovenia) Mina Markovič (S) (Russia) Mariia Krasavina (C) (South Korea) Jain Kim

The 2015 IFSC Climbing World Cup was held in 13 locations. Bouldering competitions were held in 5 locations, lead in 7 locations, and speed in 5 locations. The season began on 17 May in Central Saanich, Canada and concluded on 15 November in Kranj, Slovenia.

The top 3 in each competition received medals, and the overall winners were awarded trophies. At the end of the season an overall ranking was determined based upon points, which athletes were awarded for finishing in the top 30 of each individual event.

The winners for bouldering were Jongwon Chon and Akiyo Noguchi, for lead Adam Ondra and Mina Markovič, and for speed Zhong Qixin and Mariia Krasavina, men and women respectively.

== Highlights of the season ==
In bouldering, at the World Cup in Munich, Shauna Coxsey of United Kingdom flashed all boulders in the final round to take the win.

In lead climbing, Janja Garnbret of Slovenia, after just turned 16 years old (the minimum age to compete in the World Cup), made her debut in the World Cup circuit by competing in lead climbing in Chamonix, France. She competed in 3 out of 7 Lead World Cups in the season and was in the top three in all competitions she attended, which made her 7th in the overall ranking in lead discipline.

In speed climbing, at the World Cup in Central Saanich, Iuliia Kaplina of Russia set a new world record of 7.74s in the semifinal round, breaking her previous world record of 7.85s which she set at the 2013 Speed World Cup in Wujiang. Then, at the World Cup in Chongqing, Iuliia Kaplina, again, set a new world record of 7.56s during qualifications, breaking her previous world record which she had set in Saanich (CAN), by as much as 0.18 seconds. Then at the World Cup in Chamonix, Iuliia Kaplina, again, set a new world record of 7.53s in the semifinal against her teammate Anna Tsyganova, breaking her previous world record by 0.03s.

France was the only nation in the top three National Team Ranking in all disciplines.

== Overview ==
No.	Location	D	G	Gold	Silver	Bronze
1	(Canada) Central Saanich (17 May 2015)	S	M	(China) Zhong Qixin; 6.260	(Poland) Marcin Dzieński; 7.010	(France) Bassa Mawem; 6.050
1	(Canada) Central Saanich (17 May 2015)	S	W	(Russia) Iuliia Kaplina; 7.820	(Russia) Mariia Krasavina; 8.710	(Russia) Anna Tsyganova; 8.040
2	(Canada) Toronto (30–31 May 2015)	B	M	(France) Alban Levier; 3t6 4b5	(United States) Nathaniel Coleman; 3t9 4b8	(Czech Republic) Adam Ondra; 2t3 3b3
2	(Canada) Toronto (30–31 May 2015)	B	W	(Austria) Anna Stöhr; 3t6 4b5	(Japan) Akiyo Noguchi; 3t7 4b7	(Germany) Juliane Wurm; 2t2 4b5
3	(United States) Vail (5–6 June 2015)	B	M	(Germany) Jan Hojer; 3t4 4b4	(United States) Nathaniel Coleman; 3t4 4b6	(Czech Republic) Adam Ondra; 3t12 4b12
3	(United States) Vail (5–6 June 2015)	B	W	(United States) Megan Mascarenas; 3t4 4b5	(Japan) Akiyo Noguchi; 2t4 3b6	(United Kingdom) Shauna Coxsey; 2t4 3b7
4	(China) Chongqing (20–21 June 2015)	B	M	(Canada) Sean McColl; 4t12 4b9	(South Korea) Jongwon Chon; 3t5 3b3	(Japan) Tsukuru Hori; 3t8 3b8
4	(China) Chongqing (20–21 June 2015)	B	W	(Japan) Akiyo Noguchi; 4t5 4b5	(Japan) Miho Nonaka; 3t5 4b4	(United Kingdom) Shauna Coxsey; 3t6 3b5
4	(China) Chongqing (20–21 June 2015)	S	M	(China) Zhong Qixin; 5.810	(Ukraine) Danyil Boldyrev; 6.560	(Czech Republic) Libor Hroza; 5.850
4	(China) Chongqing (20–21 June 2015)	S	W	(Russia) Mariia Krasavina; 7.920	(Poland) Edyta Ropek; 8.160	(Russia) Iuliia Kaplina; 8.030
5	(China) Haiyang (26–27 June 2015)	B	M	(South Korea) Jongwon Chon; 2t3 2b2	(Russia) Rustam Gelmanov; 2t7 2b6	(France) Alban Levier; 1t1 2b2
5	(China) Haiyang (26–27 June 2015)	B	W	(Switzerland) Petra Klingler; 3t3 4b10	(Japan) Akiyo Noguchi; 3t4 4b5	(United Kingdom) Shauna Coxsey; 3t84 b9
5	(China) Haiyang (26–27 June 2015)	S	M	(China) Zhong Qixin; 5.790	(Ukraine) Danyil Boldyrev; 6.720	(Iran) Reza Alipour; 6.020
5	(China) Haiyang (26–27 June 2015)	S	W	(France) Anouck Jaubert; 7.900	(Russia) Anna Tsyganova; 8.180	(Russia) Iuliia Kaplina; 7.710
6	(France) Chamonix (10–12 July 2015)	L	M	(Spain) Ramón Julián Puigblanqué; 53+	(Czech Republic) Adam Ondra; 52+	(Germany) Sebastian Halenke; 52
6	(France) Chamonix (10–12 July 2015)	L	W	(Slovenia) Mina Markovič; Top	(Slovenia) Janja Garnbret; Top	(Austria) Jessica Pilz; 47
6	(France) Chamonix (10–12 July 2015)	S	M	(Czech Republic) Libor Hroza wild card	(Ukraine) Danyil Boldyrev false start	(China) Zhong Qixin; 5.950
6	(France) Chamonix (10–12 July 2015)	S	W	(France) Anouck Jaubert; 7.810	(Russia) Iuliia Kaplina false start	(Russia) Mariia Krasavina; 8.030
7	(France) Briançon (17–18 July 2015)	L	M	(France) Gautier Supper; 49+	(Japan) Minoru Nakano; 43+	(Austria) Jakob Schubert; 42+
7	(France) Briançon (17–18 July 2015)	L	W	(South Korea) Jain Kim; 47+	(Austria) Jessica Pilz; 47+	(Belgium) Anak Verhoeven; 46+
8	(Austria) Imst (31 July – 1 August 2015)	L	M	(France) Romain Desgranges; 57+	(Austria) Jakob Schubert; 57	(Slovenia) Domen Škofic; 51+
8	(Austria) Imst (31 July – 1 August 2015)	L	W	(Slovenia) Mina Markovič; 55	(Slovenia) Janja Garnbret; 54+	(Austria) Jessica Pilz; 52+
9	(Germany) Munich (14–15 August 2015)	B	M	(Russia) Alexey Rubtsov; 2t11 4b12	(Czech Republic) Martin Stráník; 1t1 3b4	(South Korea) Jongwon Chon; 1t1 3b5
9	(Germany) Munich (14–15 August 2015)	B	W	(United Kingdom) Shauna Coxsey; 4t4 4b4	(France) Fanny Gibert; 3t3 4b7	(United States) Megan Mascarenas; 3t4 4b5
10	(Norway) Stavanger (21–22 August 2015)	L	M	(France) Gautier Supper; 43+	(Czech Republic) Adam Ondra; 40+	(France) Romain Desgranges; 39+
10	(Norway) Stavanger (21–22 August 2015)	L	W	(Slovenia) Mina Markovič; 57+	(Austria) Jessica Pilz; 57+	(Belgium) Anak Verhoeven; 55+
11	(Belgium) Puurs (26–27 September 2015)	L	M	(Slovenia) Domen Škofic; Top	(Austria) Jakob Schubert; 50+	(Spain) Ramón Julián Puigblanqué; 49+
11	(Belgium) Puurs (26–27 September 2015)	L	W	(South Korea) Jain Kim; Top	(Slovenia) Mina Markovič; Top	(Belgium) Anak Verhoeven; 48+
12	(China) Wujiang (17–18 October 2015)	L	M	(Czech Republic) Adam Ondra; 35	(Slovenia) Domen Škofic; 31	(Canada) Sean McColl; 28+
12	(China) Wujiang (17–18 October 2015)	L	W	(South Korea) Jain Kim; 40+	(Belgium) Anak Verhoeven; 34	(Austria) Jessica Pilz; 33+
12	(China) Wujiang (17–18 October 2015)	S	M	(Iran) Reza Alipour; 6.060	(Czech Republic) Libor Hroza fall	(France) Bassa Mawem; 7.490
12	(China) Wujiang (17–18 October 2015)	S	W	(Russia) Mariia Krasavina; 7.860	(France) Anouck Jaubert; 8.120	(Poland) Edyta Ropek; 12.310
13	(Slovenia) Kranj (14–15 November 2015)	L	M	(Czech Republic) Adam Ondra; 37+	(Canada) Sean McColl; 37	(Austria) Jakob Schubert; 36+
13	(Slovenia) Kranj (14–15 November 2015)	L	W	(Slovenia) Mina Markovič; 35+	(Austria) Jessica Pilz; 35+	(Slovenia) Janja Garnbret; 34+
OVERALL		B	M	(South Korea) Jongwon Chon; 292.00	(Germany) Jan Hojer; 264.00	(Czech Republic) Adam Ondra; 259.00
OVERALL		B	W	(Japan) Akiyo Noguchi; 395.00	(United Kingdom) Shauna Coxsey; 332.00	(Japan) Miho Nonaka; 276.00
OVERALL		L	M	(Czech Republic) Adam Ondra; 458.00	(France) Gautier Supper; 400.00	(Austria) Jakob Schubert; 396.00
OVERALL		L	W	(Slovenia) Mina Markovič; 527.00	(South Korea) Jain Kim; 461.00	(Austria) Jessica Pilz; 435.00
OVERALL		S	M	(China) Zhong Qixin; 405.00	(Czech Republic) Libor Hroza; 322.00	(Ukraine) Danyil Boldyrev; 295.00
OVERALL		S	W	(Russia) Mariia Krasavina; 400.00	(France) Anouck Jaubert; 390.00	(Russia) Iuliia Kaplina; 365.00
OVERALL		C	M	(Czech Republic) Adam Ondra; 674.00	(Canada) Sean McColl; 486.00	(Slovenia) Domen Škofic; 407.00
OVERALL		C	W	(South Korea) Jain Kim; 432.00	(Japan) Akiyo Noguchi; 421.00	(Japan) Yuka Kobayashi; 286.00
NATIONAL TEAMS		B	A	Japan; 1352	France; 855	United States; 670
NATIONAL TEAMS		L	A	France; 1635	Slovenia; 1457	Austria; 1400
NATIONAL TEAMS		S	A	(Russia) Russian Federation; 1614	Poland; 1188	France; 1007

== Bouldering ==
An overall ranking was determined based upon points, which athletes were awarded for finishing in the top 30 of each individual event.

=== Men ===
5 best competition results were counted (not counting points in brackets).

Rank	Name	Points	Munich	Haiyang	Chongqing	Vail	Toronto
1	(South Korea) Jongwon Chon	292.00	3. 65.00	1. 100.00	2. 80.00	-	6. 47.00
2	(Germany) Jan Hojer	264.00	5. 51.00	4. 55.00	4. 55.00	1. 100.00	27. 3.00
3	(Czech Republic) Adam Ondra	259.00	8. 38.00	5. 51.00	8. 40.00	3. 65.00	3. 65.00
4	(United States) Nathaniel Coleman	238.00	11. 31.00	11. 31.00	18. 16.00	2. 80.00	2. 80.00
5	(France) Alban Levier	202.00	29. 1.00	3. 65.00	14. 24.00	20. 12.00	1. 100.00
6	(Russia) Rustam Gelmanov	179.00	6. 47.00	2. 80.00	7. 43.00	21. 9.00	-
7	(Japan) Kokoro Fujii	173.00	27. 3.00	9. 37.00	11. 31.00	6. 47.00	4. 55.00
8	(Canada) Sean McColl	169.00	-	-	1. 100.00	5. 51.00	17. 18.00
9	(Japan) Rei Sugimoto	151.00	8. 38.00	15. 22.00	9. 37.00	8. 40.00	19. 14.00
10	(France) Jeremy Bonder	146.00	-	14. 24.00	5. 51.00	12. 28.00	7. 43.00

=== Women ===
5 best competition results were counted (not counting points in brackets).

Rank	Name	Points	Munich	Haiyang	Chongqing	Vail	Toronto
1	(Japan) Akiyo Noguchi	395.00	4. 55.00	2. 80.00	1. 100.00	2. 80.00	2. 80.00
2	(United Kingdom) Shauna Coxsey	332.00	1. 100.00	3. 65.00	3. 65.00	3. 65.00	9. 37.00
3	(Japan) Miho Nonaka	276.00	7. 43.00	4. 55.00	2. 80.00	4. 55.00	7. 43.00
4	(Switzerland) Petra Klingler	224.00	18. 16.00	1. 100.00	10. 34.00	7. 43.00	11. 31.00
5	(United States) Megan Mascarenas	165.00	3. 65.00	-	-	1. 100.00	-
6	(Austria) Katharina Saurwein	163.00	-	5. 51.00	9. 37.00	14. 24.00	5. 51.00
7	(South Korea) Sol Sa	158.00	8. 40.00	7. 43.00	6. 47.00	20. 12.00	18. 16.00
8	(France) Fanny Gibert	151.00	2. 80.00	-	-	11. 31.00	8. 40.00
8	(Austria) Anna Stöhr	151.00	-	-	-	5. 51.00	1. 100.00
10	(France) Mélissa Le Nevé	150.00	-	6. 47.00	8. 40.00	18. 16.00	6. 47.00

=== National Teams ===
For National Team Ranking, 3 best results per competition and category were counted (not counting results in brackets).

Country names as used by the IFSC

Rank	Nation	Points	Munich	Haiyang	Chongqing	Vail	Toronto
1	(Japan)	1352	172	299	368	285	228
2	France	855	109	170	127	142	307
3	United States	670	104	49	25	303	189
4	Germany	567	138	68	106	147	108
5	Austria	542	64	82	63	131	202
6	(South Korea) Republic of Korea	511	105	169	162	12	63
7	(United Kingdom) Great Britain	433	121	102	74	83	53
7	(Russia) Russian Federation	433	184	108	77	64	-
9	Czech Republic	365	121	51	40	85	68
10	Slovenia	329	99	37	27	74	92

== Lead ==
An overall ranking was determined based upon points, which athletes were awarded for finishing in the top 30 of each individual event.

=== Men ===
6 best competition results were counted (not counting results in parentheses).

Rank	Name	Points	Kranj	Wujiang	Puurs	Stavanger	Imst	Briançon	Chamonix
1	(Czech Republic) Adam Ondra	458.00	1. 100.00	1. 100.00	10. (32.00)	2. 80.00	4. 55.00	7. 43.00	2. 80.00
2	(France) Gautier Supper	400.00	8. (40.00)	7. 43.00	4. 55.00	1. 100.00	5. 51.00	1. 100.00	5. 51.00
3	(Austria) Jakob Schubert	396.00	3. 65.00	5. 51.00	2. 80.00	4. 55.00	2. 80.00	3. 65.00	6. (47.00)
4	(Slovenia) Domen Škofic	376.00	5. 51.00	2. 80.00	1. 100.00	7. 43.00	3. 65.00	9. 37.00	9. (37.00)
5	(France) Romain Desgranges	354.00	6. 47.00	12. (28.00)	6. 47.00	3. 65.00	1. 100.00	8. 40.00	4. 55.00
6	(Spain) Ramón Julián Puigblanqué	335.00	4. 55.00	4. 55.00	3. 65.00	10. 34.00	13. 26.00	26. (5.00)	1. 100.00
7	(Germany) Sebastian Halenke	259.00	12. 28.00	6. 47.00	10. 32.00	8. 40.00	6. 47.00	12. (27.00)	3. 65.00
8	(Canada) Sean McColl	253.00	2. 80.00	3. 65.00	-	13. 26.00	-	5. 51.00	11. 31.00
9	(Italy) Stefano Ghisolfi	252.00	13. 26.00	26. (5.00)	5. 51.00	5. 51.00	10. 34.00	6. 47.00	7. 43.00
10	(Japan) Minoru Nakano	240.00	7. 43.00	8. 40.00	14. 24.00	-	11. 31.00	2. 80.00	15. 22.00

=== Women ===
6 best competition results were counted (not counting results in parentheses).

Rank	Name	Points	Kranj	Wujiang	Puurs	Stavanger	Imst	Briançon	Chamonix
1	(Slovenia) Mina Markovič	527.00	1. 100.00	6. 47.00	2. 80.00	1. 100.00	1. 100.00	8. (40.00)	1. 100.00
2	(South Korea) Jain Kim	461.00	4. 55.00	1. 100.00	1. 100.00	4. 55.00	12. (28.00)	1. 100.00	5. 51.00
3	(Austria) Jessica Pilz	435.00	2. 80.00	3. 65.00	4. (55.00)	2. 80.00	3. 65.00	2. 80.00	3. 65.00
4	(Belgium) Anak Verhoeven	381.00	5. 51.00	2. 80.00	3. 65.00	3. 65.00	8. (40.00)	3. 65.00	4. 55.00
5	(France) Hélène Janicot	298.00	6. 47.00	4. 55.00	7. 43.00	5. 51.00	4. 55.00	11. (31.00)	6. 47.00
6	(Japan) Yuka Kobayashi	234.00	12. 28.00	5. 51.00	8. 40.00	8. 40.00	5. 51.00	14. 24.00	15. (22.00)
7	(Slovenia) Janja Garnbret	225.00	3. 65.00	-	-	-	2. 80.00	-	2. 80.00
8	(Japan) Risa Ota	217.00	10. 34.00	10. 32.00	-	7. 43.00	13. 26.00	5. 51.00	11. 31.00
9	(Slovenia) Tjasa Kalan	207.00	26. (5.00)	14. 24.00	10. 34.00	6. 47.00	6. 47.00	9. 37.00	17. 18.00
10	(France) Mathilde Becerra	201.00	7. 43.00	-	13. 26.00	9. 37.00	16. 20.00	4. 55.00	16. 20.00

=== National Teams ===
For National Team Ranking, 3 best results per competition and category were counted (not counting results in parentheses).

Rank	Nation	Points	Kranj	Wujiang	Puurs	Stavanger	Imst	Briançon	Chamonix
1	France	1635	236	(126)	269	301	302	283	244
2	Slovenia	1457	259	(151)	242	221	335	155	245
3	Austria	1400	243	245	252	213	240	207	(153)
4	(Japan)	1010	188	222	(109)	112	120	203	165
5	Belgium	573	63	98	111	104	97	100	(62)
6	Italy	556	68	73	125	124	95	71	(49)
7	(South Korea) Republic of Korea	495	55	100	100	55	(53)	116	69
8	Czech Republic	484	112	106	(32)	85	56	43	82
9	(Germany)	366	74	57	54	60	56	(51)	65
10	(Russia) Russian Federation	353	0	-	10	51	36	127	129

== Speed ==
An overall ranking was determined based upon points, which athletes were awarded for finishing in the top 30 of each individual event.

=== Men ===
5 best competition results were counted (not counting points in brackets).

Rank	Name	Points	Wujiang	Chamonix	Haiyang	Chongqing	Central Saanich
1	(China) Zhong Qixin	405.00	8. 40.00	3. 65.00	1. 100.00	1. 100.00	1. 100.00
2	(Czech Republic) Libor Hroza	322.00	2. 80.00	1. 100.00	5. 51.00	3. 65.00	13. 26.00
3	(Ukraine) Danyil Boldyrev	295.00	4. 55.00	2. 80.00	2. 80.00	2. 80.00	-
4	(Poland) Marcin Dzieński	277.00	5. 51.00	4. 55.00	8. 40.00	5. 51.00	2. 80.00
5	(France) Bassa Mawem	254.00	3. 65.00	15. 22.00	6. 47.00	4. 55.00	3. 65.00
6	(Russia) Aleksandr Shilov	216.00	6. 47.00	8. 40.00	11. 31.00	6. 47.00	5. 51.00
7	(Iran) Reza Alipour	208.00	1. 100.00	-	3. 65.00	7. 43.00	-
8	(Russia) Stanislav Kokorin	169.00	7. 43.00	7. 43.00	4. 55.00	12. 28.00	-
8	(France) Quentin Nambot	169.00	10. 34.00	10. 34.00	7. 43.00	10. 34.00	14. 24.00
10	(Kazakhstan) Amir Maimuratov	128.00	-	5. 51.00	9. 37.00	8. 40.00	-

=== Women ===
5 best competition results were counted (not counting points in brackets).

Rank	Name	Points	Wujiang	Chamonix	Haiyang	Chongqing	Central Saanich
1	(Russia) Mariia Krasavina	400.00	1. 100.00	3. 65.00	4. 55.00	1. 100.00	2. 80.00
2	(France) Anouck Jaubert	390.00	2. 80.00	1. 100.00	1. 100.00	4. 55.00	4. 55.00
3	(Russia) Iuliia Kaplina	365.00	4. 55.00	2. 80.00	3. 65.00	3. 65.00	1. 100.00
4	(Russia) Anna Tsyganova	291.00	8. 40.00	4. 55.00	2. 80.00	5. 51.00	3. 65.00
5	(Poland) Edyta Ropek	284.00	3. 65.00	5. 51.00	5. 51.00	2. 80.00	9. 37.00
6	(Poland) Aleksandra Mirosław	239.00	5. 51.00	7. 43.00	6. 47.00	6. 47.00	5. 51.00
7	(Poland) Klaudia Buczek	198.00	7. 43.00	9. 37.00	8. 40.00	11. 31.00	6. 47.00
8	(Poland) Patrycja Chudziak	148.00	-	15. 22.00	7. 43.00	7. 43.00	8. 40.00
9	(Ukraine) Alla Marenych	131.00	6. 47.00	10. 34.00	12. 28.00	15. 22.00	-
10	(Poland) Monika Prokopiuk	117.00	-	20. 12.00	9. 37.00	10. 34.00	10. 34.00

=== National Teams ===
For National Team Ranking, 3 best results per competition and category were counted (not counting results in brackets).

Rank	Nation	Points	Wujiang	Chamonix	Haiyang	Chongqing	Central Saanich
1	(Russia) Russian Federation	1614	316	320	314	313	351
2	Poland	1188	232	207	225	259	265
3	France	1007	205	239	210	144	209
4	People's Republic of China	587	127	65	132	163	100
5	Ukraine	490	102	178	108	102	-
6	Kazakhstan	352	-	51	148	153	-
7	Czech Republic	322	80	100	51	65	26
8	Islamic Republic of Iran	288	128	9	65	43	43
9	Canada	262	14	18	22	38	170
10	Austria	163	71	35	31	26	-

== Combined ==
5 best competition results were counted. Participation in at least 2 disciplines was required.

=== Men ===
The results of the ten most successful athletes of the Combined World Cup 2015:

Rank	Name	Points
1	(Czech Republic) Adam Ondra	674.00
2	(Canada) Sean McColl	486.00
3	(Slovenia) Domen Škofic	407.00
4	(Austria) Jakob Schubert	405.00
5	(Germany) Jan Hojer	295.00
6	(Japan) Minoru Nakano	279.00
7	(China) ZiDa Ma	44.00
8	(South Korea) Sungjoon Chae	35.00
9	(Japan) Naoto Hakamada	28.00
10	(China) HaiBin Qu	22.00

=== Women ===
The results of the ten most successful athletes of the Combined World Cup 2015:

Rank	Name	Points
1	(South Korea) Jain Kim	432.00
2	(Japan) Akiyo Noguchi	421.00
3	(Japan) Yuka Kobayashi	286.00
4	(Japan) Risa Ota	215.00
5	(Japan) Aya Onoe	212.00
6	(Kazakhstan) Tamara Ulzhabayeva	92.00
7	(France) Charlotte Durif	79.00
8	(Japan) Aika Tajima	65.00
9	(China) ZhuoMa PUBU	42.00
10	(Norway) Tina Johnsen Hafsaas	30.00
