= Sport climbing at the Summer Olympics =

- IOC Code: CLB
- Governing body: IFSC
- Events: 6 (men: 3; women: 3)

Summer Olympics
- 1896; 1900; 1904; 1908; 1912; 1920; 1924; 1928; 1932; 1936; 1948; 1952; 1956; 1960; 1964; 1968; 1972; 1976; 1980; 1984; 1988; 1992; 1996; 2000; 2004; 2008; 2012; 2016; 2020; 2024; 2028; 2032
- Medalists

Competition climbing has been held at two editions of the Summer Olympic Games. First selected as one of the discretionary sports at the 2020 and 2024 games, sport climbing will be inducted as one of the mandatory sports at the 2028 games. Athletes compete in the disciplines of bouldering, lead climbing, and speed climbing. All three were contested as a single event in the 2020 programme, while speed climbing was spun off into its own event in the 2024 programme. Slovenia have won the most gold medals (2), while Austria, Japan, and the United States have won the most medals overall (3 each).

== Bid for inclusion ==
The inclusion was proposed by the International Federation of Sport Climbing (IFSC) in 2015. In September 2015, competition climbing was included in a shortlist along with baseball, softball, skateboarding, surfing, and karate to be considered for inclusion in the 2020 Summer Olympics; and in June 2016, the executive board of the International Olympic Committee (IOC) announced that they would support the proposal to include all of the shortlisted sports in the 2020 Games. Finally, on August 3, 2016, all five sports (counting baseball and softball together as one sport) were approved for inclusion in the 2020 Olympic program.

== Competition format ==
At the 2020 Summer Olympics, two climbing events were contested: men's combined and women's combined. The competition format combined three disciplines of competition climbing: competition speed climbing, competition bouldering, and competition lead climbing. This decision caused widespread criticism in the climbing community.

Members of the IFSC explained that they were only granted one gold medal per gender by the Olympic committee, and they did not want to exclude speed climbing. The IFSC's goal for the 2020 Olympics was primarily to establish climbing and its three disciplines as Olympic sports; changes to the format could follow later. This tactic proved to be successful; the 2024 Summer Olympics would expand sport climbing to separate boulder-and-lead and speed climbing events.

Beginning at the 2028 Summer Olympics, the boulder and lead disciplines will be split into separate medal events.

== Technical information ==
For Olympic level sports climbing, route setters are instructed to set lead climbs at a grade of between 8c (5.14b) and 9a (5.14d) for both the men's and women's events. For boulder, men's routes are set between a grade of V10 (7C+) and V14 (8B+), and women's routes between V9 (7C) and V12 (8A+).

NB:

- Lead grades are given in French Numerical and grades in brackets () are in American YDS.
- Boulder grade are given in V-Grades and grades in brackets () are in Fb-Grades.
- Due to the climbing routes being at the highest level, routes cannot be sufficiently tested, therefore the exact grade of each route is unknown, and may not reflect the target range.

== Summary ==
Games	Events	Best nations
2020 Summer Olympics	2	Spain (1); Slovenia (1)
2024 Summer Olympics	4	Poland (1)
2028 Summer Olympics	6	

== Events ==
Current program
Event	2020	2024	2028	Years
Men's combined (s, b, l)	X			1
Men's combined (b, l)		X		1
Men's lead			X	1
Men's boulder			X	1
Men's speed		X	X	2
Women's combined (s, b, l)	X			1
Women's combined (b, l)		X		1
Women's lead			X	1
Women's boulder			X	1
Women's speed		X	X	2
Events	2	4	6	

== Participating nations ==
The following nations have taken part in the Olympic climbing competition. The numbers in the table indicate the number of competitors sent to that year's Olympics.

Nation	2020	2024	2028	Years
Australia	2	2		2
Austria	2	2		2
Belgium	–	1		1
Canada	2	–		1
China	2	7		2
Czech Republic	1	1		2
France	4	7		2
Germany	2	3		2
Great Britain	1	4		2
Indonesia	–	4		1
Iran	–	1		1
Italy	3	4		2
Japan	4	4		2
Kazakhstan	1	1		2
New Zealand	–	2		1
Poland	1	2		2
ROC	3	–		1
Slovenia	2	3		2
South Africa	2	4		2
South Korea	2	3		2
Spain	1	2		2
Switzerland	1	1		2
Ukraine	–	2		1
United States	4	8		2
Nations	19	22		24
Climbers	40	68		
Year	2020	2024	2028	3

== Olympic records history ==
Event	Round	Climber	Nation	Time	Games	Date	Record
Men's combined (speed)	Qualification	Bassa Mawem	France	5.45	2020 Tokyo	3 August 2021	OR
Women's combined (speed)	Qualification	Aleksandra Mirosław	Poland	6.97	2020 Tokyo	4 August 2021	OR
Women's combined (speed)	Final	Aleksandra Mirosław	Poland	6.84	2020 Tokyo	6 August 2021	WR
Women's speed	Qualification	Aleksandra Mirosław	Poland	6.06	2024 Paris	5 August 2024	WR
Men's speed	Bronze medal match	Sam Watson	United States	4.74	2024 Paris	8 August 2024	WR

== Medal table ==
As of the women's combined event of 2024 Olympics

Rank	Nation	Gold	Silver	Bronze	Total
1	Slovenia	2	0	0	2
2	Poland	1	0	1	2
3	Great Britain	1	0	0	1
3	Indonesia	1	0	0	1
3	Spain	1	0	0	1
6	Japan	0	2	1	3
6	United States	0	2	1	3
8	China	0	2	0	2
9	Austria	0	0	3	3
Totals (9 entries)		6	6	6	18

== Current program ==
=== Men's Combined ===
Games	Gold	Silver	Bronze
2020 Tokyo	Alberto Ginés López; Spain	Nathaniel Coleman; United States	Jakob Schubert; Austria
2024 Paris	Toby Roberts; Great Britain	Sorato Anraku; Japan	Jakob Schubert; Austria

Medals
Rank	Nation	Gold	Silver	Bronze	Total
1	Great Britain	1	0	0	1
1	Spain	1	0	0	1
2	Japan	0	1	0	1
2	United States	0	1	0	1
3	Austria	0	0	2	2
Total	5 nations	2	2	2	6

=== Men's lead ===
Games	Gold	Silver	Bronze
2028 Los Angeles			

Medals
Rank	Nation	Gold	Silver	Bronze	Total
Total	0 nations	0	0	0	0

=== Men's boulder ===
Games	Gold	Silver	Bronze
2028 Los Angeles			

Medals
Rank	Nation	Gold	Silver	Bronze	Total
Total	0 nations	0	0	0	0

=== Men's speed ===
Games	Gold	Silver	Bronze
2024 Paris	Veddriq Leonardo; Indonesia	Wu Peng; China	Sam Watson; United States
2028 Los Angeles			

Medals
Rank	Nation	Gold	Silver	Bronze	Total
1	Indonesia	1	0	0	1
2	China	0	1	0	1
3	United States	0	0	1	1
Total	3 nations	1	1	1	3

=== Women's combined ===
Games	Gold	Silver	Bronze
2020 Tokyo	Janja Garnbret; Slovenia	Miho Nonaka; Japan	Akiyo Noguchi; Japan
2024 Paris	Janja Garnbret; Slovenia	Brooke Raboutou; United States	Jessica Pilz; Austria

Medals
Rank	Nation	Gold	Silver	Bronze	Total
1	Slovenia	2	0	0	2
2	Japan	0	1	1	2
3	United States	0	1	0	1
4	Austria	0	0	1	1
Total	4 nations	2	2	2	6

=== Women's lead ===
Games	Gold	Silver	Bronze
2028 Los Angeles			

Medals
Rank	Nation	Gold	Silver	Bronze	Total
Total	0 nations	0	0	0	0

=== Women's boulder ===
Games	Gold	Silver	Bronze
2028 Los Angeles			

Medals
Rank	Nation	Gold	Silver	Bronze	Total
Total	0 nations	0	0	0	0

=== Women’s speed ===
Games	Gold	Silver	Bronze
2024 Paris	Aleksandra Mirosław; Poland	Deng Lijuan; China	Aleksandra Kałucka; Poland
2028 Los Angeles			

Medals
Rank	Nation	Gold	Silver	Bronze	Total
1	Poland	1	0	1	2
2	China	0	1	0	1
Total	2 nations	1	1	1	3

== See also ==
- IFSC Climbing World Championships
- IFSC Climbing World Cup
