= Sport climbing at the 2020 Summer Olympics =

Competition climbing at the Games of the XXXII Olympiad
- Venue: Aomi Urban Sports Park, Tokyo
- Dates: 3–6 August 2021
- No. of events: 2
- Competitors: 40 from 19 nations

Competition climbing made its Olympic debut at the 2020 Summer Olympics in Tokyo, Japan (postponed to 2021 due to the COVID-19 pandemic). Two events were held, one each for men and women. The format controversially consisted of one combined event with three disciplines: lead climbing, speed climbing and bouldering. The medals were determined based on best performance across all three disciplines. This format was previously tested at the 2018 Summer Youth Olympics. The Olympic code for sports climbing is CLB.

Two qualification boulders were leaked on YouTube; the video was quickly taken down and the boulders were reset.

== Format ==
On August 3, 2016, the International Olympic Committee (IOC) formally announced that competition climbing would be a medal sport in the 2020 Summer Olympics. The inclusion was proposed by the International Federation of Sport Climbing (IFSC) in 2015.

The decision to combine three disciplines of lead climbing, bouldering, and speed climbing with one set of medals per sex caused widespread criticism in the climbing world.

Climber Lynn Hill said the decision to include speed climbing was like "asking a middle-distance runner to compete in the sprint." Czech climber Adam Ondra, who later competed as a finalist at the Olympics, voiced similar sentiments in an interview stating that anything would be better than this combination. There is some overlap between athletes in the categories of lead climbing and bouldering, but speed climbing is usually seen as a separate discipline which is practiced by specialized athletes. Climber Shauna Coxsey stated, "No boulderer has transitioned to speed and lead, and no speed climber has done it to bouldering and lead."

Members of the IFSC explained that they were only granted one gold medal per gender by the Olympic committee and they did not want to exclude speed climbing. The IFSC's goal for the 2020 Olympics was primarily to establish climbing and its three disciplines as Olympic sports; changes to the format could follow later. This tactic proved to be successful as they were granted a second set of medals for the 2024 Summer Olympics, where speed climbing was a separate event from the combined event of lead climbing and bouldering.

The final rankings were calculated by multiplying the climbers' rankings in each discipline, with the best score being the lowest one.

== Qualification ==
There were 40 quota spots available for competition climbing. Each National Olympic Committee could obtain a maximum of 2 spots in each event (total 4 maximum across the 2 events). Each event had 20 competitors qualify: 18 from qualification, 1 from the host (Japan), and 1 from Tripartite Commission invitations.

The 2019 IFSC Climbing World Championships served as one qualification event with 7 spots per gender being awarded to the top finishers of the combined event.

== Schedule ==
The schedule for the events was as follows.

Date	Aug 3			Aug 4			Aug 5			Aug 6		
Men's	S Qualification: Speed climbing	B Qualification: Bouldering	L Qualification: Lead climbing				S Finals: Speed climbing	B Finals: Bouldering	L Finals: Lead climbing			
Women's				S Qualification: Speed climbing	B Qualification: Bouldering	L Qualification: Lead climbing				S Finals: Speed climbing	B Finals: Bouldering	L Finals: Lead climbing
S = Speed, B = Bouldering, L = Lead

Q	Qualification	F	Finals

== Participating nations ==
40 climbers from 19 nations qualified. Qualification events included the 2019 IFSC Climbing World Championships, Olympic Qualifying Event, and continental championships.

- Australia (2)
- Austria (2)
- Canada (2)
- China (2)
- Czech Republic (1)
- France (4)
- Germany (2)
- Great Britain (1)
- Italy (3)
- Japan (4) Host
- Kazakhstan (1)
- Poland (1)
- ROC (3)
- Slovenia (2)
- South Africa (2)
- South Korea (2)
- Spain (1)
- Switzerland (1)
- United States (4)

== Medal summary ==
=== Medal table ===
* Host nation (Japan)

Rank	NOC	Gold	Silver	Bronze	Total
1	Slovenia	1	0	0	1
1	Spain	1	0	0	1
3	Japan*	0	1	1	2
4	United States	0	1	0	1
5	Austria	0	0	1	1
Totals (5 entries)		2	2	2	6

=== Medalists ===
Event	Gold	Silver	Bronze
Men's combined	Alberto Ginés López; Spain	Nathaniel Coleman; United States	Jakob Schubert; Austria
Women's combined	Janja Garnbret; Slovenia	Miho Nonaka; Japan	Akiyo Noguchi; Japan

== Records broken ==
Event	Round	Climber	Nation	Time	Date	Record
Men's combined (speed)	Qualification	Bassa Mawem	France	5.45	3 August	OR
Women's combined (speed)	Qualification	Aleksandra Mirosław	Poland	6.97	4 August	OR
Women's combined (speed)	Final	Aleksandra Mirosław	Poland	6.84	6 August	WR

== See also ==
- Sport climbing at the 2018 Summer Youth Olympics
- 2019 IFSC Climbing World Championships
