= Bouldering at the 2015 IFSC Climbing World Cup =

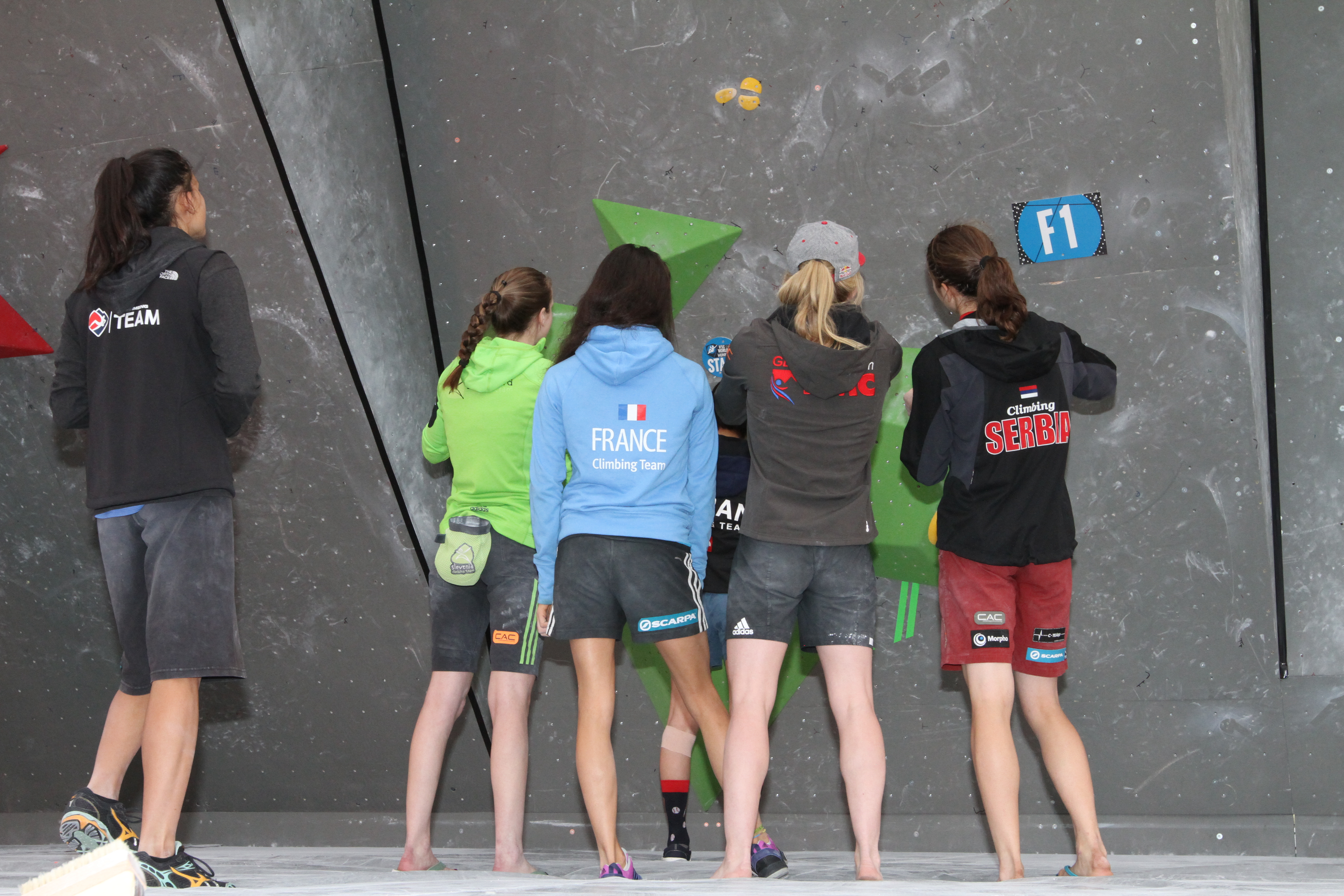
- Climbers inspecting the routes.
- Location: Toronto, Canada Vail, United States; Chongqing, China; Haiyang, China Munich, Germany

Champions
- Men: (South Korea) Jongwon Chon
- Women: (Japan) Akiyo Noguchi

The bouldering events at the 2015 IFSC Climbing World Cup took place in various countries between May and August of that year. The winners were awarded trophies, the best three finishers received medals, and prize money was awarded to the top six finishers at each stop. At the end of the season an overall ranking was determined based upon points, which athletes were awarded for finishing in the top 30 of each individual event. Akiyo Noguchi won the overall women's World Cup and Jongwon Chon won the overall men's World Cup.

== Toronto, Canada (30–31 May) ==
=== Women ===
59 athletes attended the World Cup in Toronto. Anna Stöhr won the competition.

Rank	Name	Score
1	(Austria) Anna Stöhr	3t6 4b5
2	(Japan) Akiyo Noguchi	3t7 4b7
3	(Germany) Juliane Wurm	2t2 4b5
4	(United States) Alex Puccio	2t3 3b3
5	(Austria) Katharina Saurwein	0t 3b10
6	(France) Mélissa Le Nevé	0t 2b2

=== Men ===
73 athletes attended the World Cup in Toronto. Alban Levier won the competition.

Rank	Name	Score
1	(France) Alban Levier	3t6 4b5
2	(United States) Nathaniel Coleman	3t9 4b8
3	(Czech Republic) Adam Ondra	2t3 3b3
4	(Japan) Kokoro Fujii	2t4 3b3
5	(France) Manuel Cornu	1t1 3b3
6	(South Korea) Jongwon Chon	1t3 2b3
7	(France) Jeremy Bonder	0t 2b4

== Vail, USA (5–6 June) ==
=== Women ===
52 athletes attended the World Cup in Vail. Megan Mascarenas won the competition.

Rank	Name	Score
1	(United States) Megan Mascarenas	3t4 4b5
2	(Japan) Akiyo Noguchi	2t4 3b6
3	(United Kingdom) Shauna Coxsey	2t4 3b7
4	(Japan) Miho Nonaka	1t1 2b2
5	(Austria) Anna Stöhr	1t2 2b5
6	(United States) Margo Hayes	1t4 2b5

=== Men ===
76 athletes attended the World Cup in Vail. Jan Hojer won the competition.

Rank	Name	Score
1	(Germany) Jan Hojer	3t4 4b4
2	(United States) Nathaniel Coleman	3t4 4b6
3	(Czech Republic) Adam Ondra	3t12 4b12
4	(Russia) Dmitrii Sharafutdinov	2t3 4b7
5	(Canada) Sean McColl	2t3 3b4
6	(Japan) Kokoro Fujii	2t7 4b14
7	(Canada) Jason Holowach	1t2 4b12

== Chongqing, China (20–21 June) ==
=== Women ===
32 athletes attended the World Cup in Chongqing. Akiyo Noguchi won the competition.

Rank	Name	Score
1	(Japan) Akiyo Noguchi	4t5 4b5
2	(Japan) Miho Nonaka	3t5 4b4
3	(United Kingdom) Shauna Coxsey	3t6 3b5
4	(Japan) Aya Onoe	2t2 4b5
5	(Germany) Monika Retschy	2t2 4b7
6	(South Korea) Sol Sa	2t10 4b9

=== Men ===
56 athletes attended the World Cup in Chongqing. Sean McColl won the competition.

Rank	Name	Score
1	(Canada) Sean McColl	4t12 4b9
2	(South Korea) Jongwon Chon	3t5 3b3
3	(Japan) Tsukuru Hori	3t8 3b8
4	(Germany) Jan Hojer	3t9 4b7
5	(France) Jeremy Bonder	2t5 3b4
6	(Poland) Andrzej Mecherzynski-Wiktor	1t1 4b5
7	(Russia) Rustam Gelmanov	1t1 2b3

== Haiyang, China (26–27 June) ==
=== Women ===
31 athletes attended the World Cup in Haiyang. Petra Klingler won the competition.

Rank	Name	Score
1	(Switzerland) Petra Klingler	3t3 4b10
2	(Japan) Akiyo Noguchi	3t4 4b5
3	(United Kingdom) Shauna Coxsey	3t8 4b9
4	(Japan) Miho Nonaka	2t4 4b11
5	(Austria) Katharina Saurwein	1t1 2b4
6	(France) Mélissa Le Nevé	1t3 3b7

=== Men ===
53 athletes attended the World Cup in Haiyang. Jongwon Chon won the competition.

Rank	Name	Score
1	(South Korea) Jongwon Chon	2t3 2b2
2	(Russia) Rustam Gelmanov	2t7 2b6
3	(France) Alban Levier	1t1 2b2
4	(Germany) Jan Hojer	1t1 2b3
5	(Czech Republic) Adam Ondra	1t1 2b5
6	(Japan) Minoru Nakano	0t 3b4

== Munich, Germany (14–15 August) ==
=== Women ===
86 athletes attended the World Cup in Munich. Shauna Coxsey won the competition.

Rank	Name	Score
1	(United Kingdom) Shauna Coxsey	4t4 4b4
2	(France) Fanny Gibert	3t3 4b7
3	(United States) Megan Mascarenas	3t4 4b5
4	(Japan) Akiyo Noguchi	2t3 4b6
5	(Serbia) Staša Gejo	1t2 3b3
6	(Slovenia) Katja Kadic	1t3 3b4

=== Men ===
125 athletes attended the World Cup in Munich. Alexey Rubtsov won the competition.

Rank	Name	Score
1	(Russia) Alexey Rubtsov	2t11 4b12
2	(Czech Republic) Martin Stráník	1t1 3b4
3	(South Korea) Jongwon Chon	1t1 3b5
4	(Ukraine) Sergii Topishko	0t 2b2
5	(Germany) Jan Hojer	0t 2b3
6	(Russia) Rustam Gelmanov	0t 2b6

== Overall Ranking ==
=== Women ===
5 best competition results were counted for IFSC Climbing Worldcup 2015. Akiyo Noguchi won.

Rank	Name	Points
1	(Japan) Akiyo Noguchi	395
2	(United Kingdom) Shauna Coxsey	332
3	(Japan) Miho Nonaka	276
4	(Switzerland) Petra Klingler	224
5	(United States) Megan Mascarenas	165
6	(Austria) Katharina Saurwein	163
7	(South Korea) Sol Sa	158
8	(France) Fanny Gibert	151
9	(Austria) Anna Stöhr	151
10	(France) Mélissa Le Nevé	150

=== Men ===
5 best competition results were counted for IFSC Climbing Worldcup 2015. Jongwon Chon won.

Rank	Name	Points
1	(South Korea) Jongwon Chon	292
2	(Germany) Jan Hojer	264
3	(Czech Republic) Adam Ondra	259
4	(United States) Nathaniel Coleman	238
5	(France) Alban Levier	202
6	(Russia) Rustam Gelmanov	179
7	(Japan) Kokoro Fujii	173
8	(Canada) Sean McColl	169
9	(Japan) Rei Sugimoto	151
9	(France) Jeremy Bonder	146

=== National Team Ranking ===
For National Team Ranking, 3 best results per competition and category were counted. Japan won.

Rank	Nation	Points
1	Japan	1352
2	France	855
3	United States	670
4	Germany	567
5	Austria	542
6	(South Korea) Republic of Korea	511
7	(United Kingdom) Great Britain	433
8	(Russia) Russian Federation	433
9	Czech Republic	365
10	Slovenia	329
