= Sport climbing at the 2020 Summer Olympics – Women's combined =

Women's combined events at the Olympics

Women's combined at the Games of the XXXII Olympiad
- Olympic sport climbing
- Venue: Aomi Urban Sports Park, Tokyo
- Dates: 4 August 2021 (qualification); 6 August 2021 (final)
- Competitors: 20 from 15 nations

Medalists
1st place, gold medalist(s)		Janja Garnbret	Slovenia
2nd place, silver medalist(s)		Miho Nonaka	Japan
3rd place, bronze medalist(s)		Akiyo Noguchi	Japan

The women's combined event at the 2020 Summer Olympics was a climbing competition combining three disciplines (speed, bouldering, lead). It took place between 4 and 6 August 2021 at the Aomi Urban Sports Park in Tokyo. 20 athletes from 15 nations competed. Sport climbing was one of four new sports added to the Olympic program for 2020.

The medals for the competition were presented by Ivo Ferriani, IOC Executive Member, Italy, Olympian; and the medalists' bouquets were presented by Marco Maria Scolaris, IFSC President; Italy.

== Competition format ==
In the qualification round each of the twenty competitors competed in speed climbing, bouldering and lead climbing. The scores were multiplied and the 8 competitors with the lowest total scores proceeded to the finals.

In speed climbing, climbers raced against each others in pairs on a standardized wall of 15m in height. In the qualification round, climbers had two runs on two different lanes; their best times were recorded and used for seeding placement in the Finals. In the final round, climbers raced head-to-head with the fastest winning.

In bouldering, climbers needed to top boulder problems set on 4.5m-high wall within a certain amount of time. In the qualification round, climbers were faced with 4 boulder problems and given 5 minutes on each problem to top them. The final round had 3 boulder problems to top within a 4 minutes time limit.

In lead climbing, climbers were given a route set on 15m-high wall to top within 6 minutes. If there was a tie, the climber with the fastest elapsed time won.

=== Route-setting ===
Speed climbing wall is standardized: 15 meters tall, 5 degrees overhanging. Bouldering and lead climbing have route-setting teams.

The bouldering route-setters were Percy Bishton (chief) from the United Kingdom, Manuel Hassler from Switzerland, Romain Cabessut from France and Garrett Gregor from the United States.

The lead route-setters were Adam Pustelnik (chief) from Poland, Jan Zbranek from Czech Republic, Hiroshi Okano and Akito Matsushima from Japan.

== Records ==
Prior to this competition, the existing world and Olympic records were as follows.

Speed records
World record	Iuliia Kaplina (RUS)	6.964	Moscow, Russia	21 November 2020
Olympic record	Not established	–	–	–

The following records were established during the competition:

Date	Round	Climber	Nation	Time	Record
August 4	Speed Qualification	Aleksandra Mirosław	Poland	6.97	OR
August 6	Speed Final	Aleksandra Mirosław	Poland	6.84	WR

== Schedule ==
All times are Japan Standard Time (UTC+9)

Date	Time	Round
Wednesday, 4 August 2021	17:00	Speed Qualification
Wednesday, 4 August 2021	18:00	Bouldering Qualification
Wednesday, 4 August 2021	21:10	Lead Qualification
Friday, 6 August 2021	17:30	Speed Final
Friday, 6 August 2021	18:30	Bouldering Final
Friday, 6 August 2021	21:10	Lead Final

== Results ==
=== Qualification ===
The top 8 climbers of 20 advanced to the finals.

Rank	Climber	Nation	Speed			Bouldering						Lead			Total	Notes
Rank	Climber	Nation	A	B	CP	1	2	3	4	Results	CP	HR	TFT	CP	Total	Notes
1	Janja Garnbret	Slovenia	9.44	~~10.32~~	14	T1z1	T1z1	T1z1	T1z1	4T4z 4 4	1	30		4	56.00	Q
2	Seo Chae-hyun	South Korea	10.01	~~11.74~~	17	T3z1	T2z2	z1	z1	2T4z 5 5	5	40+		1	85.00	Q
3	Miho Nonaka	Japan	7.55	~~7.74~~	4	T2z1	z1	z1	–	1T3z 2 3	8	30+		3	96.00	Q
4	Akiyo Noguchi	Japan	~~8.27~~	8.23	9	T2z1	z1	T2z1	T1z1	3T4z 5 4	3	27+		6	162.00	Q
5	Brooke Raboutou	United States	8.67	~~8.81~~	12	T2z1	T1z1	z1	T1z1	3T4z 4 4	2	26+	3:40	8	192.00	Q
6	Jessica Pilz	Austria	8.51	~~8.63~~	11	T3z1	z3	z1	–	1T3z 3 5	9	33+		2	198.00	Q
7	Aleksandra Mirosław	Poland	6.97 OR	~~7.01~~	1	–	–	–	–	0T0z 0 0	20	12		19	380.00	Q
8	Anouck Jaubert	France	7.12	~~7.29~~	2	T4z1	–	–	–	1T1z 4 1	13	16+	2:14	15	390.00	Q
9	Viktoria Meshkova	ROC	9.54	~~9.73~~	15	T6z1	T2z2	z1	z1	2T4z 8 5	6	29+		5	450.00	
10	Shauna Coxsey	Great Britain	9.65	~~10.07~~	16	T2z1	T1z1	z1	z1	2T4z 3 4	4	21+	2:23	13	832.00	
11	Kyra Condie	United States	~~8.12~~	8.08	7	T4z1	–	z1	z3	1T3z 4 5	11	22+		11	847.00	
12	Song Yiling	China	~~8.74~~	7.46	3	z5	–	–	–	0T1z 0 5	19	13+		18	1026.00	
13	Julia Chanourdie	France	~~8.43~~	8.17	8	z1	z7	z1	–	0T3z 0 9	15	25+		9	1080.00	
14	Alannah Yip	Canada	~~8.17~~	7.99	6	z1	–	z1	–	0T2z 0 2	16	21+	2:14	12	1152.00	
15	Laura Rogora	Italy	10.50	~~Fall~~	19	z1	z2	T1z1	z1	1T4z 1 5	7	25		10	1330.00	
16	Petra Klingler	Switzerland	8.42	~~8.67~~	10	T3z1	z3	z4	–	1T3z 3 8	10	16+	1:49	14	1400.00	
17	Iuliia Kaplina	ROC	7.65	~~Fall~~	5	z2	–	–	–	0T1z 0 2	18	14+		17	1530.00	
18	Mia Krampl	Slovenia	~~10.44~~	10.43	18	z1	z1	z1	z2	0T4z 0 5	14	26+	3:16	7	1764.00	
19	Oceana Mackenzie	Australia	8.83	~~9.38~~	13	T3z1	–	z1	–	1T2z 3 2	12	15+		16	2496.00	
20	Erin Sterkenburg	South Africa	~~Fall~~	11.10	20	z1	–	–	–	0T1z 0 1	17	7+		20	6800.00	

=== Final ===
Rank	Climber	Nation	Speed							Bouldering					Lead		Total
Rank	Climber	Nation	Quarterfinals		Semifinals		Finals		CP	1	2	3	Results	CP	HR	CP	Total
Rank	Climber	Nation	R	T	R	T	R	T	CP	1	2	3	Results	CP	HR	CP	Total
1st place, gold medalist(s)	Janja Garnbret	Slovenia	3	8.49	6	8.67	10	7.81	5	T4z1	T1z1	z1	2T3z 5 3	1	37+	1	5
2nd place, silver medalist(s)	Miho Nonaka	Japan	4	8.19	8	7.76	11	7.99	3	–	z4	z1	0T2z 0 5	3	21	5	45
3rd place, bronze medalist(s)	Akiyo Noguchi	Japan	2	8.55	7	Fall	11	8.42	4	z5	z2	–	0T2z 0 7	4	29+	4	64
4	Aleksandra Mirosław	Poland	1	7.49	7	7.03	12	6.84 WR	1	–	–	–	0T0z 0 0	8	9+	8	64
5	Brooke Raboutou	United States	4	Fall	6	8.77	9	9.06	7	z5	z3	z2	0T3z 0 10	2	20+	6	84
6	Anouck Jaubert	France	3	7.40	8	7.51	12	8.84	2	z2	–	–	0T1z 0 2	6	13+	7	84
7	Jessica Pilz	Austria	2	8.89	5	8.77	10	8.43	6	z7	z3	–	0T2z 0 10	5	34+	3	90
8	Seo Chae-hyun	South Korea	1	10.64	5	12.85	9	9.85	8	–	–	–	0T0z 0 0	7	35+	2	112
