= Sport climbing at the 2017 World Games – Women's speed =

Sport climbing – Women's speed at the 2017 World Games
- Venue: Nowy Targ Square, Wrocław, Poland
- Dates: 22 July
- Competitors: 12 from 5 nations

Medalists
gold medal	Iuliia Kaplina	Russia
silver medal	Anouck Jaubert	France
bronze medal	Anna Tsyganova	Russia

The women's speed competition in sport climbing at the 2017 World Games took place on 22 July 2017 at the Nowy Targ Square in Wrocław, Poland.

== Competition format ==
A total of 12 athletes entered the competition. In qualification every athlete has 2 runs, best time counts. Top 8 climbers qualify to main competition.

== Results ==
=== Qualifications ===
Rank	Athlete	Nation	Time 1	Time 2	Best of	Note
1	Anouck Jaubert	France	5.59	5.60	5.59	Q
2	Iuliia Kaplina	Russia	5.64	5,75	5.64	Q
3	Anna Tsyganova	Russia	6.09	5.84	5.84	Q
4	Mariia Krasavina	Russia	5.90	6.04	5.90	Q
5	Aleksandra Rudzińska	Poland	7.17	5.96	5.96	Q
6	Anna Brożek	Poland	6.04	6.08	6.04	Q
7	Daria Kan	Russia	7.00	6.09	6.09	Q
8	Patrycja Chudziak	Poland	7.72	6.10	6.10	Q
9	He Cuilian	China	DNF	6.41	6.41	
10	Andrea Rojas	Ecuador	6.66	6.55	6.55	
11	Elma Fleuret	France	6.58	8.34	6.58	
12	Klaudia Buczek	Poland	6.93	DNF	6.93	

=== Competition bracket ===
Quarter-finals
1	(France) Anouck Jaubert	7.89
8	(Poland) Patrycja Chudziak	DNF
4	(Russia) Mariia Krasavina	7.95
5	(Poland) Aleksandra Rudzińska	8.04
2	(Russia) Iuliia Kaplina	8.30
7	(Russia) Daria Kan	8.40
3	(Russia) Anna Tsyganova	7.99
6	(Poland) Anna Brożek	9.40

Semi-finals
1	(France) Anouck Jaubert	7.52
4	(Russia) Mariia Krasavina	7.69
2	(Russia) Iuliia Kaplina	8.03
3	(Russia) Anna Tsyganova	9.00

Finals
1	(France) Anouck Jaubert	7.42
2	(Russia) Iuliia Kaplina	7.32
Third place
4	(Russia) Mariia Krasavina	9.08
3	(Russia) Anna Tsyganova	7.79
