= University of Lublin =

Universities in Lublin, Poland:

- Maria Curie-Skłodowska University
- John Paul II Catholic University of Lublin
- Lublin University of Technology
- Medical University of Lublin
