= No One Mourns the Wicked (climb) =

Bouldering route in Colorado

- Location within Colorado
- Location: South Platte, Colorado, United States
- Coordinates: 39°06′41″N 105°13′31″W
- Climbing area: Thunder Ridge
- Route type: Bouldering
- Rock type: Granite
- Technical grade: 8C+ (V16)
- Route setter: Daniel Woods
- First free ascent: Nathaniel Coleman, 3 December 2024

No One Mourns the Wicked is an 8C+ (V16) graded bouldering problem at the granite climbing area of Thunder Ridge in the South Platte region of Colorado. It was first climbed by American Nathaniel Coleman on 3 December 2024 who proposed a grade of 9A (V17). It was repeated by Hamish McArthur on 4 May 2025 in a single session, marking the first time a 9A boulder was completed in a day. German climber Yannick Flohé downgraded the boulder to a 8C+ (V16) problem in April 2026.

== History ==
The sit-start to Daniel Woods' famous 2013 8B+ (V14) graded bouldering route, Defying Gravity, was a longstanding project within the American bouldering community, and part of Woods' original vision. The route's name, as with Defying Gravity, comes from a song in the Broadway musical Wicked.

Coleman began working on the problem after completing the fourth ascent of Defying Gravity on 18 November 2023, following eight sessions. He then spent 14 additional sessions on No One Mourns the Wicked, completing it on 3 December 2024. The ascent was documented by filmmaker Ben Neilson for Mellow Climbing, with the film released on 1 January 2025.

On 4 May 2025, Hamish McArthur made the first repeat of the problem, completing it in a single session. McArthur arrived at the boulder at noon, sent Defying Gravity within two hours, and completed the full problem by 2:47 PM. This marked the first time a potential 9A (V17) graded boulder had been completed in a single day. McArthur had previously climbed the 9A (V17) graded Megatron one month earlier, giving him some experience to confirm Coleman's proposed rating. When asked about the crux in an interview, McArthur stated "I don’t think a move has ever been better suited to me". German climber Yannick Flohé made the fourth ascent of the route in April 2026 and suggested the grade of 8C+ (V16).

== Route ==
The route is a sit-start extension to the existing Defying Gravity 8C (V15) boulder. The full problem consists of 21 hand moves: a nine-move low start section graded approximately 8B (V13), followed by the 12-move Defying Gravity sequence. The climb is located on a steep face at Thunder Ridge, with low-friction rails and crimps, and involves multiple hard dynos. The crux is the starting move of Defying Gravity, which Gripped magazine called "one of the single hardest starting moves of any problem anywhere", performed after nine moves of difficult climbing.

== Ascents ==
No One Mourns the Wicked has been ascended by:

- 1st. Nathaniel Coleman on 3 December 2024.
- 2nd. Hamish McArthur on 4 May 2025.
- 3rd. Becket Hsin, February 2026.
- 4th. Yannick Flohé, April 2026.

== See also ==
- Burden of Dreams, the first-ever 9A graded boulder in the world
- Return of the Sleepwalker, the first 9A graded boulder in the US, by Daniel Woods
- Megatron, the second 9A graded boulder in the US, by Shawn Raboutou
