= Hamish McArthur =

British sport climber

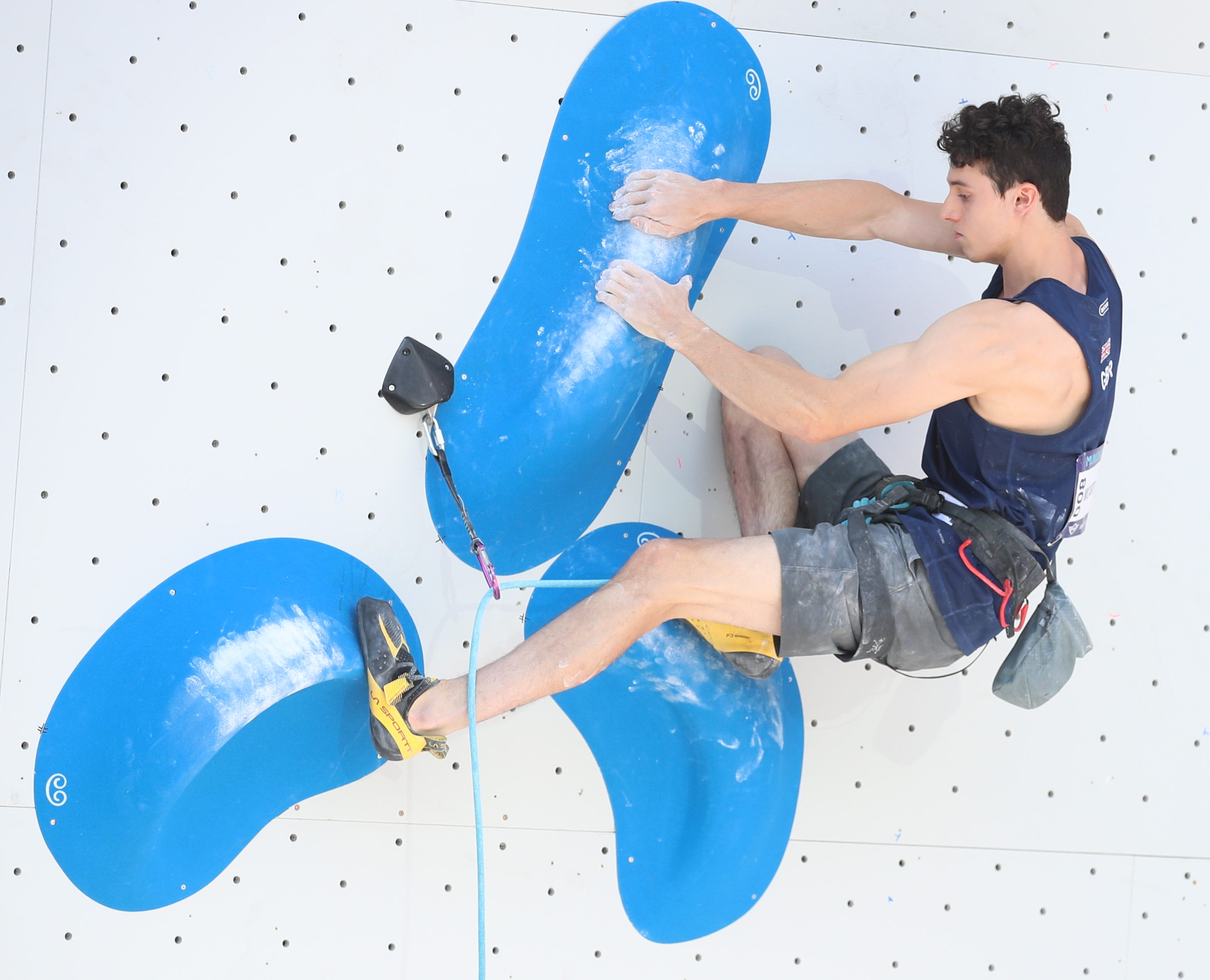
- McArthur at the 2022 European Championships

Personal information
- Full name: Hamish William McArthur
- Born: 6 March 2002 (age 24) York, Yorkshire, England
- Occupation: Rock climber
- Height: 182 cm (6 ft 0 in)

Climbing career
- Type of climber: Competition climbing; Sport climbing; Bouldering
- Highest grade: Redpoint: 9a (5.14d); Bouldering: 9A (V17)
Medal record
Men's competition climbing
Representing Great Britain
World Championships
Bronze medal – third place	2021 Moscow	Lead
World Youth Championships
Gold medal – first place	2021	Boulder Juniors
Silver medal – second place	2019	Boulder Youth A
Silver medal – second place	2021	Combined Juniors
Gold medal – first place	2021	Lead Juniors
European Youth Cup
Bronze medal – third place	2019	Lead Youth A

Hamish William McArthur (born 6 March 2002) is an English professional rock climber and former competition climber, who specialised in competition bouldering and competition lead climbing events.

In September 2021, he finished third in his first appearance at the IFSC Climbing World Championships. In June 2024 he secured his place for the Paris 2024 Olympics in the Lead and Bouldering discipline, where he made the final and finished in 5th place.

== Early life ==
McArthur grew up in York, North Yorkshire attending Park Grove Primary School and then Joseph Rowntree School. At the age of 11 he became the youngest member of the Great Britain junior climbing squad. When McArthur was 12 he won the under 14s category at the British Youth Climbing Series Finals in Edinburgh.

== Climbing career ==
=== Competition climbing ===
At junior level, McArthur won the gold medal at the IFSC Junior Boulder World Championship in Voronezh, beating his previous best result of silver at the 2019 IFSC Youth World Championships.

On McArthur's senior debut, he won third place in at the 2021 IFSC Climbing World Championships § Lead in Moscow.

McArthur represented Great Britain in the sport climbing at the Paris Olympics finishing fifth in the Combined Boulder and Lead final.

On 26 March 2026, McArthur announced his retirement from competition climbing.

=== Rock climbing ===
Hamish has made some notable ascents on outdoor sport climbing routes. In December 2019, he redpointed Jungle Speed 9a (5.14d), followed shortly after by A Muerte 8c+ (5.14c); both are located in Siurana.

In March 2021, he flashed Bulbhaul 8A+ (V12), at Almscliffe Crag. This climb was originally given 8B+ but now sits at 8A+.

In 2024, he flashed Fool Me Once 8B+ (V14), in Squamish.

In 2025, he made the second ascent of Megatron V17 (9A), in Colorado, USA.

In 2025, he made the second ascent of No One Mourns the Wicked V17 (9A), in Colorado, USA. This ascent marked the first V17 ever climbed in just one day of effort.
