= Sport climbing at the 2020 Summer Olympics – Men's combined =

Men's combined events at the Olympics

Men's combined at the Games of the XXXII Olympiad
- Olympic sport climbing
- Venue: Aomi Urban Sports Park, Tokyo
- Dates: 3 August 2021 (qualification); 5 August 2021 (final)
- Competitors: 20 from 15 nations
- Winning Score: 28

Medalists
1st place, gold medalist(s)		Alberto Ginés López	Spain
2nd place, silver medalist(s)		Nathaniel Coleman	United States
3rd place, bronze medalist(s)		Jakob Schubert	Austria

The men's combined event at the 2020 Summer Olympics was a climbing competition combining three disciplines (speed, bouldering, lead). It was held from August 3 to August 5, 2021, at the Aomi Urban Sports Park in Tokyo. A total of 20 athletes from 15 nations competed. Sport climbing was one of four new sports added to the Olympic program for 2020.

During the qualifying round, Bassa Mawem of France suffered an injury to his lower bicep tendon in his left arm and was forced to withdraw from the final.

== Competition format ==
In the qualification round each of the twenty competitors competed in speed climbing, bouldering and lead climbing. The scores were multiplied and the 8 competitors with the lowest total scores proceeded to the finals.

In speed climbing, climbers raced against each other's in pairs on a standardized wall of 15m in height. In the qualification round, climbers had two runs on two different lanes; their best times were recorded and used for seeding placement in the Final rounds. In the final round, climbers raced head-to-head with the fastest to the top winning.

In bouldering, climbers needed to top boulder problems set on 4.5m-high wall within a certain amount of time. In the qualification round, climbers were faced with 4 boulder problems and given 5 minutes on each problem to top them. The final round had 3 boulder problems to top within a 4 minutes time limit.

In lead climbing, climbers were given a route set on 15m-high wall to top within 6 minutes. If there was a tie, the climber with the fastest elapsed time won.

=== Route-setting ===
Speed climbing wall is standardized: 15 meters tall, 5 degrees overhanging. Bouldering and lead climbing have route-setting teams.

The bouldering route-setters were Percy Bishton (chief) from the United Kingdom, Manuel Hassler from Switzerland, Romain Cabessut from France and Garrett Gregor from the United States.

The lead route-setters were Adam Pustelnik (chief) from Poland, Jan Zbranek from Czech Republic, Hiroshi Okano and Akito Matsushima from Japan.

== Records ==
Prior to this competition, the existing world and Olympic records were as follows.

Speed records
World record	Veddriq Leonardo (INA)	5.208	Salt Lake City, United States	28 May 2021
Olympic record	Not established	–	–	–

The following records were established during the competition:

Date	Round	Climber	Nation	Time	Record
August 3	Speed Qualification	Bassa Mawem	France	5.45	OR

== Schedule ==
All times are Japan Standard Time (UTC+9)

Date	Time	Round
Tuesday, 3 August 2021	17:00	Speed Qualification
Tuesday, 3 August 2021	18:00	Bouldering Qualification
Tuesday, 3 August 2021	21:10	Lead Qualification
Thursday, 5 August 2021	17:30	Speed Final
Thursday, 5 August 2021	18:30	Bouldering Final
Thursday, 5 August 2021	21:10	Lead Final

== Results ==
=== Qualification ===
The top 8 climbers of 20 advanced to the Finals.

Rank	Climber	Nation	Speed			Bouldering						Lead			Total	Notes
Rank	Climber	Nation	A	B	CP	1	2	3	4	Results	CP	HR	TFT	CP	Total	Notes
1	Mickaël Mawem	France	5.95	~~7.75~~	3	T2z2	T1z1	T1z1	z1	3T4z 4 5	1	28+	2:24	11	33.00	Q
2	Tomoa Narasaki	Japan	~~DNS~~	5.94	2	T2z1	T4z4	z1	z1	2T4z 6 7	2	26+	2:11	14	56.00	Q
3	Colin Duffy	United States	6.23	~~6.85~~	6	T10z6	–	T7z6	–	2T2z 17 12	5	42+	4:44	2	60.00	Q
4	Jakob Schubert	Austria	6.70	~~6.94~~	12	z9	–	z3	T2z1	1T3z 2 13	7	42+	4:02	1	84.00	Q
5	Adam Ondra	Czech Republic	7.46	~~8.16~~	18	T4z4	–	z4	T3z3	2T3z 7 11	3	39+		4	216.00	Q
6	Alberto Ginés López	Spain	~~6.48~~	6.32	7	–	–	T12z4	–	1T1z 12 4	14	41+		3	294.00	Q
7	Bassa Mawem	France	5.45 OR	~~5.67~~	1	z4	–	–	–	0T1z 0 4	18	7		20	360.00	Q
8	Nathaniel Coleman	United States	6.51	~~6.52~~	10	z1	–	T4z3	z2	1T3z 4 6	11	39		5	550.00	Q
9	Alexander Megos	Germany	~~9.89~~	7.47	19	T2z1	z6	z7	z1	1T4z 2 15	6	36+		6	684.00	
10	Chon Jong-won	South Korea	6.21	~~Fall~~	5	z4	–	T3z3	z3	1T3z 3 10	10	26+	2:34	16	800.00	
11	Rishat Khaibullin	Kazakhstan	~~6.90~~	6.19	4	–	–	z3	–	0T1z 0 3	17	28+	3:09	13	884.00	
12	Jan Hojer	Germany	6.63	~~Fall~~	11	z2	–	T3z3	z3	1T3z 3 8	9	29+		9	891.00	
13	Aleksey Rubtsov	ROC	~~8.09~~	7.23	16	T6z3	–	–	T1z1	2T2z 7 4	4	26+	2:29	15	960.00	
14	Pan Yufei	China	~~8.63~~	7.59	20	T2z2	–	z12	z1	1T3z 2 15	8	36		7	1120.00	
15	Michael Piccolruaz	Italy	6.33	~~6.46~~	8	T5z5	–	z2	–	1T2z 5 7	13	28+	2:33	12	1248.00	
16	Christopher Cosser	South Africa	6.48	~~7.55~~	9	z7	–	z8	–	0T2z 0 15	16	29		10	1440.00	
17	Sean McColl	Canada	~~9.18~~	6.93	14	z2	–	z1	–	0T2z 0 3	15	35+		8	1680.00	
18	Kai Harada	Japan	~~Fall~~	7.08	15	T4z1	–	z7	–	1T2z 4 8	12	25+		17	3060.00	
19	Ludovico Fossali	Italy	6.71	~~7.39~~	13	–	–	–	–	0T0z 0 0	19.5	25	2:48	18	4563.00	
20	Tom O'Halloran	Australia	7.34	~~12.20~~	17	–	–	–	–	0T0z 0 0	19.5	25	3:58	19	6298.50	

=== Final ===
Rank	Climber	Nation	Speed							Bouldering					Lead		Total
Rank	Climber	Nation	Quarterfinals		Semifinals		Finals		CP	1	2	3	Results	CP	HR	CP	Total
Rank	Climber	Nation	R	T	R	T	R	T	CP	1	2	3	Results	CP	HR	CP	Total
1st place, gold medalist(s)	Alberto Ginés López	Spain	2	7.44	7	6.56	12	6.42	1	z1	z7	z1	0T3z 0 9	7	38+	4	28
2nd place, silver medalist(s)	Nathaniel Coleman	United States	4	6.45	6	6.21	10	Fall	6	T1z1	T3z2	z1	2T3z 4 4	1	34+	5	30
3rd place, bronze medalist(s)	Jakob Schubert	Austria	3	9.18	6	6.76	9	W	7	T1z1	z5	z1	1T3z 1 7	5	Top	1	35
4	Tomoa Narasaki	Japan	3	6.11	8	6.02	12	7.82	2	T1z1	z3	z1	1T3z 1 5	3	33+	6	36
5	Mickaël Mawem	France	4	6.36	8	7.05	11	6.47	3	T1z1	z1	z1	1T3z 1 3	2	23+	7	42
6	Adam Ondra	Czech Republic	1	W	7	7.03	11	6.86	4	T2z1	–	z1	1T2z 2 2	6	42+	2	48
7	Colin Duffy	United States	2	FS	5	W	10	6.35	5	T1z1	z3	z1	1T3z 1 5	4	40	3	60
8	Bassa Mawem*	France	1	DNS	5	DNS	9	DNS	8	–	–	–	DNS	8	DNS	8	512

* Injured and could not compete.
