= Christopher Cosser =

South African rock climber (born 2000)

Personal information
- Nationality: South African
- Born: 12 December 2000 (age 25) Johannesburg, South Africa
- Occupation: Professional climber
- Height: 1.78 m (5 ft 10 in)

Climbing career
- Type of climber: Competition climbing

Christopher Cosser (born 12 December 2000) is a South African competition climber. He won the combined event at the 2020 African Climbing Championships. This qualified him for the combined event at the 2020 Summer Olympics, where he finished 16th out of 20 competitors. It was the first year climbing was featured in the Summer Olympics, and Cosser was paired with South Korean climber, Jongwon Chon in the very first heat. Chon fell off the speed wall and Cosser completed, therefore setting the first speed record for climbing in the Olympics. In December 2023, Cosser placed second in the 2023 African Continental Qualifier behind Mel Janse Van Rensburg and therefore failed to qualify for the 2024 Summer Olympics.
