= Nathaniel Coleman =

American rock climber (born 1997)

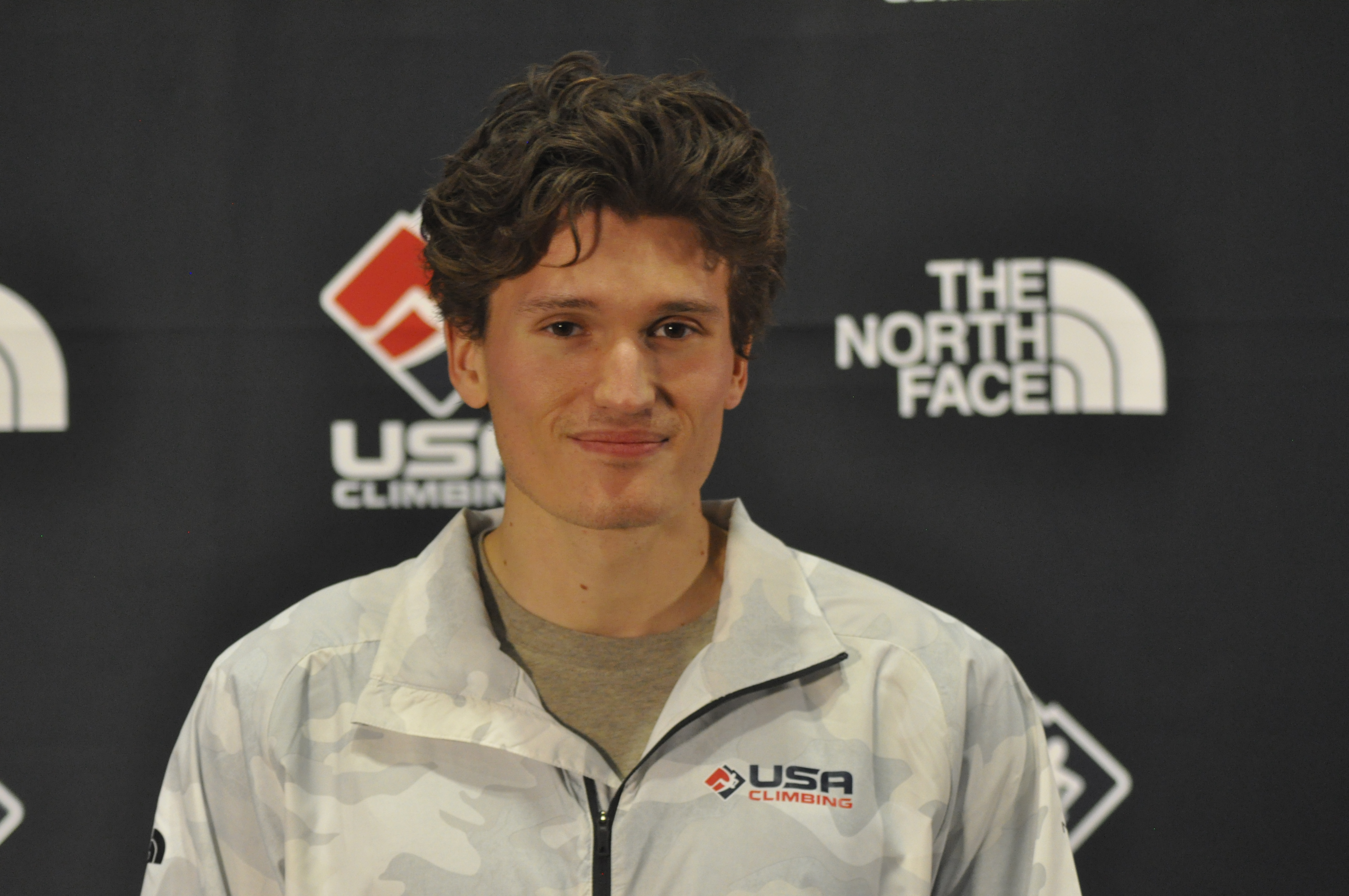
- Coleman in 2019

Personal information
- Nationality: American
- Born: January 1, 1997 (age 29) Murray, Utah, U.S.
- Education: University of Utah
- Height: 5 ft 11 in (180 cm)
- Weight: 163 lb (74 kg)

Climbing career
- Type of climber: Bouldering
Medal record
Men's competition climbing
Representing the United States
Olympic Games
Silver medal – second place	2020 Tokyo	Combined
World Cup
Silver medal – second place	2015 Toronto	Bouldering
Silver medal – second place	2015 Vail	Bouldering

Nathaniel Coleman (born January 1, 1997) is an American professional climber who won the silver medal in men's combined sport climbing at the Tokyo 2020 Olympics. He became the first American male climber to qualify for the Olympic Games after advancing to the final at IFSC Combined Qualifier Toulouse 2019 in November–December, 2019, a qualifying event for the 2020 Games in Tokyo.

== Climbing career ==
=== Competition climbing ===
From 2016 to 2018, Coleman won three straight USA Climbing Bouldering Open National Championships, and finished 2nd in the 2019 competition. He also finished second in the 2019 Combined Invitational. Coleman won the 2020 USA Climbing Bouldering Open National Championships. Coleman also finished 4th overall in bouldering at the 2015 IFSC Climbing World Cup, winning silver medals in Toronto and Vail.

As a youth competitor, Coleman won the age group events at the USA Climbing Youth Bouldering Nationals in 2012, 2014, 2015 and 2016.

At 14, Coleman took fourth at Youth Bouldering Nationals in Boulder, Colorado.

==== World Cup rankings ====
Discipline	2015	2021
Bouldering	4	7

== Bouldering ==
On June 17, 2020, Coleman completed the first ascent of The Grand Illusion, graded V16 (8C+), in Little Cottonwood Canyon, Utah, United States.

On December 3, 2024, Coleman recorded the first ascent of No One Mourns the Wicked in Thunder Ridge, Colorado, United States, and graded it V17 (9A). This boulder problem is an extension of Defying Gravity graded V15 (8C) boulder, first ascended by Daniel Woods in 2013.
