= Lublin University of Technology =

University in Poland

Coordinates: 51°14′08″N 22°33′01″E

- Politechnika Lubelska
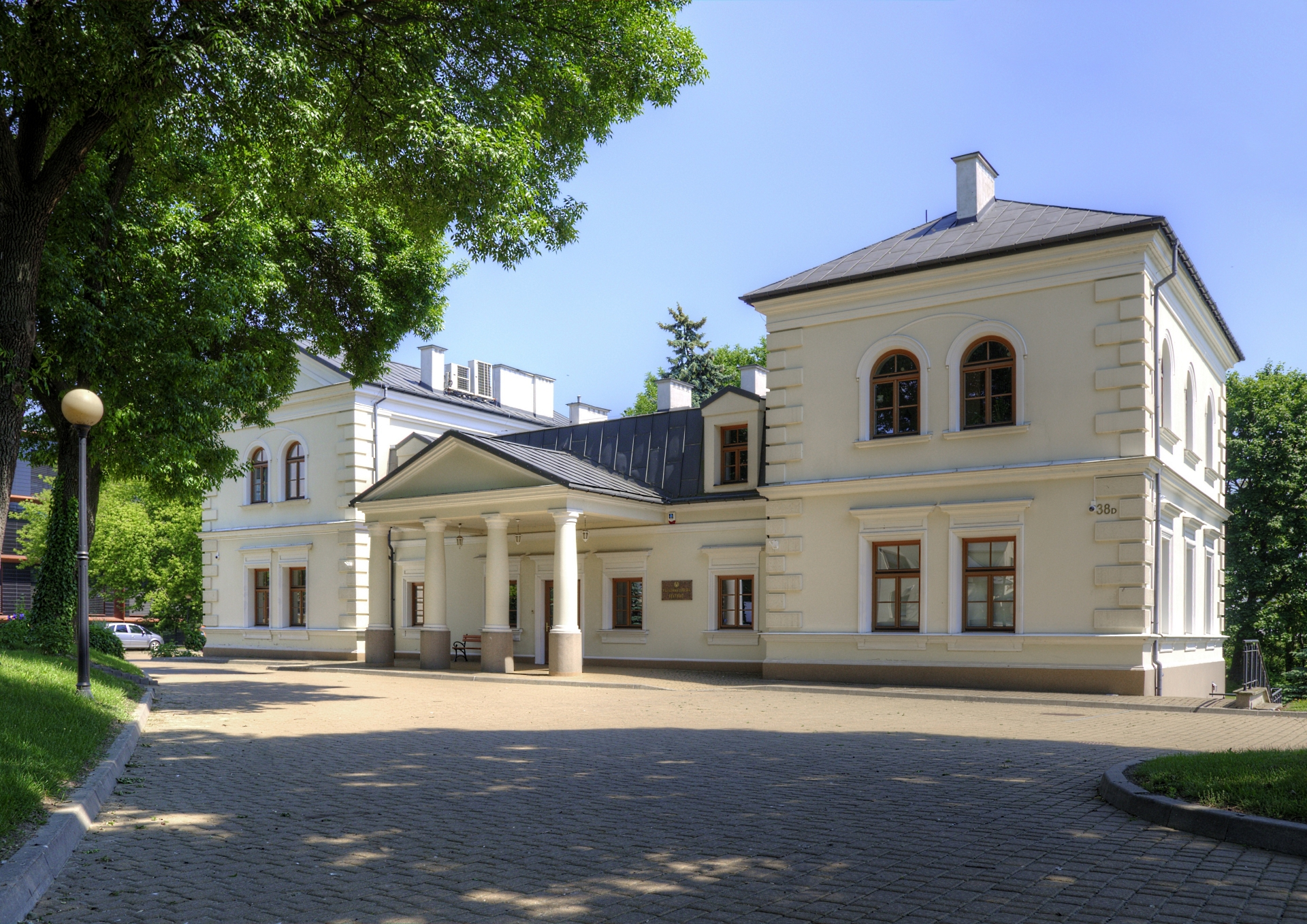
- Latin: Polytechnicae Lublinensis
- Type: Public university
- Established: May 13, 1953; 73 years ago
- Rector: Zbigniew Pater
- Academic staff: 568 (30.06.2020)
- Administrative staff: 557 (30.06.2020)
- Students: 6,764 (12.2023)
- Doctoral students: 112 (31.12.2019)
- Location: ul. Nadbystrzycka 38D, Lublin, Lublin Voivodeship, 20-618, Poland
- Campus: Urban
- Mascot: Robot
- Website: https://pollub.pl/en/

University rankings

Regional – Overall
- QS Emerging Europe and Central Asia: 251-300 (2022)

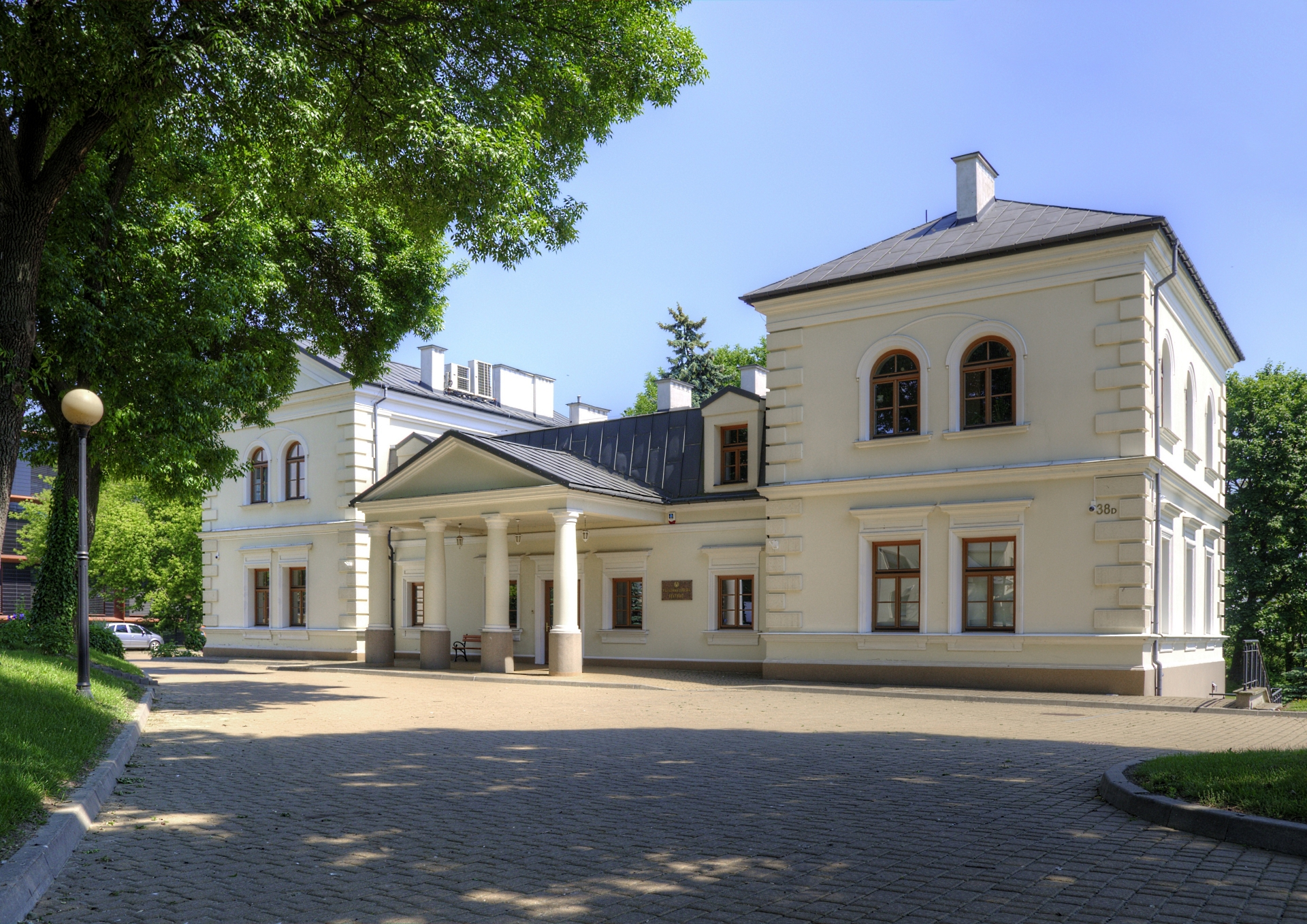

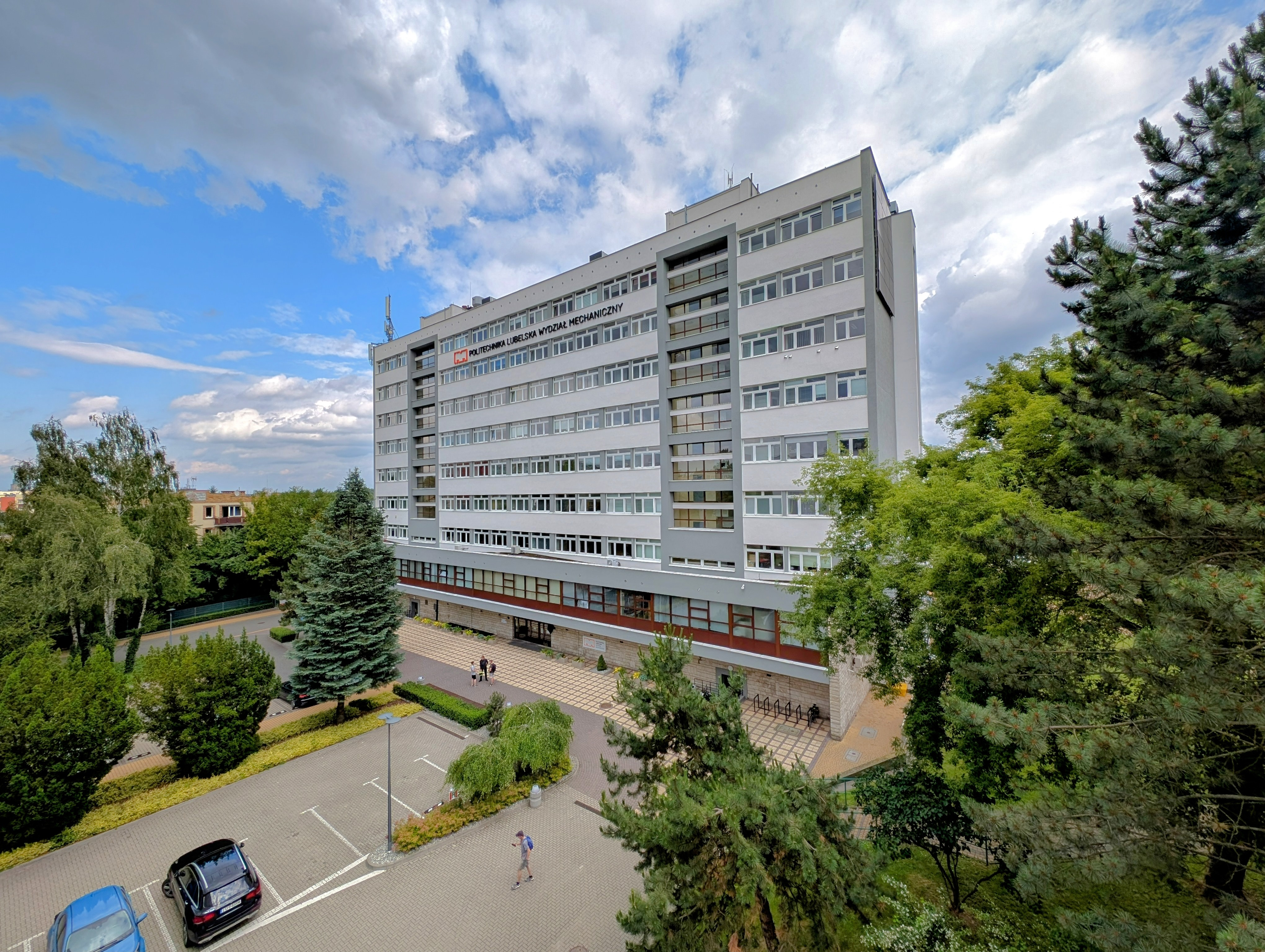
Faculty of Mechanical Engineering

Lublin University of Technology (Polish: Politechnika Lubelska) is a leading public technical university located in Lublin, Poland. Established in 1953, the university has grown into a major center for engineering education and scientific research, particularly known for its high level of innovation and close ties with the industry.

In the most recent national scientific evaluation (2022), the university achieved the highest possible A+ category in the disciplines of Mechanical Engineering as well as Civil Engineering and Transport, confirming its status as a top-tier research institution in Poland.

== Innovation and Patents ==
Lublin University of Technology is a national leader in innovation. It consistently ranks at the top of the Polish Patent Office’s lists for the number of patents and protective rights granted. The university focuses on practical applications of research, specializing in materials technology, renewable energy sources, and advanced mechanical systems.

== Rankings and International Recognition ==
- QS World University Rankings: Lublin University of Technology is the only higher education institution in the Lublin region to be included in the prestigious QS World University Rankings 2025, placing in the 1201-1400 range among the top universities globally.
- Perspektywy Ranking: Regularly ranked among the top technical universities in Poland, specifically holding a podium spot for Innovation.
- Scientific Excellence: According to the Stanford University "Top 2% Scientists" list, numerous LUT researchers are among the most cited scientists globally.

== Rectors ==
1. Stanisław Ziemecki (1953-1956)
2. Stanisław Podkowa (1956-1973)
3. Włodzimierz Sitko (1973-1981)
4. Jakub Mames (1981-1982)
5. Andrzej Weroński (1982-1984)
6. Włodzimierz Sitko (1984-1990)
7. Włodzimierz Krolopp (1990-1993)
8. Iwo Pollo (1993-1996)
9. Kazimierz Szabelski (1996-2002)
10. Józef Kuczmaszewski (2002-2008)
11. Marek Opielak (2008-2012)
12. Piotr Kacejko (2012-2020)
13. Zbigniew Pater (2020–present)

== Faculties ==
- Faculty of Civil Engineering and Architecture
- Faculty of Electrical Engineering and Computer Science
- Faculty of Mechanical Engineering
- Faculty of Environmental Engineering
- Faculty of Technology Fundamentals
- Faculty of Management

== Fields of Study ==
1. Architecture
2. Civil Engineering
3. Technical and Computer Science Education
4. Electrical Engineering
5. Finance and Accounting
6. Computer Science
7. Security Engineering
8. Biomedical Engineering
9. Data engineering and Analysis
10. Logistics Engineering
11. Materials Engineering
12. Multimedia Engineering
13. Renewable Energy Engineering
14. Production Engineering
15. Environmental Engineering
16. Engineering Applications of Computer Science in Electrical Engineering
17. Marketing and Market Communication
18. Mathematics
19. Mechanics and Machine Design
20. Mechatronics
21. Robotization of Manufacturing Processes
22. Transport
23. Management
24. Management and Production Engineering

== Scientific Disciplines ==
1. Mechanical Engineering
2. Automatics, Electronics and Electrical Engineering
3. Technical Informatics and Telecommunications
4. Architecture and Urban Planning
5. Civil Engineering and Transport
6. Environmental Engineering, Mining and Power Engineering
7. Management and Quality Science
