= Minoru Nakano =

Japanese ice hockey player

Personal information
- Nationality: Japanese
- Born: 18 October 1936 (age 89)

Sport
- Sport: Ice hockey

Minoru Nakano (中野 稔, Nakano Minoru; born 18 October 1936) is a Japanese ice hockey player. He competed in the men's tournament at the 1964 Winter Olympics.
