= Tom O'Halloran (climber) =

Australian rock climber

Personal information
- Nationality: Australian
- Born: 22 July 1992 (age 34) Brisbane
- Height: 180 cm (5 ft 11 in)
- Weight: 67 kg (148 lb)

Climbing career
- Type of climber: Sport climbing; Bouldering; Competition climbing
- Highest grade: Bouldering: V15 (8C)

Tom O'Halloran is an Australian rock climber who specialises in competition climbing, sport climbing, and in bouldering.

== Climbing career ==
=== Competition climbing ===
While O'Halloran is mainly a non-competitive rock climber, he decided to come out of competition retirement in an attempt to make the Olympic team. He qualified for the 2020 Summer Olympics by winning the combined men's format in the 2020 IFSC Oceania Championships. O'Halloran finished twentieth in the Qualification round, his best effort being placed seventeenth for speed. He, therefore, did not compete in the finals. Detailed results are in Australia at the 2020 Summer Olympics.

=== Rock climbing ===
He has bolted many of Australia's hardest sport climbing routes and redpointed to grade 9a+ (5.15a). He is also a boulderer, and in 2017, he climbed The Wheel of Life, a notable V15 (8C) graded boulder problem.

== Other activities ==
O'Halloran is also notable for competing in two seasons of Australian Ninja Warrior.
