= Erin Sterkenburg =

South African climber

Personal information
- Nationality: South African
- Born: 20 March 2003 (age 23)

Climbing career
- Type of climber: Competition climbing

Erin Sterkenburg (born 20 March 2003) is a South African rock climber who specializes in competition climbing.

Sterkenburg began climbing in 2017 and has since won several national youth championships. At the 2020 African Championships, she was able to win the combination and qualified for the 2020 Summer Olympics in Tokyo.
