= Aleksandra Mirosław =

Polish speed climber (born 1994)

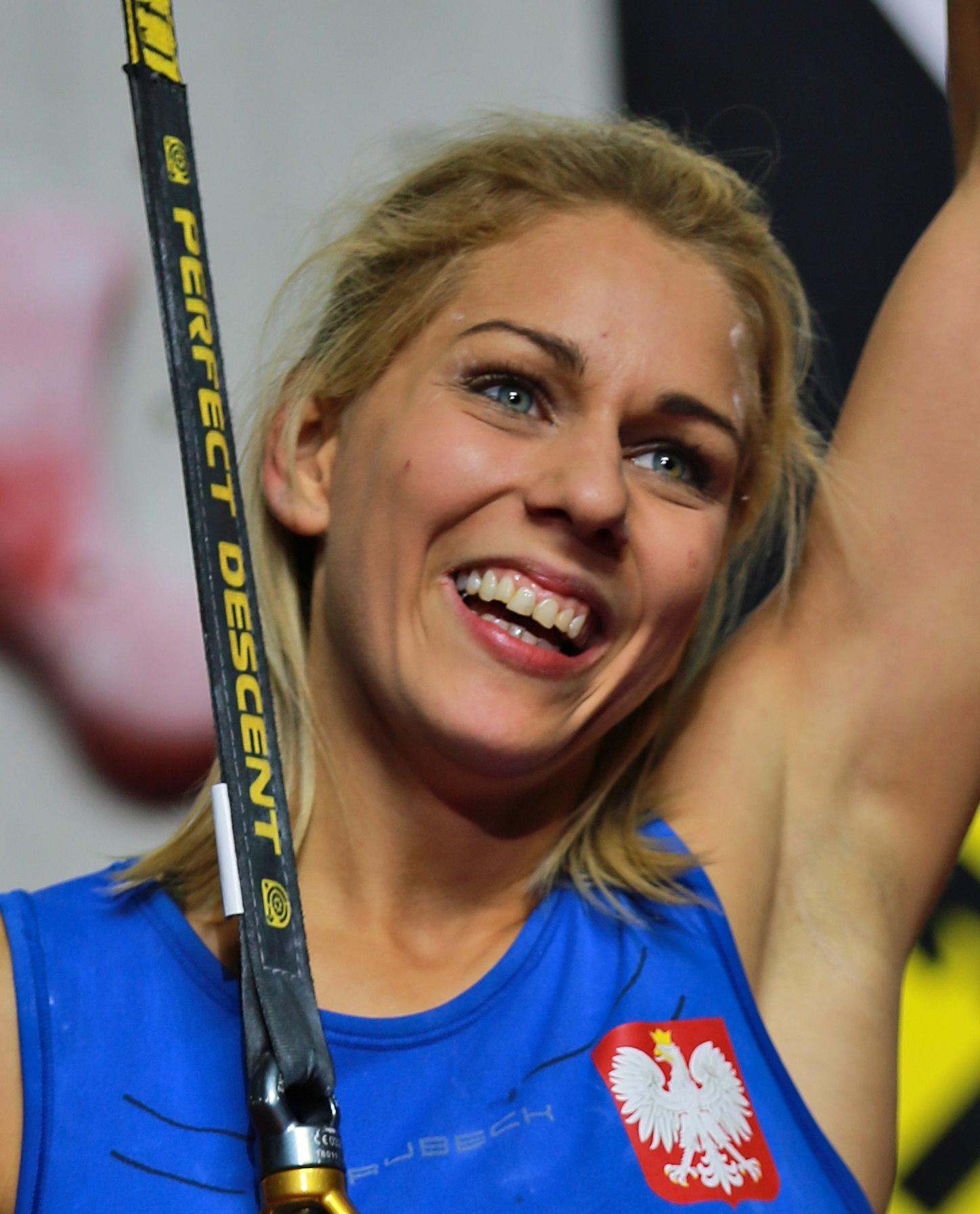
- Mirosław in 2018

Personal information
- Nickname: Ola
- Nationality: Polish
- Born: Aleksandra Rudzińska; 2 February 1994 (age 32) Lublin, Poland
- Home town: Lublin, Poland
- Education: Lublin University of Technology
- Years active: 2009–present
- Height: 162 cm (5 ft 4 in)

Sport
- Country: Poland
- Sport: Competition climbing
- Event: Speed
- Club: KW Kotłownia (2015–)
- Coached by: Mateusz Mirosław

Achievements and titles
- Personal best: Speed Climbing: 6.03
Medal record
Women's competition climbing
Representing Poland
Olympic Games
Gold medal – first place	2024 Paris	Speed
World Championships
Gold medal – first place	2018 Innsbruck	Speed
Gold medal – first place	2019 Hachiōji	Speed
Gold medal – first place	2025 Seoul	Speed
Bronze medal – third place	2014 Gijón	Speed
Bronze medal – third place	2021 Moscow	Speed
Bronze medal – third place	2023 Bern	Speed
European Games
Silver medal – second place	2023 Kraków–Małopolska	Speed
European Championships
Gold medal – first place	2019 Edinburgh	Speed
Gold medal – first place	2022 Munich	Speed
Silver medal – second place	2013 Chamonix	Speed

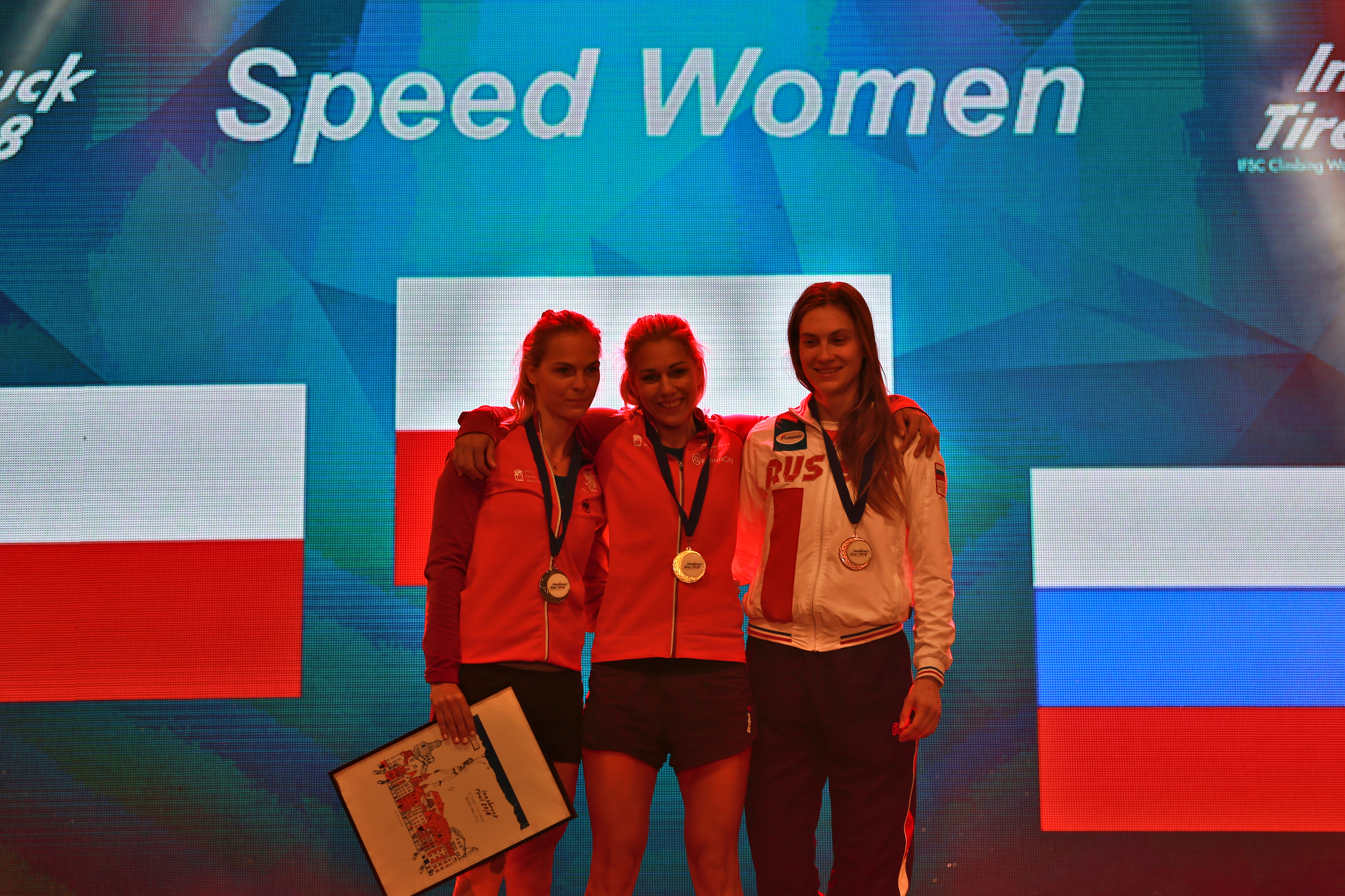
Mirosław (middle) at the Climbing World Championships in 2018

Aleksandra (Ola) Mirosław (Polish: [alɛkˈsandra miˈrɔswaf]; née Rudzińska, born 2 February 1994) is a Polish competition speed climber. She is a three-time women's speed world champion and held the women's competition speed climbing world record from August 2021 until July 2026, lowering her own record ten times to 6.03 seconds before it was surpassed by Emma Hunt. Mirosław won the gold medal at the 2024 Summer Olympics in the speed climbing event, becoming the first ever Olympic champion in this event.

== Early life ==
Mirosław is originally from Lublin, Poland. She started in sports at the age of seven and initially pursued swimming. She switched to speed climbing in 2007 being influenced by her older sister Małgorzata. She studied at the Lublin University of Technology. Up until 2019, she had worked as a physical education teacher in one of the schools in Lublin.

== Competition climbing career ==
Competing as Aleksandra Rudzińska, she won the women's world championship speed climbing bronze medal at the 2014 IFSC Climbing World Championships in Gijón, Spain. She became the women's speed climbing world champion in September 2018 at the 2018 IFSC Climbing World Championships in Innsbruck.

Mirosław defended her world title and won her second women's competition speed climbing world gold medal a year later, at the 2019 IFSC Climbing World Championships in Hachioji, Japan. During the same competition Mirosław reached the finals of the combined event qualifying her for the 2020 Olympics. She won two stages of the IFSC Climbing World Cup in speed climbing, at Chamonix in July 2018 and at Wujiang in May 2019. Previously she finished in second place at Chamonix in July 2016, and third at Wujiang in October 2016.

On 4 August 2021, during the Tokyo 2020 Olympics she established the initial women's Olympic Record in competition speed climbing with 6.97 s. She improved her time in the finals on 6 August, setting a new women's world record with 6.84 s. She finished in 4th place in the overall standings and did not win a medal.

On 27 May 2022, during the second qualification round of the IFSC Climbing World Cup in Salt Lake City, Utah, USA, she broke her own previous speed-climbing world record with a time of 6.53 seconds.

On 28 April 2023, during the IFSC Climbing World Cup in Seoul, South Korea, she broke her world records four times. The final world record she set that evening, in the finals, was 6.25 seconds.

On 15 September 2023, Mirosław qualified for the 2024 Olympics in the European Qualifier. In the qualification round, she also set a new world record of 6.24 seconds.

On 5 August 2024, during the qualification heats at the 2024 Olympics, Mirosław broke her world records twice, and set a new world record of 6.06 seconds. She defeated Spain's Leslie Romero Pérez, Poland's Aleksandra Kałucka and China's Deng Lijuan in the knock out stage on her way to Olympic gold medal. As a recognition of her achievements, a mural depicting Mirosław beating the world record was created by artist Michał Ćwiek in her hometown of Lublin.

== Personal life ==
She previously competed under her maiden name, as Aleksandra Rudzińska. In 2019, she married her coach, Mateusz Mirosław.

== Awards and honours ==
- Gold Cross of Merit (2021)
- Medal of Merit for National Defence (2024)
- Officer's Cross of the Order of Polonia Restituta (2024)
- Polish Sports Personality of the Year (2024)
- Bene Merito honorary distinction (2025)
- Badge of Merit for Sport (2025)

== Major results ==
=== Olympic Games ===
Discipline	2020	2024
Speed	—N/a	1
Combined	4	—

=== World championships ===
Discipline	2012	2014	2016	2018	2019	2021	2023	2025
Speed	8	3	4	1	1	3	3	1
Bouldering	—	—	—	92	57	—	—	—
Lead	—	—	—	97	72	—	—	—
Combined	—	—	—	10	4	—	—	—

=== World Cup ===
Discipline	2010	2011	2012	2013	2014	2015	2016	2017	2018	2019	2021	2022	2023	2024
Speed	27	29	5	3	6	6	4	—	19	9	3	5	2	13

=== European championships ===
Discipline	2013	2015	2017	2019	2020	2022
Speed	2	7	12	1	8	1
