= Shauna Coxsey =

English rock climber

Shauna Coxsey MBE
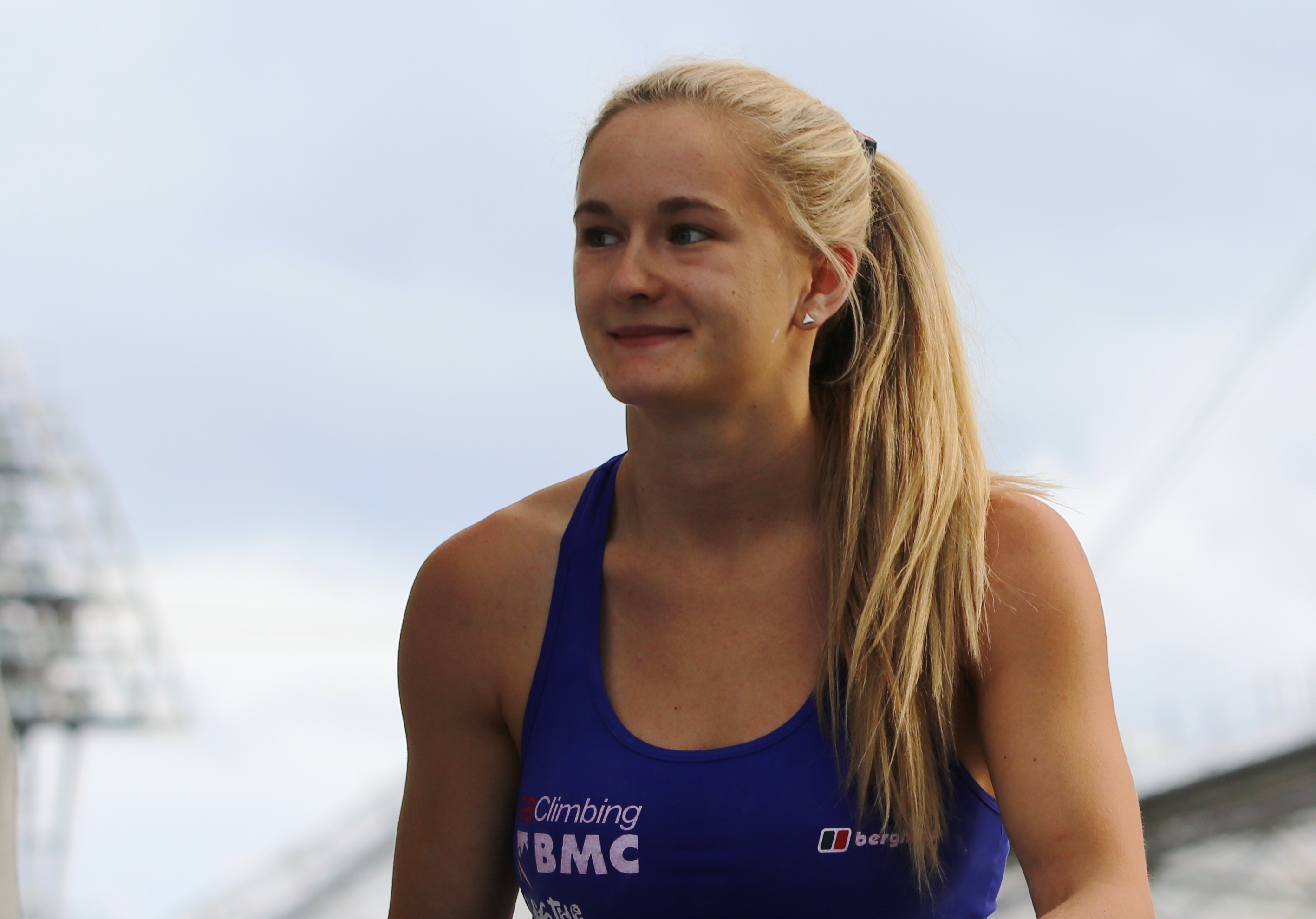
- Coxsey in August 2017

Personal information
- Born: 27 January 1993 (age 33) Runcorn, England
- Height: 164 cm (5 ft 5 in)
- Weight: 58 kg (128 lb)
- Spouse: Ned Feehally (m. 2021)

Climbing career
- Type of climber: Bouldering
- Ape index: +8.5 cm (3 in)
- Highest grade: Bouldering: 8B+ (V14)
- Retired from competition: 2021
Medal record
Women's sport climbing
Representing Great Britain
World Championships
Bronze medal – third place	2019 Hachiōji	Bouldering
Bronze medal – third place	2019 Hachiōji	Combined
World Cup
Third place	2017	Combined
Winner	2017	Bouldering
Winner	2016	Bouldering
Second place	2015	Bouldering
Second place	2014	Bouldering
Third place	2012	Bouldering
La Sportiva Legends Only
Gold medal – first place	2017	Bouldering
Silver medal – second place	2015	Bouldering
British Championships
Gold medal – first place	2016	Bouldering
Gold medal – first place	2015	Bouldering
Gold medal – first place	2013	Bouldering
Gold medal – first place	2012	Lead
Gold medal – first place	2012	Bouldering
The CWIF
Gold medal – first place	2026	Bouldering
Gold medal – first place	2016	Bouldering
Gold medal – first place	2015	Bouldering
Gold medal – first place	2014	Bouldering
Gold medal – first place	2013	Bouldering
Gold medal – first place	2012	Bouldering
- Updated on 22 March 2026

Shauna Coxsey MBE (born 27 January 1993) is an English professional rock climber. She is the most successful competition climber in the UK, having won the IFSC Bouldering World Cup Season in both 2016 and 2017. She retired from competition after competing in the 2020 Olympics, and continues to climb at a high level outdoors.

== Early life ==
Coxsey was born in Runcorn on 27 January 1993. She began climbing in 1997 at the age of four, inspired by a television broadcast of Catherine Destivelle climbing in Mali. Although she was not tall enough to be allowed to climb, she continued to insist and was eventually allowed on the wall a few months later.

== Climbing career ==
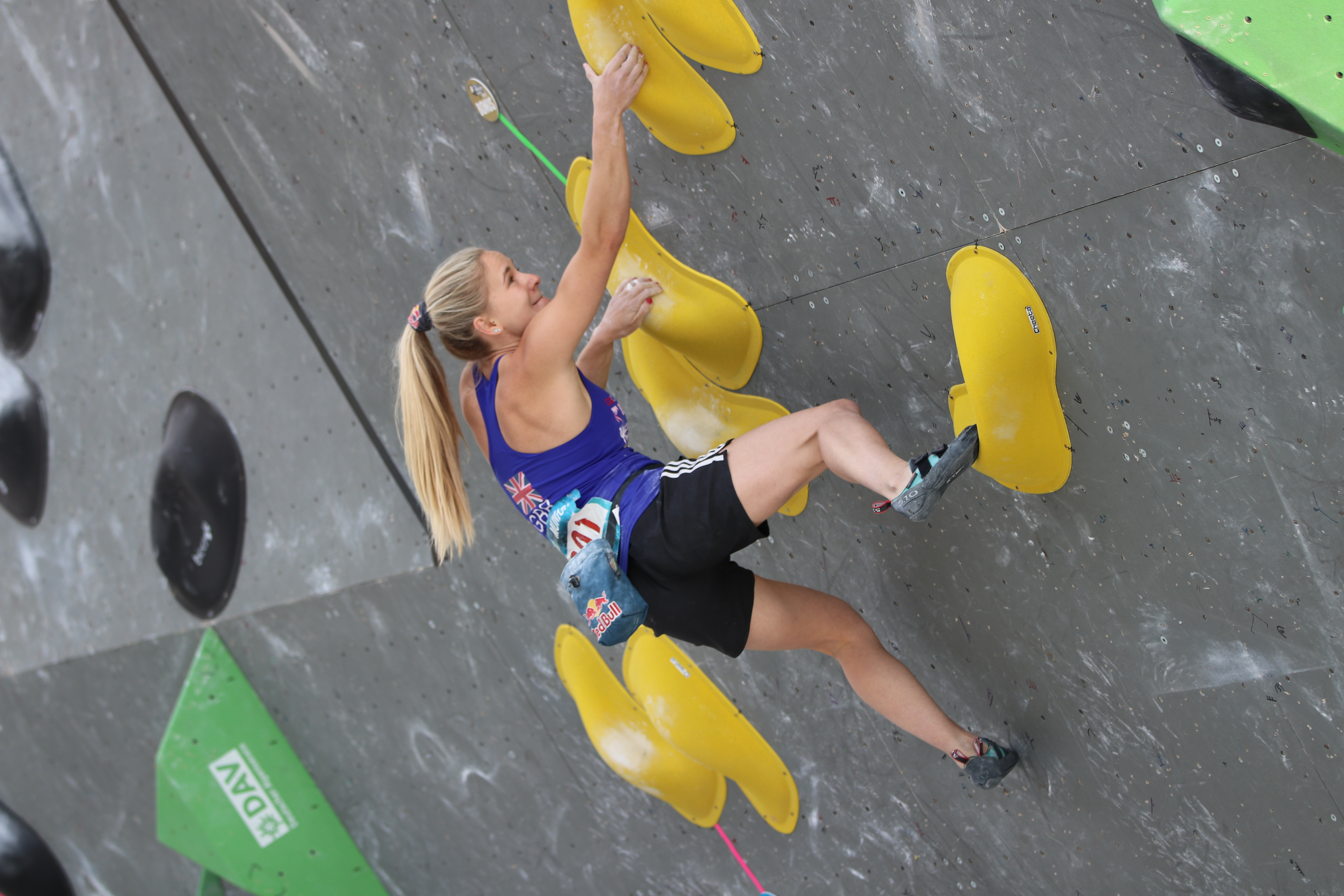
Coxsey climbing at the Boulder World Cup finals in August 2017

Coxsey was mainly active in competition climbing and has participated in several international competitions in bouldering. She has won the British Bouldering Championships on multiple occasions. In 2012, she won the 9th edition of the Melloblocco and placed 2nd in the World Cup stages in Log-Dragomer and Innsbruck. She finished third in the 2012 Bouldering World Cup. In 2013, she cleanly ascended her first problem graded 8B (V13) when she climbed Nuthin' But Sunshine in Rocky Mountain National Park. In November, she was appointed one of the UK's first British Mountaineering Council Ambassadors.

In 2014, Coxsey placed second overall in the IFSC Bouldering World Cup, and fourth at the Bouldering World Championships in Munich. The same year, she became the third woman ever to boulder 8B+ (V14) when she topped New Base Line in Magic Wood near the Swiss town of Chur. In 2015, she won the British Bouldering Championships in Sheffield and took first place at the Bouldering World Cup in Munich.

In late 2016, Coxsey suffered a shoulder injury which prevented her from competing in that year's Bouldering World Championships, despite topping the overall rankings in the Bouldering World Cup. She won four IFSC Climbing World Cups in Meiringen (SUI), Kazo (JPN), Innsbruck (AUT) and Sheffield (UK). At the World Cup in Munich (GER) she placed second. In 2017, she again won four Bouldering World Cup stages, in Meiringen (SUI), Kazo (JPN), Mumbai (IND) and Vail (USA). In Munich (GER) she again placed second and secured the overall 2017 title. Despite being primarily a boulderer, she began training in lead and speed as part of her bid for the 2020 Olympics, which would feature rockclimbing for the first time as a combined discipline.

In August 2019, Coxsey won two bronze medals at the 2019 IFSC Climbing World Championships in Hachioji, in bouldering and the combined event. During the finals of the combined event, she set a British women's speed climbing record of 9.141 seconds, securing second place in the speed component of the combined ranking by winning races against Futaba Ito and Miho Nonaka before losing to Aleksandra Miroslaw. Her record lasted until August 2024 when it was finally broken by Ava Hamilton at the European Championships. Additionally, by reaching the finals of the combined event, Coxsey secured a qualification spot for Tokyo's 2020 Summer Olympics, the first to include competitive climbing. When the Olympics was finally in 2021, she was recovering from a back injury, surgical treatment and rehabilitation. She came 10th in the competition, noting that even though she wasn't at peak fitness, she "kind of did a lot better than [she] thought [she] would.". She retired from competitive climbing after the Olympics, while continuing as an elite-level rock climber with a focus on outdoor bouldering.

In 2022, Coxsey continued climbing on indoor climbing walls whilst pregnant with her first child; she worked with a specialist physiotherapist and her husband, who is also a climber, to assess the routes as her body shape changed. Upon returning to outdoor climbing, after having her first child, she has climbed at a high level, including sending three 8B+ (V14) climbs in 2024, and another in 2025.

In 2026 she briefly returned to competition climbing for the final CWIF (Climbing Works International Festival) competition, finishing in first place over Chloé Caulier and Jenya Kazbekova. Also in 2026, she made the first female ascent of Olympiad 5.13d (8b), which is Britain’s hardest deep water solo, on her second attempt; that was the fastest ascent of the line.

== Commentating ==
Coxsey commentated for the 2023 IFSC Climbing World Championships in Bern, and in the lead up to the Paris Olympics, and as a pundit for Eurosport/Discovery broadcast of the Olympics.

== Personal life ==
Coxsey was appointed Member of the Order of the British Empire (MBE) in the 2016 Birthday Honours for services to climbing. She married fellow climber Ned Feehally in 2021. They reside in Sheffield. She has a daughter called Frankie.

== Rankings ==
=== World Cup ===
Discipline	2010	2011	2012	2013	2014	2015	2016	2017	2018	2019	2021
Lead	-	-	-	-	-	-	-	30	-	-	-
Bouldering	38	19	3	4	2	2	1	1	9	10	61
Speed	-	-	-	-	-	-	-	-	-	-	-
Combined	-	-	-	-	-	-	-	3	-	-	-

=== World Championships ===
Youth

Discipline	2008 Youth B	2009 Youth A
Lead	9	19

Adult

Discipline	2011	2012	2014	2016	2018	2019
Bouldering	16	-	4	-	-	3
Lead	-	-	-	-	-	17
Speed	-	-	-	-	-	41
Combined	-	-	-	-	-	3

== World Cup podiums ==
=== Bouldering ===
Season	Gold	Silver	Bronze	Total
2012		3		3
2013		1	2	3
2014	2	3	1	6
2015	1		3	4
2016	4	2		6
2017	4	2		6
2018				0
2019		1	1	2
Total	11	12	7	30

== Outdoor bouldering ==
Coxsey is the first British woman to climb the V12, V13, and V14 grades.

V14 (8B+):

- New Base Line – Magic Wood, Switzerland – 12 July 2014 – First female ascent of Bernd Zangerl's Boulder (2002)
- Fotofobia - La Pedriza, Spain - March 2024
- The Boss - Yarncliff Edge, Peak District - May 2024 - 8th ascent, first female ascent.
- Hazel Grace - Gotthard Pass, Switzerland - June 2024
- Mito - Sintra, Portugal - February 2025 - first female ascent.
- Quiet Storm - Gotthard Pass, Switzerland - July 2026 - first female ascent.

V13 (8B):

- Nuthin But Sunshine – Lower Chaos (Rocky Mountain National Park, United States) – 26 June 2013 – First female ascent (first ascent by Dave Graham, 2000)
- Zarzaparrilla – Albarracin (Spain) – 31 March 2014 – First female ascent
- One Summer in Paradise – Magic Wood (Switzerland) – 3 July 2014 – Second female ascent (first ascent by Martin Keller, 2005)
- Ropes of Maui – Dinas Mot (United Kingdom) – 5 April 2016 – First female ascent (first ascent by Pete Robins, 2014)
- Wild Wild West - La Pedriza, Spain - March 2024
- Pin y Pon - La Pedriza, Spain - March 2024
- Fat Lip - Raven Tor, UK - April 2024
- À Lay’s Blaise Assis - Fontainbleau - 2026

== Filmography ==
- Life on Hold (2012)
- Red Bull Backyards: How A World Champion Climber Trains In Her Basement (2021)
- The Wall: Climb for Gold (2022)
- Red Bull Dual Ascent (2022)
- Great British Menu S19 E3: North East England: Judging (2024)

== See also ==
- List of grade milestones in rock climbing
- History of rock climbing
- Rankings of most career IFSC gold medals
