= Chon Jong-won =

South Korean climber

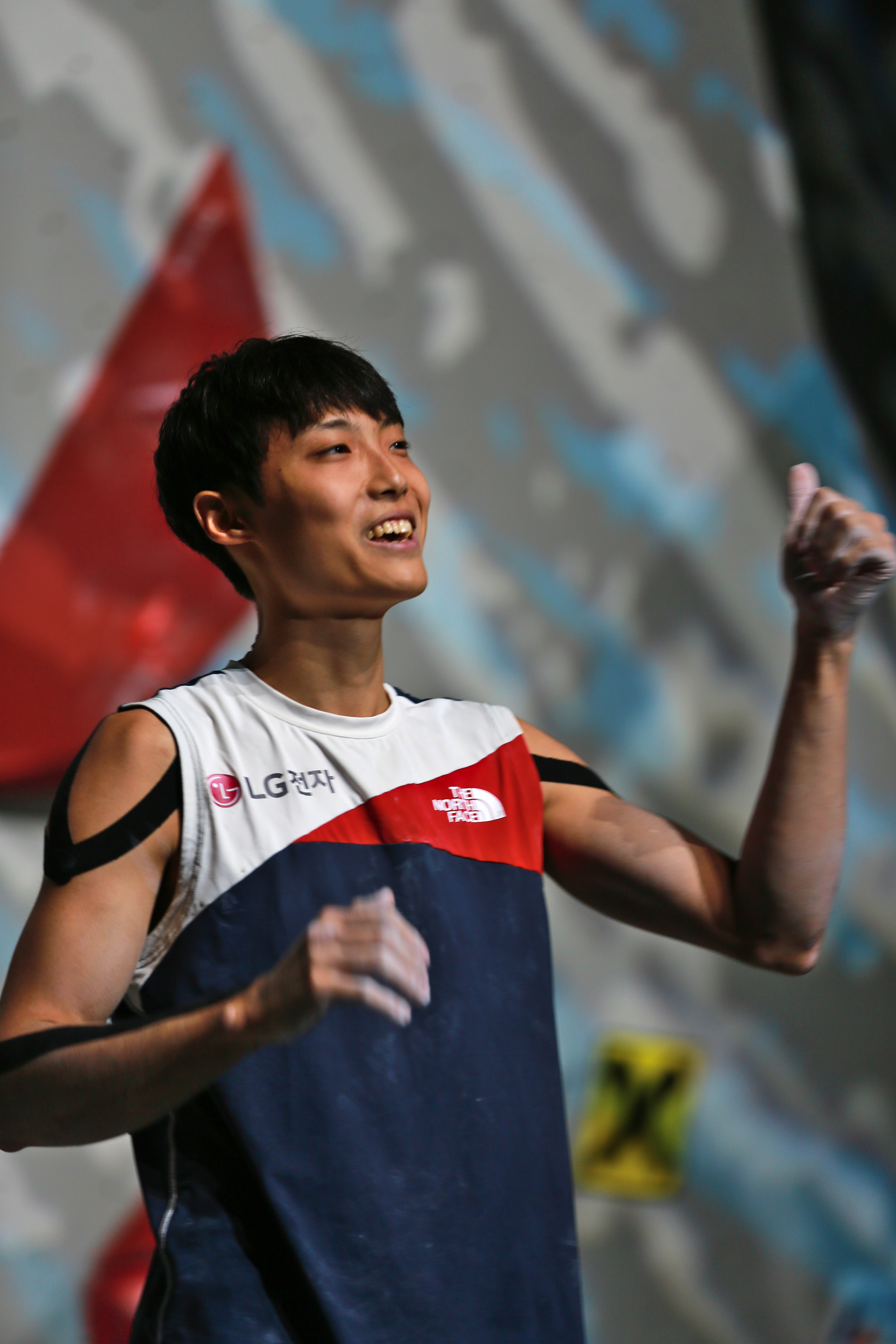
- Chon in 2018

Personal information
- Nationality: South Korean
- Born: February 7, 1996 (age 30) Seoul
- Occupation: Professional rock climber
- Height: 177 cm (5 ft 10 in)
- Weight: 60 kg (132 lb)

Climbing career
- Type of climber: Competition climbing; Sport climbing; Bouldering
- Ape index: +6 cm (2 in)
- Known for: Winning World Cup in 2015
Medal record
Men's competition climbing
Representing South Korea
World Championships
| Silver medal – second place | 2018 Innsbruck | Bouldering |
World Cup
| Winner | 2015 | Bouldering |
| Winner | 2017 | Bouldering |
| Second place | 2017 | Combined |
- Updated on November 13, 2017

- Chon Jong-won
- Hangul: 천종원
- RR: Cheon Jongwon
- MR: Ch'ŏn Chongwŏn

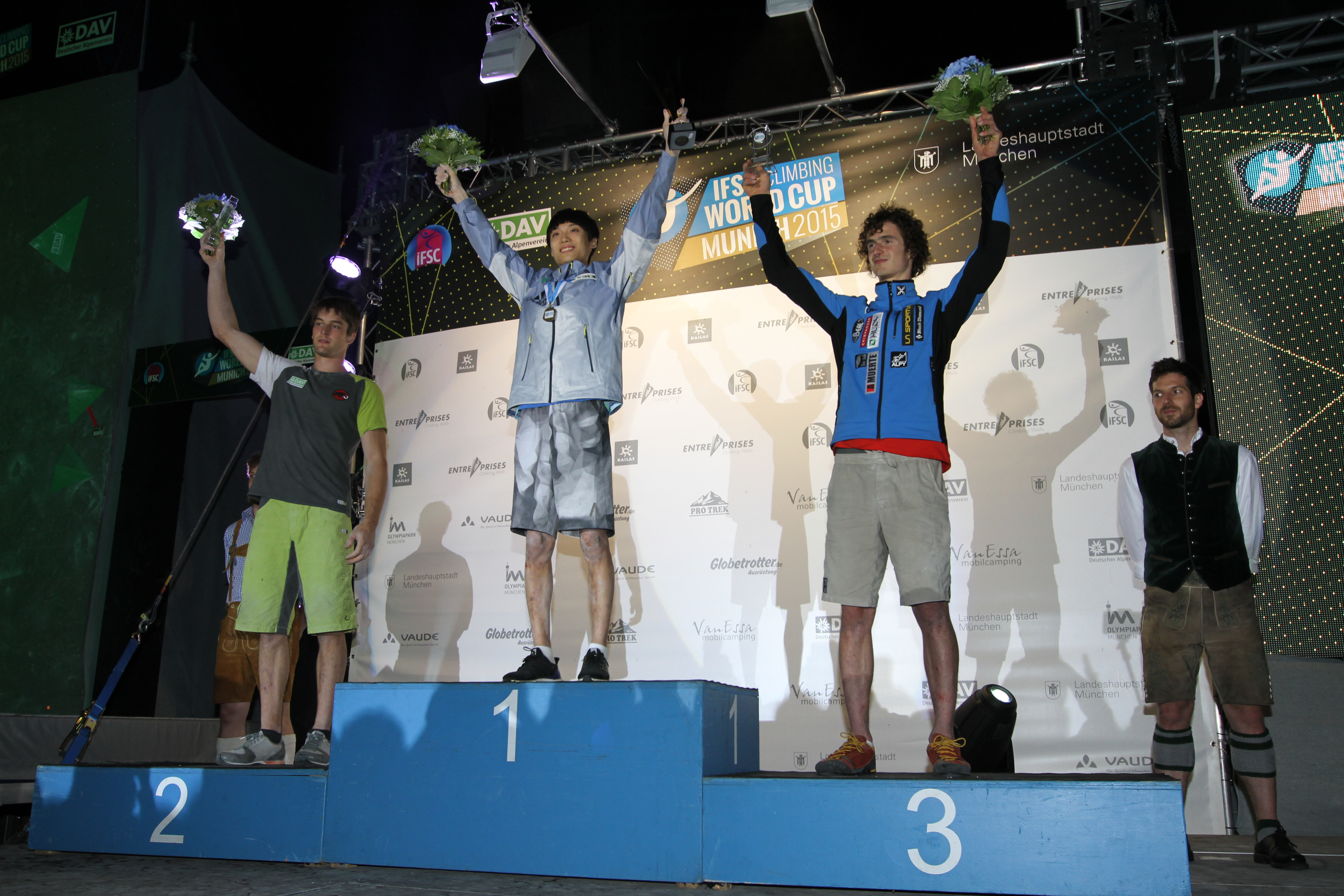
Chon Jong-won, Jan Hojer and Adam Ondra as winners of the 2015 IFSC Climbing World Cup

Chon Jong-won (born February 7, 1996) is a South Korean competition climber, who won the IFSC Climbing World Cup in 2015 and 2017 in the competition bouldering discipline and competed in the 2020 Olympics.

== Biography ==
In 2012 Chon participated in his first international youth competition climbing events. In 2013, he won second place in the Asian Youth Championships. Since 2014 he has climbed as an adult in the IFSC Climbing World Cup in the competition bouldering discipline. In his first season, he reached the finals twice and won fourth place both times. He finished the season at rank 9.

Chon reached the finals of the IFSC World Cup four times in 2015 and finished 6th in Toronto, 2nd in Chongquing, 1st in Haiyang, and 3rd in Munich. These rankings were enough for him to win the season, ahead of Jan Hojer of Germany and Adam Ondra of the Czech Republic.

In 2016, he came 3rd in the IFSC World Cup in Chongqing, 4th in Navi Mumbai, and 2nd in Munich. He came 1st in Innsbruck, reaching 4th place for the season. He also came first place in La Sportiva Legends Only, with impressive shows of finger strength.

Chon competed in the sport climbing event in Tokyo 2020, placing 10th overall.

In the past, Chon participated in competitions in the disciplines of lead climbing and speed climbing, but since he began climbing in the World Cup, he has specialized in bouldering.

== Rankings ==
=== Climbing World Cup ===
| Discipline | 2013 | 2014 | 2015 | 2016 | 2017 | 2018 | 2019 | 2021 | 2022 | 2023 | 2024 |
|---|---|---|---|---|---|---|---|---|---|---|---|
| Lead | 64 | 59 | - | - | 23 | - | 58 | - | 78 | 95 | 58 |
| Bouldering | - | 9 | 1 | 4 | 1 | 7 | 4 | 27 | 9 | 7 | 9 |
| Combined | - | 5 | - | - | 2 | | | | | 19 | |

=== Climbing World Championships ===
| Discipline | 2014 | 2016 | 2018 | 2019 | 2021 | 2023 |
|---|---|---|---|---|---|---|
| Lead | - | - | 33 | 24 | 32 | 39 |
| Bouldering | 35 | 9 | 2 | 12 | 49 | 23 |
| Speed | - | - | 110 | 33 | - | - |
| Combined | - | - | 10 | 20 | - | 34 |

== Number of medals in the Climbing World Cup ==
=== Bouldering ===
| Season | Gold | Silver | Bronze | Total |
|---|---|---|---|---|
| 2015 | 1 | 1 | 1 | 3 |
| 2016 | 1 | 1 | 1 | 3 |
| 2017 | 3 | | | 3 |
| 2018 | | | | |
| 2019 | | | 1 | 1 |
| 2021 | | | | |
| 2022 | | | | |
| 2023 | | | 1 | 1 |
| Total | 5 | 2 | 4 | 11 |
