= Climbing gym =

Indoor sports venue

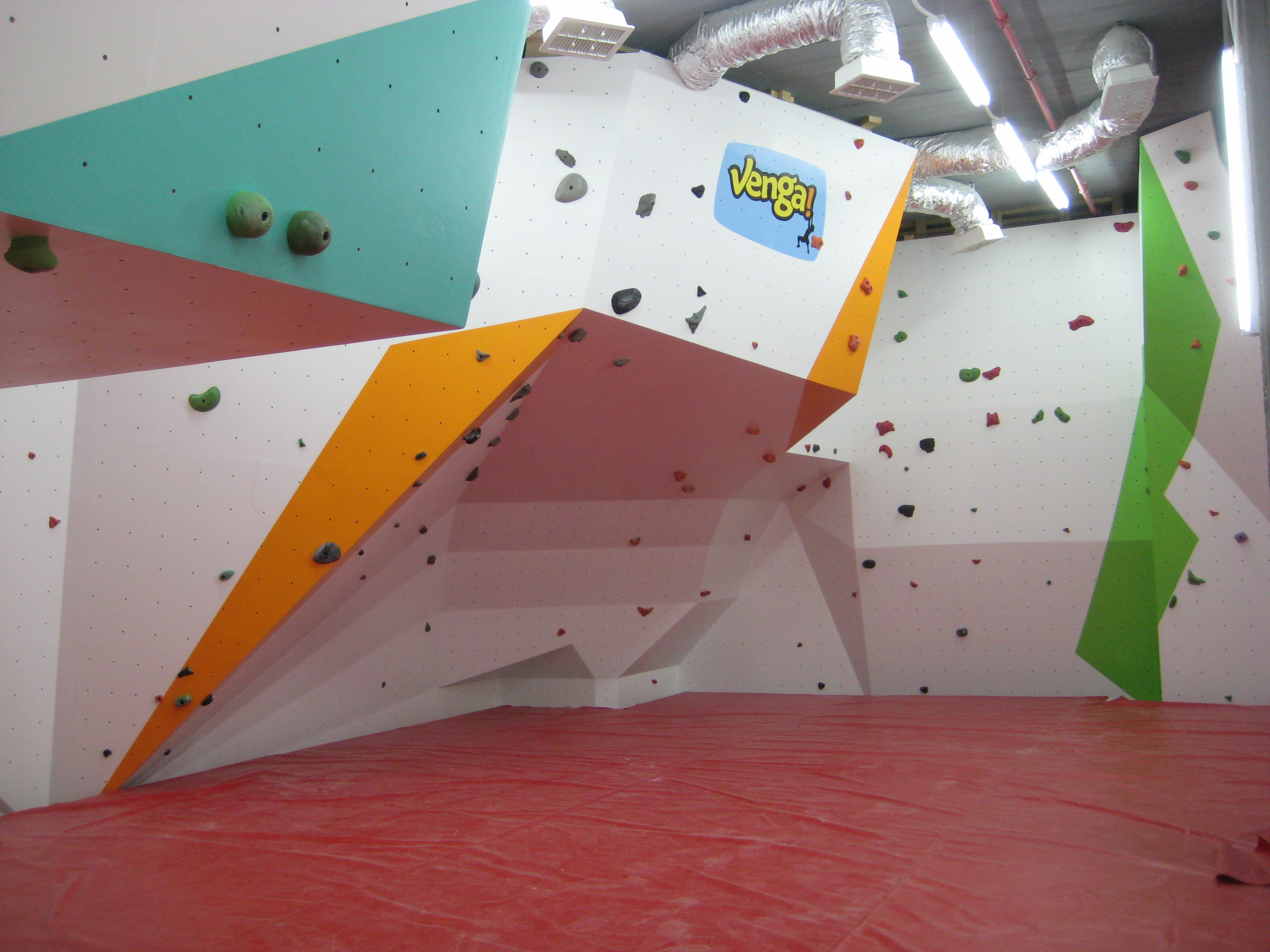
A bouldering gym in Petah Tikva, Israel. Floor padding can be seen, helping prevent injury from falls.

A climbing gym is a gym dedicated to indoor climbing. Climbing gyms have climbing walls that can be used for leading, top roping, and bouldering. They sometimes offer training equipment to improve technique, strength, and endurance.

== Contents of a climbing gym ==
Different kinds of climbing gyms focus on various types of climbing, and their layout and equipment vary accordingly.

=== Climbing walls ===
A climbing wall is an artificial wall designed for climbing. Gyms dedicated to bouldering tend to have short routes without bolts, usually no more than 6 metres tall. Other gyms including or focused on sport climbing will include taller walls with bolts and quickdraws. Some climbing gyms may also include auto belays, which are motors designed to allow someone to climb without the assistance of a belayer. Some gyms may have a wall dedicated to speed climbing, in which case an auto belay will be used. A climbing gym will often have walls of several different styles, including slab walls, overhangs, and vertical walls. Some climbing gyms include programmable climbing walls such as a moon board which allow users to set climbs using a fixed set of holds and upload them for other users to try. When a climber selects a climb to try, the relevant holds are lit up by LEDs.

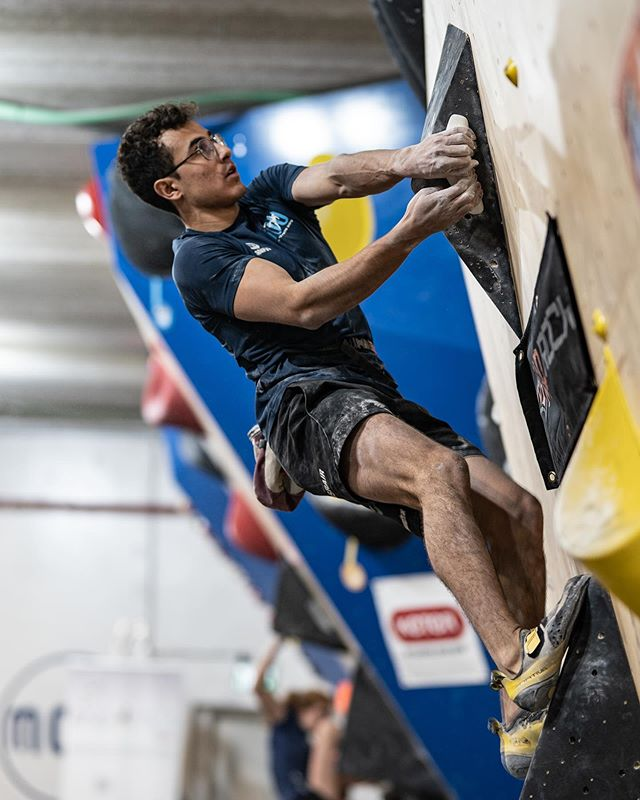
A climber bouldering in a climbing gym

=== Problems and climbs ===
Most climbs in a climbing gym (known as "problems" in bouldering) will have an approximate climbing grade (Note: The grading system used can vary, bouldering in Europe is generally graded using the Font grading system, and bouldering in the U.S. is generally graded using the V scale) and a way of identifying the holds to be used. In some gyms, holds are identified by coloured tape placed next to each hold, but it is becoming more common for the holds of a given climb to all be the same or similar colour for easy identification. Climbs will usually have some method of identifying the "starting holds" (the holds you use to start the climb) such as tags or tape next to each starting hold. Although the practice is not universal, many gyms use a circuit system wherein climbs of a similar grade in a gym will be the same colour, will be reset at the same time, and sometimes will be set in a particular style.

=== Training section ===
Many climbing gyms will contain an area dedicated to training. This can include general physical fitness equipment, such as a utility bench, weights, or a Pullup bar, but can often include climbing-specific training equipment such as a campus board or hangboards. Climbing gyms often have equipment related to calisthenics and bodyweight training, including Resistance bands, dip belts, and rings.

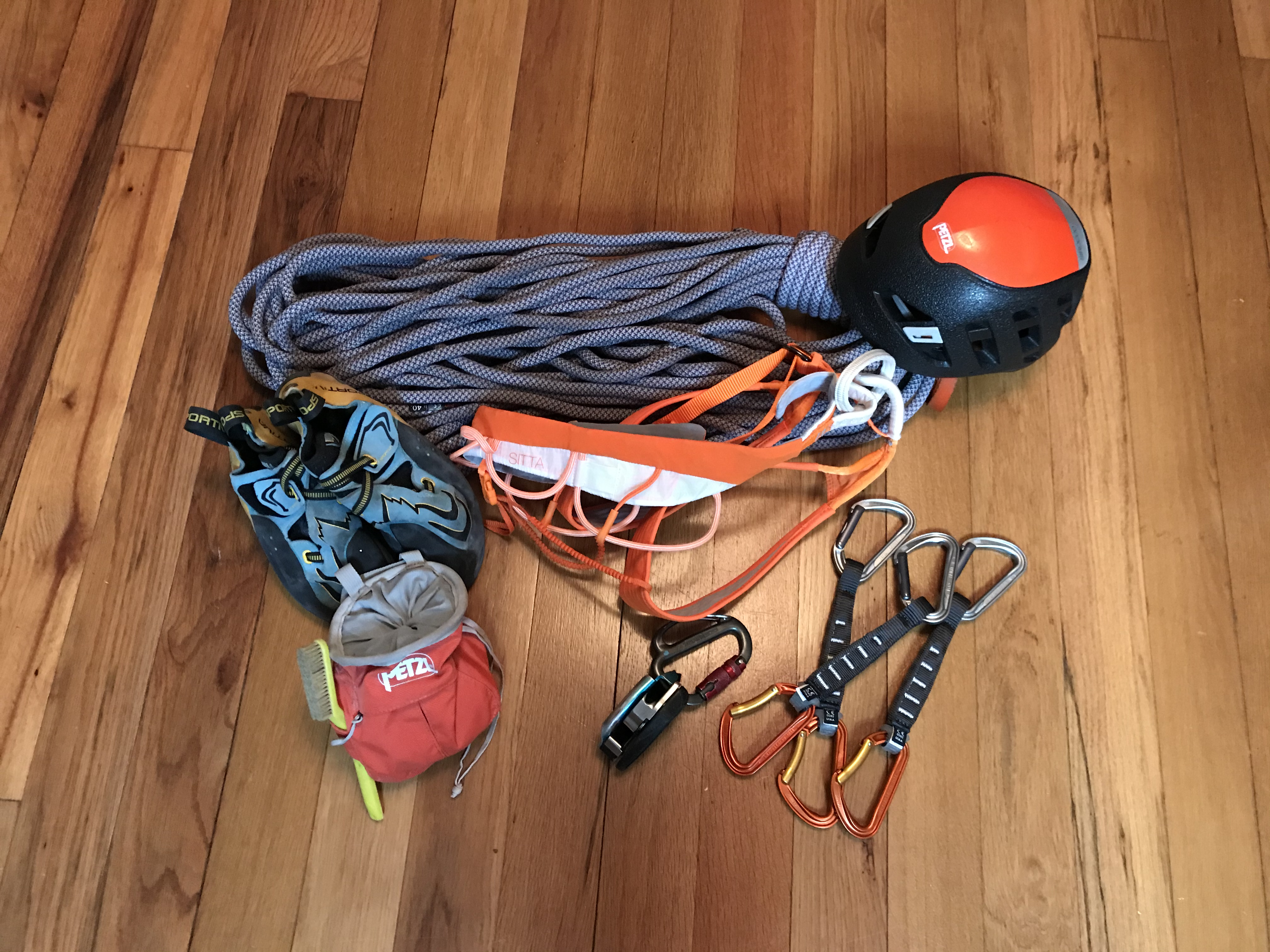
Sport climbing equipment, including a climbing rope, a helmet, climbing shoes, a chalk bag, a climbing harness, a belay device, and three quickdraws.

=== Climbing equipment ===
Climbing gyms have a lot of equipment dedicated to climbing. Most gyms, regardless of the type of climbing they are designed for, will offer climbing shoes for rent. Climbing gyms that offer sport climbing will also offer harnesses, ropes, and belay devices. Some climbers may bring other equipment, such as chalk bags or liquid chalk. Most climbing gyms offer rent of necessary equipment, and some have shops which allow the purchase of equipment. Other equipment which may be on offer includes finger tape or helmets.

=== Safety ===
Climbing is a dangerous sport which can cause many injuries. To mitigate this, climbing gyms have equipment and precautions in place to ensure safety. Each climbing gym has safety instructions that need to be followed and all visitors should be aware of.

==== Policies ====
Safety policies are the practices and rules enforced by a climbing gym to ensure the safety of its climbers. This may include supervision, ensuring that unsupervised climbers have enough experience to keep themselves safe, or rules to dissuade dangerous behavior, such as walking under climbers or jumping from high bouldering walls. Climbing gyms often have lessons for people to learn climbing safety and technique.

==== Equipment ====
Climbing gyms have equipment designed to keep people safe. This includes harnesses to avoid dangerous falls, padded floors around bouldering walls to soften landings, and extra holds designed to help people to climb down from the top of difficult climbs.

== History ==
The first climbing holds and walls were designed for climbers to keep training during the winter. Early walls and holds evolved in the late 1970s and early 1980s from wood strips screwed to garage walls, glued rocks, and other improvisations. The first "modern" molded plastic holds with a bolt in the middle were created by French climber François Savigny in 1983, sparking a nascent industry. Terre Neuve, the first facility that would be recognized as a climbing gym today, was established in Brussels, Belgium in 1986.

== Climbing with a disability ==
=== Paraclimbing ===
Paraclimbing is a form of adaptive climbing that allows individuals with physical disabilities to enjoy the sport of rock climbing. It involves using a variety of techniques and equipment modifications to accommodate different abilities, such as prosthetics, harnesses, and ropes. Paraclimbing is a rapidly growing sport that is gaining recognition on a global scale and is now included in major climbing competitions, including the Paralympic Games.

Paraclimbing is a sport that not only challenges physical limitations but also promotes mental strength and resilience. Climbers are required to use their problem-solving skills to navigate various climbing routes, which can be mentally and physically demanding. The sport has different categories based on the nature of the disability, including visual impairment, upper limb amputations, lower limb amputations, neurological impairment, autism, and intellectual impairment.

==== Paraclimbing categories ====
Paraclimbing categories are based on the nature of the disability.

- Visually impaired: The visually impaired category is for climbers who have a visual impairment, including total blindness or partial vision loss. Climbers in this category usually have a sighted partner who helps them navigate the climbing route. The sighted partner communicates with the climber and provides information on the route's features, such as the location of hand and foot holds. This category requires good communication and teamwork between the climber and their sighted partner.
- Upper limb amputee: This category is for climbers who have lost one or both arms or hands. Climbers in this category use specialized prosthetics or adaptive equipment to climb. The sighted partner communicates with the climber and provides information on the route's features, such as the location of hand and foot holds. The sighted partner also helps ensure the climber's safety by guiding them towards the top of the route.
- Lower limb amputee: This category is for climbers who have lost one or both legs or feet. Climbers in this category use specialized prosthetics or adaptive equipment to climb. These prosthetics or adaptive equipment help the climber maintain their balance and stability while climbing. Climbers in this category also use a technique known as "heel hooking," which involves using the heel of their prosthetic foot to hook onto a hold and maintain their balance.
- Neurological impairment: This category is for climbers with neurological conditions, including cerebral palsy, multiple sclerosis, and spinal cord injuries. Depending on their specific condition, climbers may utilize adaptive equipment or rely on their upper body strength to climb
- Autism: The autism category is for climbers with autism spectrum disorder. Climbers in this category may have difficulty with sensory processing and may require additional support and accommodation. Climbers in this category require patience, understanding, and support to navigate the climbing route effectively.
- Intellectual impairment: This category is specifically designed for climbers who have intellectual disabilities. Intellectual disabilities can encompass a wide range of cognitive impairments, which may affect an individual's ability to learn, reason, problem-solve, or adapt to new situations. As a result, climbers in this category may face unique challenges while participating in paraclimbing. To ensure a supportive and inclusive environment for climbers with intellectual disabilities, additional support and accommodations may be necessary to successfully navigate the climbing route. This may include individualized coaching, tailored instructions, or the use of visual aids to help the climber understand and follow the route.
