= Spray wall =

Type of climbing equipment

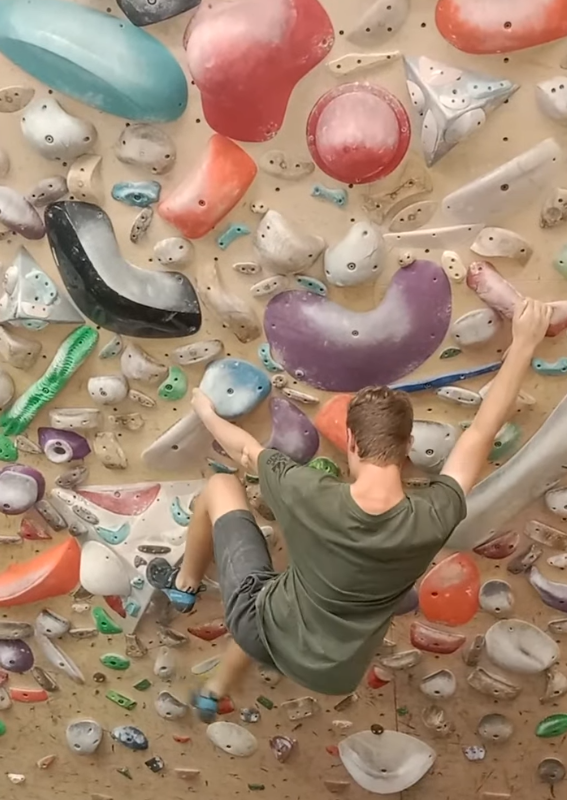
A climber on a spray wall

A spray wall is an overhanging climbing wall almost fully covered by a great variety of different sizes and shapes of climbing holds, in apparent chaotic distribution. It is used to train power, endurance and routesetting.

According to Noah Walker, author at Gripped Magazine, one of the main differences between a spray wall and a standard climbing board is that spray wall's greater hold density force climbers to develop their own problems; in particular, he states that the large grips (more frequent on spray walls than in standard boards) force to use similar three-dimensional movements and precarious heel hooks that are necessary for climbing natural walls; he insists that on a spray wall, a climber can't become as easily used to the distances between holds as with a Moon, Tension, or Kilter board.

Exercise training researchers stated that spray walls help to develop routesetting skills more than standardised training walls, because they force climbers to "observe, memorize, and mimic the problem-solving strategies and motor actions of other climbers" as in outdoor climbing.

Professional rock climber Adam Ondra considers it a better tool to develop physical strength for climbers than campus boards or pull-ups.

== See also ==
- Bachar ladder
- Campus board
- Climbing wall
- Climbing technique
- History of rock climbing
- Rock-climbing equipment
