= Climbing Works International Festival =

Annual competition bouldering event

- Abbreviation: CWIF
- Genre: Competition bouldering event
- Frequency: Annual
- Venue: The Climbing Works
- Locations: Sheffield, England
- Inaugurated: 2007
- Most recent: 2026

Climbing Works International Festival (CWIF) was an annual international competition bouldering event held at The Climbing Works in Sheffield, England, that ran from 2007 to 2026. The event featured professional and amateur climbers from around the world and was a prominent pre-season competition for athletes preparing for the World Climbing Series (previously the IFSC Climbing World Cup).

== History ==
The competition was first held in 2007 as the Climbing Works International Masters, adopting the name Climbing Works International Festival the following year. Over 19 editions, it became one of Britain's longest-running international competition bouldering events.

Notable winners included Shauna Coxsey, Erin McNeice, Hamish McArthur, Jenya Kazbekova, and Yannick Flohé. Kazbekova and Flohé won the women's and men's competitions, respectively, in 2024.

The final edition took place on 21–22 March 2026, with Coxsey winning her sixth women's title and Japan's Rei Kawamata winning the men's competition. Organizers ended the festival to pursue new competition formats, coinciding with the retirement of Climbing Works co-founder Graeme Alderson.

== Format ==
The competition featured an open qualification round comprising 30 boulder problems of varying difficulty. The top 20 men and women advanced to the semi-finals, with the six highest-ranking competitors in each category progressing to the finals. The event also included recreational climbing, team competitions, and festival activities.

== See also ==
- Competition climbing
- Pro Climbing League
