= Jenya Kazbekova =

Ukrainian competition climber

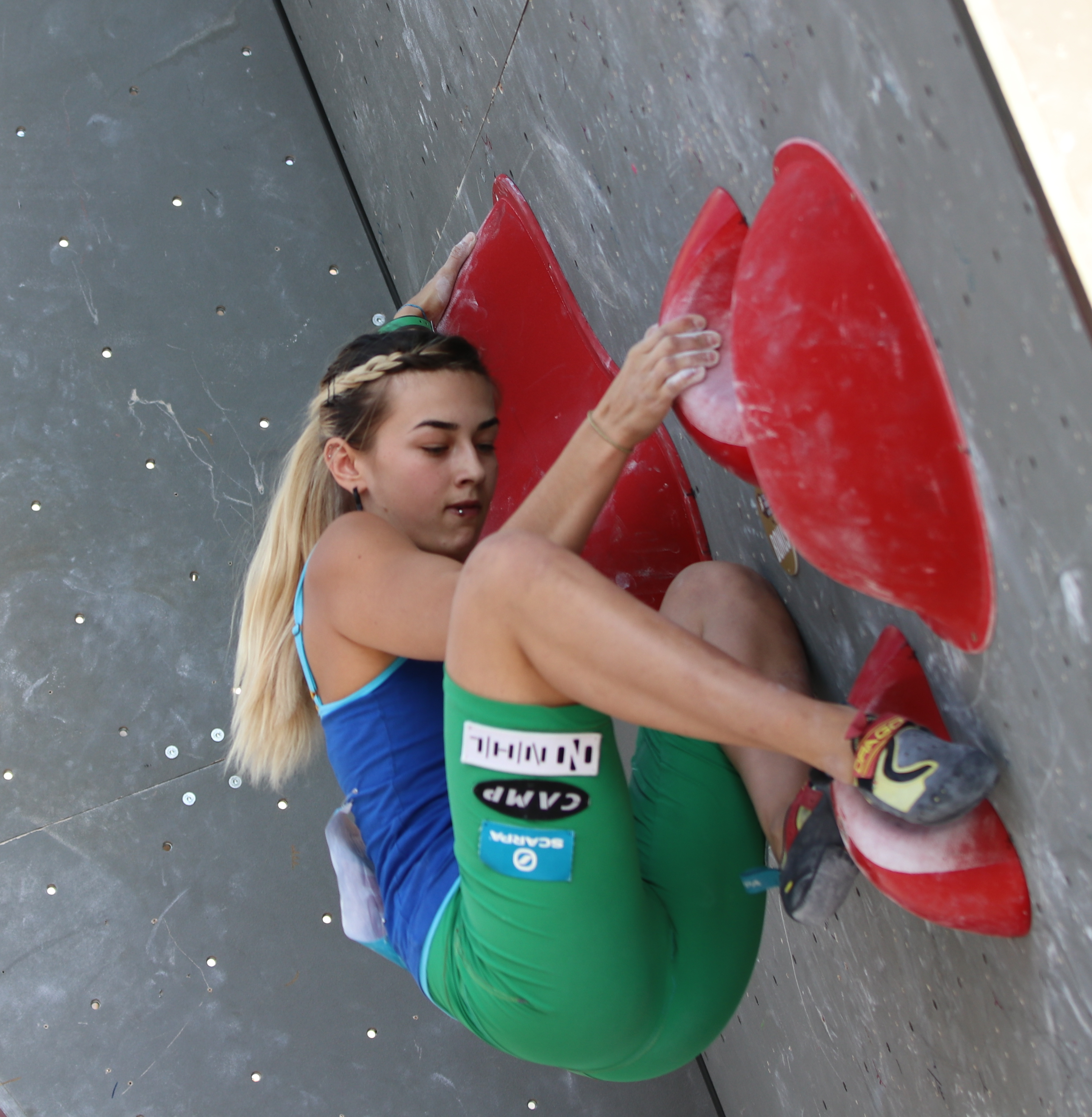
- Kazbekova at the 2017 Munich Bouldering World Cup

Personal information
- Full name: Ievgeniia Serikivna Kazbekova
- Born: 15 October 1996 (age 30) Dnipropetrovsk, Ukraine
- Occupation: Professional rock climber

Climbing career
- Type of climber: Sport climbing; Bouldering; Competition climbing
- Highest grade: Redpoint: 9a (5.14d); Bouldering: 8A+ (V12)
- Known for: 12 time Ukrainian National Champion (2012 to 2024)
Medal record
Women's competition climbing
Representing Ukraine
Youth World Championships
Gold medal – first place	2010 Edinburgh	Lead
Silver medal – second place	2011 Imst	Lead
Ukrainian National Championships
Gold medal – first place	2012-2024	Bouldering/Lead
European Championships
Silver medal – second place	2024 Villars	Lead
Silver medal – second place	2024 Villars	Combined
International Competitions
Bronze medal – third place	2026 CWIF	Bouldering
Gold medal – first place	2023 Neom	Bouldering
Bronze medal – third place	2024 Neom	Bouldering
Gold medal – first place	2024 CWIF	Bouldering
Silver medal – second place	2023 CWIF	Bouldering
Bronze medal – third place	2022 CWIF	Bouldering

Ievgeniia (Jenya) Serikivna Kazbekova (Ukrainian: Євгенія Серіківна Казбекова, born 15 October 1996) is a Ukrainian competition climber. She is a two-time European Championships silver medallist and competed in the women's combined event at the 2024 Summer Olympics in Paris.

== Family and early life ==
Kazbekova was born in 1996 in Dnipro. Her grandparents were climbers; her grandmother won the championship of the Soviet Union in a competition in Crimea, the same place where her parents, Serik Kazbekov and Natalia Perlova, met and later owned a hotel. Perlova herself was a competition climber, the Ukrainian champion, and the 2002 overall bouldering world cup winner. Her father won a silver medal in speed climbing at the 1993 UIAA Climbing World Championships in Innsbruck, Austria. Her parents regularly brought Kazbekova to competitions with them, and Perlova recalls Kazbekova already scrambling on the rocks of Crimea at the age of seven months, on family climbing trips there.

== Climbing career ==
As of 2024, Kazbekova's highest-level international competition climbing result is 2nd place in bouldering and lead at the 2024 IFSC Climbing European Championships. She is a twelve time Ukrainian National Champion in Sport Climbing and Bouldering from 2012 to 2024. Outdoors, she redpointed her first 7a+ (5.12a) graded sport climbing route at age eight, and her first 8a (5.13b) graded route at age 11. At age 13, she climbed 8b+ "Parallel’niy mir" in Crimea. She has climbed the 8A+ (V12) graded bouldering problem called Partage in Fontainebleau in France, the 8c+ (5.14c) sport climbing route Pati Naso in Siurana in Spain, and the 8c+ (5.14c) graded sport route Güllich at the Redstone crag in Crimea (and as the first female free ascent) in 2017.

Kazbekova was one of the contenders for a place in sport climbing at the 2020 Summer Olympics, but fell short after a knee injury and illness prevented her from showing her best. Through competing in the 2024 Olympic Qualifier Series in Shanghai and Budapest, Kazbekova came in 6th place out of the top 48 women competing in the series to gain a spot at the sport climbing at the 2024 Summer Olympics. At the Olympics, she placed 14th in both the bouldering and lead semifinals of the combined event. Kazbekova won the silver medal in the lead and the combined event at the 2024 European Championships in Villars.

In March 2026 she competed in the final CWIF (Climbing Works International Festival) competition, finishing in third place.

== Personal life ==
In early 2022, due to the Russian invasion of Ukraine escalating the ongoing Russo-Ukrainian War, Kazbekova, her parents, and younger sister Rafael Kazbekova (herself a competition climber) fled Kyiv for Germany. She has continued to be a prominent and staunch advocate for Ukrainian interests in the climbing world. In part in response to her efforts, in 2022, the International Federation of Sport Climbing (IFSC) cancelled several events scheduled to be held in Russia, and suspended all Russian athletes from their competitions. Kazbekova's family later moved to Manchester, England. As of 2024, Kazbekova is primarily based in Salt Lake City in the US, where the US climbing team trains.

Kazbekova gave birth to her first child in mid 2025.

== Notable climbs ==
- Dreamcatcher (9a) - Squamish - October 2026
- Necessary Evil (8c+) - Virgin River Gorge - December 2025
- Güllich (8c+) - Red Stone, Crimea - 2017
- Pati Noso (8c/c+)
