= Indiana State University Recreational Center =

Student Rec Center
- Artist's drawing of the Rec Center
- Interactive map of the Student Rec Center area

General information
- Location: Terre Haute, Indiana
- Coordinates: 39.474002°N 87.409146°W
- Construction started: August 2007
- Completed: Autumn 2009 (planned)
- Cost: $24 million
- Owner: Indiana State University

Technical details
- Floor area: 107,000 sq. ft.

Design and construction
- Architecture firm: Hastings & Chivetta Architects, Inc.

The Student Rec Center at Indiana State University is a building nearing completion on Indiana State's campus in Terre Haute, Indiana.

The rec center will include a three-court gymnasium and a multi-activity court with a durable surface suitable for such activities as soccer and roller hockey. Plans also call for a leisure aquatics facility, jogging track, climbing wall, fitness center, spinning room, two multi-purpose rooms, student lounge, juice bar, and outdoor recreation yard.
