= Pro Climbing League =

Rock climbing league

- Genre: Bouldering
- Location: Europe
- Inaugurated: 2026
- Founders: Danaan Markey; Charlie Boscoe
- Website: https://www.proclimbing.com/

The Pro Climbing League (PCL) is a professional competition bouldering league. It was founded in 2020 by climbers Danaan Markey and Charlie Boscoe and held its inaugural event on February 28, 2026, in London. The league uses a "head-to-head" competition format, where two climbers attempt identical boulder problems at the same time. Co-founder Danaan Markey stated the format is intended to increase pressure and excitement, and "reward creativity and intuition just as much as raw strength". The league is scheduled to return for a second season in 2027.

The format is distinct from competition bouldering events organized by World Climbing or at the Summer Olympics, where athletes individually attempt multiple boulders, and the winner is determined by total boulders completed or partially completed and number of attempts. French magazine Planet Grimpe noted that the head-to-head format is intended to be more straightforward for a general audience, and easier to broadcast on television. Events are broadcast by Red Bull TV.

== Editions ==
=== 2026: London ===
During the PCL's first event at Magazine London, 16 athletes, eight per gender, competed in a three-stage knockout bracket. Of the 16 competitors, 14 were directly invited and one man and one woman qualified via a wildcard event held at The Font Wandsworth gym in London. Each gender had quarterfinals, semifinals, and finals. In quarterfinals, winners were decided in a best-of-three round, semifinals were decided on one boulder and the finals were contested on two boulder problems.

=== 2027 tour ===
The 2027 PCL season features 24 athletes, 12 per gender. Reigning champions Max Milne and Oriane Bertone are confirmed to return. Of the remaining 22, 14 are invited directly and eight will qualify through wildcard events. The PCL season is scheduled to tour through Berlin, Paris and London, on 22–23 January, 12–13 February, and 19–20 March respectively. While the standard head-to-head format for PCL remains the same, the 2027 season introduces a new qualification and bracket system.

- Group stage: For each gender, the 12 athletes are divided into three groups of four. Within the groups, athletes compete against each other in head-to-head duels. The winners from each group advance to the semifinal round in the evening. Additionally, the strongest runner-up across all groups takes the fourth spot in the semifinals.
- Semifinals: The three group stage winners and the runner-up from the morning group stage compete in a best-of-three round with the winners advancing to the big final. The losers from the semifinal will compete in the small final for third place.
- Finals: The big final is decided in the same best-of-three format as semifinals. In the small final, the athletes compete in a single-boulder round for third place.

== Rules ==
=== Scoring ===
Erin McNeice celebrates after topping a boulder at PCL London

Within each round, two identical boulders are set on side-by-side walls. On each boulder problem, the climbing holds are numbered sequentially according to the intended route progression, with the top hold awarded the highest number. In a head-to-head duel, the two climbers have four minutes to attempt their boulder. If a climber leaves the ground within the time limit, they are allowed to finish the attempt. The first climber to control the top hold with both hands wins that boulder. If neither climber reaches the top, the climber who controlled the highest-numbered hold wins. Ties are broken by whoever controlled the highest-numbered hold first.

=== Wildcard qualifications ===
The PCL has partnered with over 80 gyms across the United States, France, Germany, and the United Kingdom. These gyms host grassroots feeder competitions that will result in regional finals for each country. The two winners (one per gender) of each country's final will receive an invitation to the full PCL season. Across all countries, eight wildcard athletes will receive invitations.

== Results ==
=== Summary ===
Pro Climbing League event results
Year	Event	Date	Division	Gold	Silver	Bronze
2026	(United Kingdom) London	28 February 2026	Men	Max Milne (GBR)	Colin Duffy (USA)	Tomoa Narasaki (JPN)
2026	(United Kingdom) London	28 February 2026	Women	Oriane Bertone (FRA)	Janja Garnbret (SLO)	Annie Sanders (USA)

=== 2026 London athletes and results ===
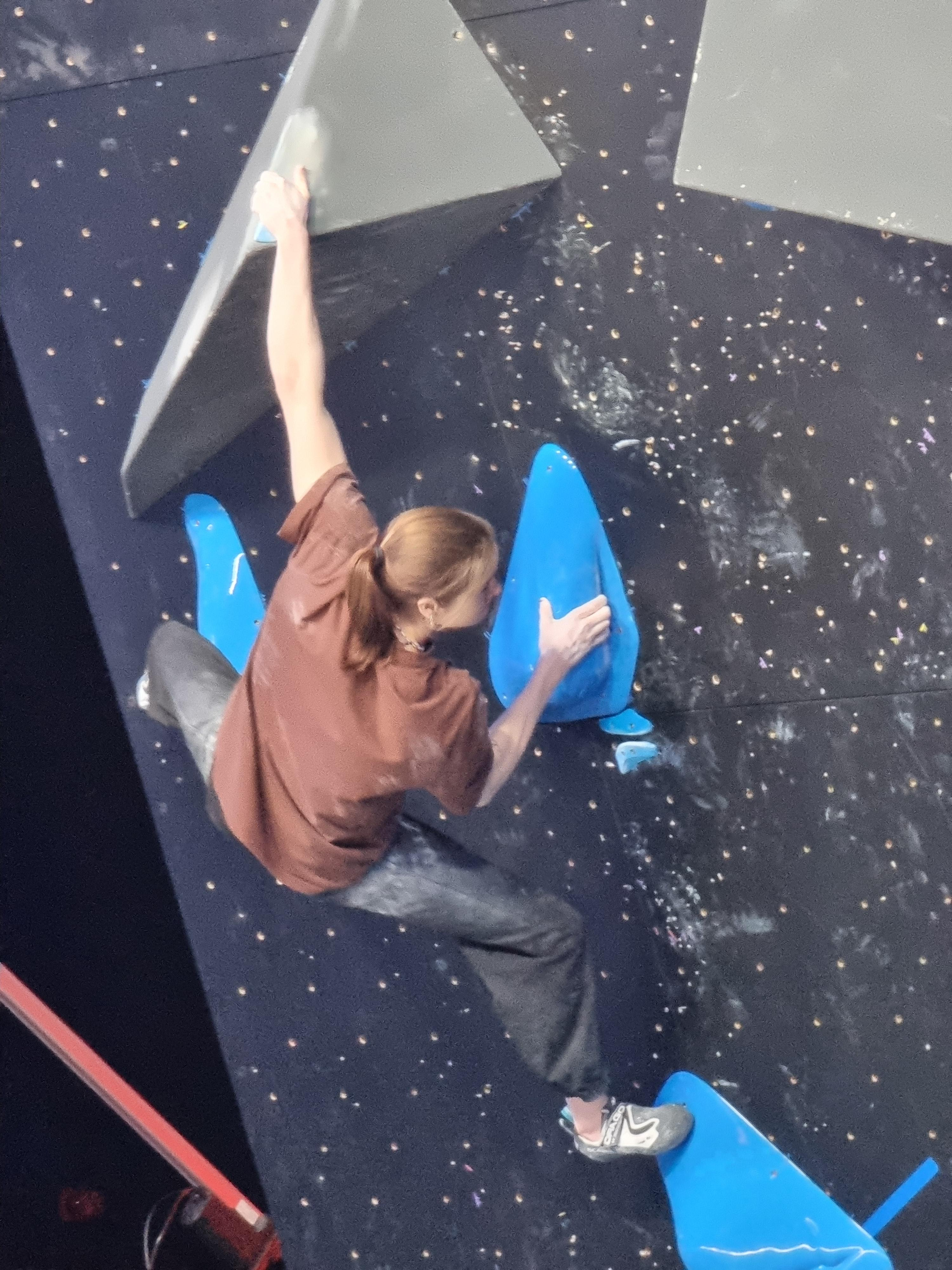
Erin McNeice at PCL London

Male division
Athlete	Qualification method
(United Kingdom) Toby Roberts	Invited
(Japan) Tomoa Narasaki	Invited
(France) Mejdi Schalck	Invited
(Germany) Yannick Flohé	Invited
(France) Mickaël Mawem	Invited
(United States) Colin Duffy	Invited
(Romania) Darius Râpă	Invited
(United Kingdom) Max Milne	London Wildcard

Female division
Athlete	Qualification method
(Slovenia) Janja Garnbret	Invited
(United Kingdom) Erin McNeice	Invited
(United States) Annie Sanders	Invited
(Italy) Camilla Moroni	Invited
(Japan) Anon Matsufuji	Invited
(Germany) Lucia Dörffel	Invited
(France) Oriane Bertone	Invited
(United Kingdom) Jennifer Buckley	London Wildcard

== See also ==
- IFSC Climbing World Cup
- IFSC Climbing World Championships
- Sport climbing at the Summer Olympics
