= Suquamish =

The Suquamish are a Coast Salish people and a federally recognized tribe in the U.S. state of Washington:

- Suquamish people
- Suquamish Indian Tribe, a federally recognized tribe of Suquamish people

Suquamish may also refer to:

- Suquamish, Washington, a census-designated place in Washington state
- Suquamish (motor vessel), a diesel-engined passenger vessel built in 1914
- MV Suquamish, a ferry vessel built in 2018

== See also ==
- Squamish (disambiguation)
