= Climbing wall =

Artificial rock climbing wall

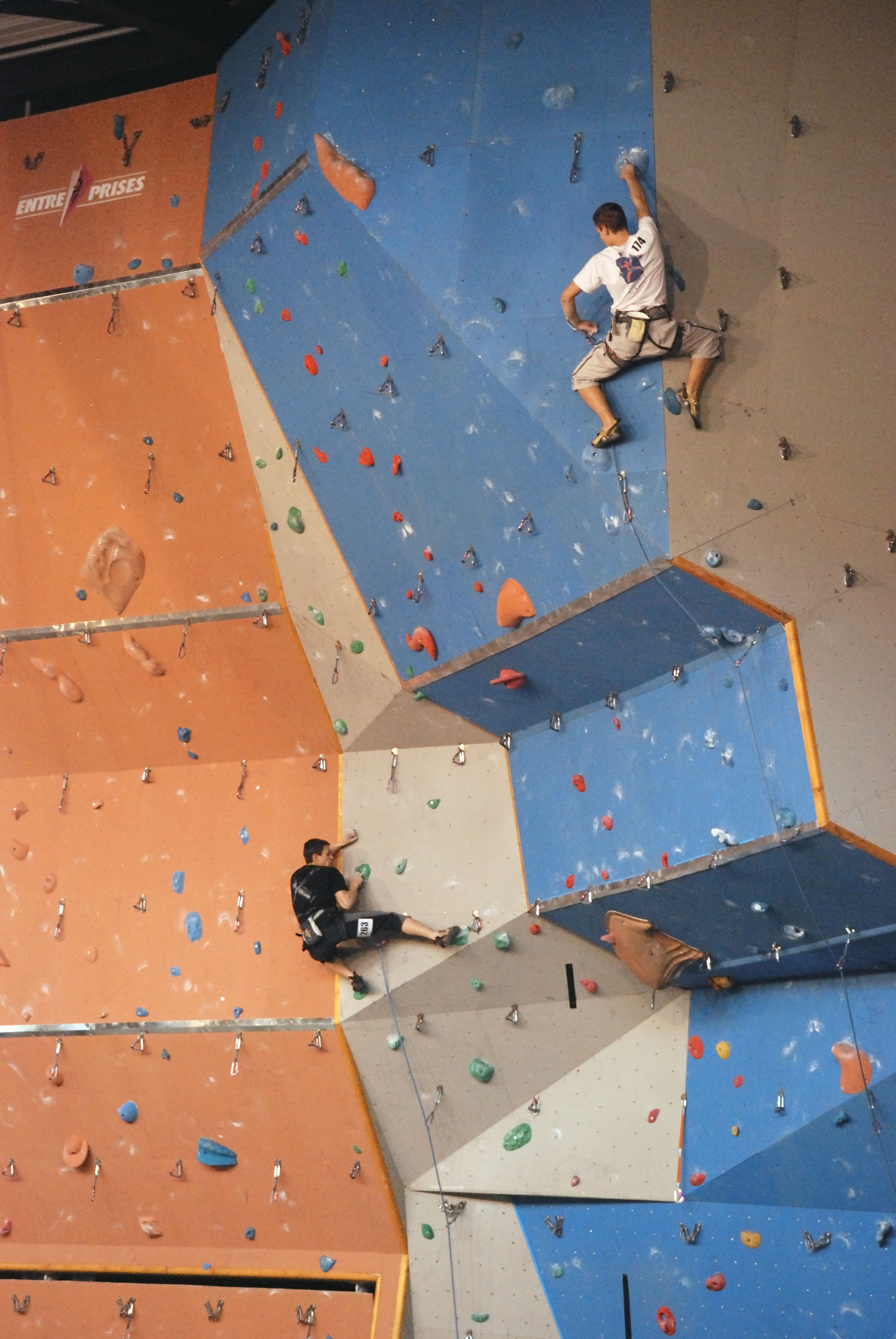
Climbing wall

A climbing wall is an artificially constructed wall with manufactured grips (or "holds") for the hands and feet. Most walls are located indoors, and climbing on such walls is often termed indoor climbing. Some walls are brick or wooden constructions but on modern walls, the material most often used is a thick multiplex board with holes drilled into it. Recently, manufactured steel and aluminum have also been used. The wall may have places to attach belay ropes, but may also be used to practice lead climbing or bouldering.

A man using a climbing wall in Japan

Each hole contains a specially formed t-nut to allow modular climbing holds to be screwed onto the wall. With manufactured steel or aluminum walls, an engineered industrial fastener is used to secure climbing holds. The face of the multiplex board climbing surface is covered with textured products including concrete and paint or polyurethane loaded with sand. In addition to the textured surface and hand holds the wall may contain surface structures such as indentions (in cuts) and protrusions (bulges), or take the form of an overhang, underhang or crack. Some grips or handholds are formed to mimic the conditions of outdoor rock, including some that are oversized and can have other grips bolted onto them.

== History ==
The earliest artificial climbing walls were typically small concrete faces with protrusions made of medium-sized rocks for hand holds. Schurman Rock in Seattle, WA is believed by some to be the first artificial climbing structure in the United States, constructed in 1939.

The first artificial climbing wall in the world seems to be the wall commissioned by the King of Belgium Leopold III in 1937 near his palace. This was documented by Mark Sebille in his book Bel'Wall.

The modern artificial climbing wall began in the UK. The first wall was created in 1964 by Don Robinson, a lecturer in Physical Education at the University of Leeds, by inserting pieces of rock into a corridor wall. The first commercial wall in the UK, The Foundry Climbing Centre, was built in Sheffield in 1991, traditionally England's centre for climbing due to its proximity to the Peak District.

== Types ==
Different types of sport climbing problems: (1) Dihedral, (2) Slab, (3) Wall, (4) Overhang, (5) Edge, (6) Roof and (7) Traverse climbing

The simplest type of wall is of plywood construction, known colloquially in the climbing community as a "woody", with a combination of either bolt-on holds or screw-on holds. Bolt-on holds are fixed to a wall with bolts that are inserted through the hold, which will have specific bolt points, and then fixed into pre-allocated screw-threaded holes in the wall. Screw-on holds are, by contrast, usually much smaller, owing to the nature of their fixing. These holds are connected to the wall by screws, which may be fastened anywhere on the wall's surface.

Some other types of walls include slabs of granite, concrete sprayed onto a wire mesh, pre-made fiberglass panels, large trees, manufactured steel and aluminum panels, textured fiberglass walls, and inflatables. A newer innovation is the rotating climbing wall: a mechanical, mobile wall that rotates like a treadmill to match one's climbing rate of ascent (such as the Treadwall).

The most common construction method involves bolting resin hand and foot holds onto wooden boards. The boards can be of varying height & steepness (from completely horizontal "roofs" to near-vertical "slabs") with a mixture of holds attached. These can vary from very small "crimps" and "pinches", and slanted-surfaced "slopers", to "jugs", which are often large and easy to hold. This variety, coupled with the ability for the climbs to be changed by moving the holds to new positions on the wall, has resulted in indoor climbing becoming a very popular sport.

=== Spray wall ===
A spray wall is an overhanging climbing wall almost fully covered by a great variety of different sizes and shapes of climbing holds, in apparent chaotic distribution. It is used to train power, endurance and routesetting.

== Equipment ==
Proper climbing equipment must be used during indoor climbing. Most climbing gyms lend harnesses, ropes and belay devices. Some also lend climbing shoes and chalk bags. Some climbing gyms require use of chalk balls (as opposed to loose chalk) to reduce chalk dust in the air and chalk spills when a chalk bag is tipped over or stepped on. Reducing chalk in the air helps to avoid clogging ventilation systems and reduces the dust that accumulates on less-than-vertical surfaces.

== Indoor climbing ==
Indoor climbing is an increasingly popular form of rock climbing performed on artificial structures that attempt to mimic the experience of outdoor rock.

The first indoor climbing walls tended to be made primarily of brick, which limited the steepness of the wall and variety of the hand holds. More recently, indoor climbing terrain is constructed of plywood over a metal frame, with bolted-on plastic hand and footholds, and sometimes spray-coated with texture to simulate a rock face.

Most climbing competitions are held in climbing gyms, making them a part of indoor climbing.

=== History ===
Terres Neuves, the first indoor climbing gym in the world, was opened in Brussels, Belgium on May 16, 1987, by Isabelle Dorsimond and Marc Bott. The gym used climbing walls produced in Brussels by Alpi-in, the first commercial manufacturer of artificial climbing walls. The concept for the walls, consisting of pre-drilled plywood fitted with T-nuts, was invented by Pierre d'Haenens for Alpi-in a year prior, and it is still used worldwide by all climbing wall manufacturers. As of 2019, Terres Neuves still exists in a nearly unchanged form.

The first indoor climbing gym in North America, Vertical World in Seattle, began to sell memberships in late October 1987.

=== Compared to outdoor climbing ===
Indoor and outdoor climbing can differ in techniques, style, and equipment. Climbing artificial walls, especially indoors, is much safer because anchor points and holds are able to be more firmly fixed, and environmental conditions can be controlled. During indoor climbing, holds are easily visible in contrast with natural walls where finding a good hold or foothold may be a challenge. Climbers on artificial walls are somewhat restricted to the holds prepared by the route setter, whereas on natural walls they can use every slope or crack in the surface of the wall. Some typical rock formations can be difficult to emulate on climbing walls.

== Routes and grading ==
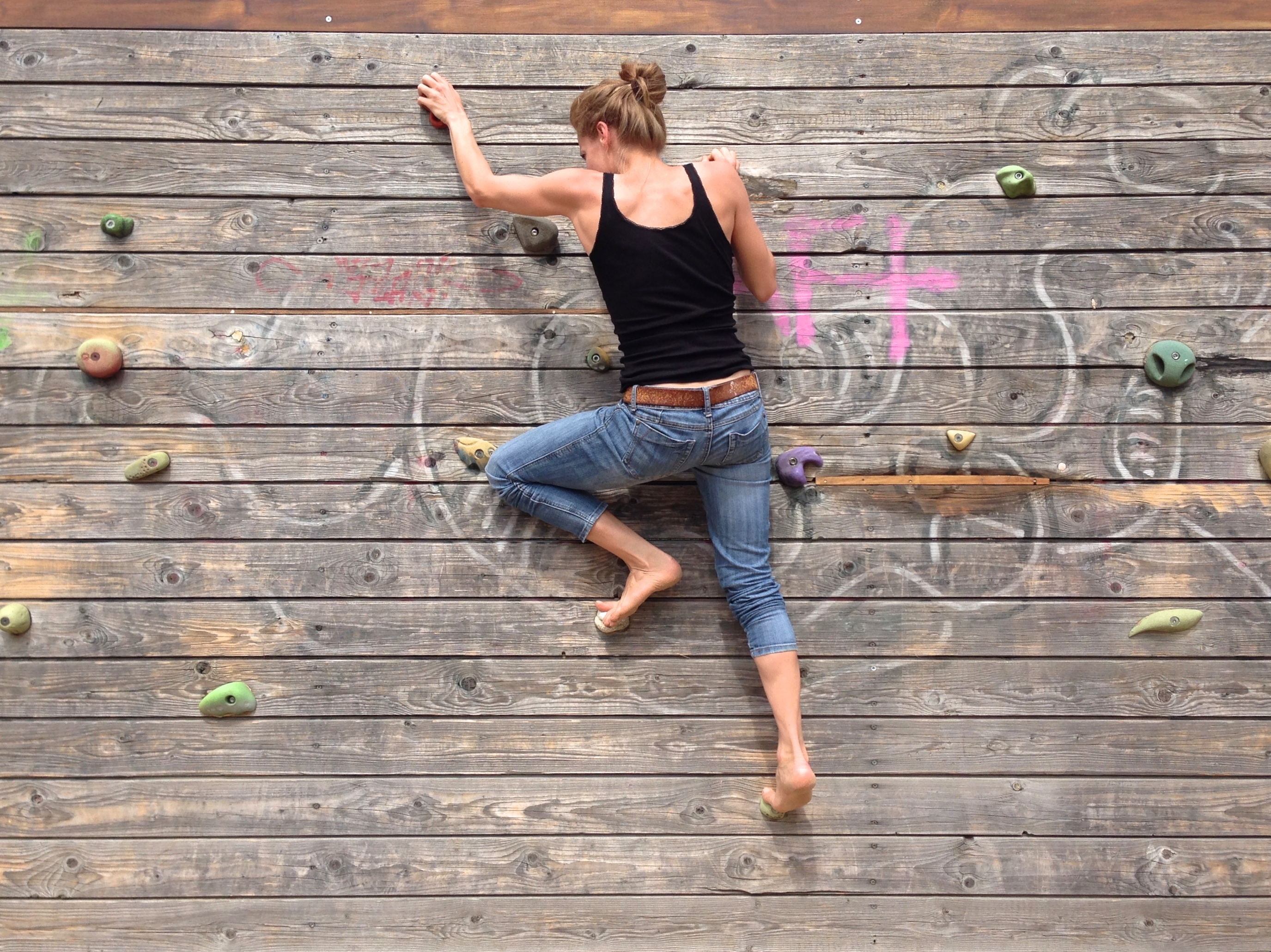
Boulder Dash

Holds come in different colours, those of the same colour often being used to denote a route, allowing routes of different difficulty levels to be overlaid on one another. Coloured tape placed under climbing holds is another way that is often used to mark different climbing routes. In attempting a given route, a climber is only allowed to use grips of the designated colour as handholds. However, the climber is usually allowed to use both handholds and footholds of the designated colour and surface structures and textures of the "rockface" as footholds.

The grade (difficulty) of the route is usually a consensus decision between the setter of the route and the first few people who climb the route. Many indoor climbing walls have people called route setters or course setters who are assigned to set these different climbing routes. As indoor climbing walls are often used to check the development of climbers' abilities, climbs are color-coded. Indoor climbing gyms often use internationally recognized grading systems in order to reflect the estimated grade that the route would be if it was an outdoor route, but may also have their own grading system for convenience's and simplicity's sake.

== Route setting ==
Route setting is the design of routes by placing climbing holds in a strategic, technical, and fun way that sets how the route will flow. There are many different techniques involved with setting, and up to 5 levels of certifications are awarded to those qualified. Route setting can be defined as the backbone of indoor climbing; without a great set of routes, a gym cannot easily hope to keep a good hoard of climbers.

== Gallery ==
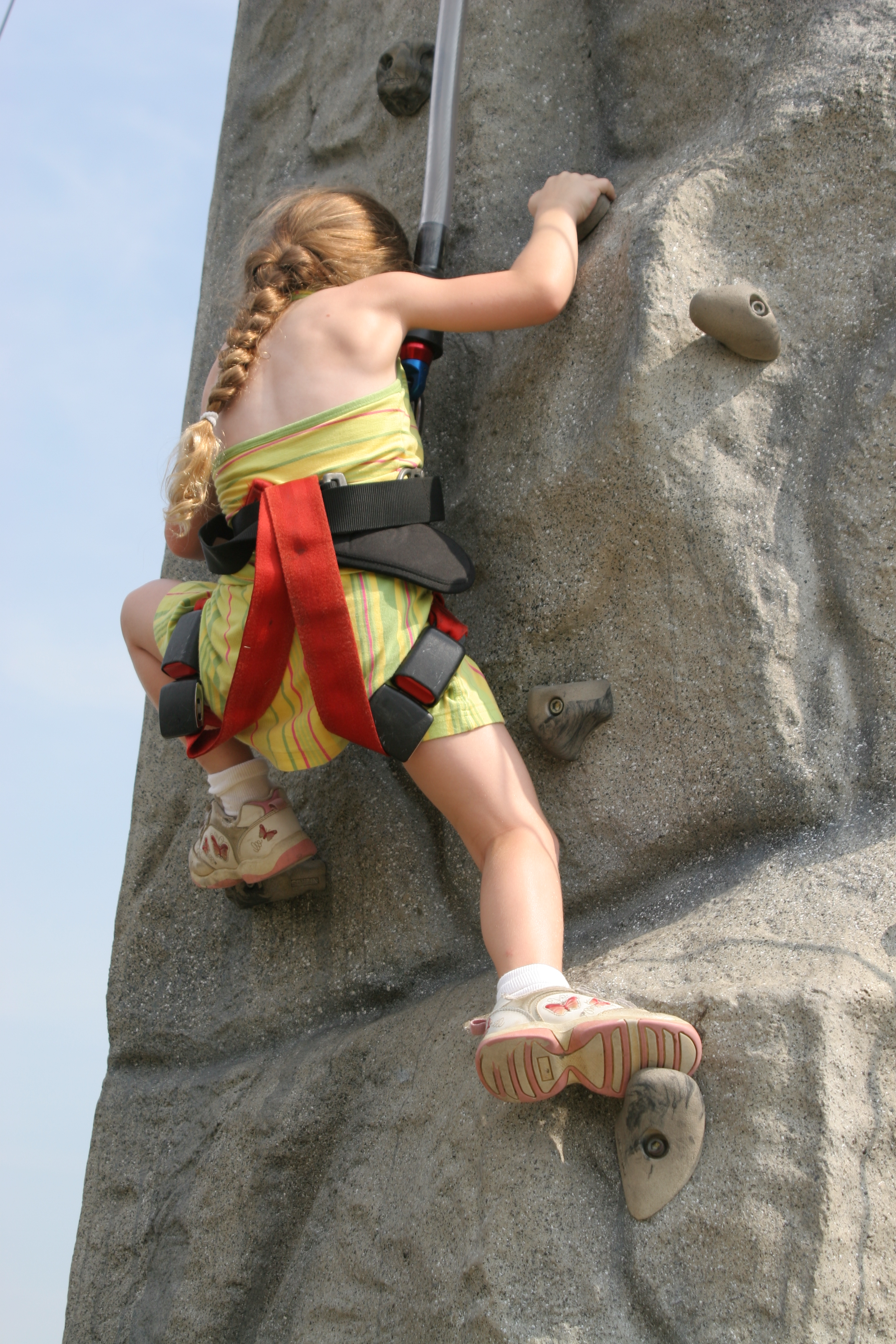
Climbing a rock-textured wall with belay, modular hand holds, incuts, and protrusions

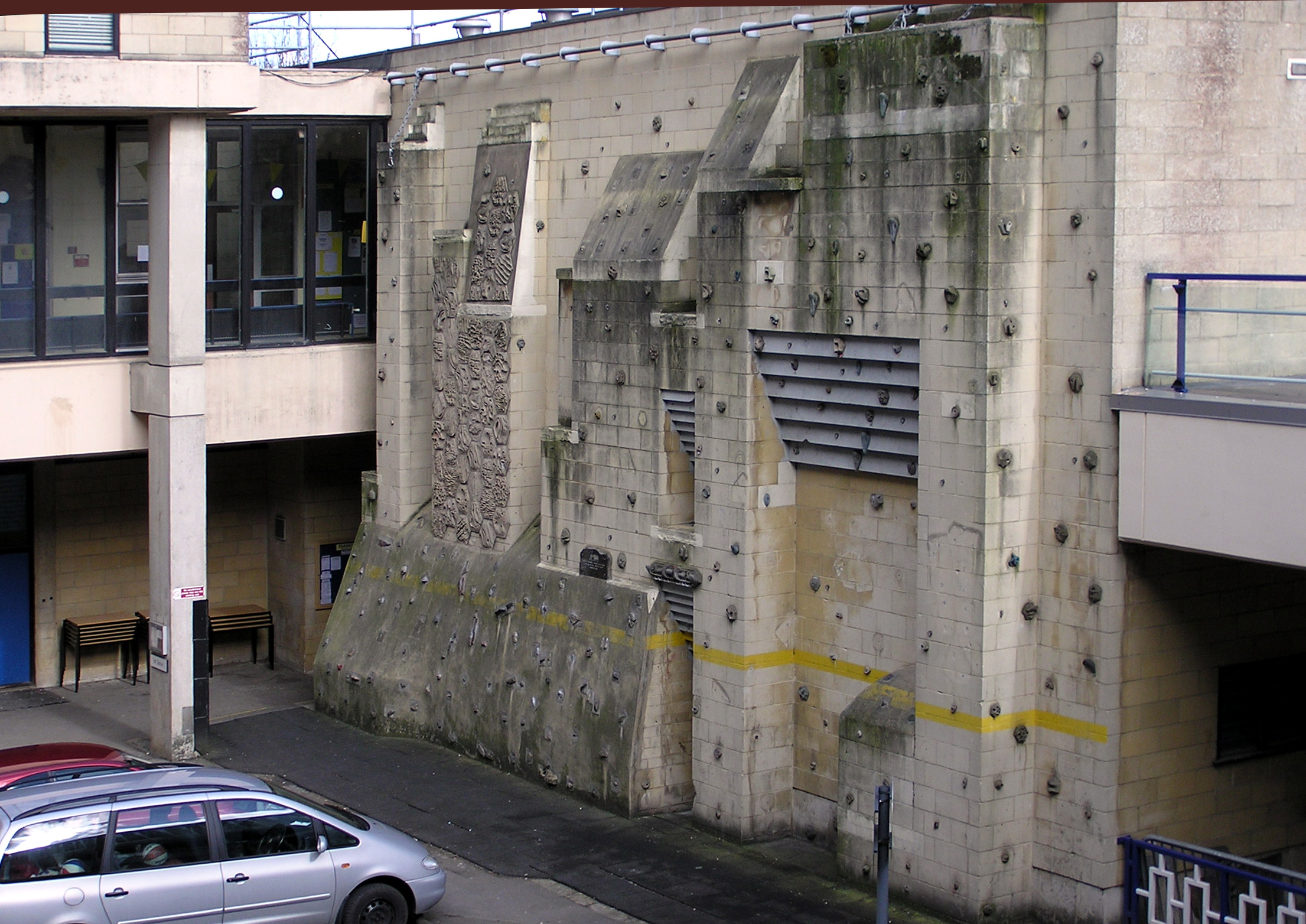
An outdoor climbing wall at the University of Bath, England

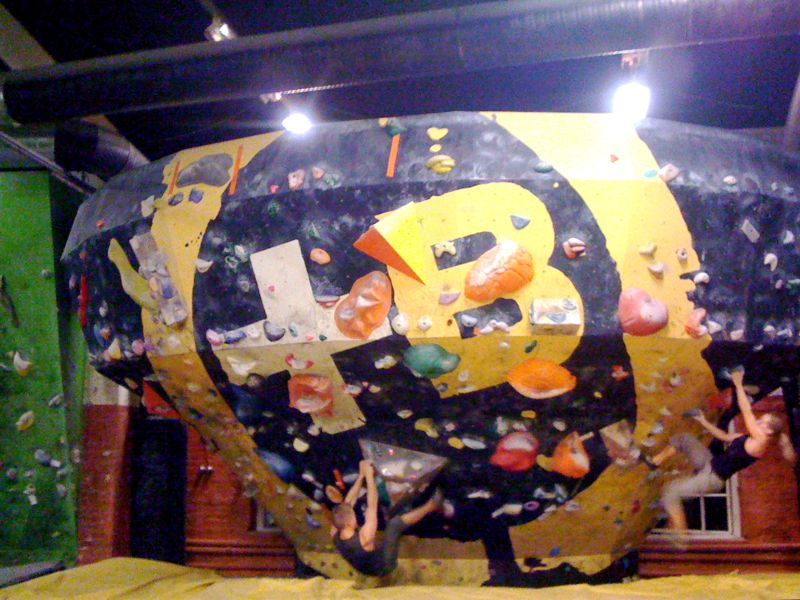
Bouldering at an indoors bouldering centre in Pasila, Helsinki, Finland

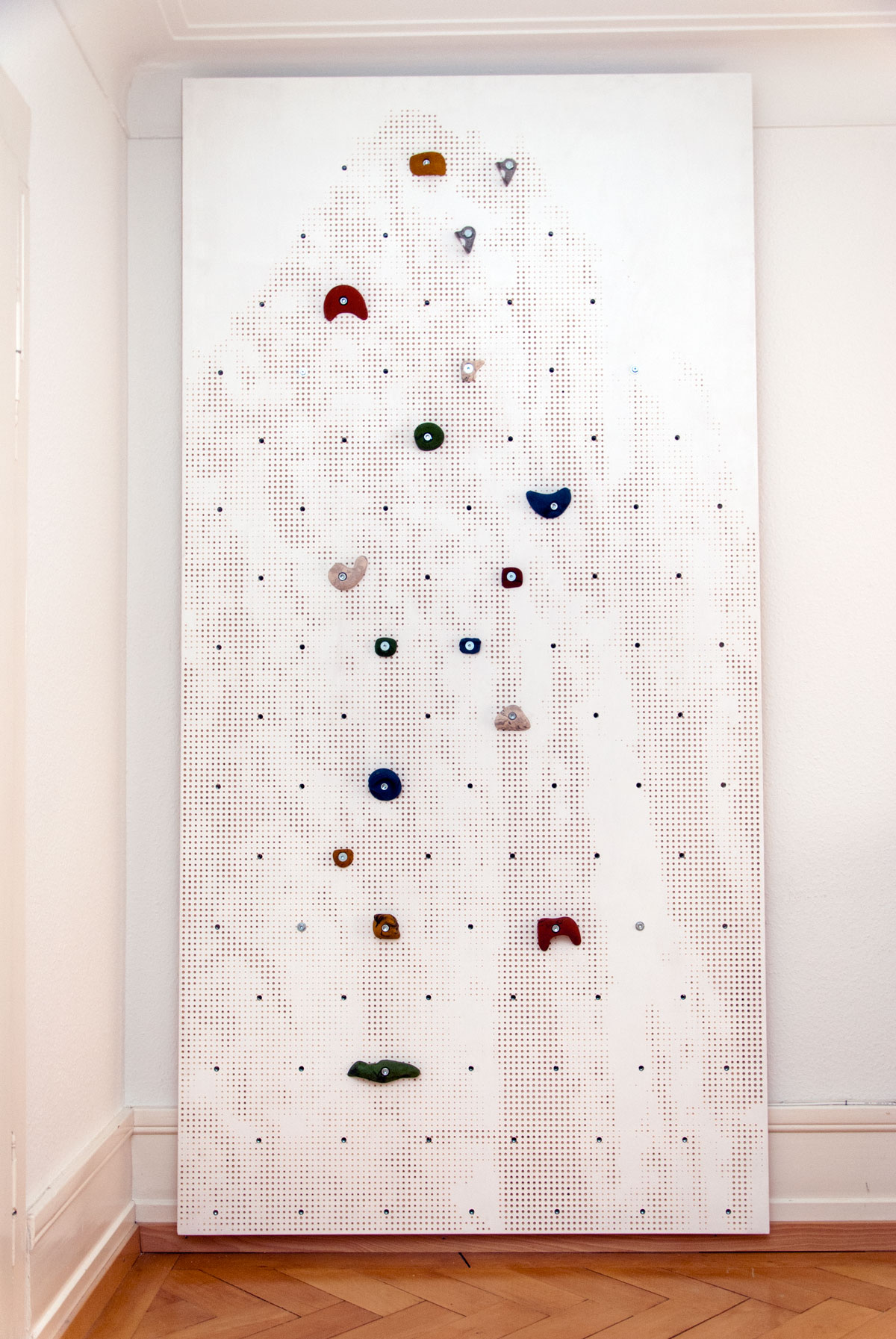
A DIY climbing wall with a hole pattern that replicates Fitz Roy's famous peak

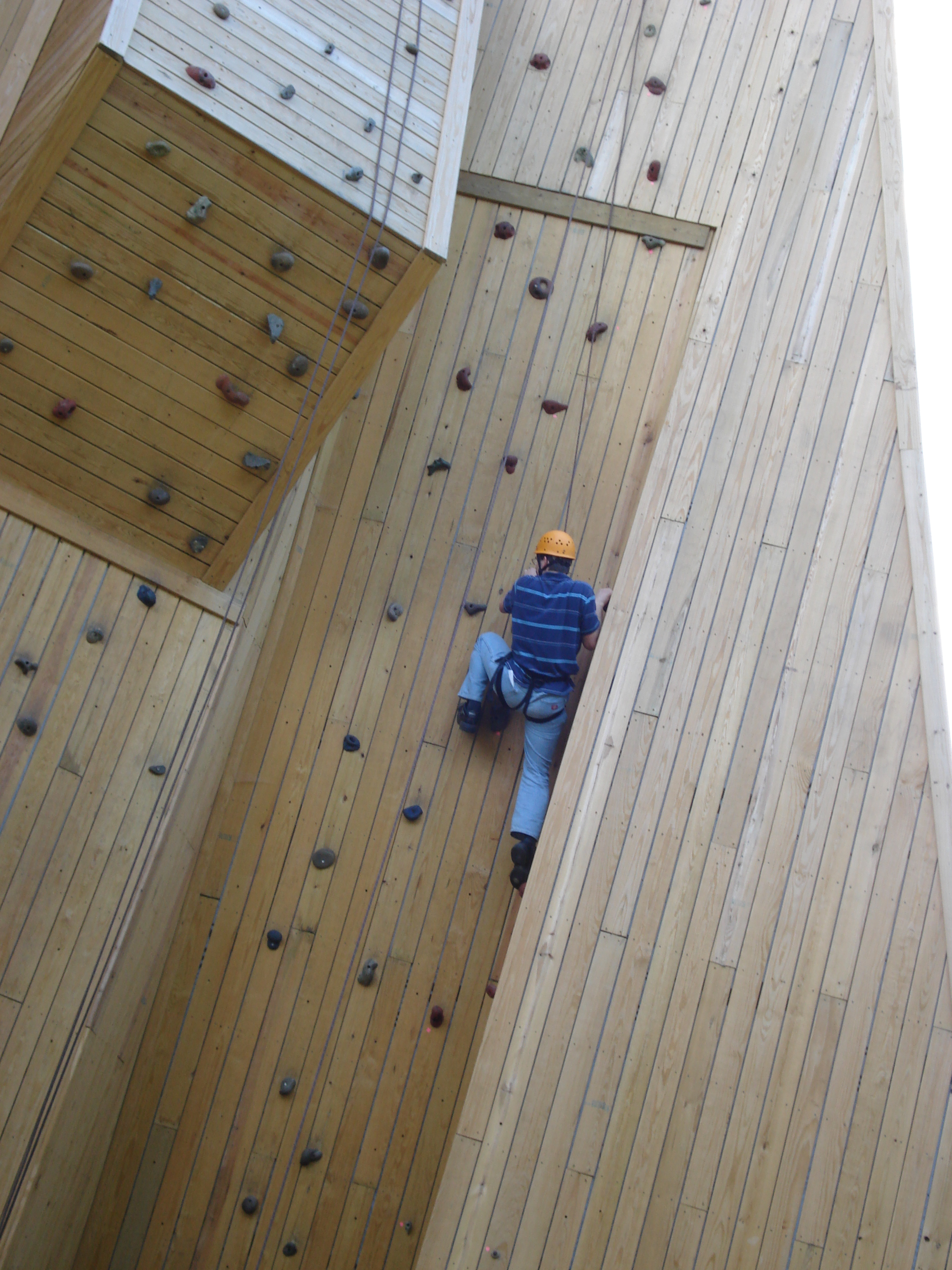
Wood climbing wall

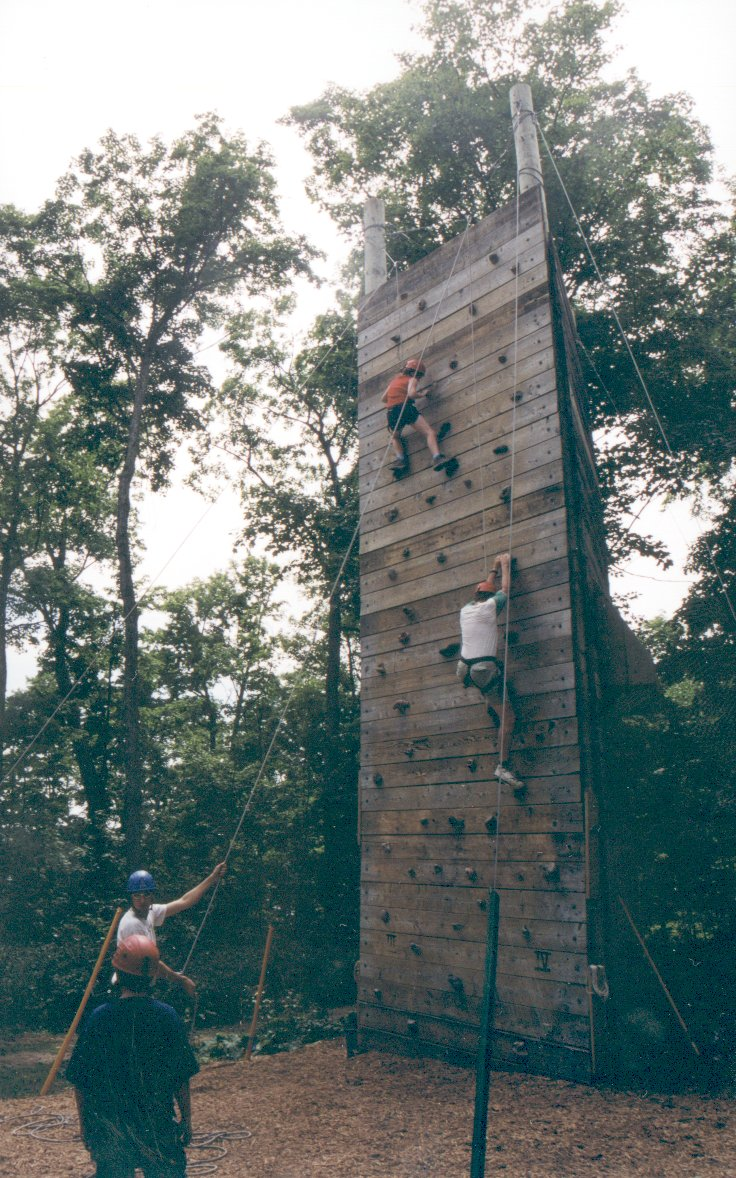
Two Scouts climb an outdoor climbing wall at Haliburton Scout Reserve, Ontario, Canada

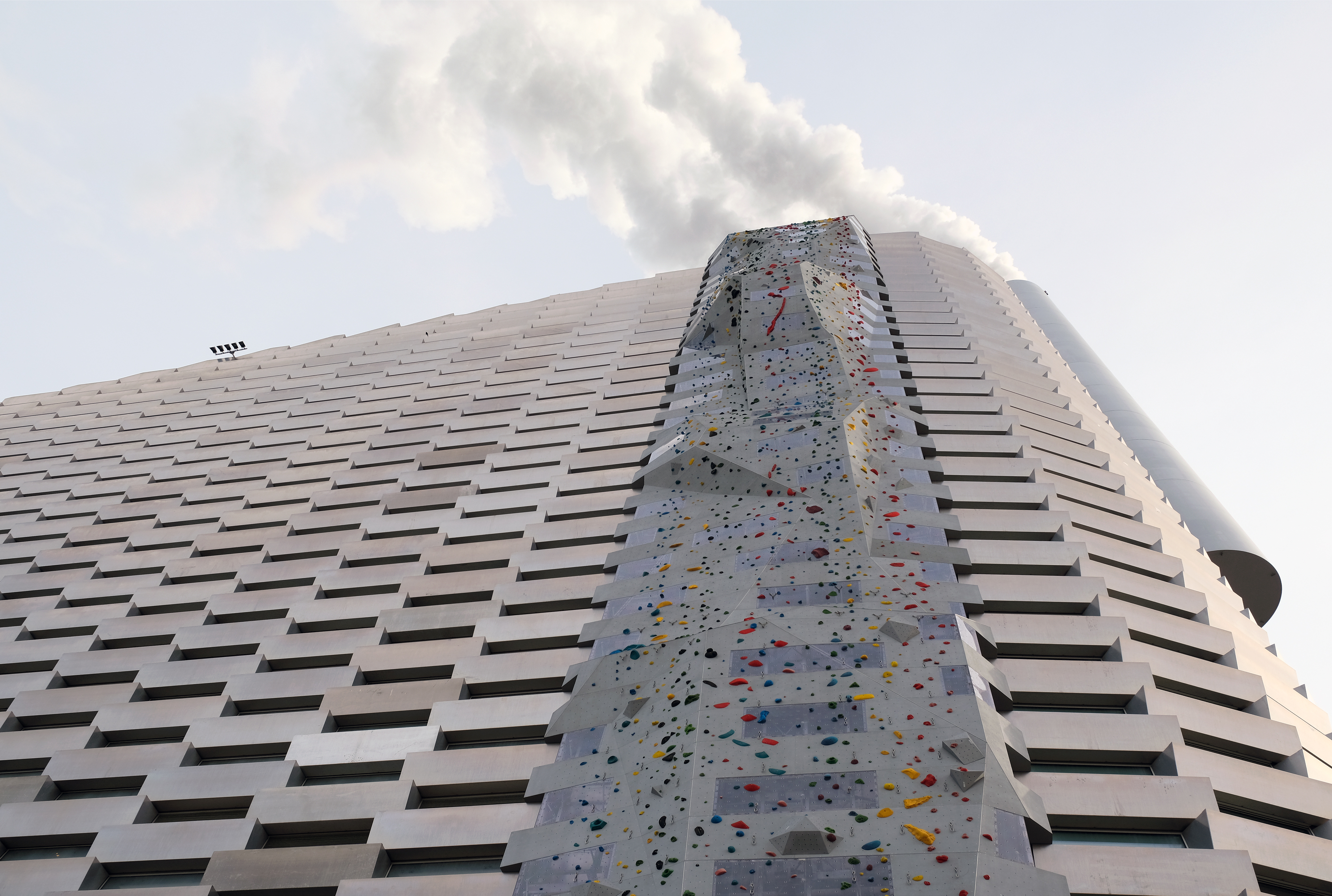
Amager Bakke, Copenhagen: the world's tallest climbing wall at 85 meters.

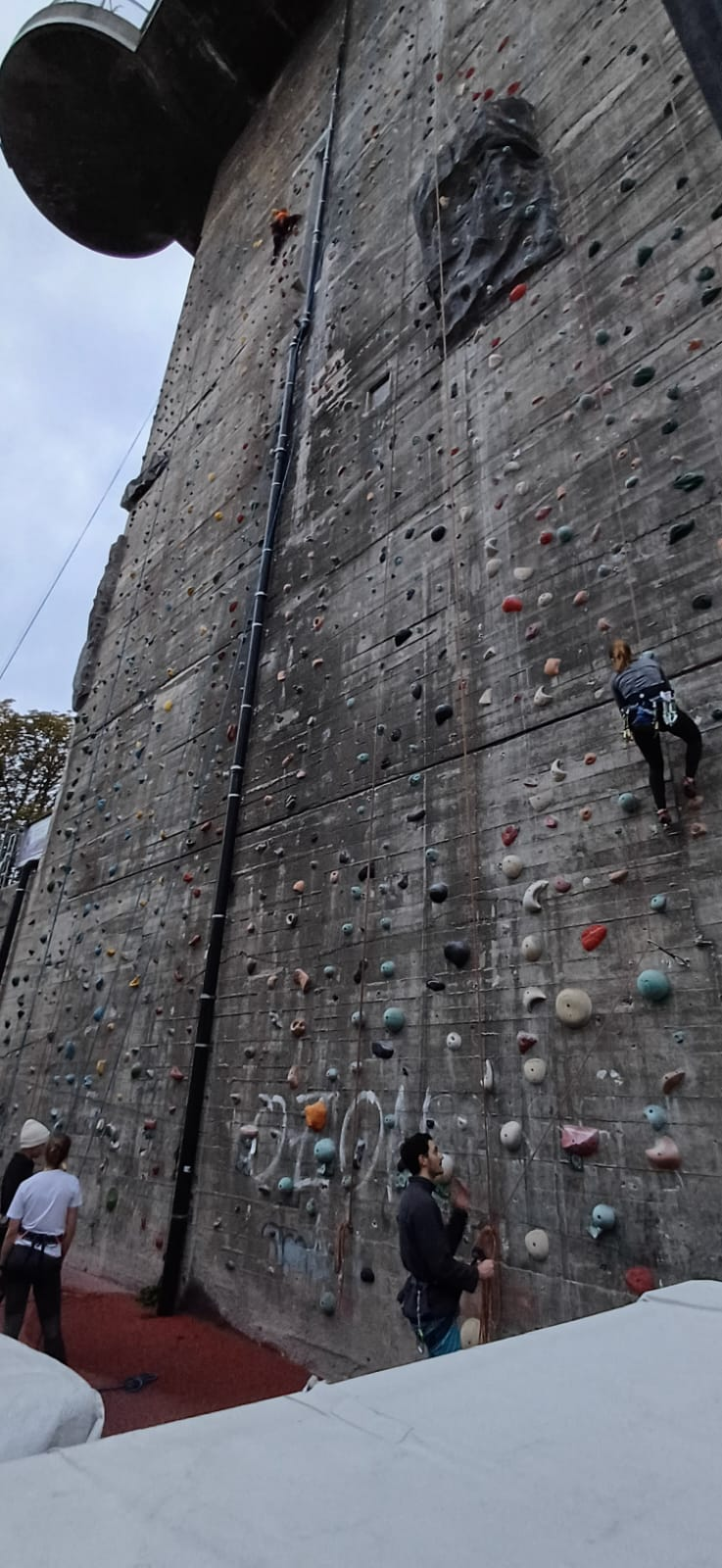
Climbing the wall at Haus des Meeres in Vienna, Austria.

== See also ==
- Climbing
- Climbing gym
- Speed climbing wall
- Rock-climbing equipment
