= Face climbing =

Type of rock climbing route

Examples of face climbing
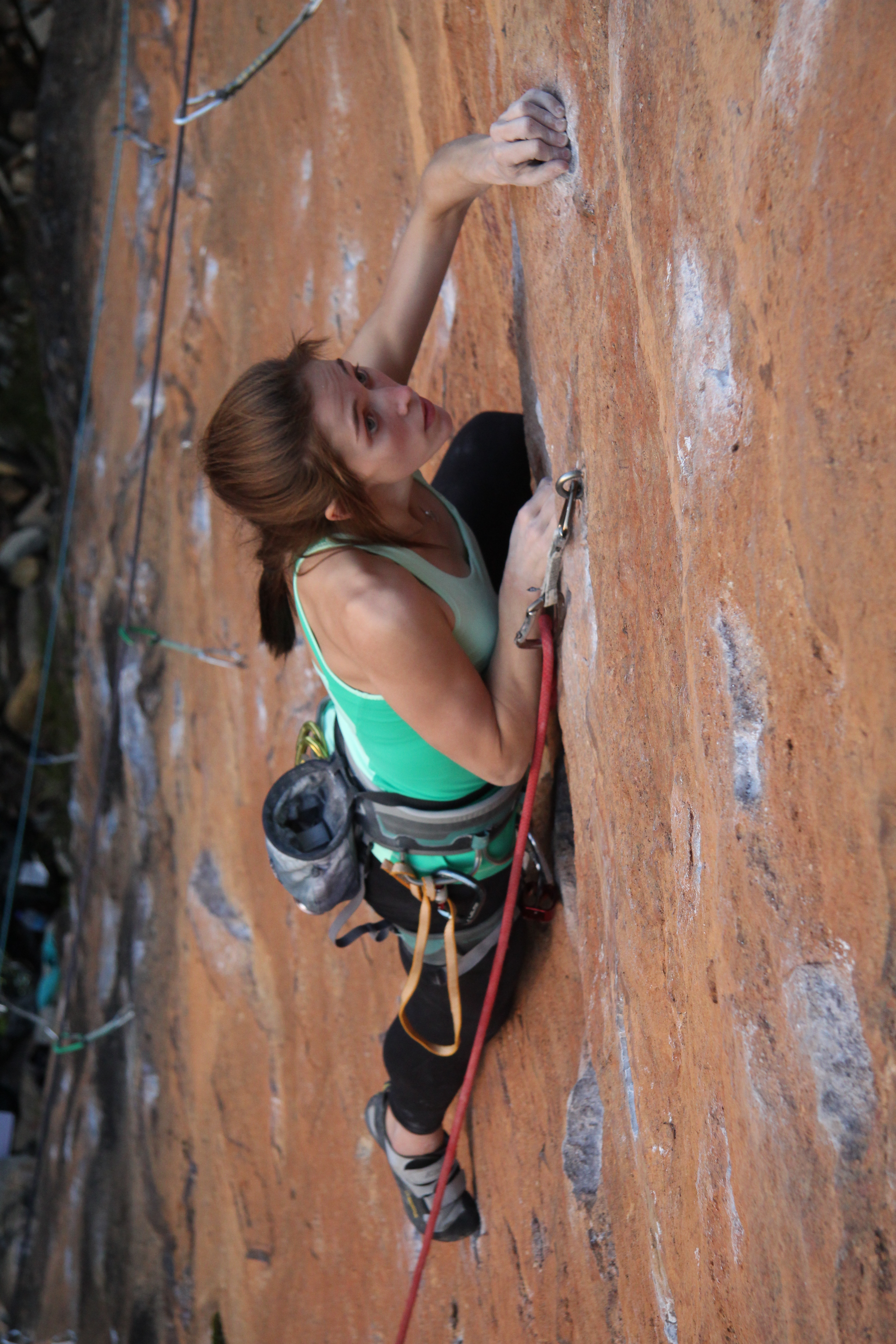
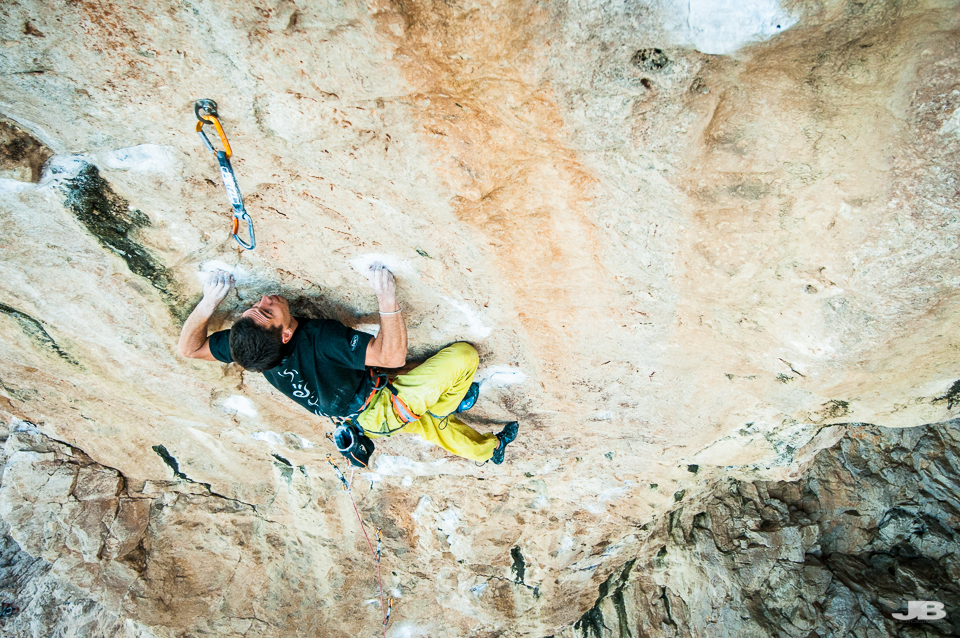
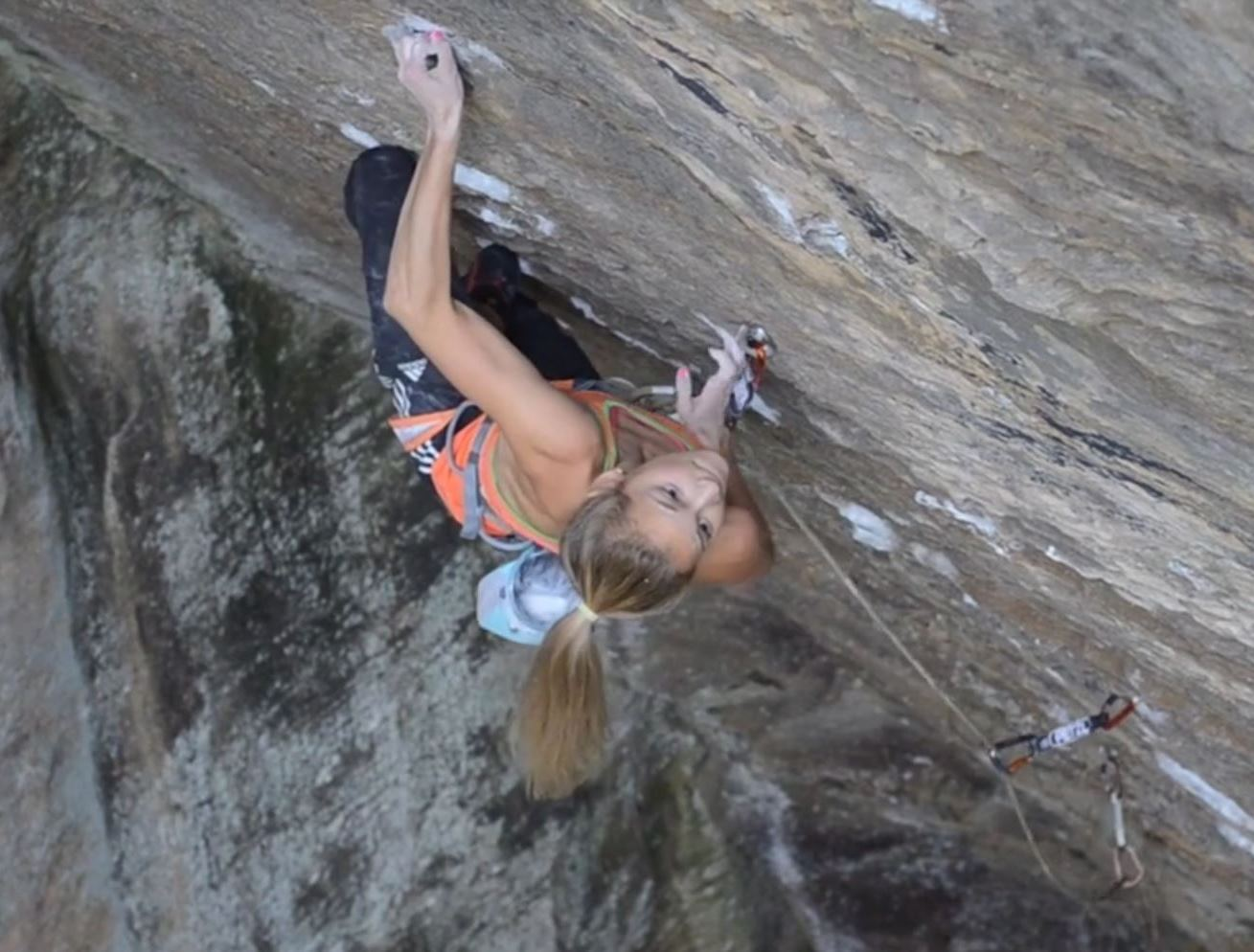
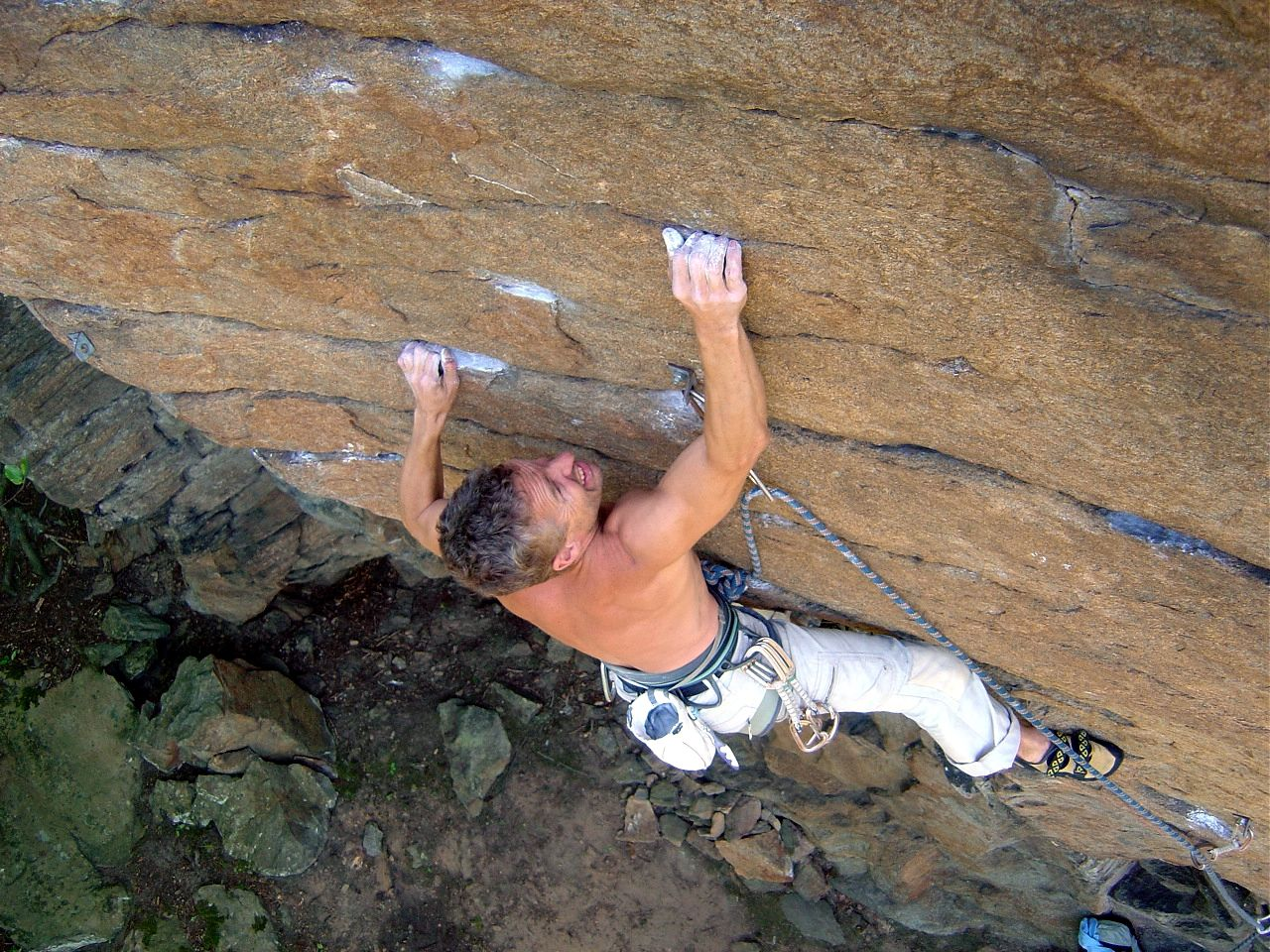

In rock climbing a face climb is a type of climbing route where the rock face is both fully vertical, unlike in slab climbing, and largely featureless, unlike in crack climbing. Face-climbing routes are typically sustained and exposed, and longer multi-pitch face-routes can become big wall climbing. Face-climbing became more common with the introduction of sport climbing in the 1980s, when French climbers began to fix permanent bolts into the rock for climbing protection — in contrast to traditional climbing — allowing them to ascend the blanker rock faces in places like the Verdon Gorge and Buoux in France.

Face climbs emphasize the rock-climbing techniques of 'crimping' and of 'edging' that use small features on the rock to help with upward mobility. Face-climbing on advanced limestone routes can also involve using one and two-finger pockets (also called Huecos) that require considerable strength in the finger tendons. Because face climbs are not always uniformly sheer from top to bottom, some off-angle slab climbing skills may also be required, and the terms are often used interchangeably — although incorrectly — to describe any form of non-overhanging, near-vertical, featureless climbing route.

The evolution of new technical grade milestones that came with face-climbing was helped by the simultaneous introduction of new climbing training techniques and tools, and in particular the hangboard, and by the campus board. Particularly notable face-climbing routes include Jerry Moffatt's The Face from 1983 in Germany, the world's first-ever 8a+ (5.13c) graded route, and Wolfgang Gullich's Kanal im Rücken (from 1984 in Germany), Punks in the Gym (from 1985 in Australia), and Wallstreet (from 1987 in Germany), which were the world's first-ever routes at the grade of 8b (5.13d), 8b+ (5.14a), and 8c (5.14b) respectively. The creation of single-pitch sport climbing routes such as Ben Moon's Hubble in 1990, and Gullich's Action Directe in 1991, moved the focus of the leading rock climbers to overhang climbing routes on which all future new milestones in climbing grades would be set. However, face-routes would continue to feature in new grade milestones in multi-pitch climbing, such as the Alpine Trilogy of 8b+ (5.14a) graded big-wall face-climbing routes freed in 1993 to 1994, by Stefan Glowacz (Des Kaisers neue Kleider), by Thomas Huber (The End of Silence), and by Beat Kammerlander (Silbergeier).

== See also ==
- Crack climbing
- Slab climbing
- Overhang (climbing)
- Rock-climbing technique
