= 2024 IFSC Climbing European Championships =

Climbing championships

- Venue: Place du Rendez-Vous
- Location: Villars-sur-Ollon, Switzerland
- Date: 27 August – 1 September
- Website: ifsc-climbing.org

The 2024 IFSC Climbing European Championships, the 15th edition, was held in Villars-sur-Ollon, Switzerland from 27 August to 1 September 2024. The competition climbing event consisted of lead, speed, bouldering, and combined events.

== Medal summary ==
Event	Gold	Silver	Bronze
Men's boulder	Sam Avezou; France	Maximillian Milne; Great Britain	Dayan Akhtar; Great Britain
Men's lead	Sascha Lehmann; Switzerland	Sam Avezou; France	Guillermo Peinado; Spain
Men's speed	Ludovico Fossali; Italy	Matteo Zurloni; Italy	Erik Noya Cardona; Spain
Men's combined (boulder & lead)	Sam Avezou; France	Sascha Lehmann; Switzerland	Jonas Utelli; Switzerland
Women's boulder	Naïlé Meignan; France	Ayala Kerem; Israel	Agathe Calliet; France
Women's lead	Laura Rogora; Italy	Jenya Kazbekova; Ukraine	Lynn van der Meer; Netherlands
Women's speed	Natalia Kałucka; Poland	Patrycja Chudziak; Poland	Giulia Randi; Italy
Women's combined (boulder & lead)	Laura Rogora; Italy	Jenya Kazbekova; Ukraine	Zélia Avezou; France

== Medal table ==
* Host nation (Switzerland)

Rank	Nation	Gold	Silver	Bronze	Total
1	France (FRA)	3	1	2	6
2	Italy (ITA)	3	1	1	5
3	Switzerland (SUI)*	1	1	1	3
4	Poland (POL)	1	1	0	2
5	Ukraine (UKR)	0	2	0	2
6	Great Britain (GBR)	0	1	1	2
7	Israel (ISR)	0	1	0	1
8	Spain (ESP)	0	0	2	2
9	Netherlands (NED)	0	0	1	1
Totals (9 entries)		8	8	8	24
