= Saint-Léger-du-Ventoux =

Saint-Léger-du-Ventoux Sant Laugier d'Aurenja (Occitan)
- Commune
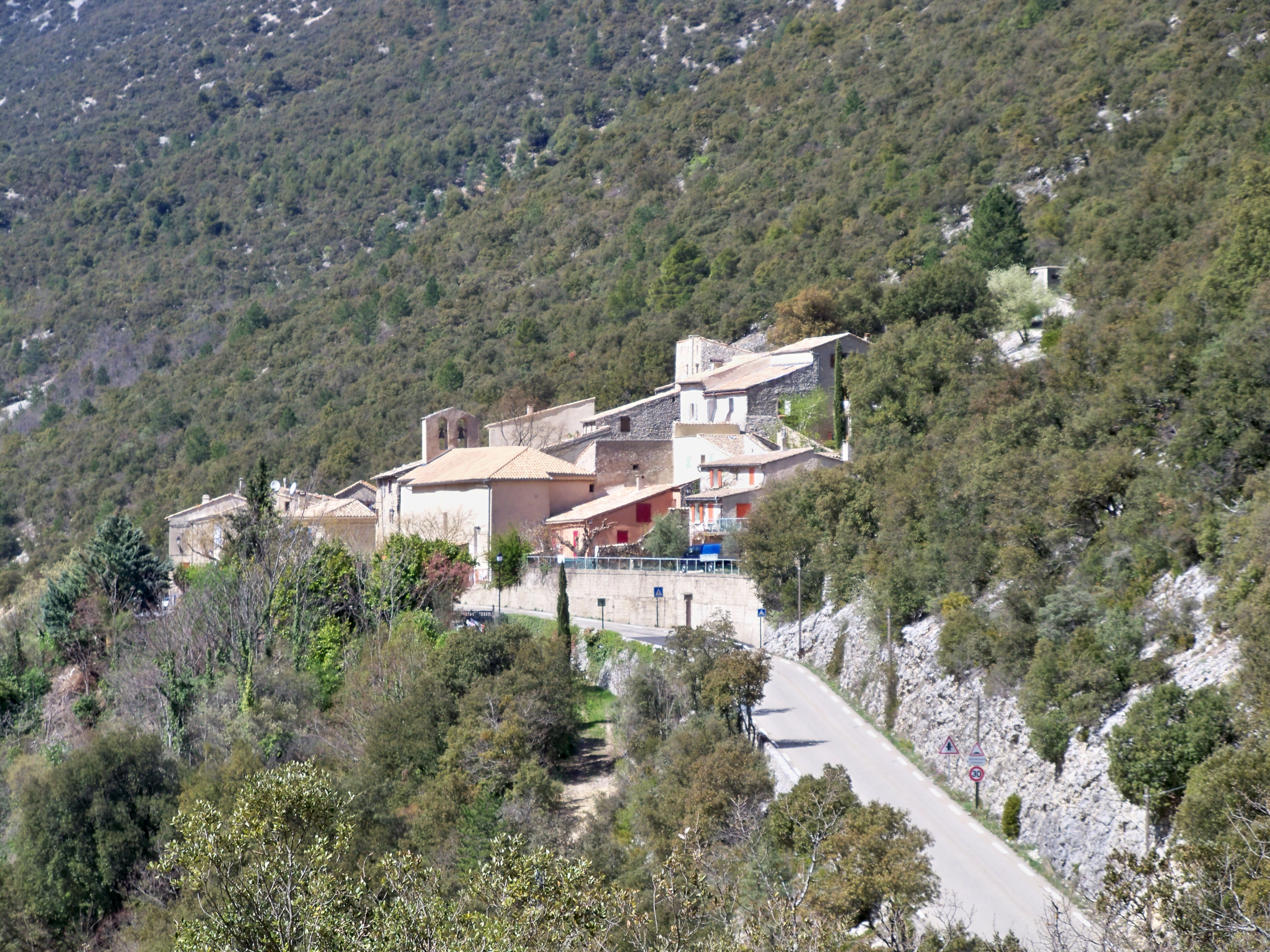
- A view of Saint-Léger-du-Ventoux

- Coat of arms
- Location of Saint-Léger-du-Ventoux
- Location within France Location within Provence-Alpes-Côte d'Azur
- Coordinates: 44°12′47″N 5°16′34″E
- Country: France
- Region: Provence-Alpes-Côte d'Azur
- Department: Vaucluse
- Arrondissement: Carpentras
- Canton: Vaison-la-Romaine
- Intercommunality: Vaison Ventoux

Government
  - Mayor (2020–2026): Éric Massot
- Area^{1}: 19.29 km^{2} (7.45 sq mi)
- Elevation: 386 m (1,266 ft)
- Highest elevation: 1,901 m (6,237 ft)
- Lowest elevation: 355 m (1,165 ft)
- Population (2023): 25
  - Density: 1.3/km^{2} (3.4/sq mi)
- Time zone: UTC+01:00 (CET)
  - Summer (DST): UTC+02:00 (CEST)
- INSEE/Postal code: 84110 /84390
- ^{1} French Land Register data, which excludes lakes, ponds, glaciers > 1 km^{2} (0.386 sq mi or 247 acres) and river estuaries.

Saint-Léger-du-Ventoux (French pronunciation: [sɛ̃ leʒe dy vɑ̃tu]; Occitan: Sant Laugier d'Aurenja; (Note: Aurenja is the Occitan name of the neighbouring city of Orange.) Provençal dialect: Sant Laugier dau Ventor, before 1953: Saint-Léger-d'Orange) is a rural commune in the Vaucluse department in the Provence-Alpes-Côte d'Azur region in Southeastern France. As of 2023, the population of the commune was 25. It is located on the departmental border with Drôme, which is also the regional border with Auvergne-Rhône-Alpes.

== See also ==
- Communes of the Vaucluse department
- Mont Ventoux
