= Route setter =

Designer of artificial rock climbing wall routes or problems

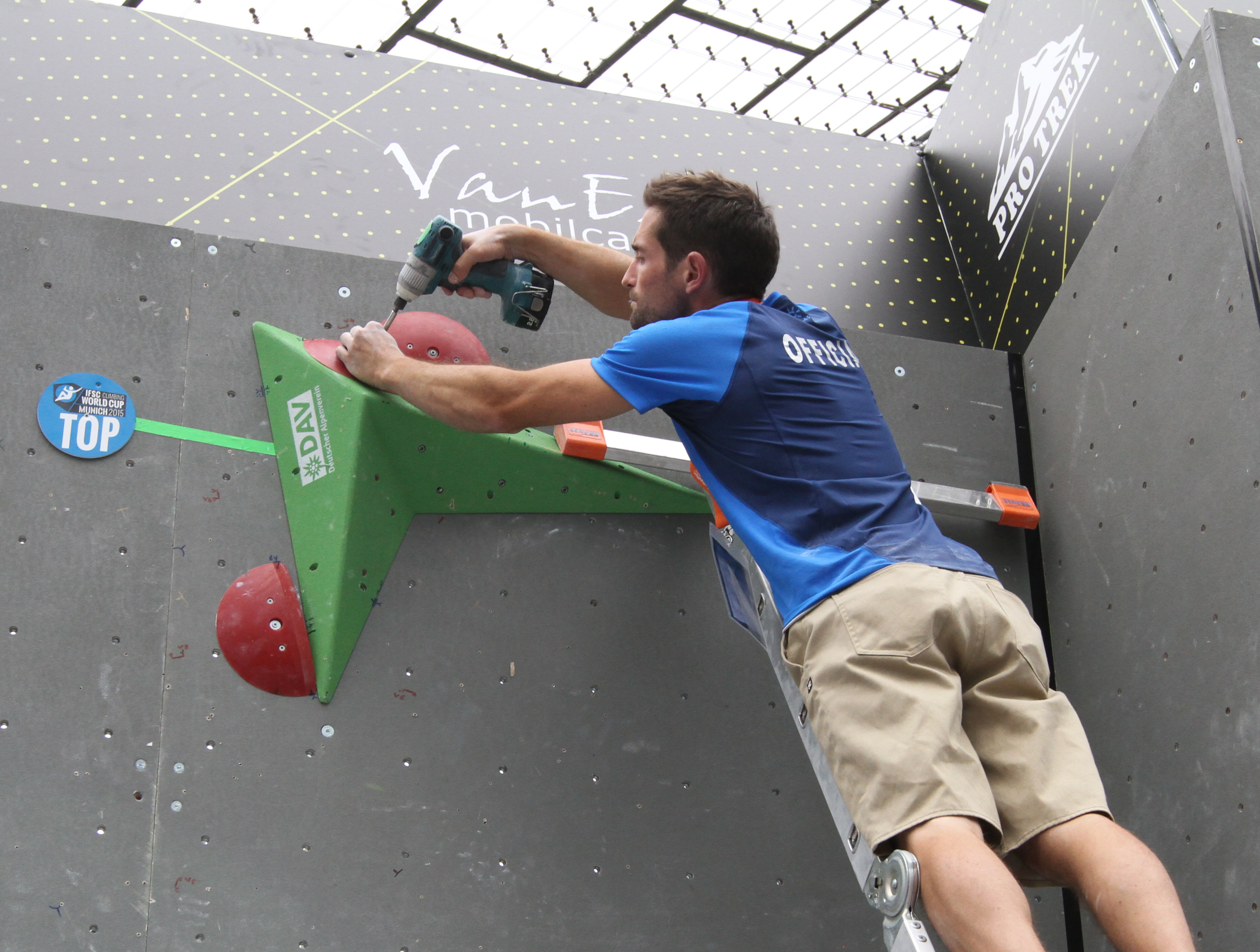
A route setter at the Bouldering World Cup 2015

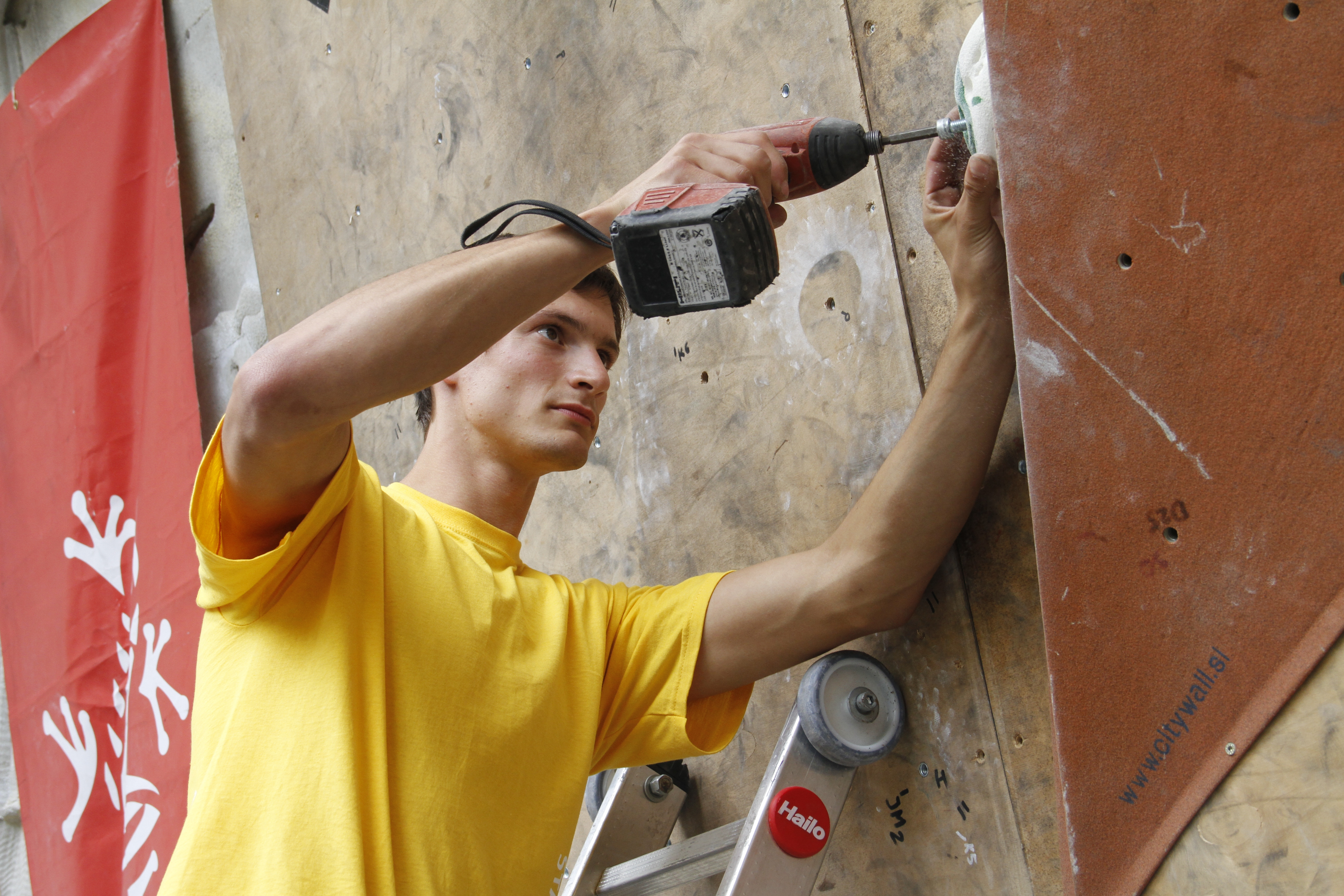
Former German boulderer Stefan Danker as a route setter

A route setter or routesetter (also known simply as a setter) is a person who designs artificial rock climbing wall routes or "problems". Route setters combine technical craft with an artistic representation of real rock climbing moves. They do this with modular climbing holds or "grips" that mimic real rock features, most often made out of resin, polyurethane, polyester, fiberglass, or wood. Route setters create new challenges for indoor climbing walls, and also for competition climbing routes.

== Description ==
The Climbing Wall Association has described route setters as "individuals that design and install materials onto a climbing surface for the purpose of human interaction. They are a mix of industrial athlete, craftsperson, artisan, choreographer, and product designer."

Route setters design routes for many different types of climbing, such as bouldering, top roping, and lead climbing.

Someone wishing to become a route setter at a specific climbing gym can take a short workshop at that gym to learn the basics; the limitation is that their skills will only be recognized by that climbing gym. If they want to route set elsewhere, however, the person may register for a route setter certification workshop where, depending on their ability, one of five grades of route setting can be attained. Usually, the more complex routes the route setter can make, the higher the level of certification.

== Process ==
=== Motivation ===
The simplest ways for a setter to set an indoor route are by focusing on either placement, holds, and/or theme. Setters tend to stay away from miscellaneous holds placed randomly on a wall that are not one of the previously mentioned categories. This is because they are difficult to climb, not very enjoyable and are aesthetically unpleasing.

==== Placement ====
Setting a route by placement involves choosing a specific part of the artificial wall to base the route around. A wall may have "natural" features or arêtes that a setter wants to be used when someone climbs the route.

==== Holds ====
Setting a route by holds involves a specific hold or holds that a setter wants to base the route on. Occasionally these specific holds comprise the crux of the route.

==== Theme ====
Setting a route by theme involves only using holds of one type, such as crimps, slopers, jugs, or pockets. The setter can also base the theme on one specific hold coloring, brand of holds, or anything else that is common among all holds the setter chooses.

Setters must plan routes to be within their climbing abilities; otherwise they cannot test their own route and may be unable to finish setting it. Route setters must make sure to communicate with gym managers while setting, because they will often need more routes of a specific difficulty or type.

Route setting can be done solo or in groups. The advantage of having more setters is that different setters have different strengths and weaknesses in climbing, and can each individually forerun the route. The problem about having more people is there can be a clash of ideas and efficiency can go down because of this.

=== Mounting holds ===
To mount a hold into an artificial wall, a setter can simply screw it in with a screwdriver. Mounting holds is made simpler by the fact that walls are built with existing holes for holds to be screwed into. Holds require different types of screws, depending on which companies the holds were made by. Setters must use the proper screws and screwdriver to mount holds to ensure that they are stable on the wall. Holds can occasionally be pulled off the wall over many uses, which can result in injury or death. Setters may use a ladder if they cannot reach a location they wish to screw in a hold. Setters must mark off the area around the route that they are setting, because there might be loose holds that can fall on people passing by, or so that a climber does not accidentally climb into or around the incomplete area and possibly get hurt.

When a setter sets a route, they may use holds that are pre-existing on the wall for their route and do not necessarily have to put new ones up. At the start of route setting, they can either set routes by selecting hold by hold or by taping up places where they want each hold to be placed. Hold by hold is typically easier to start setting routes with. After each hold placement, the setter will want to test the route. This will show if they will need to make any adjustments to any holds. Possible adjustments could be to rotate the hold(s) so they are easier/harder to climb and help the continuity of the route. Also, the hold(s) could be out of reach for climbers or too easy to reach in which the setter would add a smaller foothold for the shorter people or move the holds, so the route is not as easy respectively.

=== Marking ===
A route setter may need to mark the holds of a route so that climbers can follow it effectively. This can be done in several different ways.

==== Tape ====
Route setters can mark routes by placing tape which is colored, patterned, or marked with symbols under or next to the holds of a route. When the indoor climbing industry was emerging in the 1980s–1990s, taping was the dominant approach to route marking. By the 2020s, this approach had become less popular in the United States, but is still common in other countries.

==== Labels and tags ====
Route setters can also mark routes using labels (sometimes made out of laminated paper), which go next to or under each hold in a route, or metal tags, which can be drilled or screwed into the wall next to each hold in a route.

==== Hold color ====
Route setters can avoid having to mark each hold of a route by keeping the hold color the same along the route, distinguishing it from other routes set with differently colored holds. By the 2020s, this approach had become "potentially the most widely used system in the United States" for route marking.

Climbing gyms may extend this approach by adopting a "hyper-monochromatic" system of route marking, in which hold color also indicates the route's grade.

==== Start and end marking ====
Route setters often mark the start and end of a route with tape, labels, or tags. The information on the markings at the start of a route can include the route's grade, the specific starting holds of the route, circuits the route is on, route-specific rules, the route's name, or the setter's name/initials.

=== Forerunning ===
After everything is complete, setters often have other climbers to test their route. This is called forerunning. The goal of this is to see if the other climbers agree with the setter’s marked grade. The climber(s) should be able to climb the difficulty of the marked route before asking them to test it. There will always be climbers who climb the route differently from how the setter has planned to climb it when they set it. This is not wrong, and the setter should not be biased or judge the climber for it. After a few climbers test it, the setter may want to modify the route. Routes are never permanent and always receive changes. Exception is if the route is made for a competition, then it will not be altered until the competition is over. Routes will be removed whenever the climbing gym staff decides to change routes or add more routers or strip the wall and clean it for climbing competitions. At a climbing competition there will be designed route settings who will set from all grade levels and these new routes will typically stay up for a while.

When a setter is creating routes for top-roping or lead-climbing, it is very similar, except that they will have more vertical space to build on versus horizontal space unlike bouldering. They will need a ladder and/or self-belaying device. When the setter is self-belaying, they can attach a bucket or two onto their harness for stripping then wall of old holds and/or adding new holds onto the wall. Route setting for top-roping/lead-climbing can follow the similar techniques listed above, except it is more common to add tape before hold in this case.

== Grading ==
After a route is complete, a route setter often grades it according to its technical difficulty. Different grading systems are used for different types of climbing, and the systems used by route setters can vary between climbing gyms and geographic locations. Setters typically use the American V-scale (or "Hueco" scale) or the French Font scale for bouldering routes, and typically use the French numerical system or the Yosemite Decimal System (YDS) for top rope routes.
