= Slab climbing =

Type of rock climbing route

Examples of slab climbing

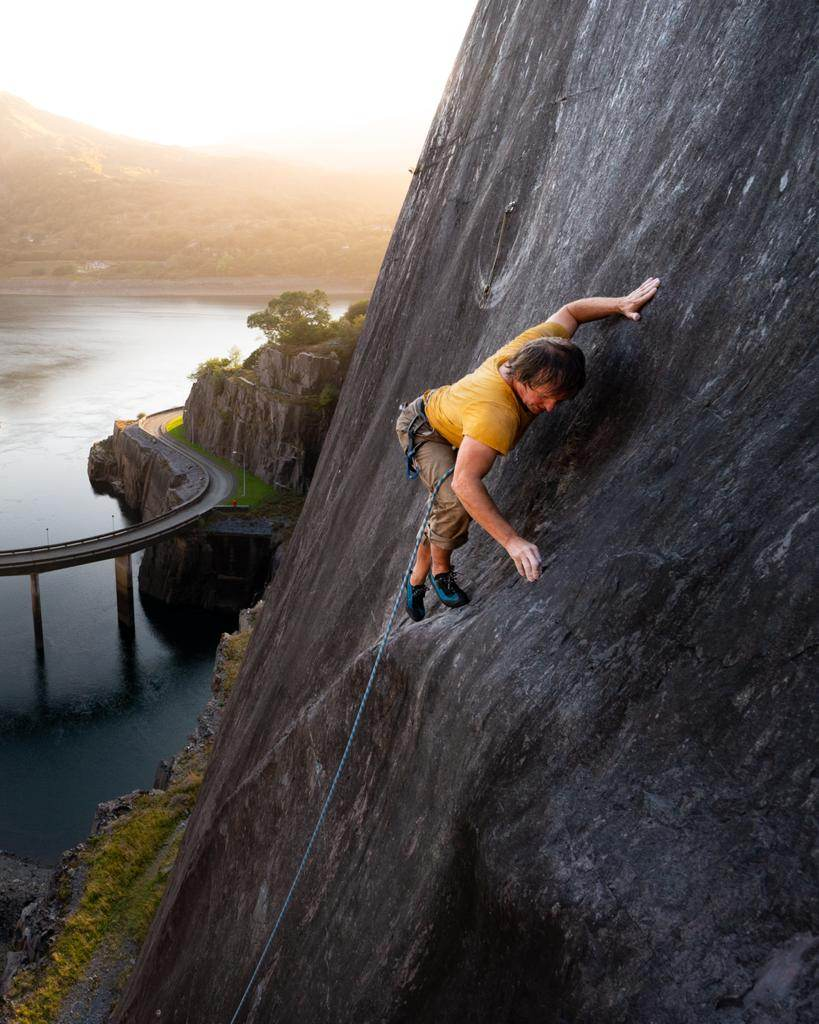
Johnny Dawes on Poetry Pink (E5 6b)

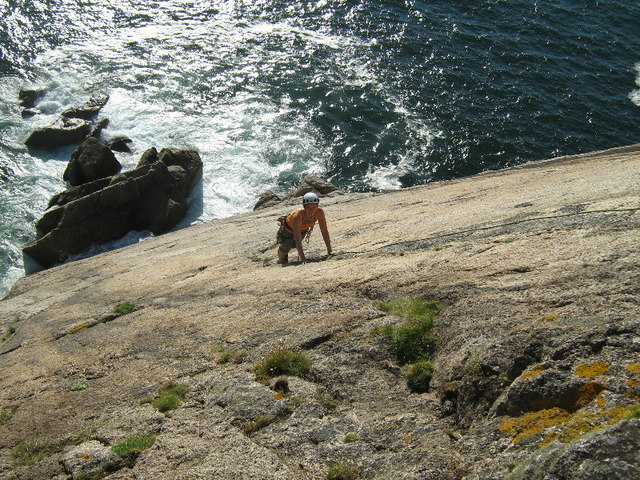
Looking down the classic slab-route, The Devil's Slide (HS 4a), Lundy

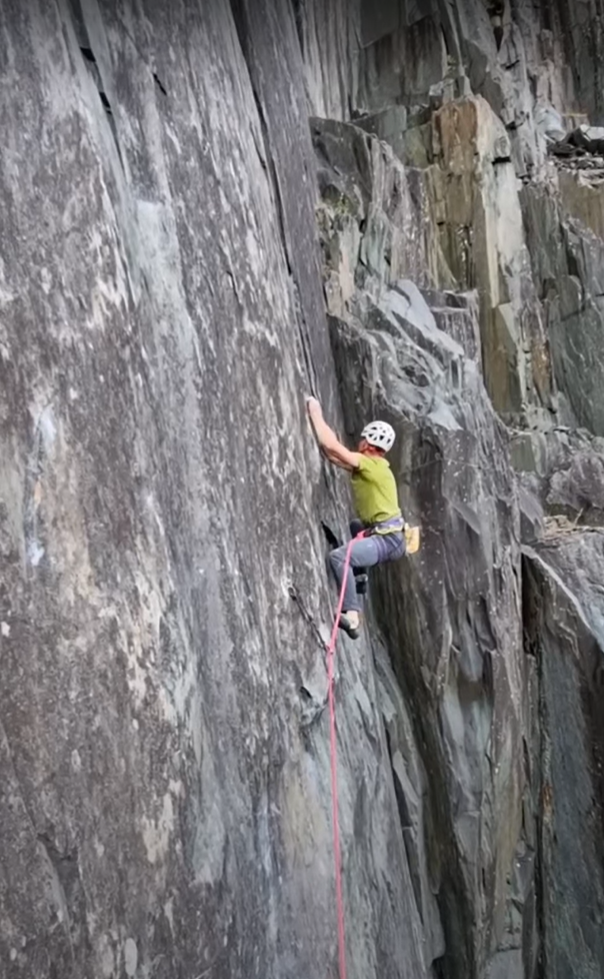
Angus Kille on The Meltdown (9a), Twll Mawr

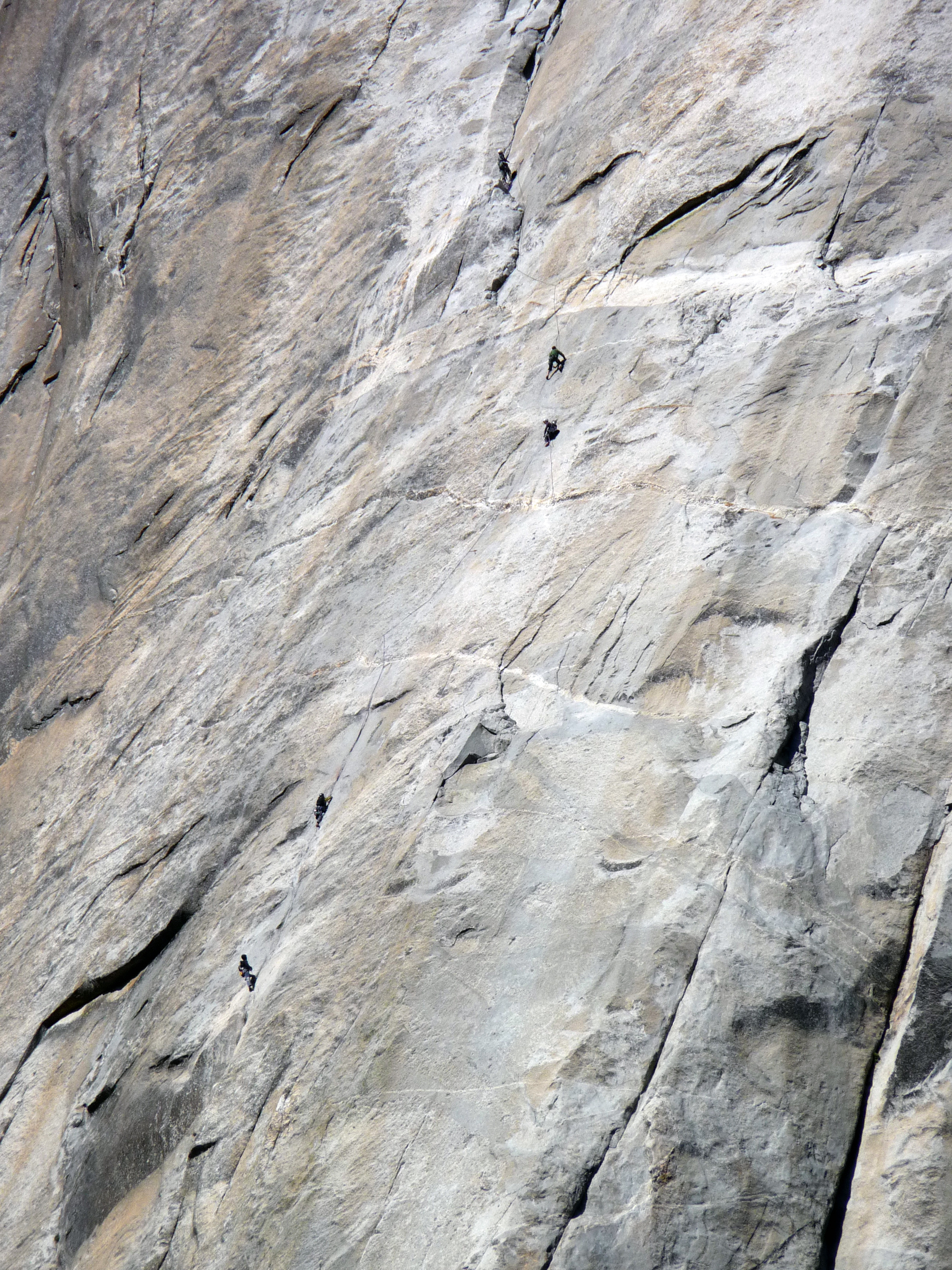
Multiple teams ascending the early slab pitches of El Capitan

In rock climbing a slab climb (or friction climb) is a type of climbing route where the rock face is 'off-angle' and not fully vertical. While the softer angle enables climbers to place more of their body weight on their feet, slab climbs maintain the challenge by having smaller holds. Some of the earliest forms of rock climbing were on large easy-angled slabs encountered by climbers while mountaineering (e.g. the Idwal slabs in Wales or the Flatirons in Colorado), however, the introduction of advanced rubber-soled shoes enabled climbers to use the technique of 'smearing' to ascend steeper and blanker slabs.

Slab climbs on rock surfaces with good friction, such as granite or sandstone, emphasize the foot technique of 'smearing', and thus can have almost no hand holds for very hard routes. In contrast, slab climbs on rock surfaces with poorer friction, such as quartzite or slate, emphasize the foot-and-hand techniques of 'crimping' and 'edging' on small edges in the rock. Regardless of the surface, slab climbing emphasizes balance and body positioning, and is often considered a 'pure form' of rock climbing, less reliant on physical strength and power — and it is thus considered a core skill for novice climbers.

The lack of holds and features gives a greater sense of exposure and falls are painful due to scraping against the face, making slabs feel intimidating. On advanced slab-routes, the lack of options for inserting protection makes traditional climbing challenging (e.g Prinzip Hoffnung) or dangerous (e.g. Indian Face). Slab climbing can be confused with face climbing which is on vertical rock, with Tommy Caldwell telling Climbing in 2023, "you have to be able to stand there and let go without tipping over backwards", and Paige Classen adding "I would define slab as an angle, not a style".

California is particularly notable for its abundance of high-quality granite slabs (e.g., Suicide Rock), with routes such as Tommy Caldwell and Beth Rodden's Lurking Fear on El Capitan, one of the world's hardest multi-pitch slab-routes. English climber Johnny Dawes was notable for his 'smearing' technique and his ability to climb extreme slab-routes without using his hands. Dawes made the first free ascent of Indian Face and pioneered slab climbing on bolted sport climbing slate routes. One of the world's hardest slab climbs was The Meltdown 9a (5.14d), a 1980s Dawes project in Twll Mawr, that was only climbed by James Mchaffie in 2012. By 2024, it was joined by the two 9b (5.15b) graded slab-routes of Cryptography (in Switzerland) and Disbelief (in Canada), as well as the neighboring line of The Dewin Stone at 9a+ (5.15a).

== See also ==
- Crack climbing
- Face climbing
- Overhang (climbing)
- Rock-climbing technique
