= Squamish =

Squamish may refer to:

== Places ==
- Squamish, British Columbia, a district municipality in British Columbia, Canada
- Squamish-Lillooet Regional District, British Columbia, Canada
- Squamish River, a river in British Columbia, Canada, named after the Squamish people

== People ==
- Squamish people, a Northwest Coast indigenous people, in their language "Sḵwx̱wú7mesh", after whom the river is named (the town of Squamish is named for the river)
- Squamish language, the language of the Squamish people
- Squamish Nation, the band government of the Squamish people

== Other ==
- 43-Man Squamish, a fictional sport featured in Mad Magazine
- Squamish Five, a militant activist group, named as such by the media because they were arrested near Squamish, British Columbia
- Squamish (wind), a type of wind in coastal British Columbia
