= Climbing hold =

Shaped grip attached to a climbing wall

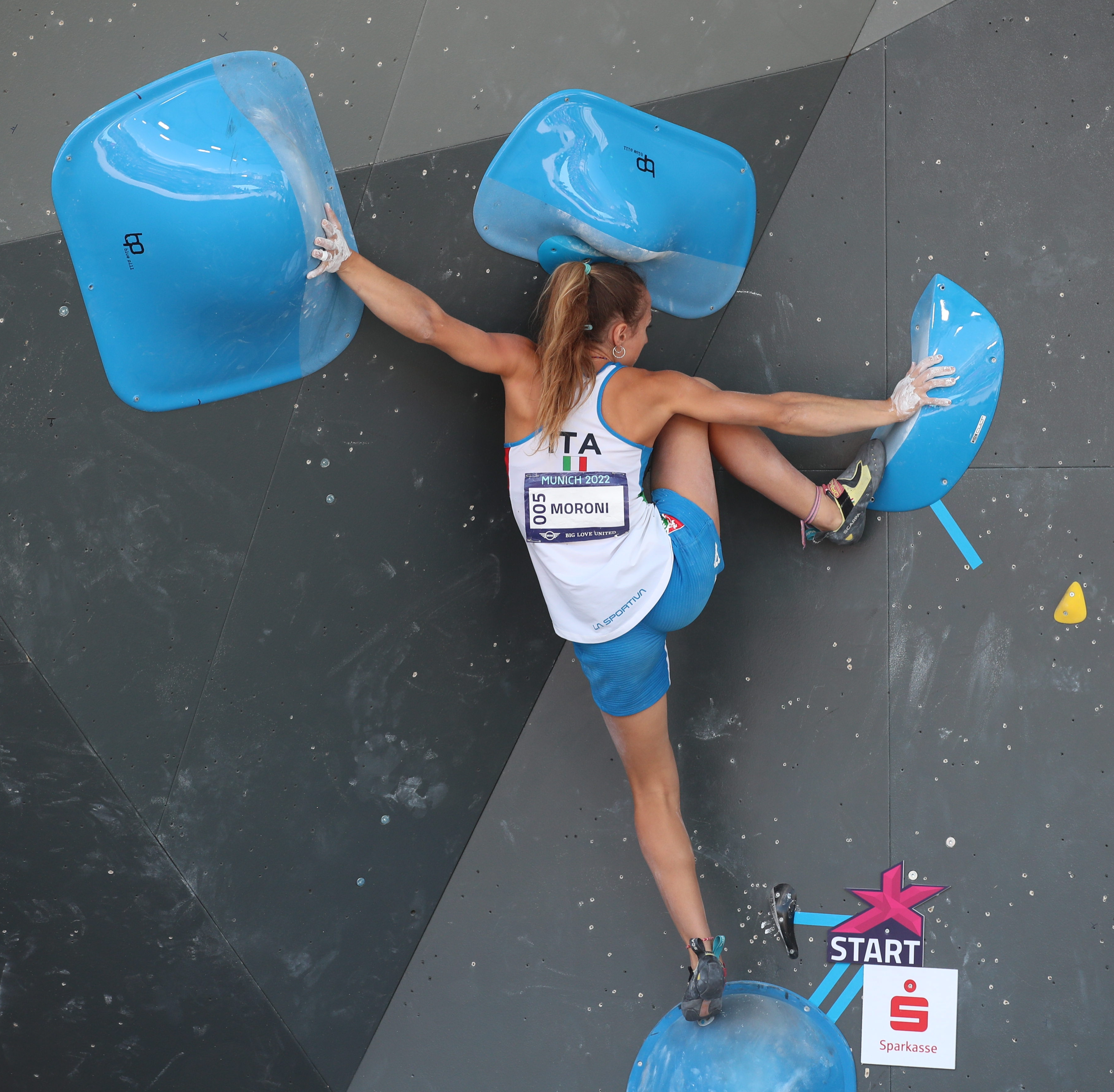
A competition climber using fiberglass macro climbing holds on an artificial wall during a bouldering event

A climbing hold is a shaped grip that is usually attached to a climbing wall so that climbers can grab or step on it. On most walls, climbing holds are arranged in paths called routes, by specially trained route setters. Climbing holds come in a large array of sizes and shapes to provide different levels of challenge to a climber. Holds are either bolted to a wall via hex-head bolts and existing T-nuts or they are screwed on with several small screws. In extreme cases, concrete anchors may be used (if putting holds on the underside of a bridge, for example).

== Early materials ==
=== Rock ===
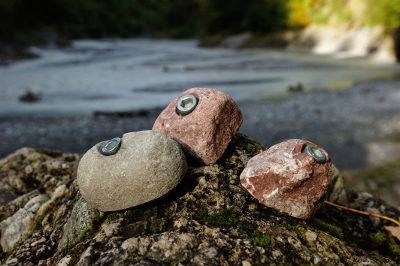
Natural stone climbing holds

In the early stages, climbing holds were crafted by casting real rocks into concrete blocks; later, they evolved into rocks with holes drilled into them, allowing attachment to a wall. While the feel of these holds is realistic, rock holds are heavy and can polish with heavy use.

Occasionally, modern holds are still produced from machined rocks such as granite; these are often produced as composite holds with a wooden base.

=== Wood ===
Wood was another early hold-making material, mainly because it was inexpensive and easy to carve into various shapes. It is still used today in various forms for homemade and commercially produced hand holds. Wood holds are usually smooth and pleasant to grab, though they are difficult to wash and splintering may become a problem with age. Wolfgang Güllich made the first campus board with wooden rungs. In recent years wooden holds have made a resurgence, especially for steep training boards, though some climbing walls do use wooden holds alongside their resin holds

=== Polyester resin ===
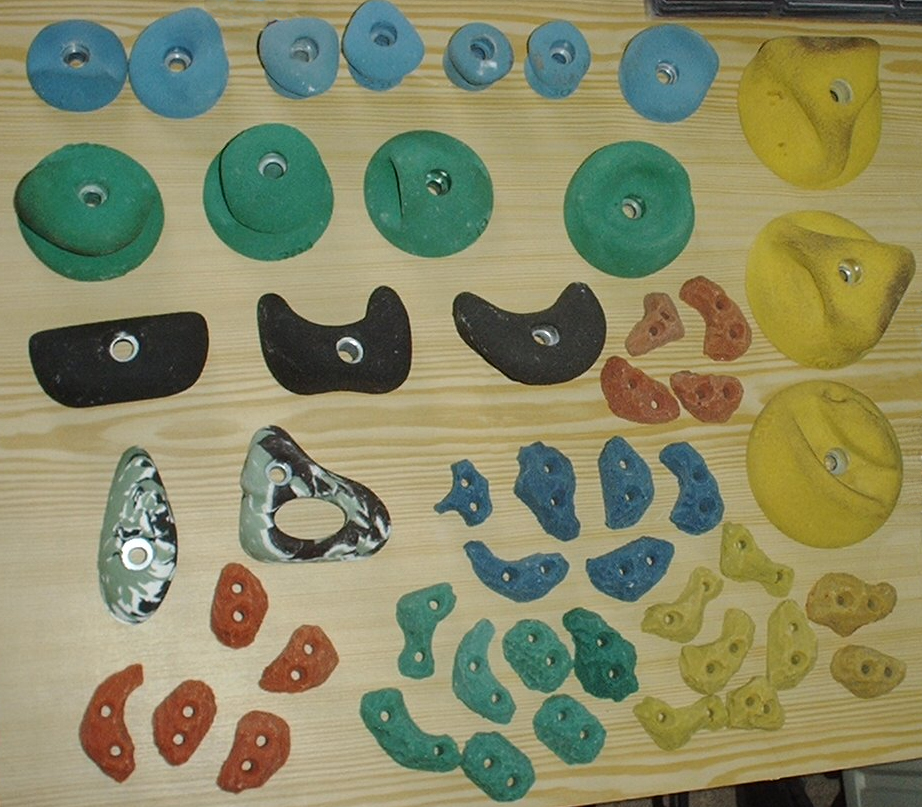
A variety of resin holds

In the early days, most companies that manufactured holds used a resin mixture. Early mixtures of polyester resin (PE) had issues with wear and tear, often becoming chipped and cracked. The chipped or broken edge of a resin hold can often provide an unintended place to grab that can be sharp or otherwise dangerous to the climber. Because resin holds are not flexible, they may crack if they are being tightened down on a wall that is not completely flat. Modern polyester mixes have largely overcome these problems. A final problem is the weight of resin holds. As hold sizes have grown and grown, in many cases resin has become an impractical material to use. However, using a process known as hollow-backing the weight of the hold can be dramatically reduced. Modern production methods such as hollow-backing are keeping polyester as the preferred choice for many climbing walls and hold production companies.

== Other materials ==
"Synthetic rock" (resin/rock powder mixture) combined with slippery hard plastic is another innovation. The texture of these holds is quite like outdoor rock, allowing hold shapes that would be dangerous with a more slippery material.

Corn and soy based resins are being developed for use in climbing holds. The goal is an "environmentally friendly" hold material that is also light and durable.

== Modern materials ==
=== Polyurethane resin ===
Currently, a large quantity of commercial holds are made of polyurethane (often called PU or urethane in the USA) or a polyurethane mixture. PU is lighter, more flexible, and less prone to chipping and breakage than polyester or natural materials. Like polyester (PE), PU mixtures can vary, and different mixtures have different textures and strengths. It's very simple to make a quality polyester recipe, but much harder to make a top quality polyurethane. If the polyurethane is too soft it will split apart when the hold is tightened, or the bolt might get pulled through the hold, or the hold will flex on the wall or could polish (become slick) quickly. If the polyurethane is too hard it will be brittle (like polyester) and the edges could chip or it could crack when tightened (also like polyester). Some climbers believe polyurethane can become warm with intensive use, though a few moments of not being held and some brushing usually solves the problem. PU holds are generally a lot lighter than Polyester holds as PU tolerates a much thinner wall so it can be hollowed out and maintain strength whereas PE holds need to be solid or have very thick walls or they are much more prone to breaking. Polyurethane is the leading hold material in the USA. However, there is an Atlantic split with most of Europe preferring Polyester mixes. There are many reasons for this, mostly that PU is generally a newer material and Europe only recently has been exposed to quality PU mixes. Additionally, PU is generally more expensive than PE.

=== Fiberglass ===
In an effort to improve the durability of climbing holds, many materials have been experimented with. Thin, hollow fiberglass holds are extremely light and strong. A desirable texture is overlaid onto the fiberglass using various methods. Early fiberglass holds had a texture made from sand mixed into paint, progressing to sand embedded into various types of resin. Modern companies have developed techniques to place polyester resin over the fiberglass, giving a hold which has all the benefits of both resin types without the downsides. The main issue with this texture is the complexity in manufacture means few companies have the ability to produce them and also the cost of these holds is relatively high. Texture longevity is also an issue.

T-nuts may be embedded in the fiberglass so additional holds can be bolted to the main hold.

== Hold types ==
=== Jugs ===
The term "jugs", derived from the expression "jug-handle", has dual meanings in the climbing world. One meaning is size based—jugs are traditionally large holds. Most jugs should have space for both hands to fit on the hold. The other meaning of jug refers to a hold's positivity or degree of concavity. A hold that is called a jug should be fairly easy to use, meaning it is either a very positive hold or it is a flat hold on a less than vertical wall (slab). Because they are easy to use, jugs are often found on beginner routes, warm-up problems, and steep walls. Jugs are also commonly used as resting or clipping holds on routes.

=== Mini-jugs ===
Mini-jugs are holds that are positive but much smaller than traditional jugs. They are usually intended to be held with one hand only. They are useful because they are easier to carry in a bucket than big jugs and they use less material to manufacture than larger holds do (so they are more cost effective).

=== Slopers ===
"Slopers" are the least positive of the handholds. They slope down away from the wall with generally a smooth surface, therefore requiring the climber, for maximum friction and in order to gain maximum effectiveness of the hold, to use an open handed grip to pull against the hold and push inwards. These holds are usually considered more difficult and are typically reserved for advanced routes.

=== Pockets ===
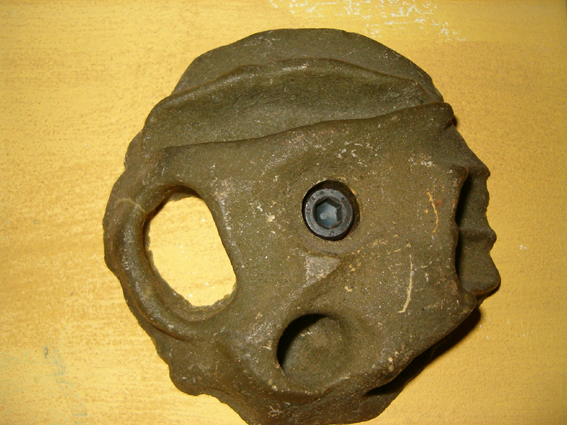
A hold with several pockets

Pockets are holds that have a small opening, only allowing the climber to hold them with one to three fingers. Pockets can be shallow or deep. One fingered pockets are called monos, and are considered extremely stressful on the tendons. Finger strength must be trained in order to use pockets effectively. Though monos are the most dangerous, all pockets load only a couple of fingers, so climbers must be careful to avoid injuring their tendons. If the edge of the pocket has a sharp radius it will feel more positive but also more uncomfortable. A smooth radius on a pocket is generally the most comfortable to climb on.

=== Pinches ===
Pinches are holds that have two opposing faces which must be pinched (usually by the entire hand, with fingers on one side and the thumb on the other) to grip. Technically, any hold in which the use of the thumb in opposition improves the hold's positivity is a pinch. Pinches require significant hand strength to use, and are usually used on more challenging routes and boulder problems.

=== Edges ===
Edges vary in size and angle. The best way to grip an edge varies in all ways to grip a hold, from open hand grip, to flex grip, and closed hand grip (which is more commonly referred to as crimping). Crimping is when an individual places their thumb over their pointer finger. It is often used as the way to refer to an edge as a "crimp", and there are many ways to better describe an edge- microcrimper (smallest), slopy crimper, big crimper, bad crimper, good crimper, Fred Nicole crimper (microcrimper), juggy crimper.

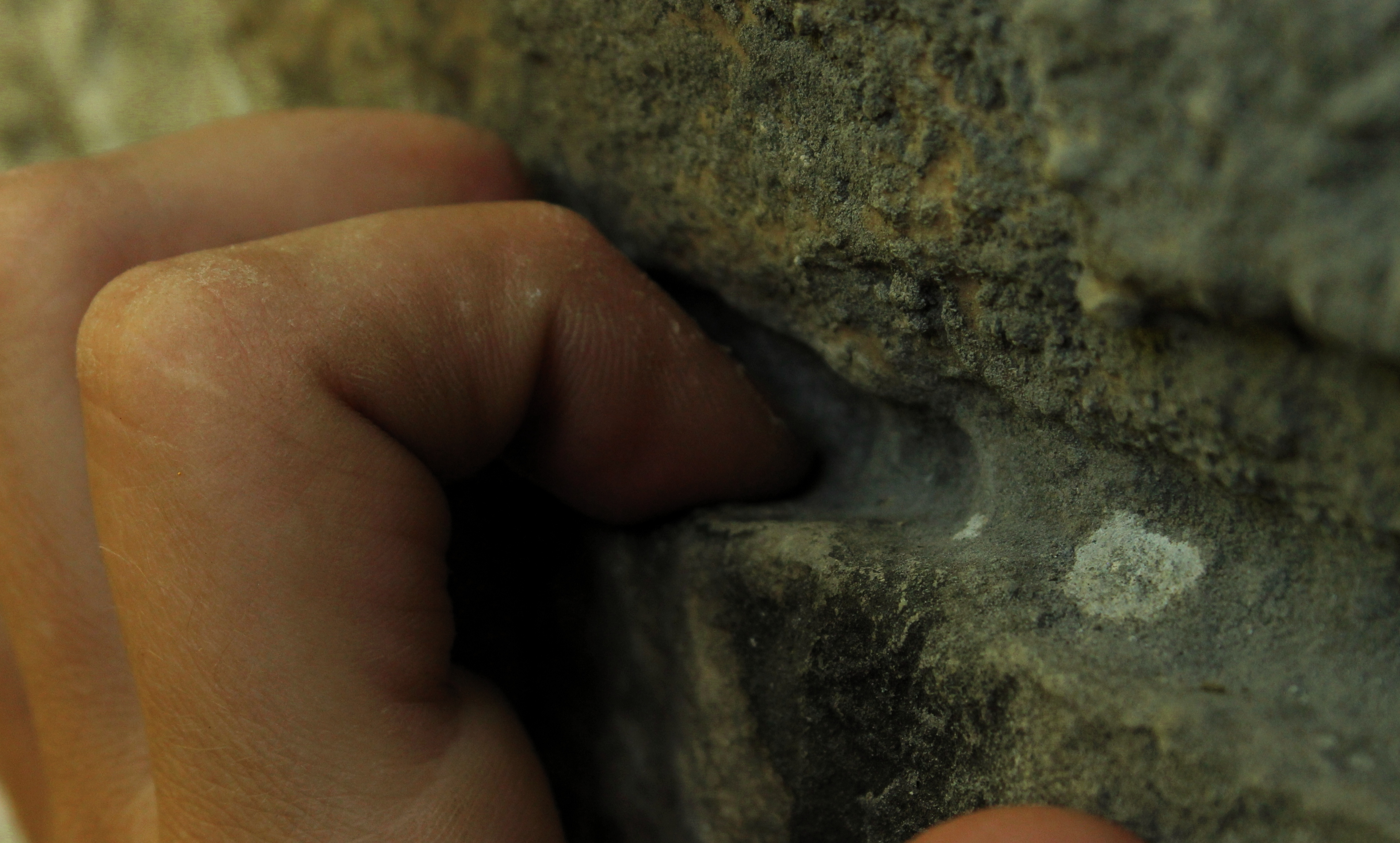
Holding a crimp

The picture to the right shows a person using a flex grip on an edge. Though the edge is being referred to as a "crimp" in this case, the climber is not actually crimping on the hold.

=== Volumes ===
Volumes are an extremely large type of hold that any variety of holds can be attached to. The volume is attached to the wall, and it has pre-placed t-nuts in it to which other holds can be attached. Volumes were at one time made from wood, but now they are also made in a variety of materials (including fiberglass, coated wood, resin, urethane, and moulded plastic) by several climbing companies. Volumes are especially prevalent in Europe and on the World Cup circuit, where sometimes entire routes will be constructed from gigantic volumes. To imitate these textured World Cup volumes, sandpaper can be placed on homemade wooden volumes to create texture and allow climbers to make use of the volume's features.

=== No-tex ===
No-tex holds are holds with completely smooth surfaces making them hard to grip in a conventional manner.

== See also ==
- Competition climbing
- Indoor climbing
