= Simon Lorenzi =

Belgian rock climber (born 1997)

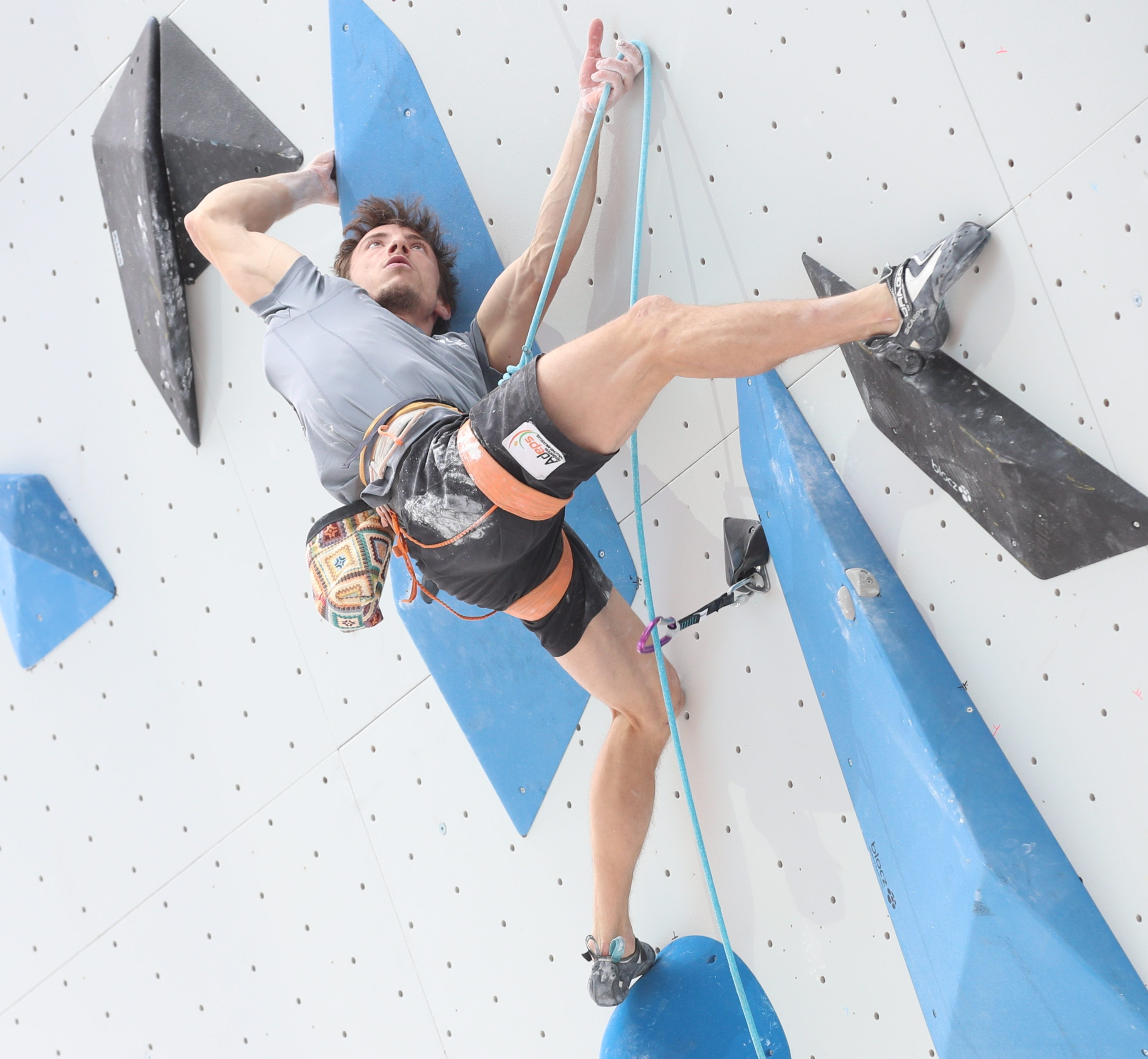
- Lorenzi in the competition lead climbing event at the 2022 IFSC Climbing European Championships

Personal information
- Nationality: Belgian
- Born: 9 February 1997 (age 29) Barchon, Blegny, Belgium
- Occupation: Professional climber
- Height: 168 cm (5 ft 6 in)

Climbing career
- Type of climber: Bouldering; Sport climbing; Competition climbing
- Ape index: +12 cm (5 in)
- Highest grade: Bouldering: V17 (9A)
- First ascents: Soudain Seul (Suddenly Alone) (V16/V17, 2023); Big Conviction (V16, 2022); Coup d'État (9a (5.14d), 2020)

Simon Lorenzi (born 9 February 1997) is a Belgian professional rock climber specializing in sport climbing, bouldering and competition climbing. Lorenzi is one of the very few climbers to have repeated a V17 (9A) bouldering route, and the third climber to solve Burden of Dreams, the first-ever V17 (9A) graded boulder route. Lorenzi also made the first ascent of Soudain Seul, a V16/V17 boulder.

== Early life ==
Lorenzi was born in Belgium and started climbing at age 2 with his father Claude Lorenzi, who was one of Belgium's leading rock climbers of the 1990s, and who created Belgium's first 8c (5.14b) graded sport climbing route, La traction universelle, in 1994.

== Climbing career ==
=== Competition climbing ===
Lorenzi began his competition climbing career in 2010 when he "unexpectedly" won a Belgium Youth Cup competition. By 2016, he had won the gold medal in the Junior category at the IFSC Climbing World Youth Championships for competition lead climbing.

=== Bouldering ===
In February 2021, Lorenzi made the first ascent of Soudain Seul, a sit-start to Dave Graham's 2008 8C (V15) graded bouldering route in Fontainebleau called The Island, which was later extended by two small moves by Vincent Pochon in 2010 to become The Big Island, also at the 8C (V15) grade. Soudain Seul (Suddenly Alone) was considered one of the "last great problems" in Fontainebleau. Lorenzi proposed a grade of V17 (9A), and at the time, the only other boulder in the world with such a grade was Nalle Hukkataival's 2016 problem, Burden of Dreams. Subsequent repeats by Nico Pelorson in 2021 and Camille Coudert in 2022 softened the likely grade to V16/V17.

In December 2022, he became the fourth climber to repeat Shawn Raboutou's 2022 problem Alphane, which has since become accepted as having a grade of V17 (9A). After completing Alphane, Lorenzi said that he felt Soudain Seul was at least as hard as Alphane. In December 2023, he became only the third climber to repeat Burden of Dreams, the world's first-ever V17 (9A) graded bouldering route.

== Notable ascents ==
=== Bouldering ===
V17 (9A):

- Return of the Sleepwalker – Red Rocks, Nevada – March 2025. Fourth ascent.
- Burden of Dreams – Lappnor, Finland – 27 December 2023. Third ascent.
- Alphane – Chironico, Switzerland – 15 December 2022. Fourth ascent.
- Shaolin - Red Rocks, Nevada - December 2025. Fourth Ascent.

V16/V17 :

- Soudain Seul – Fontainebleau, France – February 2021. First ascent.

V16 (8C+):

- Big Conviction – Fontainebleau, France – February 2022. First ascent.
- Off the Wagon Low – Val Bavona, Switzerland – February 2022.
- La Révolutionnaire – Fontainebleau, France – February 2022.

V15 (8C):

- Foundation's Edge – Fionnay, Switzerland – September 2022.
- Satan I Helvete Low – Fontainebleau, France – 2022.
- Power of Now direct – Magic Wood, Switzerland – 2021. First ascent.
- The Big Island – Fontainebleau, France – 2020.
- Dreamtime – Cresciano, Switzerland – January 2019. Lorenzi's first V15 boulder.

=== Sport climbing ===
9a (5.14d):

- Coup d'État – La Tranchée, Belgium – 28 June 2020. First ascent.
- Action Directe – Waldkopf, Frankenjura (GER) – 2017.

== Rankings ==
=== IFSC Climbing World Cup ===
Discipline	2015	2016	2017	2018	2019	2021	2022	2023	2024
Lead	75	69	38	72	41		93	35	
Bouldering			66		53	10	39	16	

=== Climbing World Championships ===
Youth

Discipline	2016 Junior
Lead	1

== See also ==
- Will Bosi
