= Spots of Time =

Bouldering route in the Lake District, England

- Location within England
- Location: Lake District National Park, Cumbria, England
- Coordinates: 54°32′25″N 3°02′50″W
- Climbing area: Swirl Crags, slopes of Helvellyn
- Route type: Bouldering
- Technical grade: 9A (V17)
- First ascent: Aidan Roberts, February 2024

Spots of Time is a grade 9A (V17) bouldering problem on the Swirl Crags buttresses on the flanks of Helvellyn in England’s Lake District. It was first climbed by British climber Aidan Roberts in February 2024 after a lengthy campaign; Roberts later proposed a grade of 9A (V17), which would make it the first established boulder of that grade in the United Kingdom. The problem received its first repeat by William Bosi in October 2024, who confirmed the 9A grade.

== Description ==
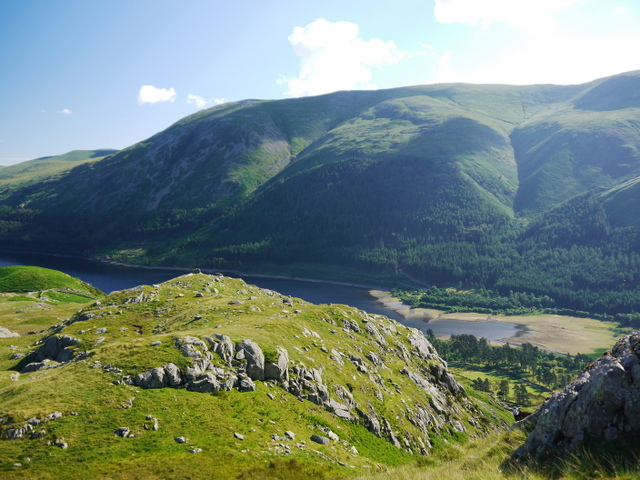
View of the west side of Helvellyn, where Spots of Time is located

The line climbs a short section of overhanging rock on the rhyolite buttresses of Swirl Crags. It involves a sequence of small flat handholds and precise body positioning, with climbers relying on a hard heel hook and subtle shifts of weight to maintain balance. Roberts described the boulder as "very fingers intensive," using a sequence of eighteen moves (eight hand moves, ten foot moves) in his first ascent. The climb's name is a reference to a William Wordsworth poem.

== History ==
Roberts worked the climb, which he referred to as the "Helvellyn Project," over several years and over 30 sessions. He reported that it took around 10 sessions before he was able to link the individual moves together in sequence. He completed the first ascent in February 2024, initially withholding a grade proposal before later suggesting 9A. A short film by Wedge Climbing that documents Roberts’ process and ascent was released in October 2024.

In October 2024, fellow British climber William Bosi made the first repeat after approximately eight sessions. Bosi confirmed the 9A grade, making Spots of Time the first 9A boulder in the United Kingdom. This made Bosi the first to climb four confirmed 9A boulders (following previous ascents of Alphane, Burden of Dreams, and Return of the Sleepwalker). Bosi reported Spots of Time was similar to Burden of Dreams and called it "one of the best hard lines in the world."

== Ascents ==
Spots of Time has been ascended by:

- 1st. Aidan Roberts in February 2024
- 2nd. William Bosi on 19 October 2024

== See also ==
- History of rock climbing
- List of grade milestones in rock climbing
- Helvellyn
