= William Bosi =

Scottish rock climber (born 1998)

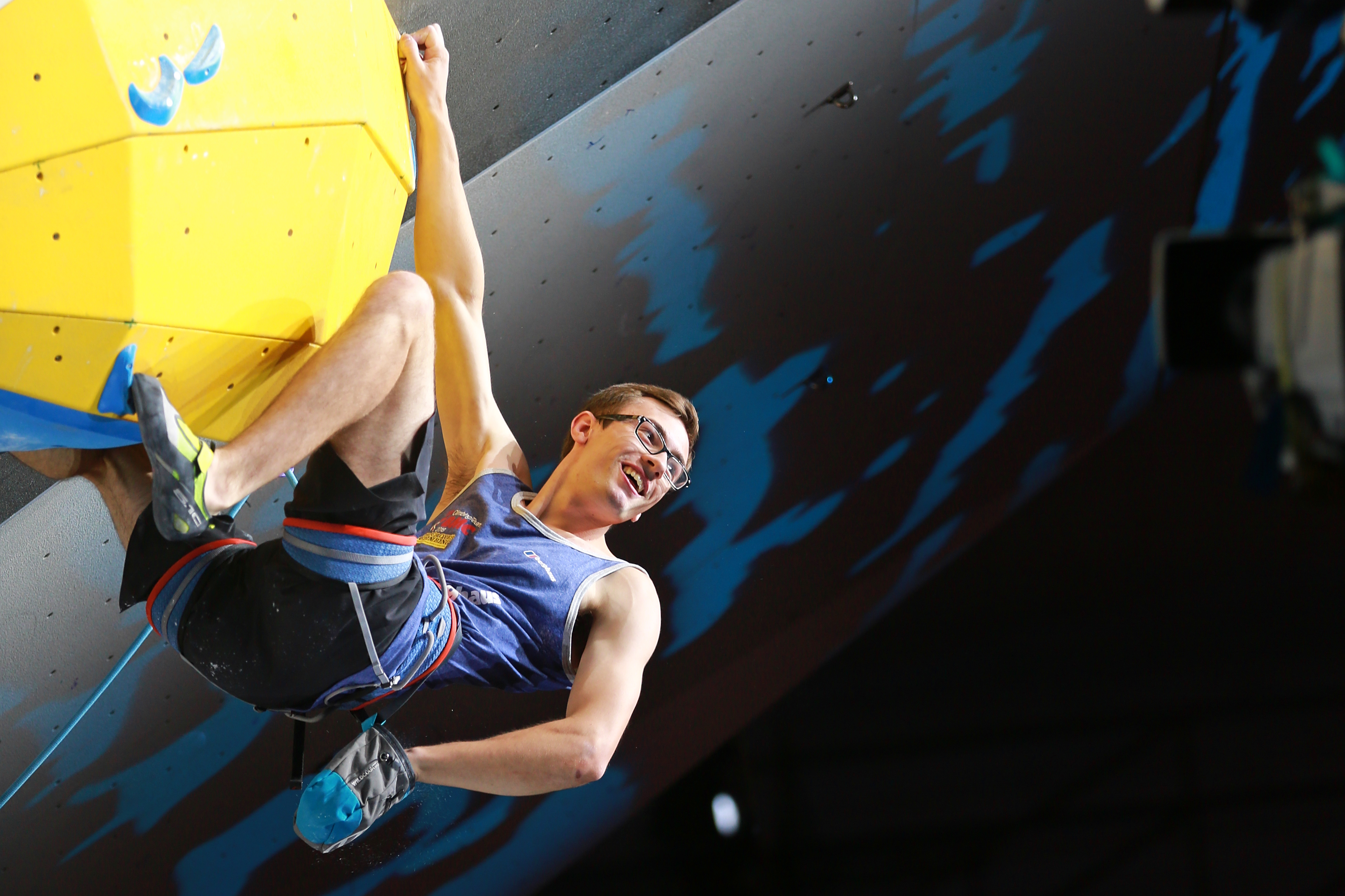
- Bosi in the semi-final of the 2018 IFSC Climbing World Championships

Personal information
- Born: 27 December 1998 (age 27) Edinburgh, Scotland, United Kingdom
- Education: Broughton High School, Edinburgh
- Occupation: Professional rock climber
- Height: 176 cm (5 ft 9 in)
- Weight: 65.7 kg (145 lb)
- Website: www.bandofbirds.co.uk/willbosi-athlete-page

Climbing career
- Type of climber: Bouldering; Sport climbing; Competition lead climbing
- Ape index: +5cm (1.8 in)
- Highest grade: Redpoint: 9b+ (5.15c); Onsight/Flash: 8b+ (5.14a); Bouldering: V17 (9A)
- First ascents: Honey Badger (V16, 2022); "Realm of Tor’ment" (V17, 2025); Free at Last (9a+, 2022); King Capella (9b, 2021); Brandenburg (9a+, 2021); La Furia de Jabalí (9a+, 2021)
- Known for: First Briton to climb 9b+ (5.15c); Second Briton to climb V17 (9A)
- Updated on 28 June 2023

William Bosi (born 27 December 1998) is a Scottish professional rock climber specializing in sport climbing, bouldering and competition climbing. Bosi was the first climber to have completed five V17 (9A) boulder problems including Alphane in 2022, Burden of Dreams in 2023, Return of the Sleepwalker and Spots of Time in 2024 and Realm of Tor'ment in 2025. Bosi is the first British climber to climb a 9b+ sport climb (Excalibur).

== Early life and education ==
Bosi was born in Edinburgh to Alison and Martin Bosi. His mother is a nursery nurse from Inverleith, Scotland. Both parents took him and his 3-year-old brother Alexander to an indoor climbing centre in Newhaven, Edinburgh when he was 6 years old. He attended Broughton High School, Edinburgh. By 2011, Bosi was the British Champion in the Youth Climbing Series (a competition climbing event for boys aged 11 to 13) and also the Scottish Youth Climbing Champion.

== Climbing career ==
=== Sport climbing ===
In 2016, Bosi came to attention when aged 17 he redpointed Steve McClure's famous British sport climbing route Rainshadow, becoming the youngest Briton to climb a 9a (5.14d) graded sport route.

In 2020–2021, Bosi became only the second British climber in history, after Steve McClure, to climb a 9b (5.15b) grade sport route with his repeat of Adam Ondra's La Capella, and followed up by his first free ascent of King Capella (a route initially considered a possible 9b+), both of which are in Siurana in Spain.

=== Bouldering ===
In 2022, on a trip with Adam Ondra to his home crag of Moravský Kras in the Czech Republic, Bosi flashed the 8B+ (V14) boulder, Charizard (he failed on Ondra's as yet unrepeated 8C+ boulder, Terranova). That year, he also created Honey Badger in the English Peak District, which he graded at 8C+ (V16).

In November 2022, Bosi became one of only a handful of boulderers in the world to have climbed a grade V17 (9A) boulder when he repeated Shawn Raboutou's Alphane, which he felt was easier than his own 8C+ graded route, Honey Badger. In April 2023, he made the first repeat of Nalle Hukkataival's Burden of Dreams, considered the world's first-ever V17 (9A) boulder, and which at the time of Bosi's repeat was still considered the world's hardest boulder. In February 2024, Bosi made the first repeat of Daniel Woods' Return of the Sleepwalker, which he felt was easier than Burden of Dreams, but harder than Alphane, with Bosi stating that Woods' route was definitely at a V17 grade. In October, Bosi repeated Aidan Roberts' Spots of Time 9A, confirming the grade and making it the first 9A boulder in the United Kingdom. This made Bosi the first to climb four confirmed 9A boulders.

=== Competition climbing ===
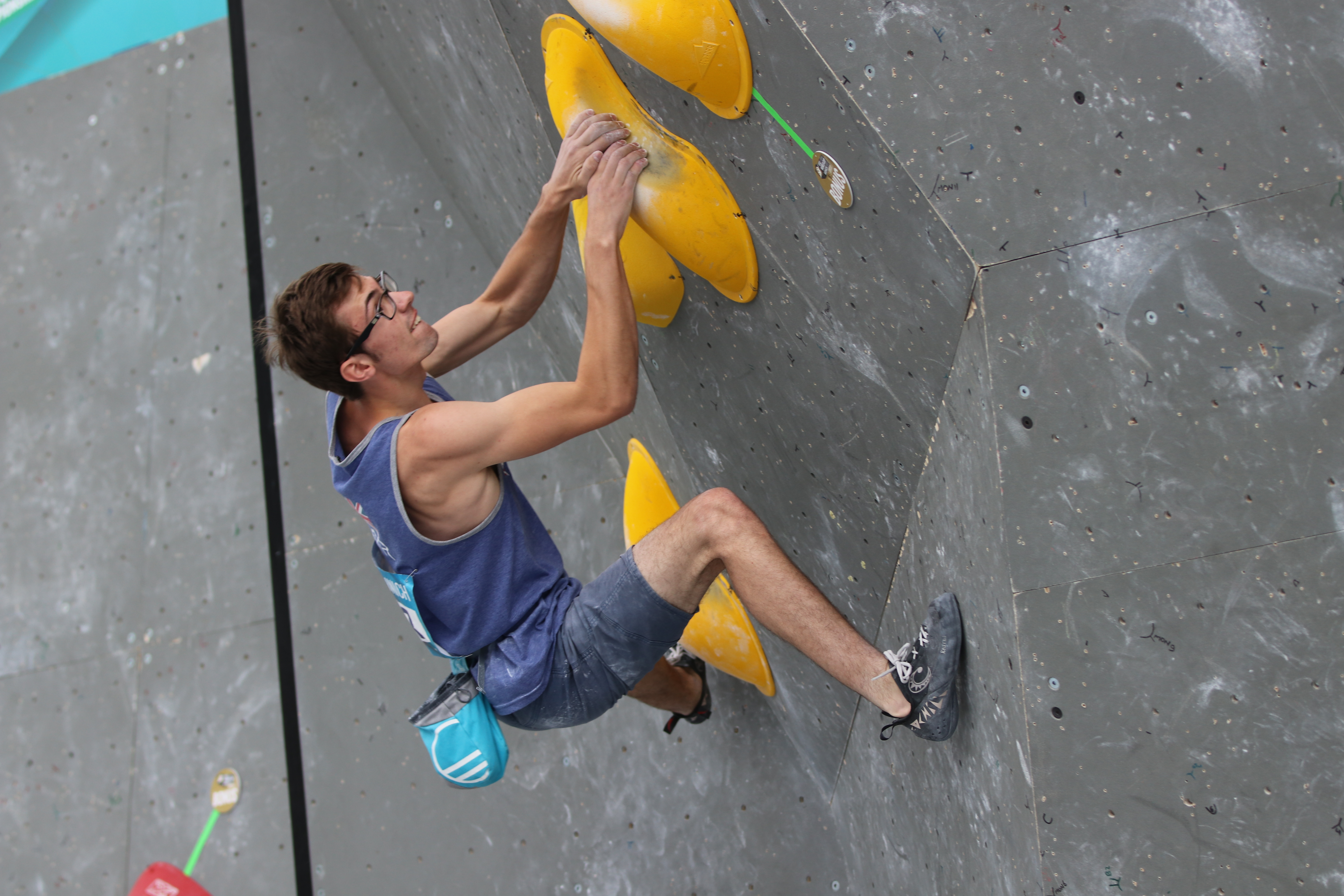
Bosi at the Munich leg of the 2017 Bouldering World Cup

Bosi has represented Britain in competition lead climbing, in both youth and adult formats, and in 2018 became the first Briton to reach an International Federation of Sport Climbing (IFSC) final in 30 years, where he finished fifth at the IFSC World Cup in Chamonix; he finished fourth twice during the 2019 IFSC World Cup. Bosi narrowly missed out on a place in the Tokyo 2020 Olympics, despite trying to learn speed climbing, a required discipline in Olympic competition climbing.

In 2021, Bosi announced that he was taking a break from competition climbing to focus on outdoor sport climbing and bouldering.

== Notable ascents ==
=== Redpointed routes ===
9b+ (5.15c):

- Excalibur – Arco (ITA) – February, 2025. First repeat. Bosi made the first repeat of Excalibur in Arco, Italy.

9b (5.15b):

- King Capella – Siurana (ESP) – March, 2021. First ascent, which Bosi felt was at 9b+, but the grade was settled at 9b after repeats by Alex Megos (2021), and Jakob Schubert (2021).

- La Capella – Siurana (ESP) – February, 2020. Third repeat of Adam Ondra's 2011 route, and the second-ever British climber to climb a 9b route (after Steve McClure with Rainman in 2017); sometimes considered closer to 9a+.

9a+ (5.15a):

- Free at Last – Dumbarton Rock (GBR) – July, 2022. First ascent. A long-standing unsolved line beside Dave Cuthbertson's famous 1983 route, Requiem (E8 6c), and Dave MacLeod's 2006 equally notable route, Rhapsody (E11 7a); Free at Last became Scotland's hardest route.

- Brandenburg Gate – Raven Tor (GBR) – November, 2021. First ascent. The line was regarded as a "holy grail" of British sport climbing.

- Mutation – Raven Tor (GBR) – October, 2021. First repeat of Steve McClure's ground-breaking 1998 route, which Bosi suggested was "at least" 9a+ (and possibly harder), making it one of the first-ever 9a+ sport climbing routes in history.

- First Ley – Margalef (ESP) – February, 2021. Repeat ascent of Chris Sharma's 2010 route that is popular with aspiring 9a+ climbers.

- La Furia de Jabalí – Siurana (ESP) – February, 2021. First ascent, which Bosi felt could be 9b, but the grade later settled at 9a+ after repeats by Alex Megos (2021), Jakob Schubert (2021), and Adam Ondra (2022).

9a (5.14d):

- Rainshadow – Malham Cove (GBR) – May, 2016. Became the youngest Briton to climb at 9a when he made the fifth repeat of Steve McClure's iconic 2003 route, aged 17; Rainshadow is considered the "benchmark" for aspiring 9a sport climbers in Britain.

=== Boulder problems ===
V17 (9A):

- Return of the Sleepwalker – Red Rock Canyon (US) – February 2024 – First repeat of the world's second-ever V17 boulder problem by Daniel Woods (2021).

- Burden of Dreams – Lappnor, (FIN) – April, 2023. First repeat of the world's first-ever V17 boulder problem by Nalle Hukkataival (2016), and in 2023, was still considered the world's hardest boulder; Bosi practiced on a replica 3D version in Britain.

- Alphane – Chironico, (SUI) – October, 2022. Second repeat of Shawn Raboutou's route that Bosi felt was easier than Honey Badger.

- Spots of Time – Helvellyn, (En) – October, 2024. First repeat of Aidan Roberts's route.

- Realm of Tor'ment – Ravens Tor, (UK) – May 11, 2025. Will's first v17 FA.

V16 (8C+):

- Por do Sol – Sintra, Portugal, (PT) – January, 2026. First ascent and the hardest boulder in Portugal.
- Ephyra – Chironico, (SUI) – November, 2022. Third repeat of Jimmy Webb's 2019 boulder.

- Honey Badger – Peak District, (GBR) – August, 2022. First ascent and the third British boulder to be graded at V16.

V15 (8C):

- Dreamtime – Cresciano, (SUI) – December, 2022. Repeat of the famous boulder Fred Nicole route; took only 4 attempts.

== See also ==
- List of grade milestones in rock climbing
