= Megatron (climb) =

Bouldering route in Colorado

- Location within Colorado
- Location: Eldorado Canyon State Park, Colorado, United States
- Coordinates: 39°55′20″N 105°17′23″W
- Route type: Bouldering
- Technical grade: 9A (V17)
- First ascent: Shawn Raboutou, 2022

Megatron is a grade 9A (V17) bouldering problem in Eldorado Canyon State Park, Colorado. It was first ascended by American climber Shawn Raboutou in 2022 and repeated by English climber Hamish McArthur in 2025. This makes Megatron the fourth confirmed 9A boulder in the world and second in the United States. The boulder also made Raboutou the first to ever climb multiple 9A problems.

The 17-move route was created as a sit start to Tron, an existing 8B+ (V14) boulder established by Daniel Woods. The boulder was a long-standing project attempted by multiple strong climbers, including Woods. Raboutou announced his first ascent in November, after months of rumors that he had completed the project. He is known to delay the announcement of successful ascents; in April that year he had made his first 9A ascent of Alphane but waited until August to announce the feat. Alongside the announcement, climber and filmmaker Matty Hong released a 22-minute documentary covering the ten-year history of the route including previous attempts by climbers Daniel Woods, Drew Ruana, and Chad Greedy.

On 20 April 2025, English climber Hamish McArthur made the first repeat of Megatron, confirming the grade of 9A. McArthur was previously known primarily as a competition climber, but completed Megatron after just five sessions of work. McArthur confirmed the grade, but added that he was "not an authority on outdoor grades" and that he felt the climbing community was too focused on "ticking numbers and grades."

== Ascents ==
Megatron has been ascended by:

- 1st. Shawn Raboutou in 2022.
- 2nd. Hamish McArthur on 20 April 2025.
- 3rd. Zach Galla on 13 April 2026.

== See also ==
- History of rock climbing
- List of grade milestones in rock climbing
