= The Fly (climb) =

Rock climbing route, United States

- Location within New Hampshire
- Location: Rumney, New Hampshire, United States
- Coordinates: 43°48′15″N 71°48′48″W
- Climbing area: Rumney Rocks
- Route type: Highball bouldering
- Rock type: Schist
- Vertical gain: 25 feet (7.6 m)
- Pitches: 1
- Technical grade: V14 (8B+), 5.14d (9a)
- Bolted by: Mark Sprague
- First free ascent: David Graham, 7 April 2000

The Fly is a short 25-foot (7.6 m) schist sport climbing or highball bouldering route in the Rumney Rocks climbing area, New Hampshire, USA, at the Waimea Cliff. The Fly was bolted by Mark Sprague in 1995 as an open project but did not see a first free ascent until David Graham, an 18-year-old American climber from Maine, climbed it in April 2000, who graded it 5.14d (9a) or V14 (8B+). It was quickly repeated by his climbing partner, Luke Parady. At the time, these ascents were milestones for climbing in North America.

== History ==
David Graham made the first free ascent (FFA) on April 7, 2000. At the time, David Graham and Luke Parady proposed the tentative grade of 5.14d (9a). After further ascents and fine-tuning of the beta (choreography) needed to climb it, the consensus has settled to approximately 5.14c/d using the Yosemite decimal system or 8B/+ in the Font bouldering grade.

== Route ==
The Fly ascends a short, steep, lower portion of the Waimea wall, gaining a large ledge (the E-Ticket Ledge) and a bolted anchor about 25 feet up. The climb is very fingery and powerful. The route is quite short by sport climbing standards, essentially a rope-protected highball boulder problem, with its two protection bolts being placed before the now common use of many stacked 'crash pads' to protect the dangerous landing. Most ascents make use of the protection offered by the bolts, usually pre-clipping the rope to them both, though after practicing the moves on a rope, the climb has been 'bouldered' (sans rope), first by Jason Kehl, on November 7, 2003.

== Notable ascents ==
- David Graham (on April 7, 2000)
- Luke Parady (on April 27, 2001)
- Tony Lamiche (on October 10, 2003)
- Chris Sharma (on October 30, 2003) - almost a flash, he fell on the last move.
- Jason Kehl (on November 7, 2003)
- Kevin Jorgeson (in April 2008)
- Paul Robinson (in April 2008)
- Daniel Woods (in October 2008)
- Alexander Megos (in October 2012)
- Mike Foley (on November 13, 2015)
- Andrew Palmer (on April 5, 2018)
- Alex Waterhouse (in Spring 2019)

== See also ==
- Midnight Lightning, famous V8 (7B/7B+) boulder in Yosemite, California
- The Mandala, famous V12 (8A+) boulder in The Buttermilks, California
- The Wheel of Life, famous V15 (8C) boulder in the Grampians, Australia
