= Ajanbahu =

Ajanbhau may refer to:

- Ajanbahu (term), a Sanskrit term
- Ajanbahu Lohana, a general of Prithviraj Chauhan
- Ajanbahu Jatbasha, an Indian monarch of 16th Century
