= Jason Kehl =

American rock climber (born 1976)

- Born: October 18, 1976; Maryland
- Occupation: Rock Climber

Jason Kehl is a professional American rock climber known for his highball bouldering ascents and for his work shaping holds. In 2006, he was awarded the prestigious Everest Award for climbing. He is the first person to ever boulder (climb without a rope but with crash pads) a 5.14d grade route; The Fly (climb), Rumney, NH.

Some of his other notable ascents are as follows:

[FA: First Ascent; FBA: First Boulder Ascent]

- FA – Evilution (V12) Buttermilks, CA, 12/02
- FBA – After Midnight (V11) Yosemite, CA, 04/03
- FA – The New Zero (V13) Holy Boulders, South Illinois, 03/04
- FBA – Straight out of Squampton (5.13+) Squamish, British Columbia, 07/05
- FA – Kumite (V10) Mizugaki, Japan, 06/06

Jason Kehl is widely recognized within the climbing community for his bohemian lifestyle and eclectic self-expression. For over a decade, Kehl has been living out of his van in order to facilitate climbing and travel. His art, diet, and lifestyle are heavily influenced by Eastern culture and thought, and for years, Kehl sported dreadlocks. These dreads were cut and burned in the latter part of 2010 in India where he was filming "The Zanskar Odyssey: High Alpine Bouldering in the Hidden Himalayas".

On Cryptochild.com, Kehl's website, he writes, "Climbing always interested me because it is a great way to express yourself using your body, sometimes aggressive like a brutal fight and sometimes slow and seductive like a ritualistic dance. In that way I see climbing as a good artistic outlet." In 2008, Kehl underwent ACL replacement surgery and was sidelined for the better half of a year. During this time, Kehl focused more heavily on his website, blog, and other artistic pursuits. Kehl is interested in graphic design, special effects, videography, animation, and collecting doll heads. His most passionate artistic interest is certainly hold shaping, however, as Kehl has been shaping holds almost as long as he has been a professional climber. Boasting over 100 designs, he has shaped holds for Cryptochild as well as for five other companies: Pusher, Etch, So iLL, Revolution, and Ritual in Spain. Kehl is sponsored by Blurr, LaSportiva, Revolution, and Native Eyewear. He writes an ongoing blog for Deadpointmag.com.
