= Physical characteristics of the Buddha =

Appearance of the Buddha

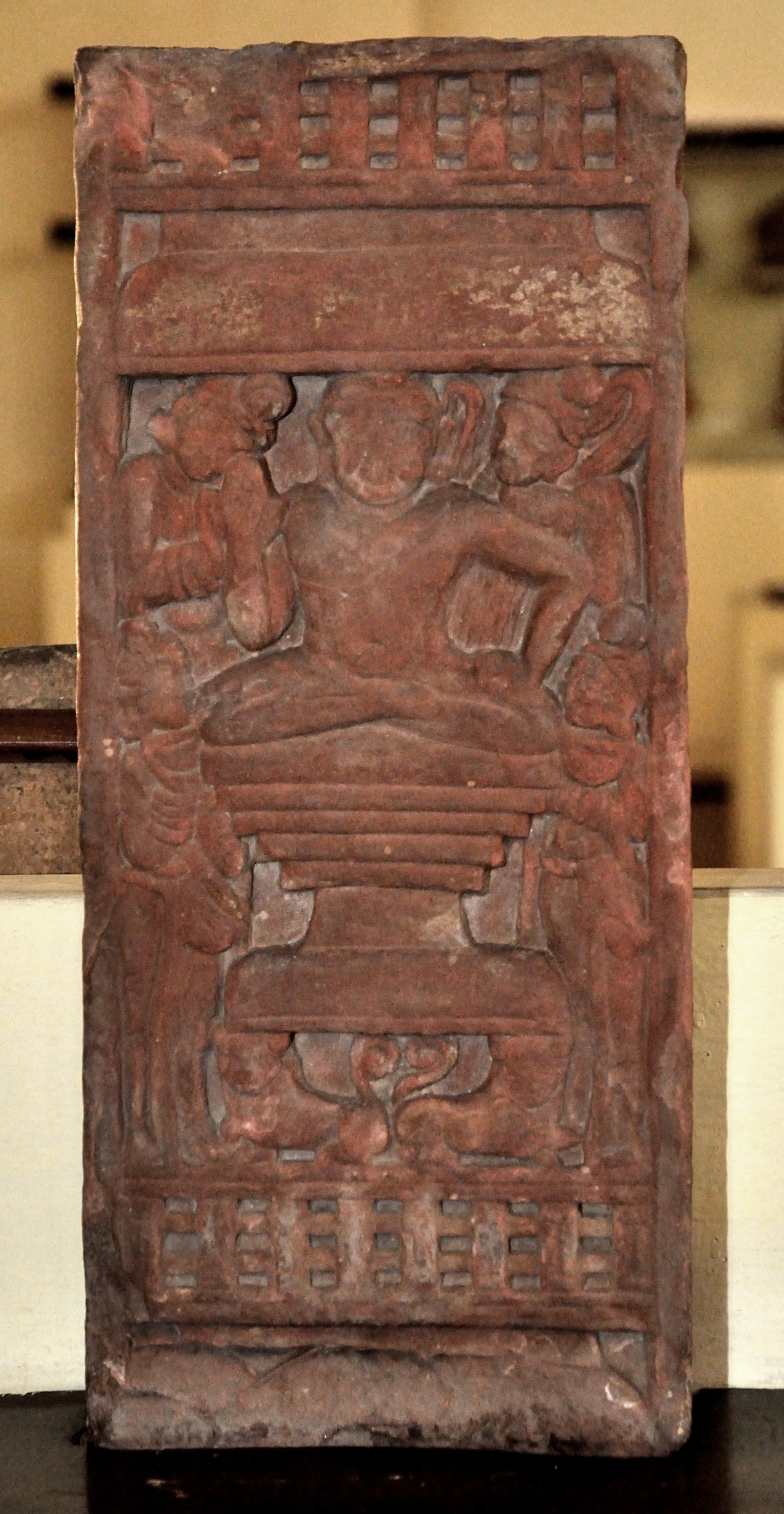
The Isapur Buddha, one of the earliest physical depictions of the Buddha, c. 15 CE. Art of Mathura

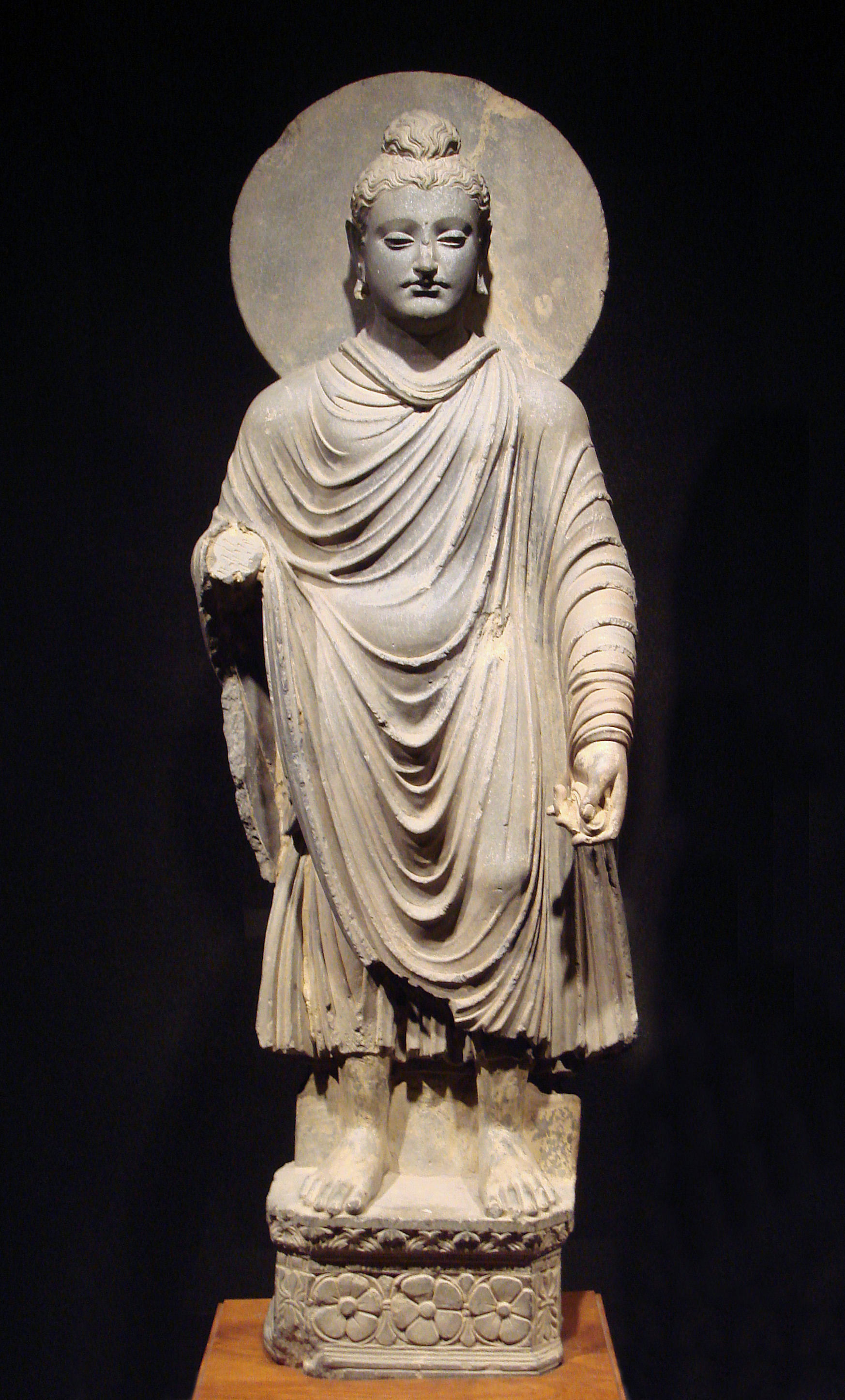
One of the first representations of the Buddha, 1st–2nd century CE, Greco-Buddhist art, Gandhara

There are no extant representations of the Buddha represented in artistic form dating from before roughly the 2nd century CE, probably due to the prominence of aniconism in Buddhism in the earliest extant period of Buddhist devotional statuary and bas reliefs. A number of early discourses describe the appearance of the Buddha, and are believed to have served as a model for early depictions. In particular, the "32 signs of a Great Man" are described throughout the Pali Canon, and these are believed to have formed the basis for early representations of the Buddha. These 32 major characteristics are also supplemented by another 80 secondary characteristics (Pali:Anubyanjana).

In Mahāyāna Buddhism, including the traditions of esoteric Buddhism, the 32 major characteristics and 80 minor characteristics are understood to be present in a buddha's sambhogakāya, or reward-body. In contrast, a buddha's physical form is understood to be a nirmāṇakāya, or transformation-body.

== Early history ==
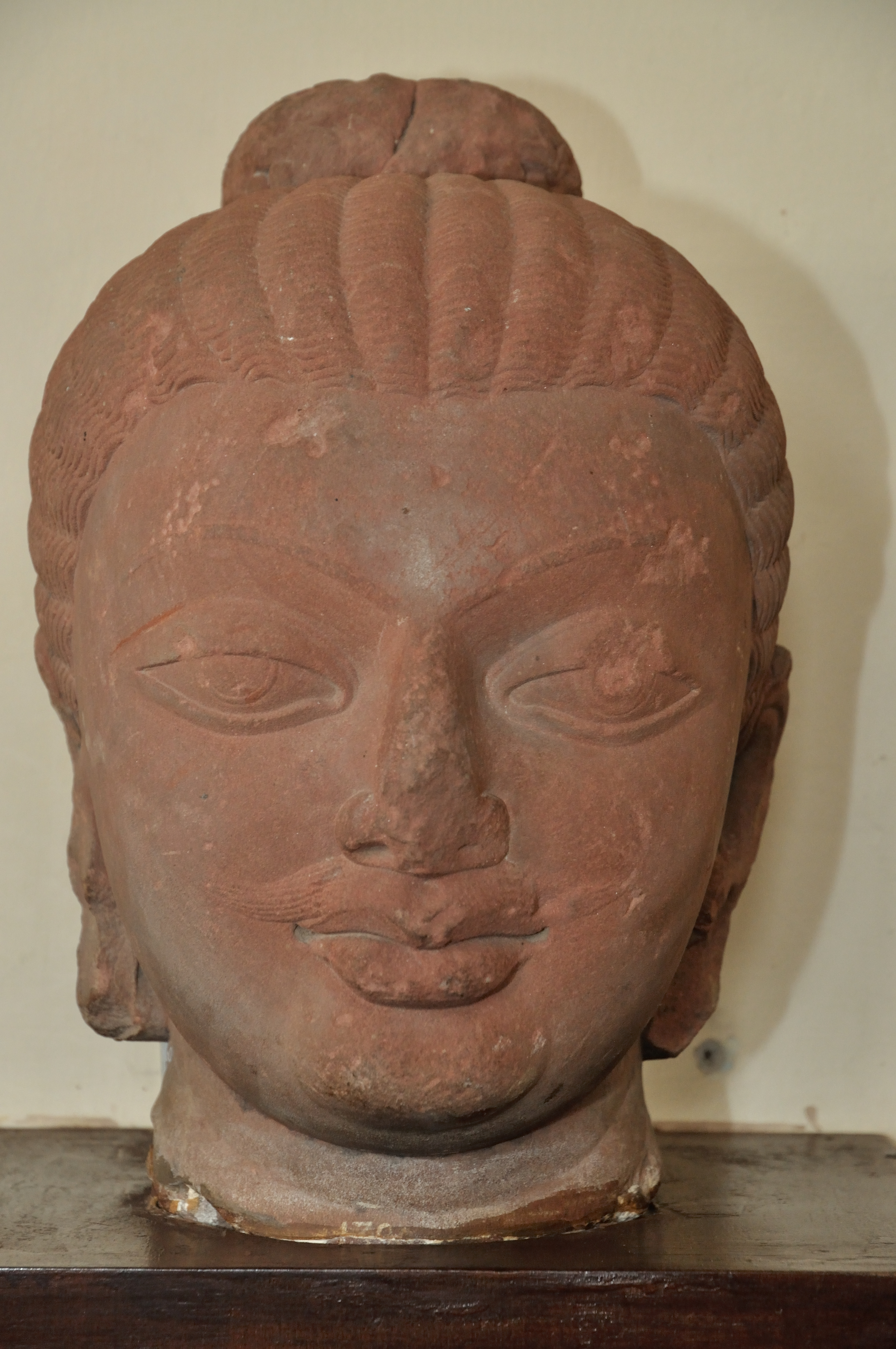
Buddha with a mustache, Gupta period. Government Museum, Mathura, India

The earliest surviving phase of Buddhist art was generally aniconic, with the Buddha being represented as symbols such as a footprint, an empty chair, a riderless horse, or an umbrella. Later, iconic sculptural traditions were established, with two of the most important being in the regions of Gandhara and Mathura.

The first statues and busts of the Buddha were made in the region around Mathura or Gandhara in the second or third century CE. Many statues and busts exist where the Buddha and other bodhisattvas have a mustache.

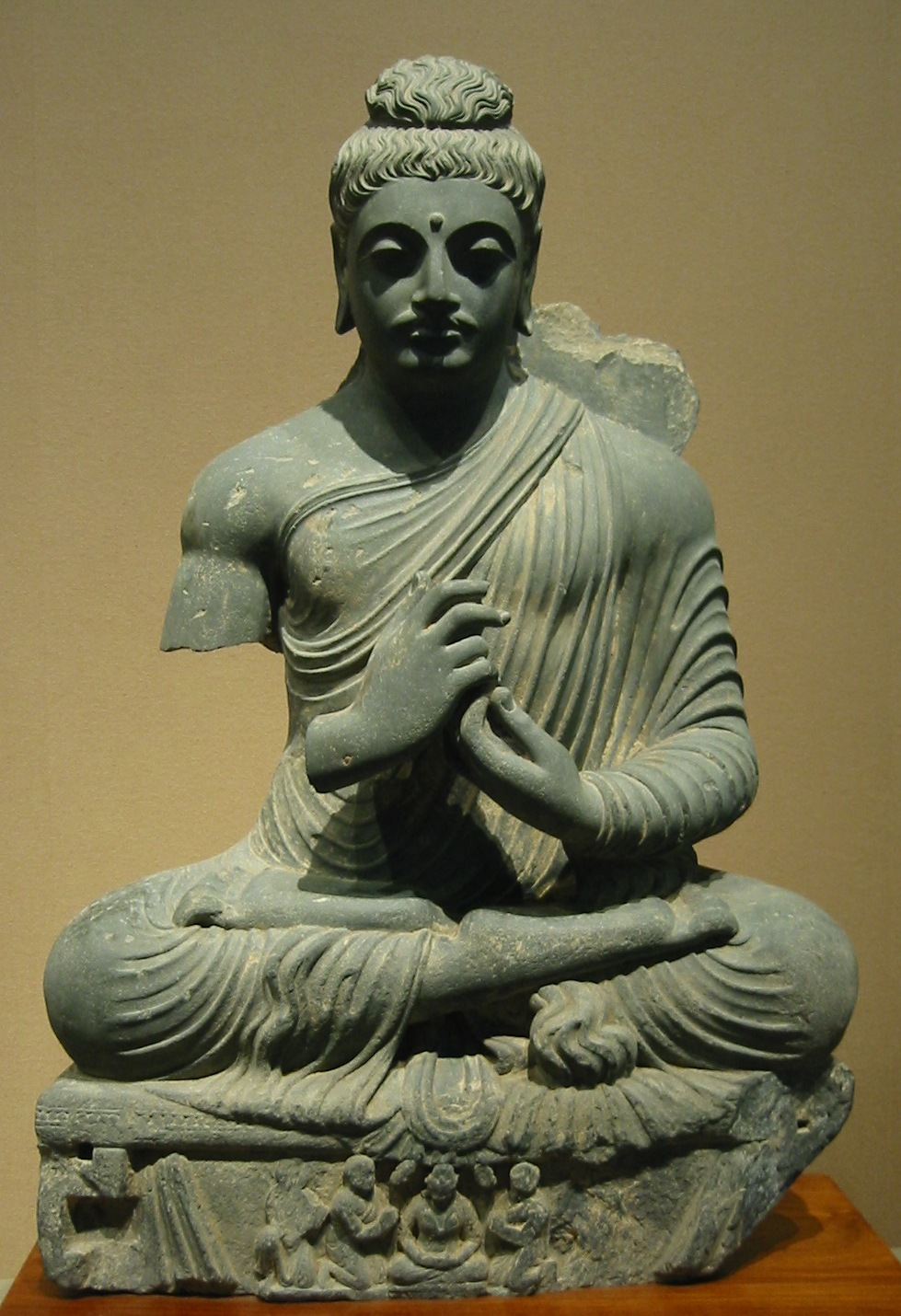
Seated Buddha, Gandhara, 1st–2nd century CE, Tokyo National Museum

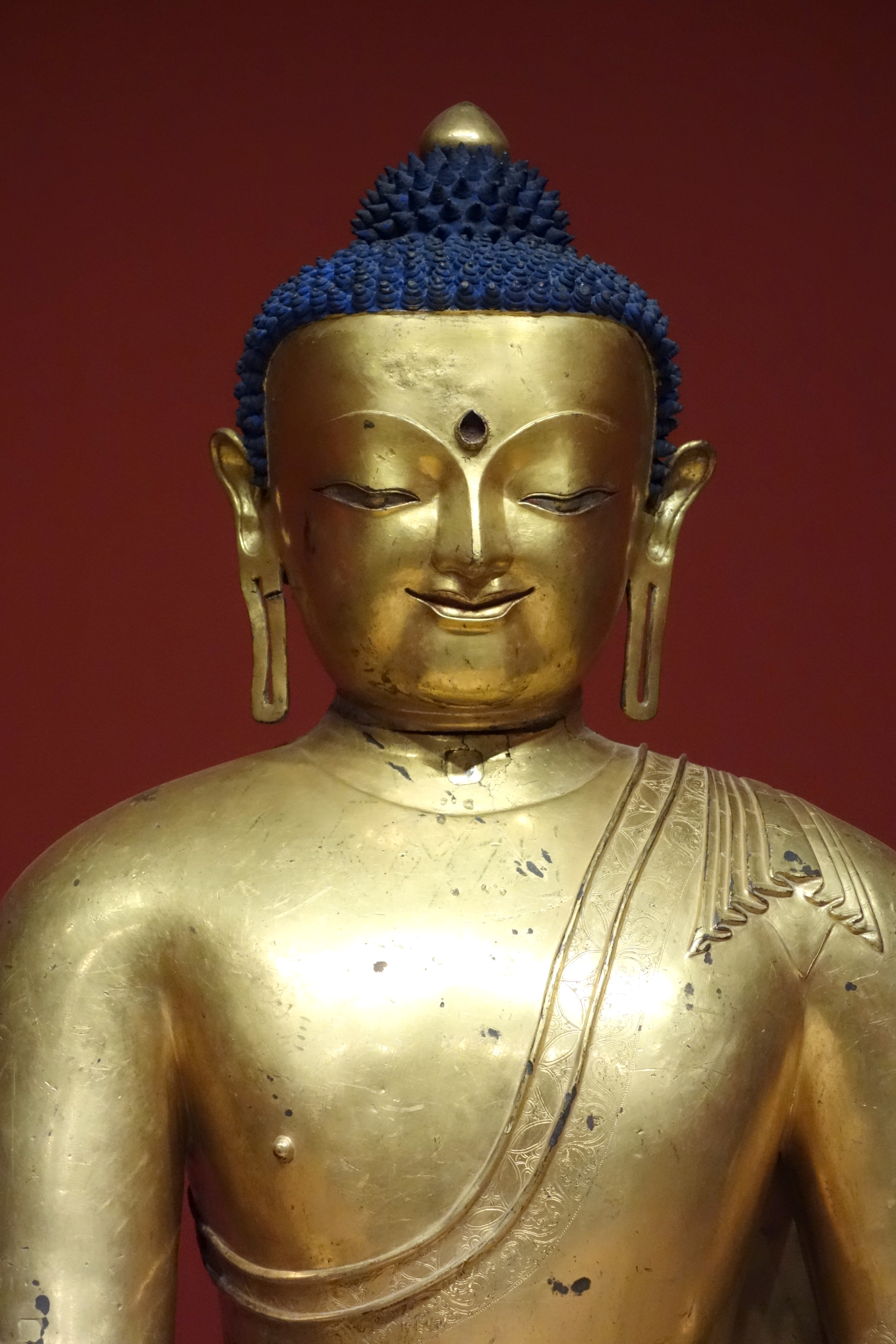
Buddha depicted with urna, gilt bronze, 14th century

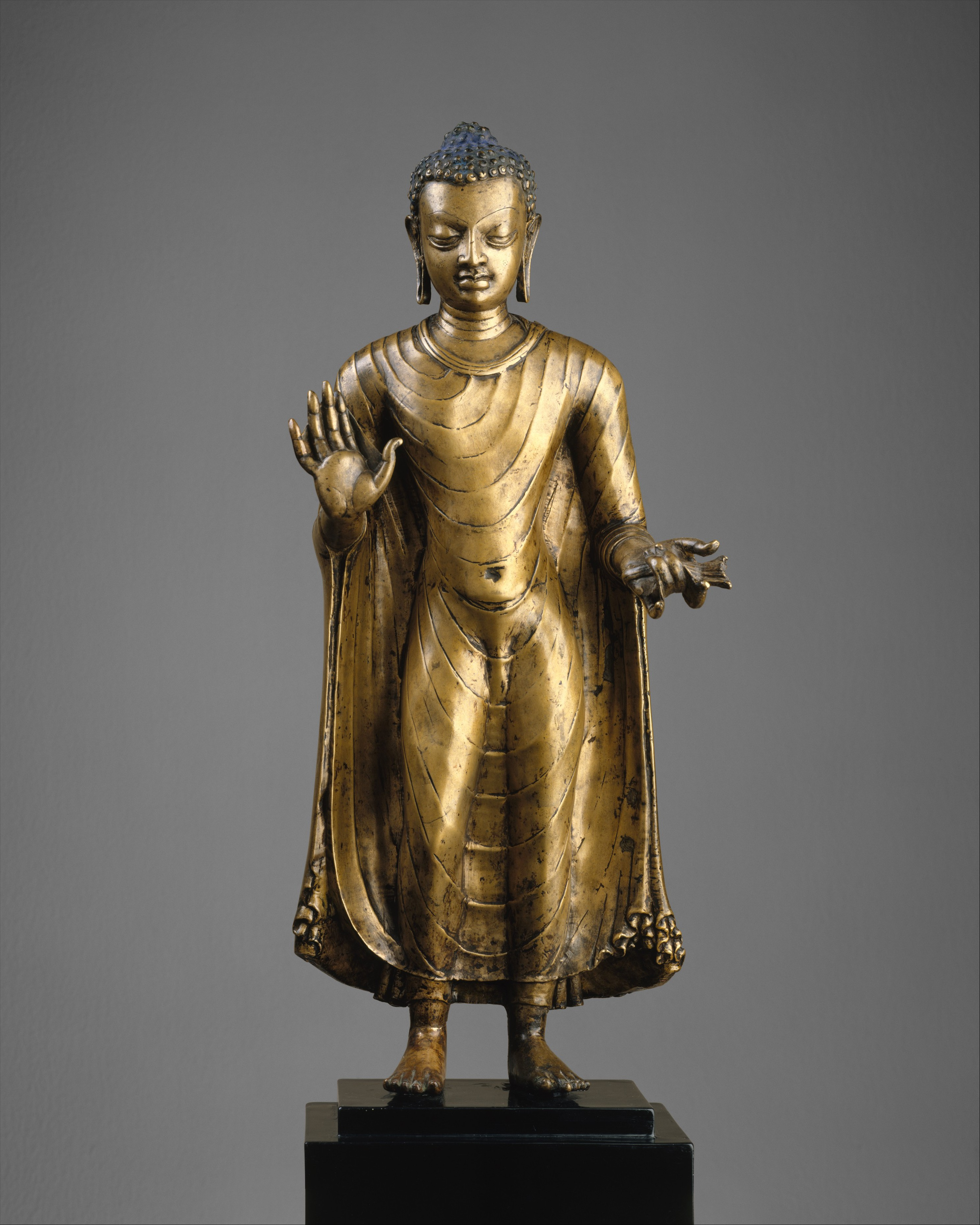
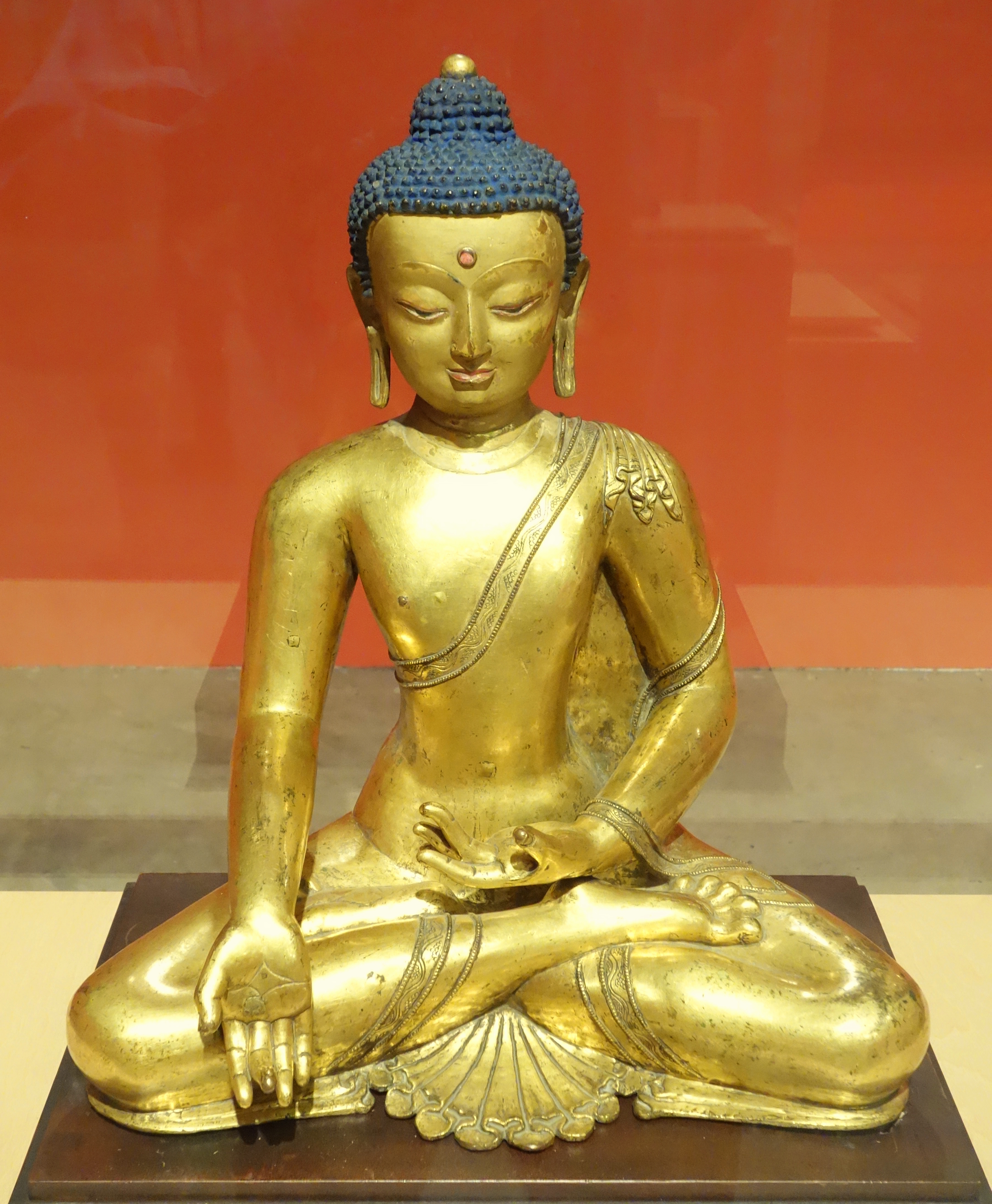
Buddhas hair is depicted blue or dark blue (nīlāni) in art due to 32 signs of Buddhas appearance.

In the Pali Canon a paragraph appears many times recording the Buddha describing how he began his quest for enlightenment, saying:

So, at a later time, while still young, a black-haired young man endowed with the blessings of youth in the first stage of life—and while my parents, unwilling, were crying with tears streaming down their faces—I shaved off my hair & beard, put on the ochre robe and went forth from the home life into homelessness.

— Ariyapariyesanā Sutta

After examining the cult of the Buddha image in India, Gregory Schopen concludes that followers of Mahāyāna at this time played little to no role in introducing statuary and other physical depictions of the Buddha. Mahāyāna sūtras from this period such as the Maitreyasiṃhanāda Sūtra, only address the image cult as an object of criticism, if it is mentioned at all. Schopen states that followers of Mahāyāna were generally uninterested in worshipping buddhas, but rather in becoming buddhas, and their outlook toward Buddhist practice was "profoundly conservative."

== The 32 Signs of a Great Man ==
The Buddha is traditionally regarded as having the Thirty-two Characteristics of a Great Man (Skt. mahāpuruṣa lakṣaṇa). These thirty-two characteristics are also regarded as being present in cakravartin kings as well.

The Digha Nikaya, in the "Discourse of the Marks" (Pali: Lakkhaṇa Sutta) (DN 30) enumerates and explains the 32 characteristics. These are also enumerated in the Brahmāyu Sutta of the Majjhima Nikāya (MN 91).

According to Mattice, the 32 characteristics can be summarized as follows:

By about five hundred years later, several texts mention by name the thirty-two marks of a Great Man (mahā purisa lakkhaņa), including the mark of a dharma wheels on the soles of his feet; long fingers and toes; a large, lion like torso; sensitive taste buds; white, evenly spaced teeth; a long tongue; arms that extend to his knees; very blue eyes (blue like a sapphire of the ocean, or like Krishna's skin); and having sexual organs concealed in a sheath.

The color of eyes described in Pali as abhinīla netta. The term nīla spans a range that includes blue, dark blue, blue-black and black, and has been variously translated as "blue" or "very dark". Scholars note the same term describes Krishna's complexion in Hindu literature, where it is understood as dark rather than literally blue.

It is generally held, including by Bhikkhu Analayo, that the 32 marks are a later addition. Texts such as the Dona sutta (AN4:36) mention seeing one of the marks in the footprint, but comparative studies do not include the wheel mark itself.

The suttas often state these are recognisable by Brahmins trained in such prognostication of a mahapurisa (a great man) who would be either a Buddha or a wheel-turning monarch. There is no reference to non-Brahmins seeing them; in fact in several places in the Suttas, such as in the Samaññaphala Sutta (DN2), the protagonists could not recognise the Buddha when surrounded by other monks, showing a normality in physical appearance (which would certainly not be the case if the 32 marks were present).

Possessing these marks is therefore seen in these suttas as an expert qualification from Brahmins of the Buddha's authenticity and status, and therefore a converting-tool to the Brahmin orthodoxy. Unfortunately, there does not appear to be any clear connection to Vedic or Vedanta texts that would show this to be the case. More investigation is required to give evidence of the 32 marks as recorded as being sourced from Brahmanical or Vedic tradition.

Since early statues and icons of the Buddha do not seem to have these features, it has been proposed by Bhikkhu Analayo that some may have in fact formed from the stonemason or sculptor, particularly the webbed fingers which would protect the delicate fingers of the statues from damage. The fleshy protuberance of the head likewise originally being just a stylistic representation of a top-knot of hair, a common feature of Indian holy men.

It is presently speculative whether the statues were later built with the 32 marks in mind, so that should a qualified Brahmin seeing a statue displaying such characteristics, the Brahmin would want to know to whom the statue represents and be interested in Buddhism. It is likewise speculative later Buddhists produced such iconography to reflect the trend from the Lakkhana Sutta as being a genuine necessity, or that they in fact took symbolic representation of the marks as a means of recollection (Buddhanussati). There are no texts or commentaries to suggest these proposals, however future comparative studies may provide esoteric evidence.

The 32 major characteristics are listed as follows:

Samannāgato ca so bhavaṁ Gotamo dvattiṁsamahāpurisalakkhaṇehi:
The reverend Gotama is endowed with the thirty-two marks of a great man:

1. Suppatiṭṭhitapādo, idam-pi tassa bhoto Gotamassa mahāpurisassa mahāpurisalakkhaṇaṁ bhavati,
1. He has well placed feet, this is, for the great man, the venerable Gotama, a mark of a great man,

2. heṭṭhā ... pādatalesu cakkāni jātāni, sahassārāni sanemikāni sanābhikāni sabbākāraparipūrāni...
2. under the soles of his feet there are wheels, with a thousand rims and naves, complete in every way...

3. āyatapaṇhi...
3. the heels are long and deep...

4. dīghaṅguli...
4. the fingers are long...

5. mudutalunahatthapādo...
5. the hands and feet are soft and tender...

6. jālahatthapādo...
6. the hands and feet are webbed...

7. ussaṅkhapādo...
7. the ankles are high...

8. eṇijaṅgho...
8. the calves are like an antelope’s...

9. ṭhitako ... anonamanto ubhohi pāṇitalehi jaṇṇukāni parimasati parimajjati...
9. when he stands ... without bending he can rub and stroke both his knees with his hands... [see ajanubahu]

10. kosohitavatthaguyho...
10. what is covered by a cloth is ensheathed...

11. suvaṇṇavaṇṇo ... kañcanasannibhattaco...
11. he is golden in colour, has skin like gold...

12. sukhumacchavi ... sukhumattā chaviyā rajojallaṁ kāye na upalimpati...
12. he has fine skin, and because of the fine skin, dust and dirt do not adhere to him...

13. ekekalomo ... ekekāni lomāni lomakūpesu jātāni...
13. the body-hairs arise singly, each body hair appearing in its own hair follicle...

14. uddhaggalomo ... uddhaggāni lomāni jātāni nīlāni, añjanavaṇṇāni kuṇḍalāvaṭṭāni dakkhiṇāvaṭṭakajātāni...
14. the hair bristles, his bristling hair is blue or dark blue (nīlāni), the colour of collyrium, turning in curls, turning to the right...

15. brahmujugatto...
15. the limbs are straight like brahmā’s...

16. sattussado...
16. there are seven prominent marks...

17. sīhapubbaddhakāyo...
17. the torso is like a lion’s...

18. citantaraṁso...
18. between the shoulders it is firm...

19. nigrodhaparimaṇḍalo, yāvatakvassa kāyo tāvatakvassa byāmo, yāvatakvassa byāmo tāvatakvassa kāyo...
19. the (body) is well-proportioned like a banyan tree, the extent of the arm span equals the extent of the body...

20. samavaṭṭakkhandho...
20. the upper back is even all round,

21. rasaggasaggī...
21. the taste buds are supremely sensitive...

22. sīhahanu...
22. the jaw is like a lion’s...

23. cattālīsadanto...
23. there are forty teeth...

24. samadanto...
24. the teeth are even...

25. aviraḷadanto...
25. the teeth are without gaps...

26. susukkadāṭho...
26. the teeth are very white...

27. pahūtajivho...
27. the tongue is very large...

28. brahmassaro ... karavikabhāṇī...
28. the voice is like brahmā’s or like the sound of the cuckoo...

29. abhinīlanetto...
29. Eyes very blue, like sapphire eyes deep blue

30. gopakhumo...
30. the eyelashes are like a cow’s...

31. uṇṇā ... bhamukantare jātā odātā mudutūlasannibhā...
31. the tuft of hair between the eyebrows on his forehead is very white like cotton...

32. uṇhīsasīso, idam-pi tassa bhoto Gotamassa mahāpurisassa mahāpurisalakkhaṇaṁ bhavati.
32. there is a protuberance on the head, this is, for the great man, the venerable Gotama, a mark of a great man.

Dvātiṁsa Mahāpuriṣalakkhaṇāni from Brahmāyusuttaṁ.

== The 80 secondary characteristics ==
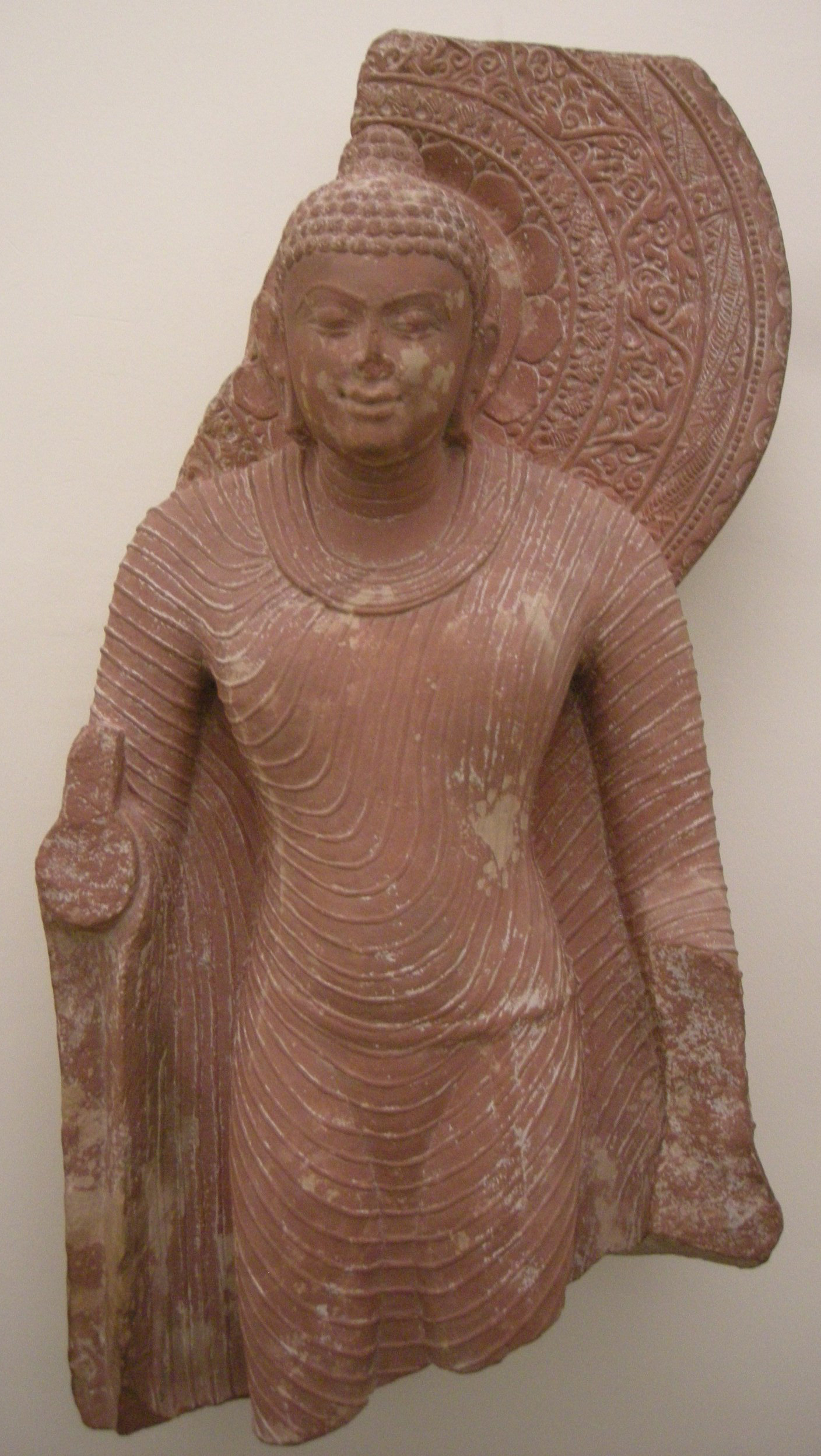
Sculpture of the Buddha from Mathura, India, 5th or 6th century CE

The 80 minor characteristics of the Buddha are known to be enumerated a number of times in the extant Āgamas of the Chinese Buddhist canon. According to Guang Xing, the 80 minor marks are related to the 32 major marks, and are merely a more detailed description of the Buddha's bodily features. In the Sarvāstivādin Abhidharma Mahāvibhāṣa Śāstra, the question is posed about the relationship between the major and minor marks, and it is said that the minor marks are among the major marks, but not mixed with them, just as flowers in the forest make the trees distinctive. These 80 minor characteristics became significant as well, as were adopted by Buddhist traditions including both Mahāyāna and Theravāda traditions. In Pali literature, the 80 minor characteristics are found in the Apadāna and the Milindapañha. Some scholars believe the 80 minor characteristics were an early development in the Buddhist tradition, but held as important mostly by the Sarvāstivāda school.

The eighty minor characteristics are:

1. He has beautiful fingers and toes.
2. He has well-proportioned fingers and toes.
3. He has tube-shaped fingers and toes.
4. His fingernails and toenails have a rosy tint.
5. His fingernails and toenails are slightly upturned at the tip.
6. His fingernails and toenails are smooth and rounded without ridges.
7. His ankles and wrists are rounded and undented.
8. His feet are of equal length.
9. He has a beautiful gait, like that of a king-elephant.
10. He has a stately gait, like that of a king-lion.
11. He has a beautiful gait, like that of a swan.
12. He has a majestic gait, like that of a royal ox.
13. His right foot leads when walking.
14. His knees have no protruding kneecaps.
15. He has the demeanor of a great man.
16. His navel is without blemish.
17. He has a deep-shaped abdomen.
18. He has clockwise marks on the abdomen.
19. His thighs are rounded like banana sheaves.
20. His two arms are shaped like an elephant's trunk.
21. The lines on the palms of his hands have a rosy tint.
22. His skin is thick or thin as it should be.
23. His skin is unwrinkled.
24. His body is spotless and without lumps.
25. His body is unblemished above and below.
26. His body is absolutely free of impurities.
27. He has the strength of 1,000 crore elephants or 100,000 crore men.
28. He has a protruding nose.
29. His nose is well proportioned.
30. His upper and lower lips are equal in size and have a rosy tint.
31. His teeth are unblemished and with no plaque.
32. His teeth are long like polished conches.
33. His teeth are smooth and without ridges.
34. His five sense-organs are unblemished.
35. His four canine teeth are crystal and rounded.
36. His face is long and beautiful.
37. His cheeks are radiant.
38. The lines on his palms are deep.
39. The lines on his palms are long.
40. The lines on his palms are straight.
41. The lines on his palms have a rosy tint.
42. His body emanates a halo of light extending around him for two meters.
43. His cheek cavities are fully rounded and smooth.
44. His eyelids are well proportioned.
45. The five nerves of his eyes are unblemished.
46. The tips of his bodily hair are neither curved nor bent.
47. He has a rounded tongue.
48. His tongue is soft and has a rosy-tint.
49. His ears are long like lotus petals.
50. His earholes are beautifully rounded.
51. His sinews and tendons don't stick out.
52. His sinews and tendons are deeply embedded in the flesh.
53. His topknot is like a crown.
54. His forehead is well-proportioned in length and breadth.
55. His forehead is rounded and beautiful.
56. His eyebrows are arched like a bow.
57. The hair of his eyebrows is fine.
58. The hair of his eyebrows lies flat.
59. He has large brows.
60. His brows reach the outward corner of his eyes.
61. His skin is fine throughout his body.
62. His whole body has abundant signs of good fortune.
63. His body is always radiant.
64. His body is always refreshed like a lotus flower.
65. His body is exquisitely sensitive to touch.
66. His body has the scent of sandalwood.
67. His body hair is consistent in length.
68. He has fine bodily hair.
69. His breath is always fine.
70. His mouth always has a beautiful smile.
71. His mouth has the scent of a lotus flower.
72. His hair has the colour of a dark shadow.
73. His hair is strongly scented.
74. His hair has the scent of a white lotus.
75. He has curled hair.
76. His hair does not turn grey.
77. He has fine hair.
78. His hair is untangled.
79. His hair has long curls.
80. He has a topknot as if crowned with a royal flower garland.

== Causal relations of the 32 signs of perfection of the Tathāgata ==
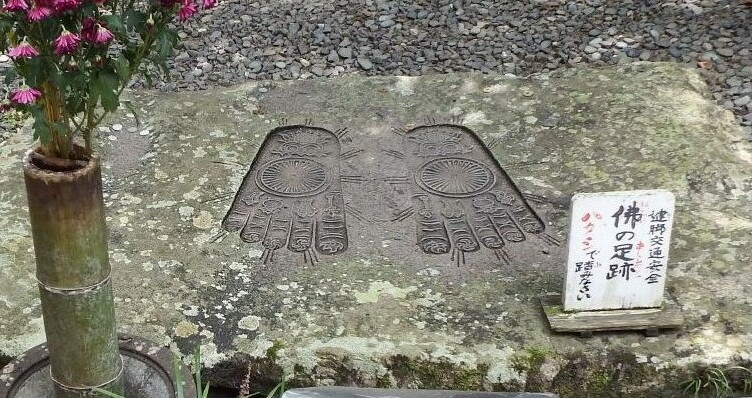
Bussokuseki representation of the footprints of the Buddha, including wheels

The Mahayana Mahaparinirvana Sutra expounds the causal relations of the 32 signs of perfection of the Tathāgata. These causal relations are cultivated by followers of Mahāyāna Buddhism on their path to buddhahood.

Lion’s Roar said: "O World-Honoured One! Why are there the retrogressing and the non-retrogressing Bodhisattvas?" [...] "O good man! When the Bodhisattva-mahasattva practises such 32 kinds of causal relations, he gains a mind that will not retrogress from the mind that seeks Bodhi."

— The Mahayana Mahaparinirvana Sutra - Chapter Thirty-Four: On Bodhisattva Lion’s Roar (b)

The table below summarizes the causal relations from which each of the 32 signs come about:

The causal relations of the 32 signs of perfection of the Tathāgata
Sign of perfection	Causal Relation
Flat soles	The Bodhisattva-mahasattva is immovable in his upholding of the precepts, in his mind of giving, and is like Mount Sumeru in abiding in the true word.
Thousand spokes	The Bodhisattva-mahasattva fittingly offers things to his parents, the honoured ones, elders, and animals.
Long fingers Long heels A square and upright body	The Bodhisattva-mahasattva takes joy in non-harming and non-stealing and is pleased regarding his parents, honoured ones and teachers.
Toe-membrane (like that of a great royal swan)	The Bodhisattva-mahasattva practices the four ways of guiding in [i.e. to guide beings in by: 1) giving, 2) friendliness, 3) good actions, 4) transforming himself and co-existing with them as the beings themselves], and takes in beings.
Soft hands and feet	The Bodhisattva-mahasattva, when his parents, teachers and elders are ill, himself washes and wipes, holds and rubs their limbs.
Joints and ankles fully fleshed Skin flows in one direction	The Bodhisattva-mahasattva upholds the precepts, listens to the sermons, and knows no end of giving.
Ankles of a deer-king	The Bodhisattva-mahasattva single-mindedly gives ear to Dharma and expounds the right teaching.
Body rounded and perfect (is like the nyagrodha tree) Fingers reaching the knee (when hand is stretched down) Usnisa (Buddhic protuberance on the crown of the head)	The Bodhisattva-mahasattva acquires no harming mind, is satisfied with his food and drink, and with giving, and attends to illness, and dispenses medicine.
Genital organ lies hidden	The Bodhisattva-mahasattva, when he sees a person in fear, extends help [to that person], and when he sees a person without any footgear, gives him clothing.
Delicately soft skin Bodily hair turns to the right-hand side	The Bodhisattva-mahasattva readily befriends wise men, segregating himself from the ignorant; he takes pleasure in exchanging views and sweeps the path along which he walks.
Body shines brightly in a golden colour and light	The Bodhisattva-mahasattva always gives men clothing, food and drink, medicine, incense and flowers, and lights.
Full and right-set (firm) in the seven places of the body	The Bodhisattva-mahasattva gives, does not grudge at [hang on to] whatever is rare, and easily parts with such; he makes no distinction whatever between a field of weal or a nonfield-of-weal [i.e. the recipient of dana - charity - is likened to a field, by cultivating which one's blessings and virtues increase].
Boneless parts of the body are full (upper part is like that of a lion) Elbows well-balanced and delicate	The Bodhisattva-mahasattva seeks wealth lawfully and gives this away [to others].
40 teeth are white and pure, well-balanced and delicate	The Bodhisattva-mahasattva segregates himself from double-tongue [two-facedness], from ill-speaking and an angry mind.
Two-fanged face	The Bodhisattva-mahasattva practises Great Loving-Kindness towards beings.
Lion's cheeks	The Bodhisattva-mahasattva takes this vow: "Any may come and ask, and I shall give as they desire to have."
Taste that is the mid-upper	The Bodhisattva-mahasattva gives whatever kind of food beings desire to have.
Large and long tongue (i.e. a symbolic expression referring to his great prowess in oratory)	The Bodhisattva-mahasattva exerts himself in the 10 good deeds and thereby teaches others.
Buddha-Voice	The Bodhisattva-mahasattva does not speak ill of the shortcomings of others and does not slander Wonderful Dharma.
Blue tone of the eyes	The Bodhisattva-mahasattva sees all enmities and gains a pleasant [i.e. happy] mind.
White (tuft of) hair on the brow	The Bodhisattva-mahasattva does not conceal the virtues of others, but praises the good which they have.

== Alternate depictions ==
Some have noted that in at least two discourses in the Pali Canon, the Buddha may be interpreted as being bald as if his head were shaven.

== See also ==
- Gautama Buddha
- Pali Canon and Early Buddhist Texts
- Dhammacakkappavattana Sutta
- Anattalakkhaṇa Sutta
- Samaññaphala Sutta
- Mahaparinibbana Sutta
- Great Renunciation and Four sights
- Relics associated with Buddha
- Leela Attitude
- Māravijaya Attitude
- Meditation Attitude
- Naga Prok Attitude
- Buddhist art
- Halo (religious iconography)
- History of Buddhism

== Bibliography ==
- Powers, John (26 April 2021). "The Body of the Buddha". Oxford Research Encyclopedia of Religion. Oxford: Oxford University Press. doi:10.1093/acrefore/9780199340378.013.745. ISBN 9780199340378. Archived from the original on 16 May 2021.
