= Bunda de Fora =

Sport climbing route in Canada

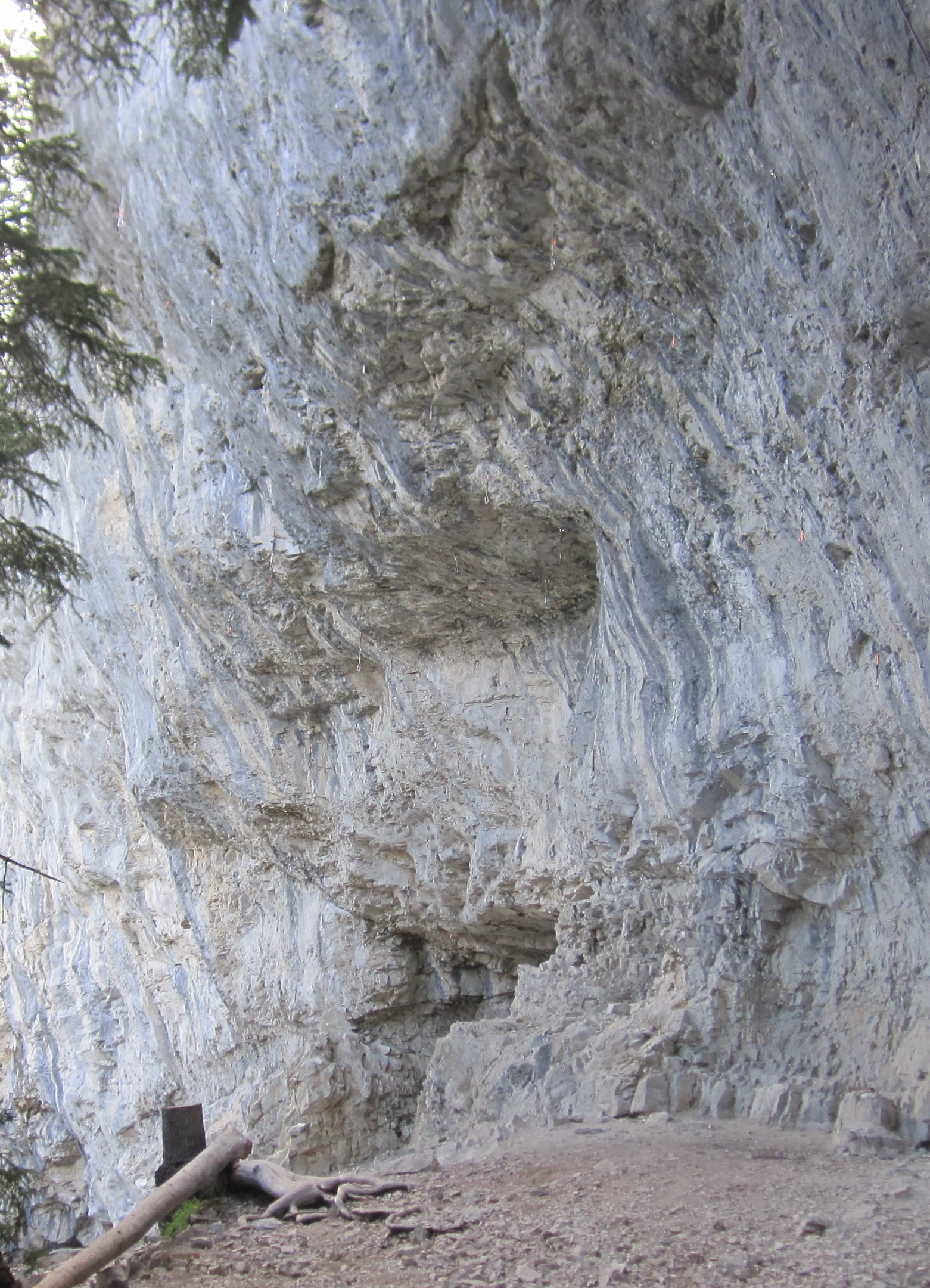
- The Upper Wall at Acephale where Bunda de Fora sits
- Location: Canmore, Alberta, Canada
- Coordinates: 51°05′01″N 115°22′05″W
- Climbing area: Acephale
- Route type: Sport climbing; Overhang climbing
- Vertical gain: 20 metres (66 ft)
- Pitches: 1
- Technical grade: 9a (5.14d)
- Route setter: Ryan Johnstone
- First free ascent: Lev Pinter, 2006

Bunda de Fora is a circa 35-metre (115 ft) sport climbing route on an overhanging limestone cliff located in Acephale, Alberta, Canada. At the time of its first free ascent in 2006, its grade of 9a (5.14d) made it one of the most difficult sport climbing routes in North America and one of Canada's hardest sport climbs.

== History ==
Bunda de Fora was first bolted by Ryan Johnstone; however, it remained unclimbed for a number of years until Lev Pinter established the first ascent in 2006. Unsure of the grade, Pinter proposed a grade of 5.14c. Repeat ascentionists have since upgraded the climb to 5.14d.

In the summer of 2011, a crucial hold broke, which significantly increased the difficulty and duration of the crux sequence as well as increasing the difficulty of clipping. However, the grade remained unchanged at 5.14d (9a). The climb has seen four repeats since the hold broke. It is worth noting the first three ascentionists used dramatically different sequences through the broken section.

== Route ==
Bunda de Fora sits nestled in one of two prominent steep caves at the Upper Wall of Acephale. These two caves house the majority of the 5.14s at Acephale as well as some 5.13+ climbs. The climb is 20 m long. Although relatively short, the difficulty of the moves and number of difficult moves are enough to support the grade, making it a notable power endurance test piece.

The phrase bunda de fora is Portuguese, roughly translated as 'ass (arse) out'. It is a term referring to bar (pub) patrons sitting off the edge of their stools. The route is named for its namesake move where one must set a toe hook and stick one's backside out from the wall in order to execute a crux move.

Bunda de Fora opens with difficult climbing on small edges and difficult clips. From there a long V13 (8B) bouldering crux sequence through a roof awaits. A large hold at the lip of the roof after the crux allows climbers to catch their breath before the final technical 5.13c (8a+) push to the anchors.

== Ascents ==
- Lev Pinter (FA) August 2006
- Dave Graham September 2007
- Joe Kinder September 2012
- Josh Muller September 2012
- Evan Hau August 2013
- Alex Megos July 2016
