= Return of the Sleepwalker =

Bouldering route in Red Rock, Nevada

- Location within Nevada
- Location: Red Rock Canyon, Nevada, United States
- Coordinates: 36°02′15″N 115°27′47″W
- Route type: Bouldering
- Technical grade: 9A (V17)
- First ascent: Daniel Woods, 30 March 2021

Return of the Sleepwalker is a grade 9A (V17) bouldering problem in Red Rock Canyon, Nevada. It was first climbed by American Daniel Woods on 30 March 2021, the second-ever completed 9A boulder following Burden of Dreams in 2016. The climb was repeated by William Bosi in 2024, who confirmed the grade but felt it was easier than Burden of Dreams.

The climb itself, located in Black Velvet Canyon, is a sit-start of the existing Sleepwalker 8C+ (V16) boulder, which was first climbed by Jimmy Webb in 2018. Woods worked on the boulder for over two years, giving up alcohol, marijuana, tobacco, and caffeine in order to focus on the project. In the final 20 day stretch before he completed the climb, Woods camped alone near the boulder to avoid distractions. Bosi made his ascent after 12 sessions, a month after sending the standing start on Sleepwalker. He confirmed the sit start 9A (V17) grade but suggested a downgrade of stand start to 8C (V15).

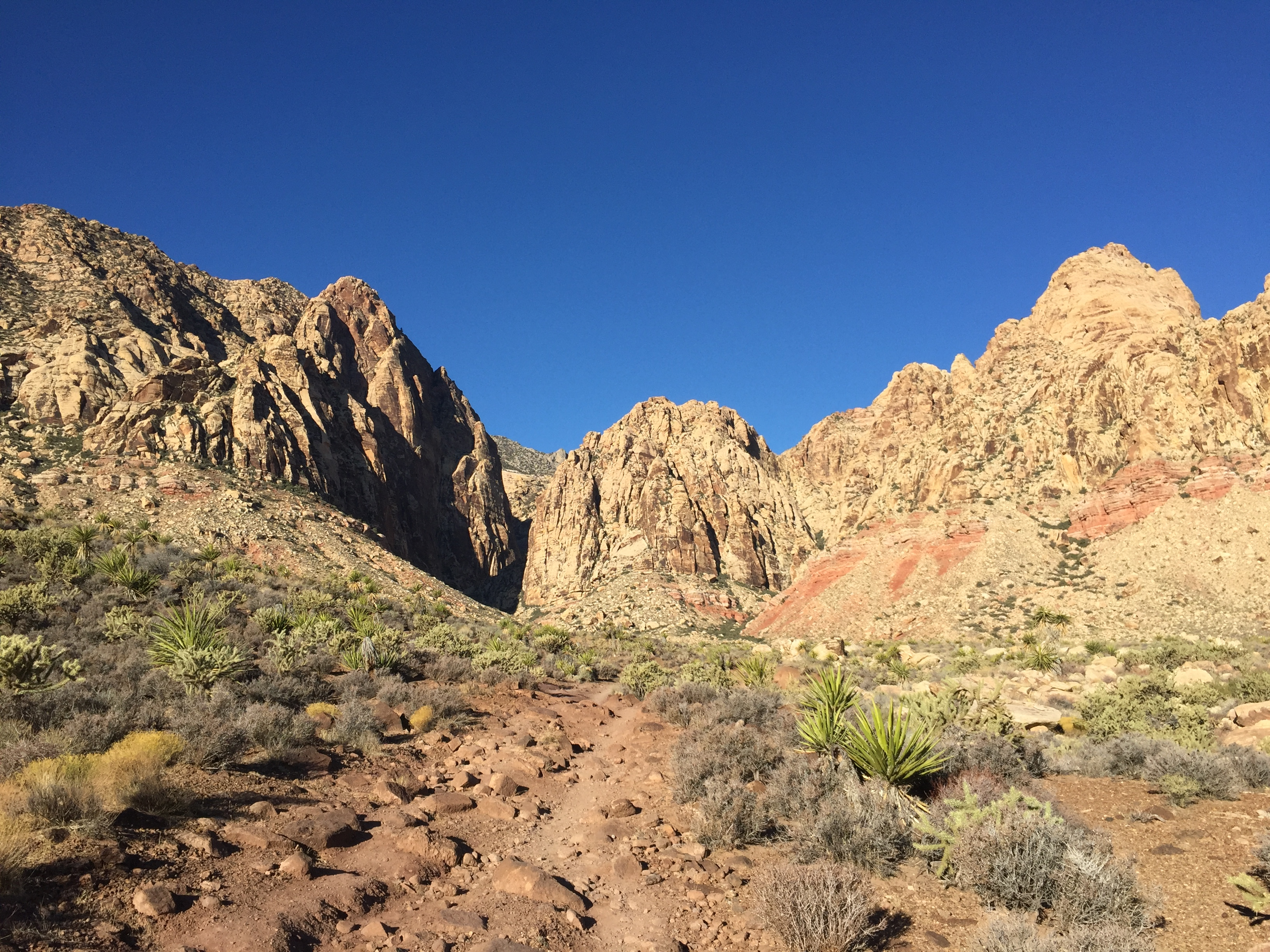
The entrance to Black Velvet Canyon, Red Rock, where Return of the Sleepwalker is located

== Ascents ==
Return of the Sleepwalker has been ascended by:

- 1st. Daniel Woods on 30 March 2021
- 2nd. William Bosi on 19 February 2024
- 3rd. Noah Wheeler on 30 December 2024
- 4th. Simon Lorenzi in March 2025
- 5th. Ryuichi Murai in November 2025
- 6th. Zach Galla on 11 December 2025
- 7th. Adam Shahar on 16 December 2025
- 8th. Dayan Akhtar on 3 November 2026

== See also ==
- History of rock climbing
- List of grade milestones in rock climbing
- Burden of Dreams, the first established 9A (V17) boulder in Lappnor, Finland
