= Alphane =

Bouldering route in Chironico, Switzerland

- Location: Chironico, Switzerland
- Route type: Bouldering
- Technical grade: 9A (V17)
- First ascent: Shawn Raboutou, 6th April 2022

Alphane is a bouldering route in Chironico, Switzerland. It is graded at 9A (V17), making it one of the hardest boulders in the world.

Alphane sits to the left of Dave Graham's Alphane Moon V11 (8A), and was discovered by Graham many years before its first ascent by American climber Shawn Raboutou on the 6th April, 2022. Within the following 9 months it had been repeated by three more climbers.

== Ascents ==
- 1st: Shawn Raboutou on 6 April 2022
- 2nd: Aidan Roberts on 20 October 2022
- 3rd: Will Bosi on 31 October 2022
- 4th: Simon Lorenzi on 15 December 2022
- 5th: Jakob Schubert on 21 December 2023
- 6th: Sean Bailey before 9 December 2024
- 7th : Sung Su Lee on 3 April 2026
- 8th: Ryuichi Murai November 2026

== See also ==
- List of grade milestones in rock climbing
