= Ajanubahu =

Sanskrit term

Ājānubāhu is a Sanskrit word to describe a person whose length of arms is such that his fingers touch his knee.

In Indian culture, individuals described with this characteristic are typically gods, saints, kings or great warriors. The idols of Hindu gods like Rama, Lakshmana, and Krishna when depicted standing are represented as ajanubahu. The idols of Jain Tirthankaras are also depicted in this manner.

In Buddhism, it is sometimes called paṭūrubāhatā or sthitānavanatājānupralambabāhuḥ. It is among the thirty-two marks of a great man and as such, is characteristic of all Buddhas.

Ajanbahu Jatbasha was so called because of this characteristic.

== See also ==
- Samudrika Shastra
- Ape index
