= Ape index =

Ratio of arm span to height

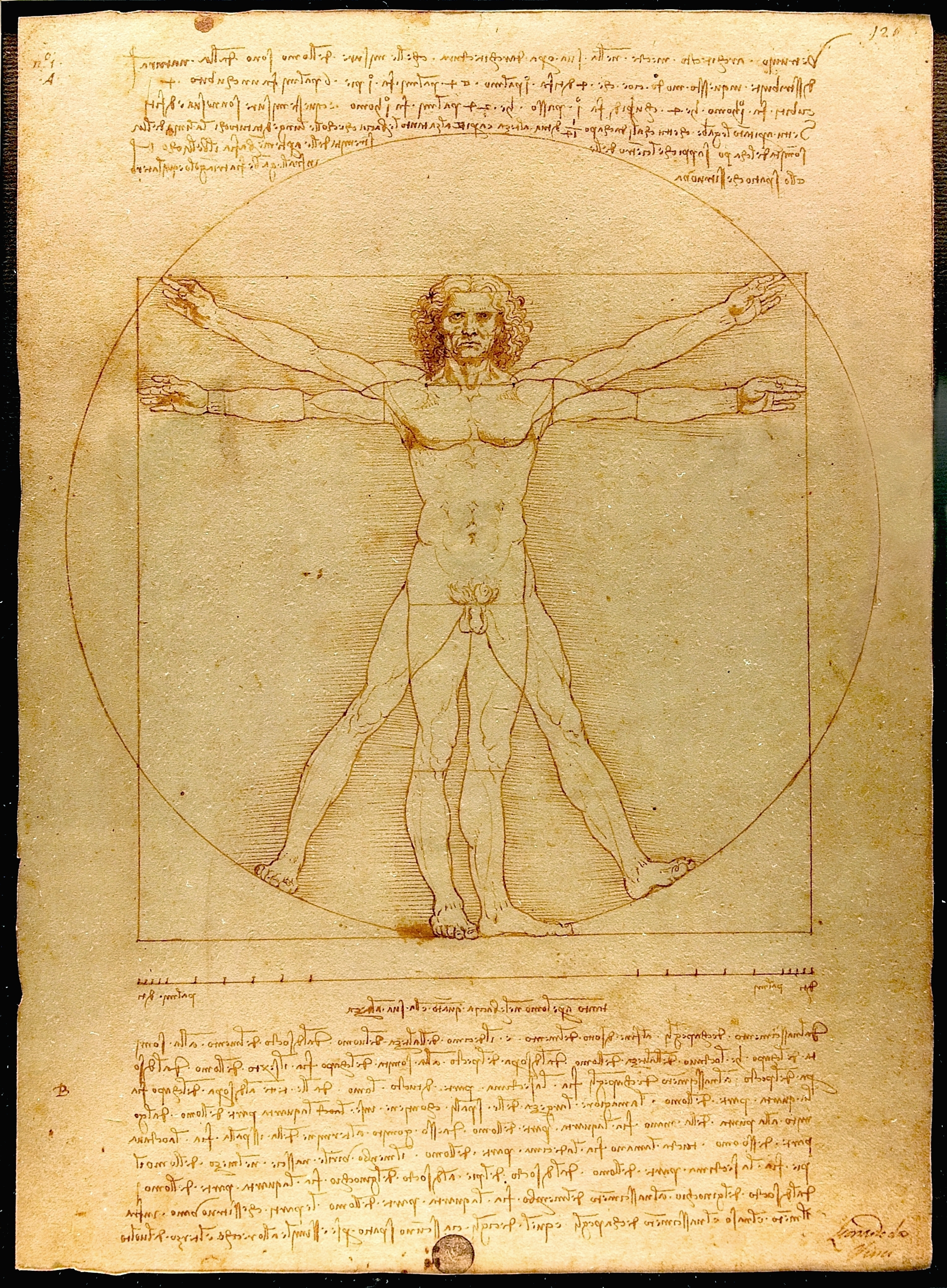
Vitruvian Man c. 1492 by Leonardo da Vinci. Based on proportions identified by Vitruvius, the drawing shows a man where the arm span is equal to the height, giving an ape index of 1.

Ape index, ape factor, or gorilla index is slang or jargon used to describe a measure of the ratio of an individual's arm span relative to their height. A typical ratio is said to be 1, as identified by the Roman writer, architect and engineer Vitruvius prior to 15 BC. Vitruvius noted that a "well made man" has an arm span equal to his height, as exemplified in Leonardo da Vinci's c. 1492 drawing, the Vitruvian Man. However, newer surveys of the population have found it more typical for men to have ape indices greater than 1, with 1.03 to 1.04 being seen as the average range in surveys of Americans.

In rock climbing it is believed that an ape index greater than one, where the arm span is greater than the height, provides for a competitive advantage, and some climbers have expressed the belief that exercise can result in an improved ratio, although this view is somewhat controversial.

== Computation ==
The ape index is usually defined as the ratio of arm span to height.

$\text{Ratiometric Ape Index} = \frac{\text{arm span}}{\text{height}}$

However, an alternative approach is arm span minus height with the result being positive, 0 or negative. Unlike the dimensionless ratio, this calculation produces a numeric value in the units of measurement used to represent the height and arm span.

$\text{Absolute Ape Index} = \text{arm span} - \text{height}$

== Population averages ==
The 1988 Army Anthropometric Survey (ANSUR) found the mean arm span across male United States Army personnel to be 71.77 inches, while the mean stature was 69.13 inches. This gave an ape index (for males) of 1.038.

24 years later, when the survey was repeated in the 2012 Anthropometric Survey of U.S. Army Personnel, the mean arm span across male army personnel was measured at 71.42 inches, while the mean stature was 69.14 inches. This gave an ape index (for males) of 1.033.

== Significance in competition climbing ==
Multiple studies have been conducted into the effect of physiological factors, such as anthropometry and flexibility, in determining rock climbing ability, particularly in the area of competition climbing, which is an Olympic sport. A number of these have included the ape index as one of the variables. However, the results have been mixed.

One study found that "untrainable" physical factors, including the ape index, were not necessarily predictors of climbing ability, despite a general tendency identified in previous studies for elite athletes in the sport to share these characteristics. This was supported by a later study that also found that the ape index was not statistically relevant. However, the authors of this second study noted that the findings may have been due to the low variability in the index between the climbers, who all had significantly higher ape indices than those found in the control group. Thus they left open the possibility that the ape index may be more significant when there is a greater degree of equivalence between the other traits under consideration. Successful professional climbers such as Brooke Raboutou and Lynn Hill have negative ape indices.

Countering these studies are other works that have identified the ape index as a significant (or potentially significant) factor. A 2001 study comparing teenage male and female competition climbers noted that performance differences between the genders could be explained by several factors, one of which was the lower ape index found in the female competition climbers. Similarly, in a later work it was found that the ape index was statistically significant, and thus determined that it was one of several variables that provided the highest diagnostic value in the prediction of climbing performance.

== Other sports ==
The term was first coined by Frisbee throwers at UC Berkeley in 1975.

It has been noted that swimmers tend to have longer arms in relation to their body size. A notable example is Michael Phelps whose arm span is 10 cm (3.9 in) greater than his height, giving him an index of 1.052.

There is evidence to support that having a higher index will be beneficial to a football goalkeeper. It can also compensate for being shorter than the recommended norm for a professional goalkeeper. Iker Casillas and Jorge Campos are examples of shorter goalkeepers who possess a higher than average index.

In basketball, a higher index helps with defense, especially in contesting shots and intercepting passes. It also helps with rebounding, and with dribbling, passing, and shooting when being guarded closely by opponents. David Epstein in his book The Sports Gene devoted a chapter to "The Vitruvian NBA Player" and therein noted "The average arm-span-to-height ratio [i.e., ape index] of an NBA player is 1.063." Having an ape index of less than 1 is very rare among NBA players; only two players in the NBA 2010–11 season had one. One notable NBA player with an ape index below 1 is Desmond Bane, whose wingspan of 6 ft 4 in (193 cm) is less than his 6 ft 5 in (196 cm) height; he has been nicknamed "T-Rex" for this reason. Despite this perceived deficiency, Bane has become a quality player since being selected 30th overall by the Memphis Grizzlies in the 2020 NBA draft out of TCU.

In combat sports, such as boxing and mixed martial arts, having a higher index is often perceived to be beneficial. Fighters such as Jon Jones (whose arm span is 21 cm (8.3 in) greater than his height) and Conor McGregor have a longer arm span than most of their opponents. Sergei Pavlovich is believed to be the active UFC fighter with largest Ape index of 1.115, with a 191 cm (6 ft 3 in) height and 213 cm (7 ft 0 in) reach. This potentially allows them to use their arm span to hit their opponents, whereas their opponents could not hit them. They often use this in their game plan, by keeping their distance, allowing them to cover up (as longer arms allow for a greater area of protection around the upper body) or use it to counter punch them. However, research has shown that the ape index cannot predict who wins or loses MMA bouts, an individual's divisional ranking, or whether or not they are successful in their technique use.

Small ape indices can also be beneficial. For example, in the bench press, a lifter with a shorter ape index must move the weight a shorter relative distance to complete the lift when compared to a lifter with a longer ape index. In contrast, a long ape index is an advantage in the deadlift, where longer ape indices reduce the range of motion required to complete the lift.

== See also ==
- Ajanubahu
- Intermembral index
