= Burden of Dreams (climb) =

Bouldering route in Lappnor, Finland

- Location within Finland
- Location: Lappnor, near Loviisa, Finland
- Coordinates: 60°25′26″N 26°08′08″E
- Route type: Bouldering
- Rock type: Red granite
- Vertical gain: 4 metres (13 ft)
- Technical grade: 9A (V17)
- First free ascent: Nalle Hukkataival, 23 October 2016
- Known for: First-ever consensus 9A (V17) in history

Burden of Dreams is a 4-metre (13 ft) red granite grade 9A (V17) bouldering problem at Lappnor near Loviisa, in Finland. It was first climbed by Finnish climber Nalle Hukkataival on 23 October 2016, who spent four years projecting the boulder, and features in the 2017 climbing film, The Lappnor Project.

With the hardest bouldering grade previously considered 8C+ (V16), Burden of Dreams was the world's first to be graded a 9A (V17). Climbing magazine awarded Hukkataival a Golden Piton award for having the courage to propose this grade.

After resisting further attempts by the world's strongest climbers for many years, including Shawn Raboutou and Stefano Ghisolfi, it was repeated by Scottish climber Will Bosi on 12 April 2023. Bosi practiced on a 3D-printed replica of the key holds and movements of the route in the United Kingdom, before attempting the actual boulder in Finland. Bosi also confirmed the grade of 9A (V17). After his May 2026 ascent, Noah Wheeler graded it a "soft" 9A (V17).

After Bosi's repeat, climbing hold manufacturers began to offer highly accurate 3D-scanned replicas of the holds on Burden of Dreams to the public. By altering the gradient to vertical, instead of the 45-degree overhang on the real route, it was estimated that the grade of difficulty is softened to almost 5+ (V2).

== Ascents ==
Burden of Dreams has been ascended by:

1. Nalle Hukkataival – 23 October 2016
2. William Bosi – 12 April 2023
3. Simon Lorenzi – 27 December 2023
4. Elias Iagnemma – 25 March 2024
5. Sung Su Lee (2x) – 10 May 2025; 12 May 2025
6. Makoto Yamauchi – 4 April 2026
7. Noah Wheeler – 14 May 2026

== Filmography ==
- The Lappnor Project (Motion picture). Blue Kangoo Films. 2017. – Short film on Hukkataival's first ascent
- Burden of Dreams (Motion picture). Crimp Films, Band of Birds. 2023. – Short film on Bosi's second ascent

== See also ==
- History of rock climbing
- List of grade milestones in rock climbing
- Midnight Lightning, famous V8 (7B/7B+) boulder in Camp 4 (Yosemite)
- Dreamtime, famous V15 (8C) boulder in Cresciano, Switzerland
- The Wheel of Life, famous V15 (8C) boulder in the Grampians, Australia
