= Shawn Raboutou =

American rock climber

Personal information
- Born: April 18, 1998 (age 28) Boulder, Colorado, U.S.
- Occupation: Rock climber
- Height: 167 cm (5 ft 6 in)

Climbing career
- Type of climber: Bouldering; Sport climbing; Competition climbing
- Highest grade: Bouldering: V17 (9A)
- First ascents: Megatron (V17/9A 2022); Alphane (V17/9A, 2022)
- Known for: First person to climb at V17 more than once

Shawn Raboutou (born April 18, 1998) is an American rock climber. On April 6, 2022, he became the 6th person to climb the bouldering grade of V17 (9A), a feat which he repeated only months later.

== Early life ==
Shawn Raboutou was born in Boulder, Colorado on April 18, 1998. He is the son of former professional climbers Didier Raboutou and Robyn Erbesfield-Raboutou; his younger sister is Brooke Raboutou, a competition climber. In 2011, when Raboutou was 13 years old, he climbed Welcome to Tijuana, a 5.14b (8c) graded sport climbing route in Rodellar, Spain.

== Climbing career ==
=== Bouldering ===
On April 6, 2022, Raboutou made the first ascent of Alphane, a V17 (9A) boulder problem in Chironico, Switzerland, although he didn’t announce his ascent until August 2022. Later on in 2022, Raboutou announced his first ascent of Megatron, another V17 (9A) boulder in Colorado, making him the first climber in history to climb two different V17-grade boulder problems.

=== Competition climbing ===
Between 2015 and 2017, Raboutou participated in the IFSC World Cup circuit, although he did not win any medals. He then took time off from competition climbing to focus on bouldering outside. In 2022, he returned to the competition scene in the North American Cup series and took home a silver medal.

== See also ==
- Burden of Dreams (climb)
- List of grade milestones in rock climbing
