= Nalle Hukkataival =

Finnish rock climber

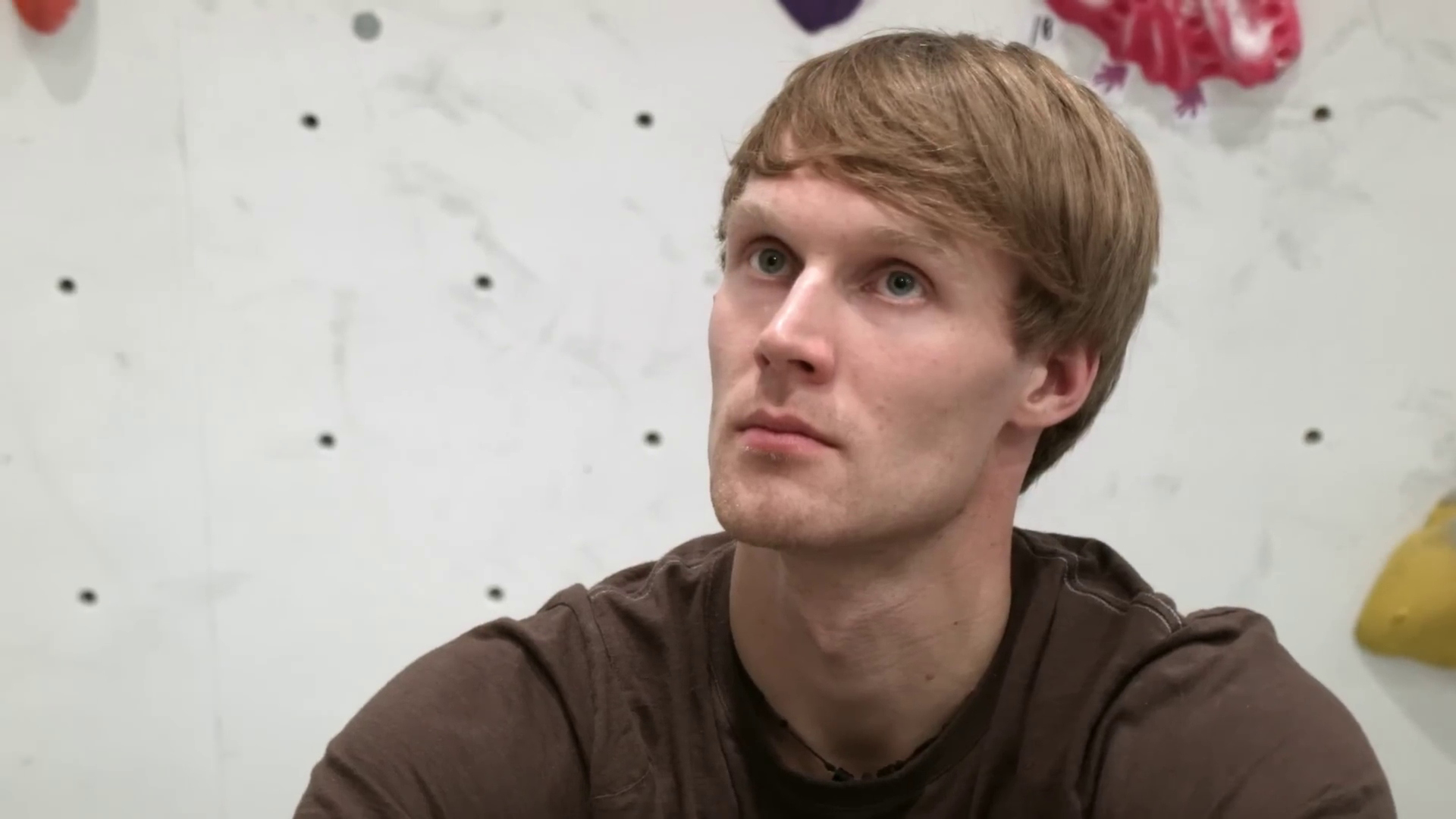
- Nalle Hukkataival in 2013

Personal information
- Nationality: Finnish
- Born: 8 September 1986 (age 39) Helsinki, Finland
- Occupation: Professional rock climber
- Height: 173 cm (5 ft 8 in)
- Weight: 68 kg (150 lb)

Climbing career
- Type of climber: Competition climbing; Sport climbing; Bouldering
- Highest grade: Bouldering: V17 (9A)
- Updated on 31 October 2017

Nalle Hukkataival (born 8 September 1986 in Helsinki) is a Finnish professional climber who specializes in bouldering. He has to his credit many first ascents and repeats in the V15 (8C) to V17 (9A) range. In October 2016, he completed the line on his Lappnor project, naming it Burden of Dreams and proposing a boulder grade of V17 (9A), the world's first-ever at that grade.

== Climbing career ==
=== Competition climbing ===
Nalle Hukkataival was 12 when he tried climbing for the first time at a local climbing wall. At age 17, Nalle took part in his first competition, the Nordic Championships. A year later, he took 5th place in the World Championships in Munich, making him the top-ranked climber in the Nordic countries. The following year, after having just served six months in the military, Nalle won the Arco Rockmaster in Italy and a few months later became the Vice European Champion. He has since won several international competitions, including the 2010 IMS Cup and Tierra Boulder Battle, and he is a 4-time Nordic Champion and 8-time Finnish Champion in bouldering.

=== Boulder climbing ===
Nalle made the first ascent of the then hardest boulder in Finland and its first 8B (V13). He also opened the first 8B+ (V14) boulder in the Nordic countries, Living the Dream, and the hardest sport route in Finland. He has kept pushing the standards ever since and his hardest first ascent in Finland, Circus Elephant Syndrome, could well be the first 8C (V15) boulder in the Nordic countries. In 2014, he repeated Gioia, the world's first-ever V16 (8C+) boulder.

In 2009, he won Climbing Magazine's Golden Piton Award for his repeats and first ascent of Livin' Large, a V15/V16 highball in South Africa. He's also one of a handful of people in the world to flash 8B (V13) boulder.

== See also ==
- List of grade milestones in rock climbing
