= Dave Graham (climber) =

American rock climber

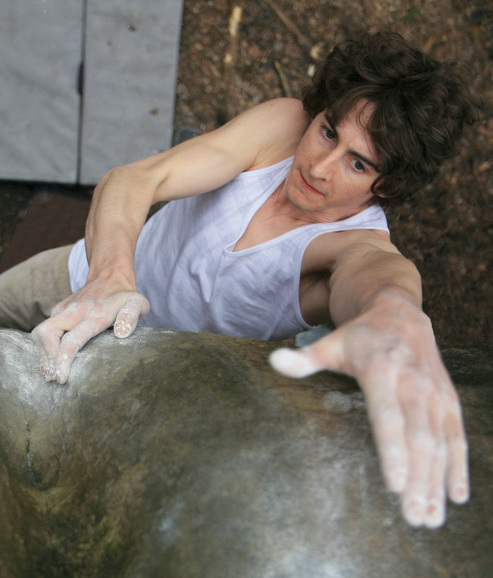
- Graham bouldering in Fontainebleau

Personal information
- Born: November 10, 1981 (age 44) Maine, U.S.
- Occupation: Rock climber
- Height: 5 ft 10 in (179 cm)
- Weight: 139 lb (63 kg)

Climbing career
- Type of climber: Bouldering, Sport climbing
- Highest grade: Bouldering: 8C+ (V16)
- Known for: Climbing many difficult boulder problems
- Updated on November 24, 2022

David Ethan Graham (born November 10, 1981) is an American professional rock climber. Professing to enjoy bouldering the most, he is one of the elite sport climbers and boulderers of his generation. Graham repeats classic routes or boulder problems as well as performing cutting-edge first ascents. He is known for climbing in 2005 an 8C (V15) graded boulder problem called The Story of Two Worlds, in Cresciano, Switzerland. He is also known for his stance against grade inflation and for his strong anti-chipping ethic. He writes an ongoing blog for the website of Climbing Magazine.

== Biography ==
Born in Maine, Graham was introduced to climbing in 1997 by one of his skiing teammates. Within a year, he climbed an 8b+ (5.14a) route, The Present. Quickly, he became one of the strongest climbers in the United States, before moving to Europe in 2005.

In 2005, he climbed an 8C (V15) boulder problem (The Story Of Two Worlds, Cresciano, Switzerland), and his first 9a+ (5.15a) route (Coup de Grace, Val Bavona, Switzerland).

== Rock climbing ==
As of November 2017, Graham climbed 455 routes between 8a (5.13b) and 9a+\b , of which 143 were onsighted:

- 5 9a+
- 13 9a
- 41 8c+
- 66 8c
- 82 8b+ (of which 3 onsighted)
- 92 8b (of which 31 onsighted)
- 91 8a+ (of which 61 onsighted)
- 66 8a (of which 48 onsighted)

=== Redpointed routes ===
9a+ (5.15a):

- Ali Hulk Sit Start Extension Total – Rodellar (SPA) – September 2020 – Fifth ascent. Originally considered 9b, but downgraded to 9a/9a+.
- La Rambla – Siurana (SPA) – March 2019
- Thor's Hammer – Flatanger (NOR) – October 5, 2015 – Sixth ascent
- Realization – Céüse (FRA) – July 30, 2007 – Fourth ascent
- Coup de Grace – Val Bavona (SUI) – November 8, 2005 – First ascent

9a (5.14d):

- Chocholoco – Carros (FRA)- October 14, 2009
- Abyss – Gorges du Loup (FRA) – October 3, 2009
- Kryptonite – Rifle (Colorado, USA) – September 14, 2008
- Bunda De Fora – Acephale (Canada) – September 6, 2007
- Ali-Hulk (de pie) – Rodellar (ESP) – June 27, 2007
- Esclatamasters – Perles (ESP) – March 8, 2007 – Second ascent. First ascent by Ramón Julián Puigblanqué
- A Muerte – Siurana (ESP) – December 7, 2006 – Third ascent
- Bain de Sang – Saint-Loup (SUI) – April 13, 2005
- Psychedelic – Gorilla Cliffs (USA) – November 18, 2001 – First ascent
- Action directe – Frankenjura (GER) – May 21, 2001 – fourth ascent

=== Boulder problems ===
As of June 2022, Graham had climbed about 700 boulder problems between 8A (V11) and 8C+ (V16), of which 4 were onsighted and 29 flashed:

- 3 8C+
- 17 8C
- 69 8B+
- 163 8B
- 213 8A+ (of which 1 flashed and 2 onsighted)
- 246 8A (of which 28 flashed and 2 onsighted)

8C+ (V16)

- Hypnotised Minds - Rocky Mountain National Park – October, 2019 – Third ascent. First ascent by Daniel Woods, 2010
- Euclase - Val Bavona, Switzerland – April, 2022 – First Ascent. Awaiting grade confirmation.
- F*ck the System - Fionnay, Switzerland – June, 2022 – First ascent by Shawn Raboutou, 2021
- Celestite - Val Bavona, Switzerland – June, 2023 - First Ascent. Awaiting grade confirmation.
- Curve Ball - Val Bavona, Switzerland - March, 2025 - Second ascent. First ascent by Giuliano Cameroni.

8C (V15):

- La Rustica – Val Bavona, Switzerland – April, 2022 – First Ascent Jimmy Webb 2019
- 4-low – Val Bavona, Switzerland – February, 2022 – First Ascent Daniel Woods
- Primitivo – Val Bavona, Switzerland – February, 2022 – 3rd ascent, First Ascent Jimmy Webb 2019
- Roadkill – Val Bavona, Switzerland – December, 2021 – First Ascent Shawn Raboutou
- Trieste Assis – Red Rock, USA – April 2020
- Squoze – Red Rock, USA – December 2019 – First Ascent Jimmy Webb
- Meadowlark Lemon – Gateway Canyon (USA) – January 8, 2013 – Second ascent. First ascent by Paul Robinson in 2012
- The Wheel of Life – Hollow Mountain Cave (AUS) – June 8, 2012 – Sixth ascent. First ascent by Dai Koyamada in 2004. Composed of 65 moves, it links four different boulder problems. Although it is climbed without rope, it is considered to be almost a climbing route. It is commonly graded 8C as a boulder problem, and 9a as a route. Graham stated that it was "not possible to compare it to other boulder problems, due to its length", and that it was in a league above 9a routes he had climbed, possibly even a 9a+.
- Paint it Black – Rocky Mountain National Park (USA) – April 18, 2012 – Third ascent. First ascent by Daniel Woods in 2012
- The Ice Knife – Guanella Pass (USA) – October 18, 2011 – First ascent
- Warrior Up – Mt Evans / Wolverine Land (USA) – September 4, 2010 – Second ascent. First ascent by Daniel Woods
- Big Paw – Chironico (SUI) – November 27, 2008 – First ascent
- The Island – Fontainebleau (FRA)- April 7, 2008 – First ascent
- From Dirt Grows The Flowers – Chironico (SUI) – March 7, 2005 – First ascent
- The Story of Two Worlds – Cresciano (SUI) – January 9, 2005 – First ascent
- Foundation's Edge - Fionnay (SUI) – October 15, 2013 – First Ascent

== See also ==
- Notable first free ascents
