= Daniel Woods =

American rock climber

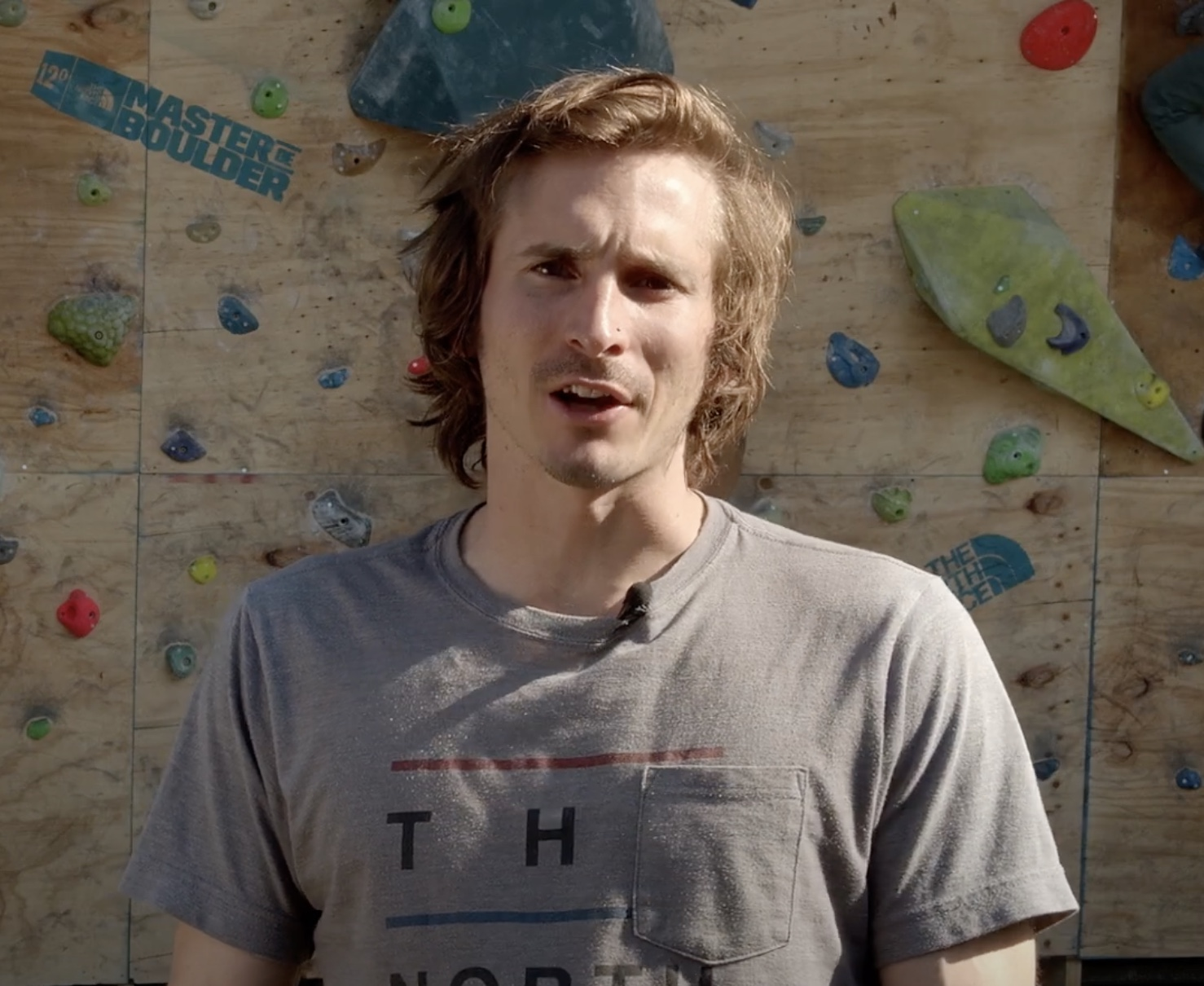
- Woods in 2019

Personal information
- Born: August 1, 1989 (age 36) Richardson, Texas, U.S.
- Occupation: Professional rock climber
- Height: 1.70 m (5 ft 7 in)
- Weight: 61 kg (134 lb)

Climbing career
- Type of climber: Bouldering; Sport climbing; Competition bouldering
- Highest grade: Bouldering: 9A, V17
- First ascents: Return of the Sleepwalker (V17, 2021); The Process (V16, 2015)
- Known for: Second-ever climber to send 9A (V17)
Medal record
Men's competition climbing
Representing United States
World Cup
Gold medal – first place	2010 Vail	Bouldering
Silver medal – second place	2009 Vail	Bouldering
Silver medal – second place	2011 Eindhoven	Bouldering
Bronze medal – third place	2008 Hall	Bouldering
- Updated on August 3, 2022

Daniel Woods (born August 1, 1989) is an American professional rock climber who specializes in bouldering, and who is considered one of the most important climbers in the history of bouldering. Woods has climbed over thirty boulder problems graded at or above 8C (V15). He has also won several competition bouldering events, such as the U.S. National Bouldering Championship and some international events. In March 2021, Woods achieved the first ascent of a low start to Sleepwalker V16 (8C+) which he named Return of the Sleepwalker and proposed the grade 9A (V17), only the second-ever route in history at that grade.

== Early life ==
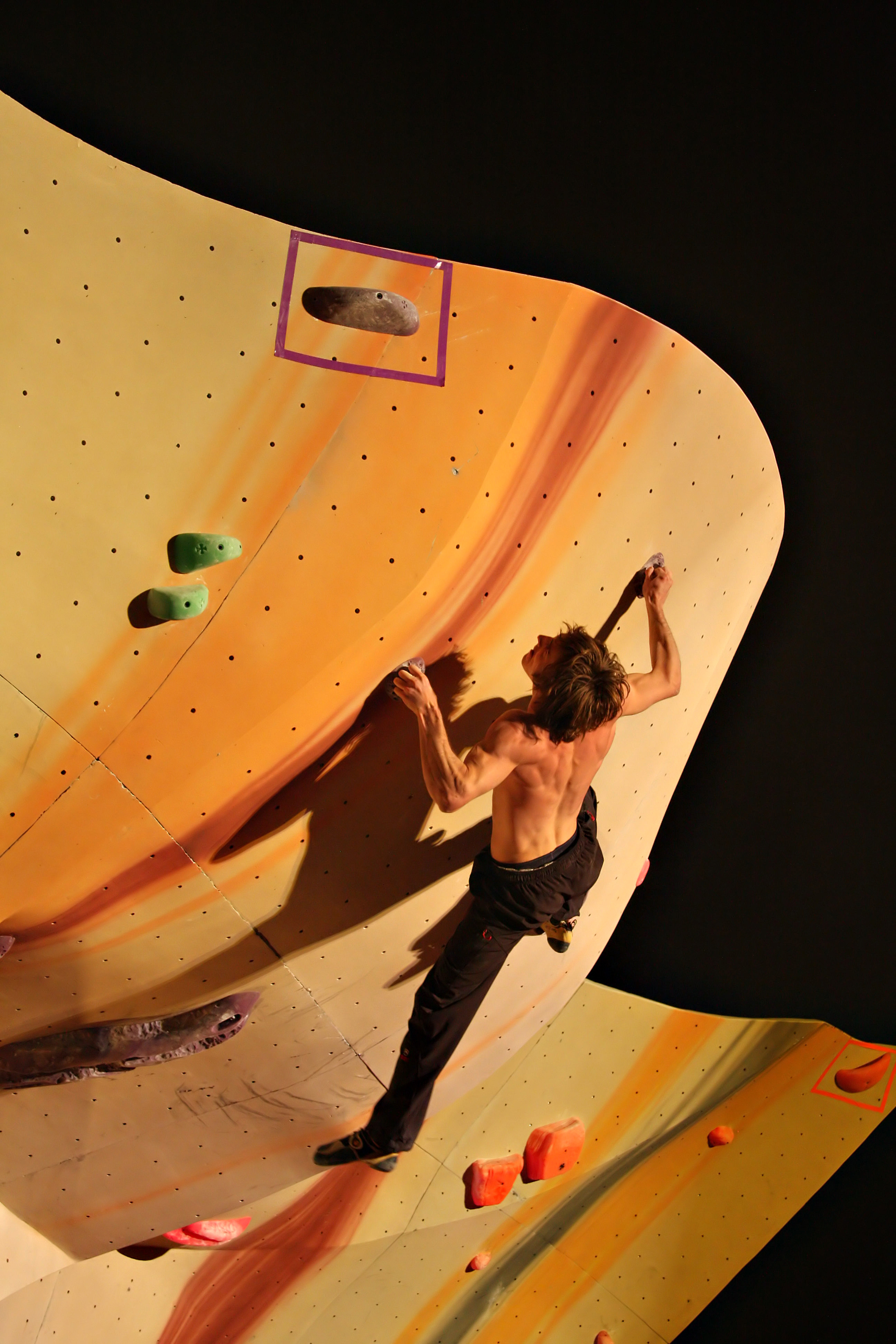
Woods competing in Boulder, Colorado in 2010

Woods was born in Richardson, Texas, and was introduced to climbing through the cub scouts. In 1997, when he was 8 years old, his family moved to Longmont, Colorado. Woods then began competing and was part of a junior climbing team coached by Justin Sjong and Jimmie Redo.

== Climbing career ==
=== Rock climbing ===
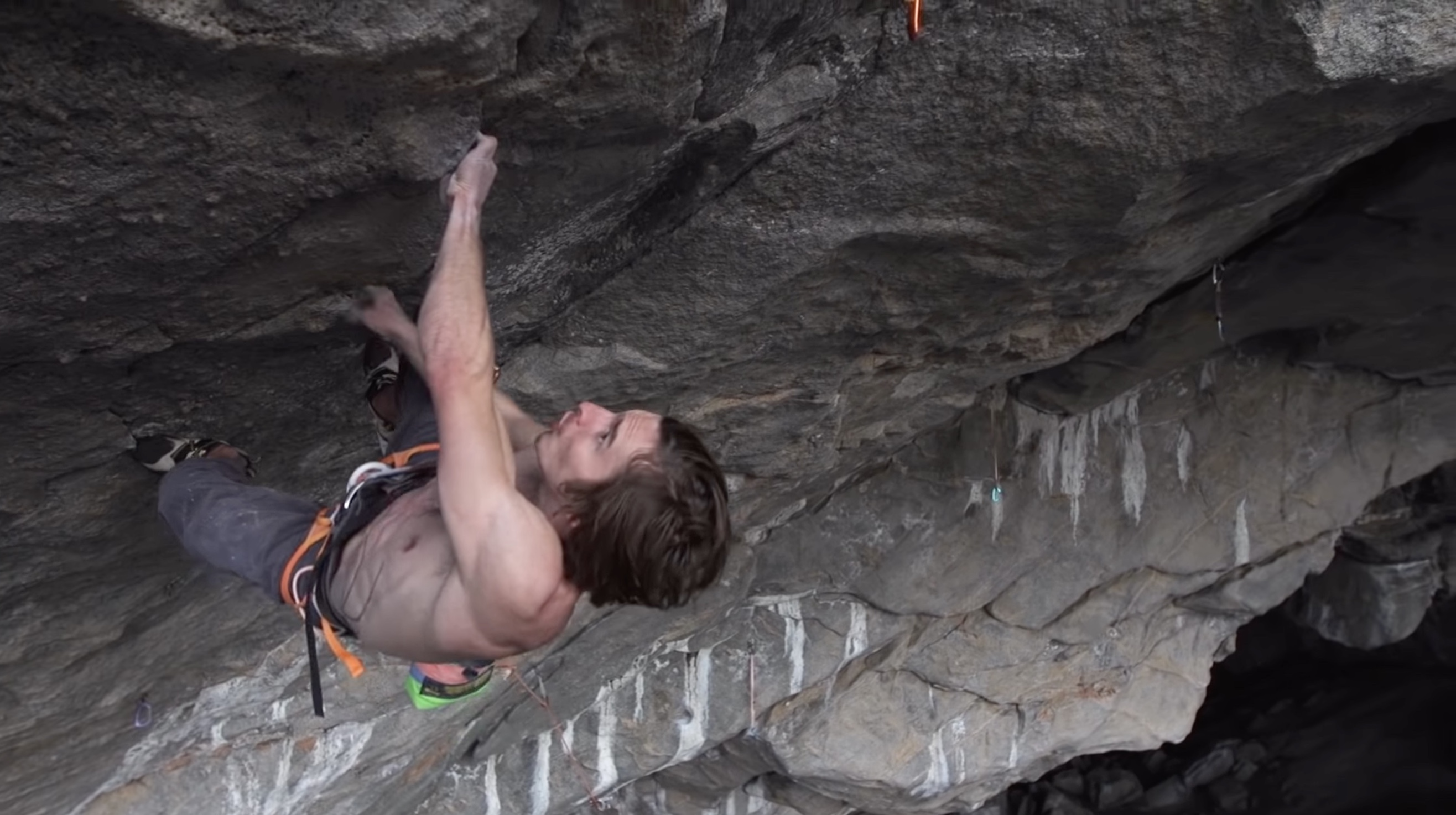
Woods climbing Thor's Hammer (9a+ 5.15a) in the Hanshelleren Caves, Flatanger Municipality, Norway in 2019

In 2003, Woods climbed his first bouldering problem rated 8A (V11), Fuck You Finger. The following year, at the age of 15, he made the first ascent of Echale, grading it 8B+ (V14).

On June 19, 2007, while traveling in the Chaos Canyon area of Rocky Mountain National Park, Woods made the first ascent of Jade, formerly named The Green 45 Project, a project he had worked for several years with Dave Graham. He graded it 8C (V15), making it his hardest ascent at that point. The consensus for the rating of Jade is now 8B+ (V14).

In early 2008, at the age of 18, Woods moved to Innsbruck, Austria, and spent part of his time training with Kilian Fischhuber and David Lama. In May 2008, he made the first ascent of In Search of Time Lost at Magic Wood in Switzerland and graded it 8C (V15).

In November 2011, Woods began filming a climbing movie called Welcome to the Hood with Paul Robinson, Guntram Jörg, and Anthony Gullsten. The filming lasted five months, during which the group climbed at some of the most famous and difficult bouldering sites in the world. The first part of the film was set in Magic Wood, Switzerland, where Woods climbed Somewhere in Between 8B+ (V14).

=== Competition climbing ===
Despite primarily focusing on hard outdoor bouldering, Daniel Woods is one of the most accomplished American male competition climbers. He won the ABS National Championship 9 times, the SCS National Championship, and competed in many IFSC World Cup events, earning a gold medal in the Vail World Cup in 2010. Woods also has the most open wins at the Hueco Tanks Rock Rodeo, his most recent having been in 2017.

Woods won the American Bouldering Series national championship in 2005, 2006, 2007, 2009, 2010, 2012 and 2013 and the Teva Mountain Games in the bouldering category in 2006, 2007 and, 2010.

== Notable ascents ==
=== Boulder problems ===
9A (V17):

- Return of the Sleepwalker - Black Velvet Canyon (Red Rocks, USA) - 30 March 2021 - First Ascent

8C+ (V16):

- Grand Illusion - Little Cottonwood Canyon (Utah) - June 2021 - Third ascent.
- Off the Wagon Low - Val Bavona (Switzerland) - March 2020 - Third ascent.
- Sleepwalker - Black Velvet Canyon (Red Rocks, USA) - 16 January 2019 - Second ascent
- Box Therapy - Rocky Mountain National Park (USA) - 31 October 2018 - First ascent
- Creature from the Black Lagoon - Rocky Mountain National Park (USA) - 27 September 2016 - First ascent
- The Process - Bishop (USA) - 17 January 2015 - First ascent
- Hypnotized Minds - Rocky Mountain National Park (USA) - 21 October 2010 - First ascent
- Insomniac - Lincoln Lake (USA) - 15 September 2022 - Second ascent
- Adrenaline - Colorado (USA) - February 2024 - First Ascent

8C (V15):

- Direct Hit - Ubatuba (BRA) - 13 December 2019 - First Ascent
- Finnish Line - Rocklands (South Africa) - 30 June 2018 - Fifth Ascent
- Topaz - Wild Basin (USA) - 12 October 2016 - Second ascent
- Spray of Light - Rocklands (South Africa) - July 2015 - First ascent
- Noise Vs Beauty - Rocklands (South Africa) - 14 June 2015 - First ascent, V14/V15
- Lucid Dreaming - Bishop (USA) - 28 January 2014 - Second ascent of Paul Robinson's boulder (2010), downgraded from 8C+(V16)
- El Diablo - Peñoles (MEX) - 19 January 2014 - First ascent
- The Nest - Red Rock (USA) - 18 December 2013 - First ascent
- Defying Gravity - South Platte (USA) - 16 November 2013 - First ascent
- The Ice Knife SDS - Guanella Pass (USA) - 2 November 2013 - First ascent
- Delirium - Mt. Blue Sky (USA) - 18 September 2013 - Second ascent
- The Wheel of Wolvo - Mt. Blue Sky (USA) - 9 September 2013 - Second ascent
- The Wheel of Life - Grampians (AUS) - 23 July 2013 - 9th ascent of Dai Koyamada's boulder (2004), downgraded from 8C+(V16)
- Hydrangea - Shiobara (JPN) - 14 February 2013 - Second ascent of Dai Koyamada's boulder (2005), downgraded from 8C+(V16)
- Witness The Fitness - Ozark Mountains (USA) - 5 January 2013 - Third ascent
- White Noise - Wild Basin (USA) - 18 September 2012 - First ascent
- Monkey Wedding - Rocklands (South Africa) - 13 August 2012 - Fourth ascent
- Paint it Black - Rocky Mountain National Park (USA) - 29 February 2012 - First ascent
- Big Paw - Chironico (SUI) - 24 November 2011 - Second ascent
- La Force Tranquille - Magic Wood (SUI) - 15 October 2011 - First ascent
- Ill Trill - Magic Wood (SUI) - 19 April 2011 - Third ascent
- Practice of the Wild - Magic Wood (SUI) - 16 April 2011 - Third ascent
- Warrior Up - Mt. Blue Sky (USA) - 4 September 2010 - Second ascent
- Desperanza - Hueco Tanks (USA) - 27 February 2010 - First ascent
- The Game - Boulder Canyon (USA) - 10 February 2010 - First ascent
- Terremer - Hueco Tanks (USA) - 30 January 2010 - Third ascent
- In Search of Time Lost - Magic Wood (SUI) - 9 September 2008 - First ascent

=== Redpointed sport routes ===
9a+ (5.15a):

- Thor's Hammer in the Hanshelleren Caves, Flatanger Municipality, Norway in 2019. Repeat

== See also ==
- List of grade milestones in rock climbing
