= Rock climbing =

Type of activity and sport

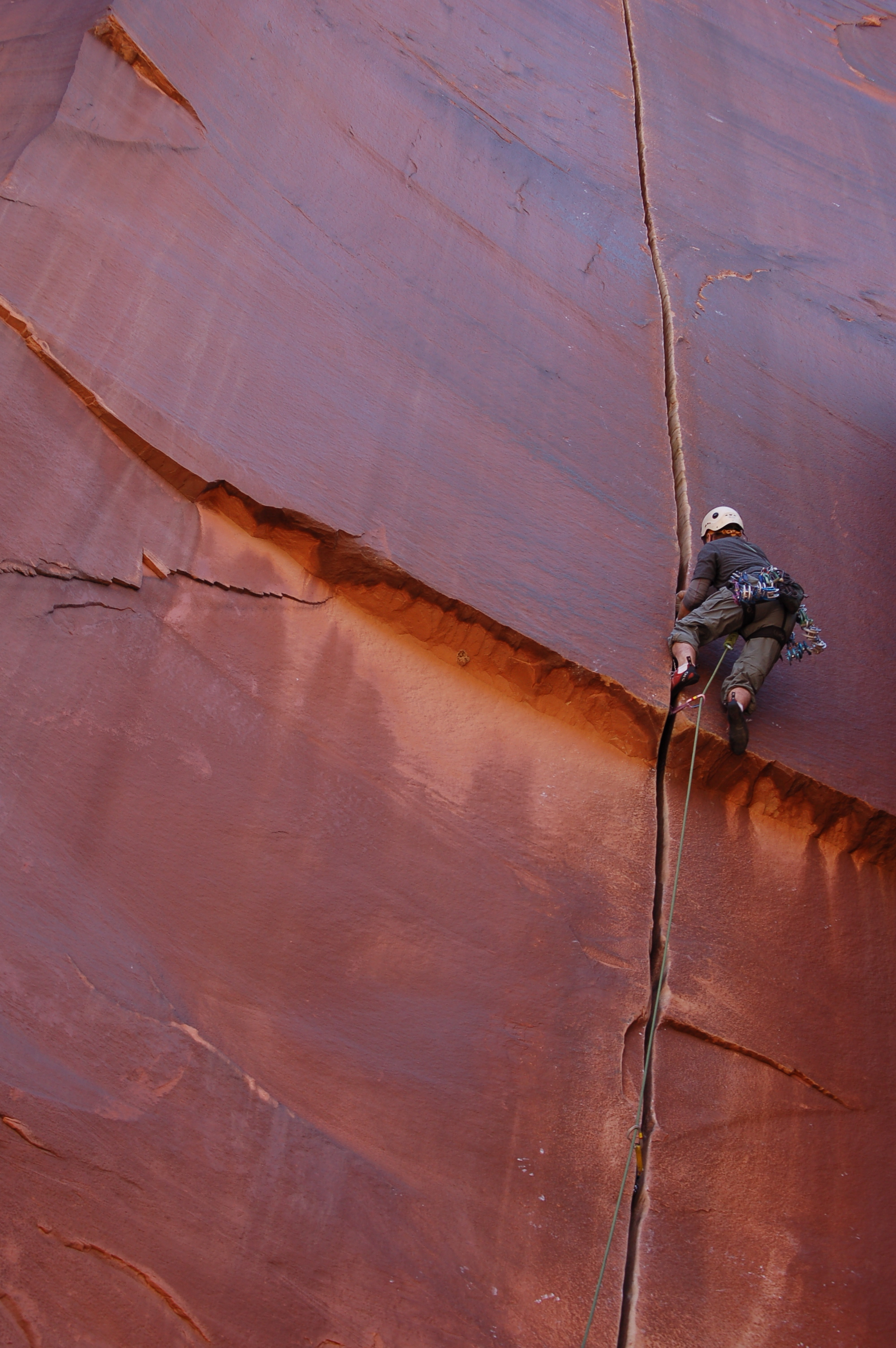
A traditional climber lead-climbing a crack-climb in Indian Creek, Utah.

Rock climbing is a climbing sports discipline that involves ascending routes consisting of natural rock in an outdoor environment, or on artificial climbing walls in a mostly indoor environment. Routes are documented in guidebooks, and on online databases, detailing how to climb the route (called the beta), and who made the first ascent (or FA) and the coveted first free ascent (or FFA). Climbers will try to ascend a route onsight, however, a climber can spend years projecting a route before they make a redpoint ascent.

Routes range from a few metres to over 1,000 metres (3,300 ft) in height, and traverses can reach 4,500 metres (14,800 ft) in length. They include slabs, faces, cracks and overhangs/roofs. Popular rock types are granite (e.g. El Capitan), limestone (e.g. Verdon Gorge), and sandstone (e.g. Saxon Switzerland) but 43 types of climbable rock types have been identified. Artificial indoor climbing walls are popular and competition climbing — which takes place on artificial walls — became an Olympic sport in 2020.

Contemporary rock climbing is focused on free climbing where — unlike with aid climbing — no mechanical aids can be used to assist with upward momentum. Free-climbing encompasses bouldering on short 5-metre (16 ft) routes, single-pitch climbing on up to 60–70-metre (200–230 ft) routes, multi-pitch climbing — and big wall climbing — on routes of up to 1,000 metres (3,300 ft). Free-climbing can be done as free solo climbing with no protection whatsoever, or as lead climbing with either removable temporary protection (called traditional climbing), or permanently fixed bolted protection (called sport climbing).

The evolution in technical milestones in rock climbing is tied to the development in rock-climbing equipment (e.g. rubber shoes, spring-loaded camming devices, and campus boards) and rock-climbing technique (e.g. jamming, crimping, and smearing). The most dominant grading systems worldwide are the "French numerical" and "American YDS" systems for lead climbing, and the V-grade and the Font-grade for bouldering. As of September 2026, the hardest technical lead climbing grade is 9c (5.15d) for men and 9b+ (5.15c) for women, and the hardest technical bouldering grade is V17 (9A) for men and V16 (8C+) for women.

The main types of rock climbing can trace their origins to late 19th-century Europe, with bouldering in Fontainebleau, big wall climbing in the Dolomites, and single-pitch climbing in both the Lake District and in Saxony. Climbing ethics initially focused on "fair means" and the transition from aid climbing to free climbing and latterly to clean climbing; the use of bolted protection on outdoor routes is a source of ongoing debate in climbing. The sport's profile was increased when lead climbing, bouldering, and speed climbing became medal events in the Summer Olympics, and with the popularity of films such as Free Solo and The Dawn Wall.

== Description ==
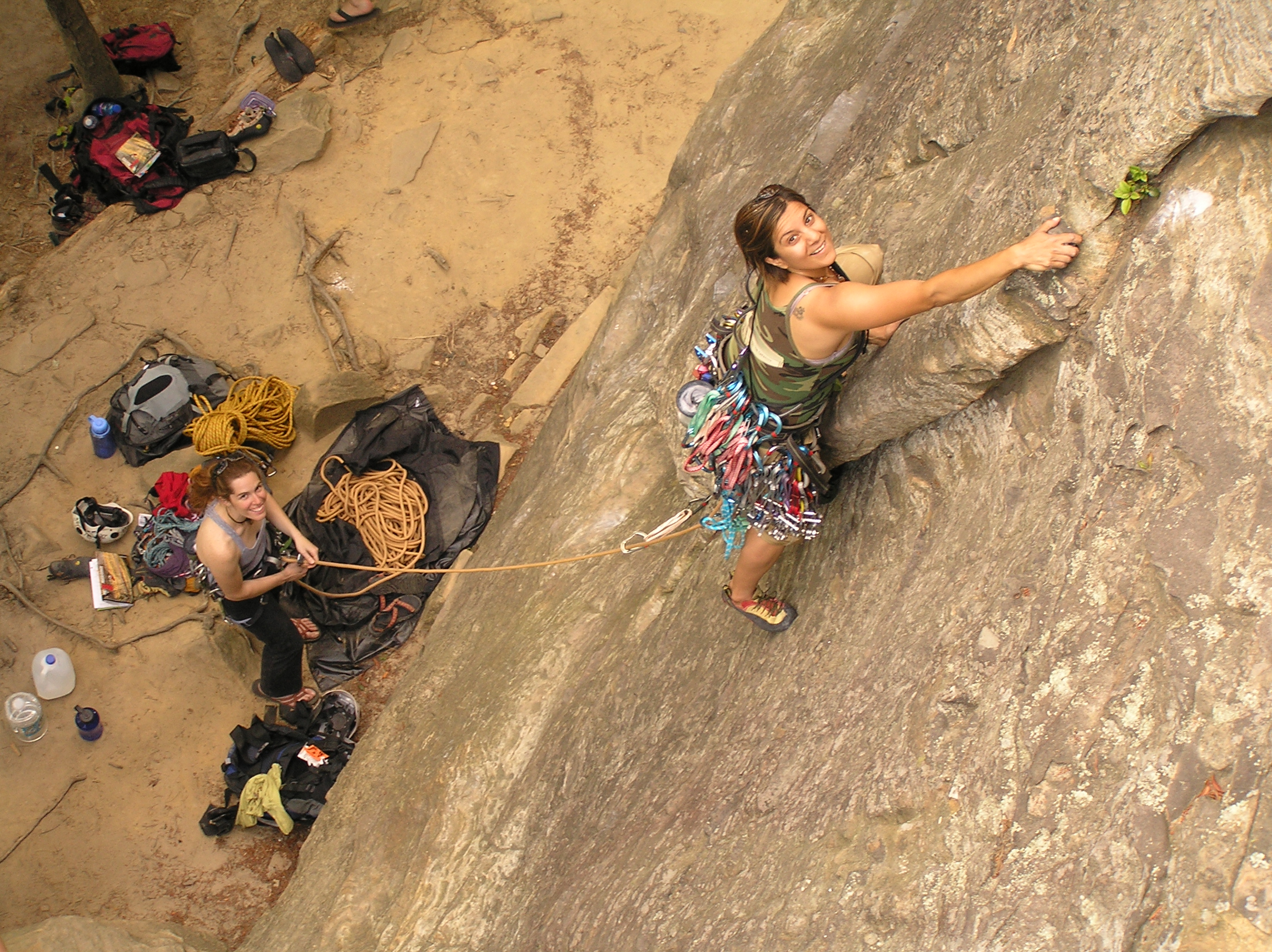
A 'lead climbing pair' with the 'leader' carrying a 'rack' of removable traditional climbing protection gear, and their 'belayer' standing on the ground below

A key concept in many types of rock climbing is that of the 'lead climbing pair'. One member — the 'lead climber' — will try to climb the route and overcome its challenges with a rope attached to their harness. The other member — the 'belayer' (or 'second') — will remain standing at the base of the route but controlling the other end of the rope, which is called belaying. The 'belayer' uses a mechanical belay device to attach the rope to their harness from which they can 'pay-out' the rope as the 'lead climber' ascends but with which they can lock the rope if the 'lead climber' falls. Once the 'lead climber' reaches the top, they create an anchor from which they can act as the 'belayer' (but from above), controlling the rope while the 'second' ascends.

Types of climbing protection devices

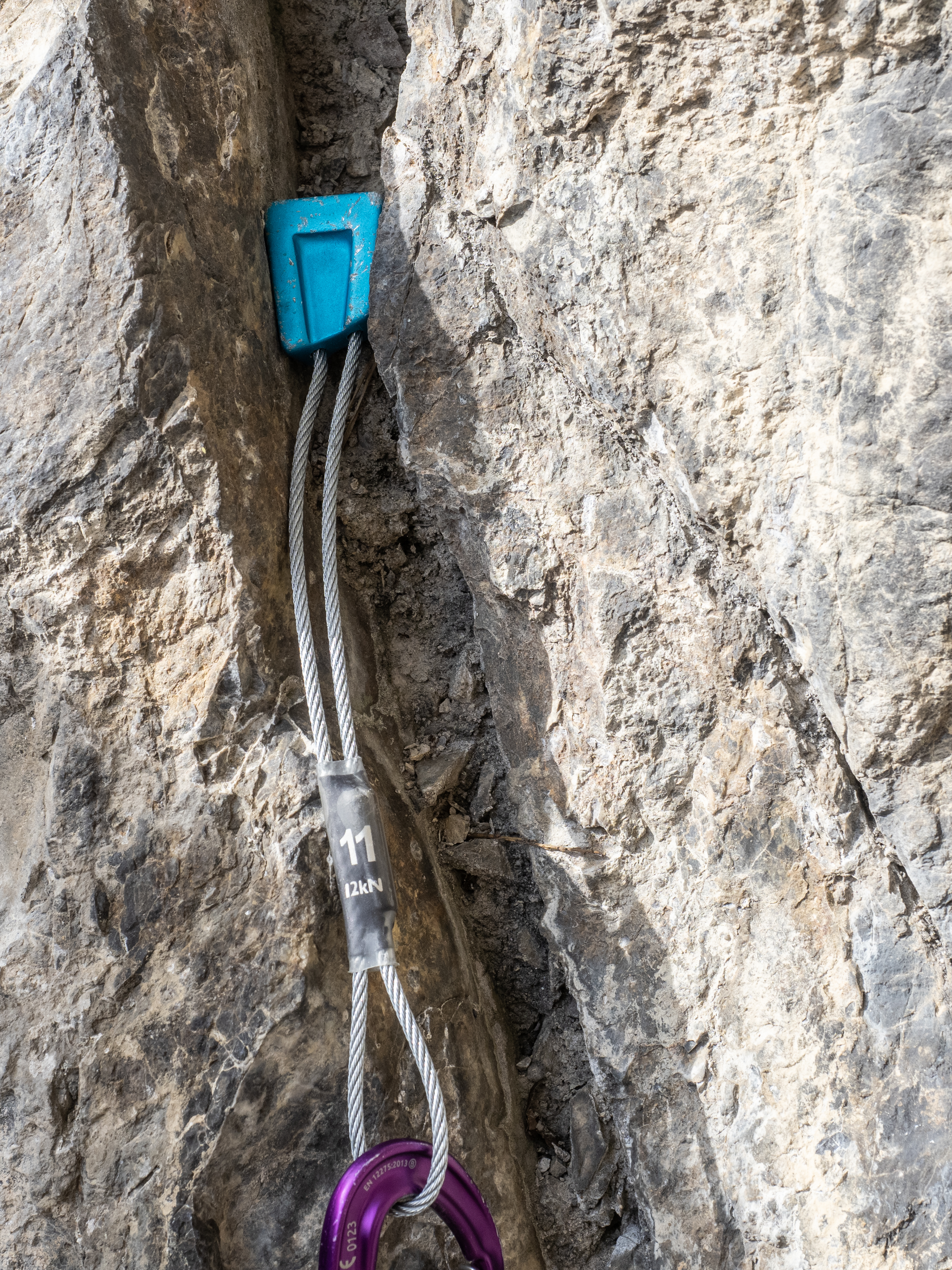
Removable nut

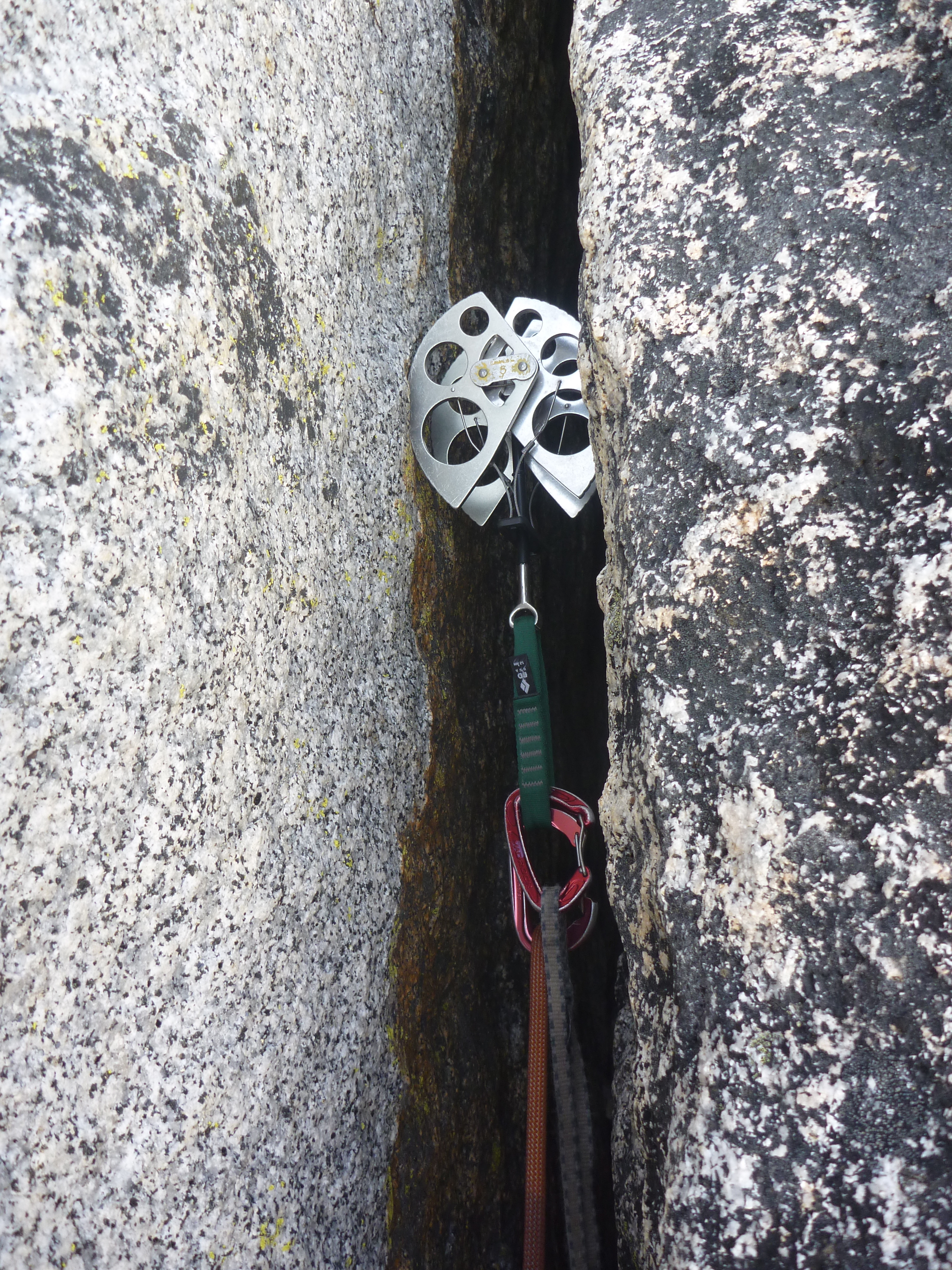
Removable SLCD

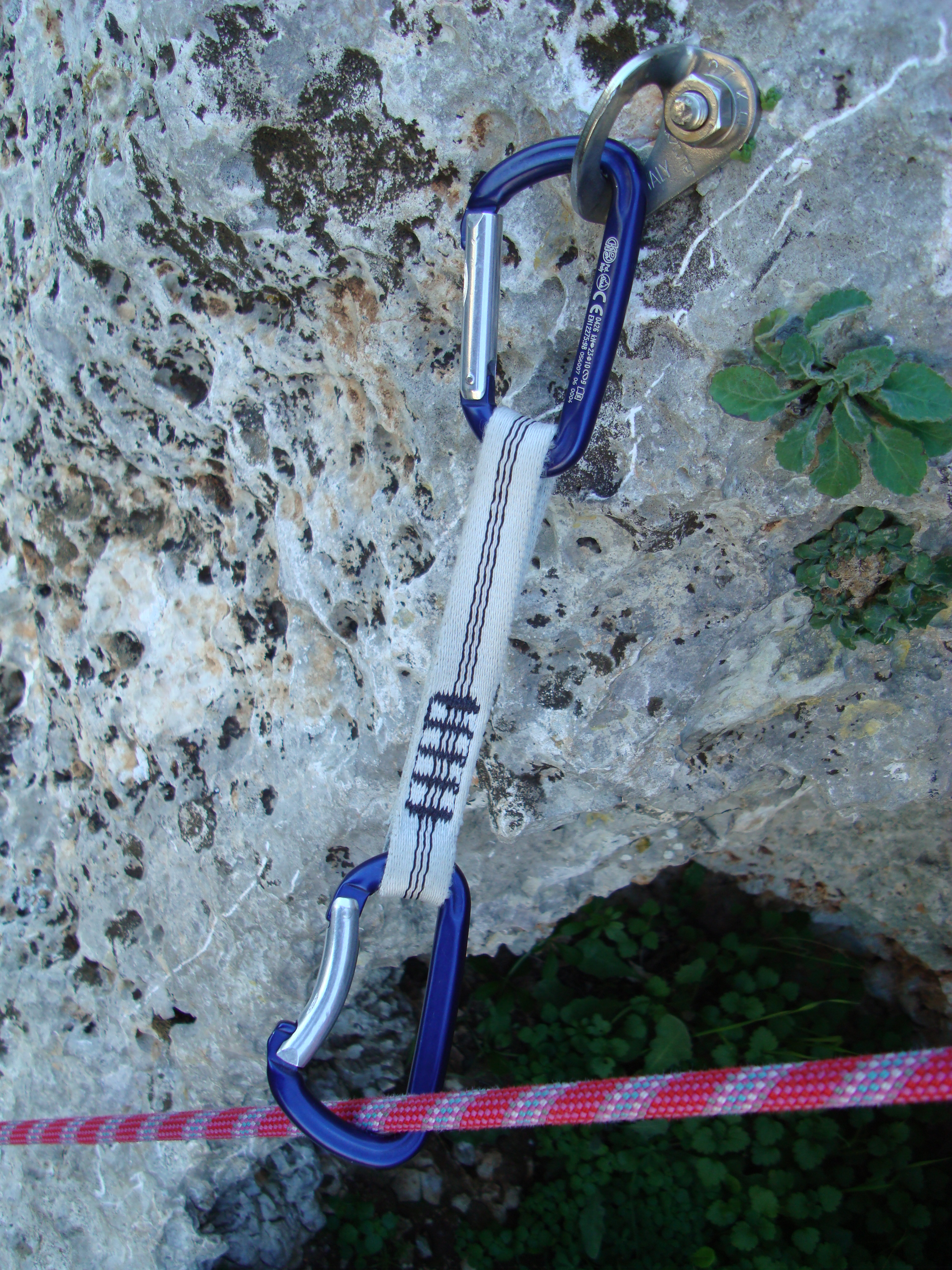
Fixed bolt

Another key concept is that of climbing protection (or 'gear' or 'rack'). Early 20th-century rock climbers relied on the 'lead climber' looping the rope around natural spikes of rock as they ascended. If they fell, and the 'belayer' held the rope fast — which they would have to do manually by looping the rope around their waist — the 'lead climber' would hang from the rope if it had stayed looped around a spike of rock — if it didn't, they fell to the ground. Modern rock climbers use mechanical protection devices placed along the route, into which the 'lead climber' clips the rope as they ascend; if they fall, the 'belayer' will lock the rope, and the 'lead climber' will fall until they hang from the last 'protection device' that they had clipped the rope into. This protection can be removable (which is known as traditional climbing), or permanently fixed into the rock (which is known as sport climbing).

If the lead climber falls, the belayer will immediately lock the rope using their belay device, and the 'lead climber' will fall twice the distance that they are above their last piece of climbing protection. If this piece of climbing protection fails — a major risk of traditional climbing — and rips away from the rock, they will keep falling until their next piece of protection holds the rope (a zipper fall is where several pieces fail). On some routes, the opportunities for placing protection are poor so that the 'lead climber' is forced to leave large gaps between protection points — called a runout — so that any fall will be large (called a whipper). The wide variety of types of rock climbing offers safe ways for beginners to access the sport before learning to lead climb, including top roping and bouldering, and many will try leading on sport-routes first before attempting traditional-routes.

Finally, while rock climbing mostly involves ascending a route, climbers sometimes need to be able to descend a route — either in retreat (e.g. self-rescue climbing) or because they have completed it and there is no other way down. This requires the technique of abseiling (or rappelling in North America), where climbers use abseil devices to move down a fixed rope that has been anchored to a point at the top of the route.

== Types of routes ==
=== Natural outdoor ===
Examples of rock climbing routes

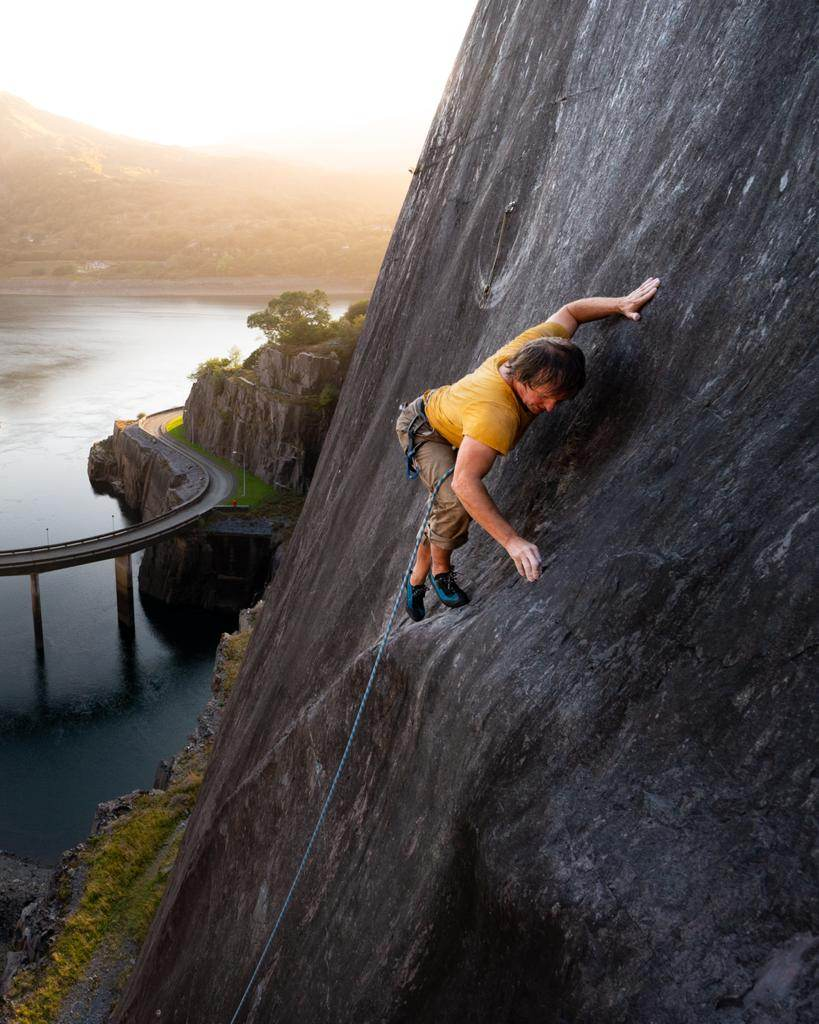
Slate smooth slabs with no hand-holds, Johnny Dawes on Poetry Pink (E5 6b)

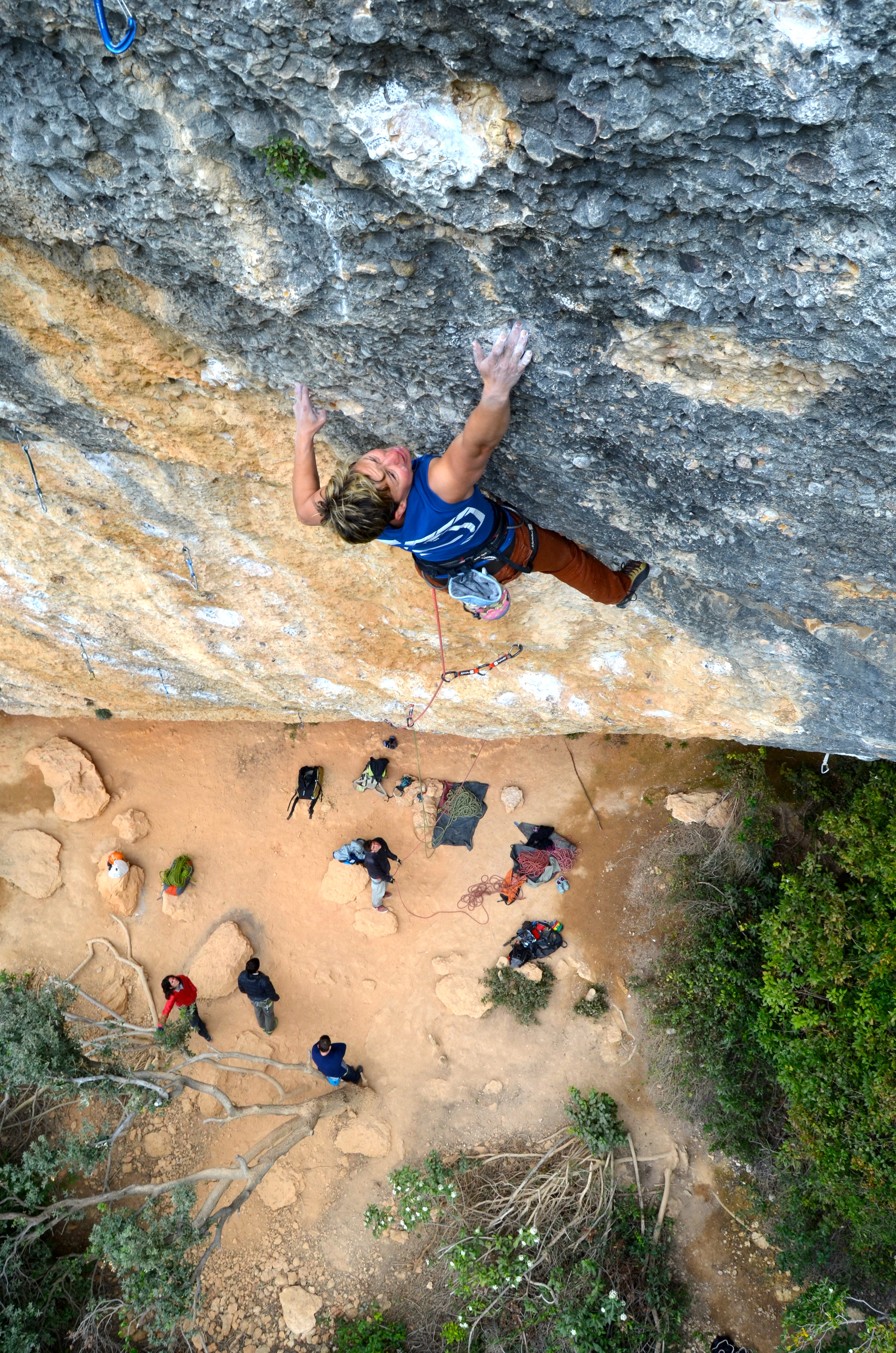
Limestone overhangs with one-finger pockets, Muriel Sarkany on Era Vella (9a)

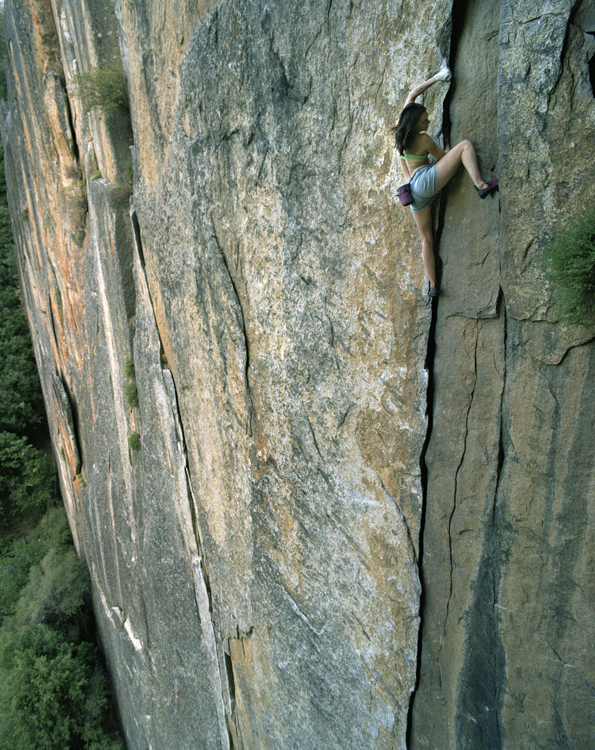
Granite cracks, Steph Davis on Outer Limits (5.11a).

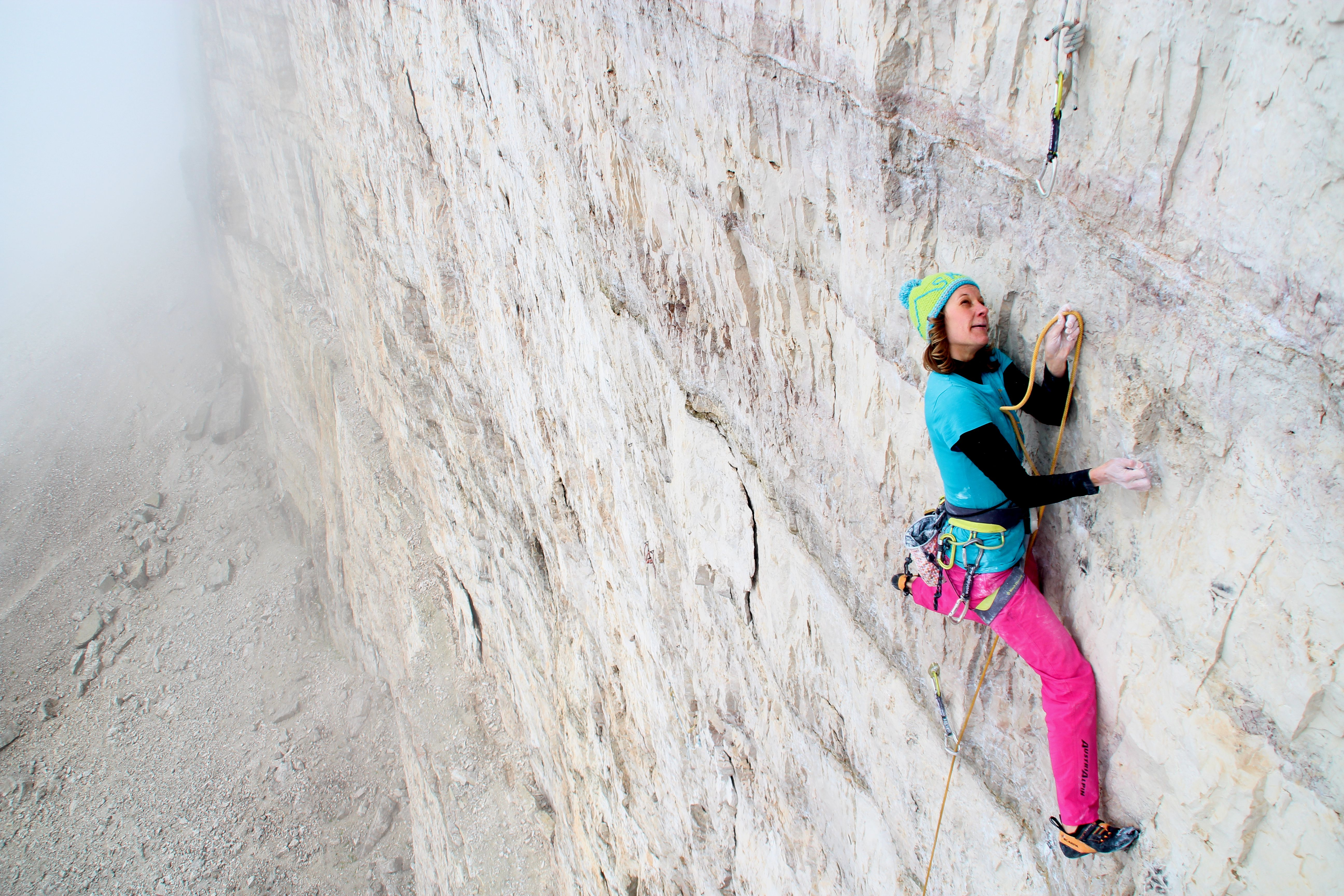
Sedimentary rock 'big-wall' faces, Lisi Steurer on the north face of the Cima Grande (8a)

Climbing routes can range from just a few metres in height to over 1,000 metres (3,300 ft). The higher the route, the greater the danger and the greater range of techniques and equipment needed, however, the technical difficulty of a route is not correlated to its height. Climbers have spent as many years trying to ascend 4-metre (13 ft) routes such as Burden of Dreams, as they have on 1,000-metre (3,300 ft) routes like The Nose. Rock climbing routes at high-altitude, such as on big wall routes like Eternal Flame on the Trango Towers, present additional physical challenges. Traversing routes, by their horizontal nature, can extend to great distances, and the world's longest rock climb is the 4,500-metre (14,800 ft) El Capitan Girdle Traverse on El Capitan.

Famous routes have been created on almost every climbable rock type, and particularly so on granite, which is noted for its grip and large cracks (e.g. El Capitan, Joshua Tree or Squamish), on limestone, which is known for its detailed holds and cracks (e.g. Malham Cove, Céüse, and the Verdon Gorge), and on sandstone, which can have sculpted features (e.g. Indian Creek, Saxon Switzerland, Rocklands, and Fontainebleau). However, climbing areas have been identified on over 43 climbable rock types including on gritstone (e.g. Stanage Edge), on slate (e.g. Dinorwic quarry), on dolorite (e.g. Fair Head), on iron rock (e.g. Hueco Tanks), on gneiss (e.g. Magic Wood), on dolomite (e.g. Tri Cime), on monzonite (e.g., The Buttermilks), and on quartzite (e.g. Mount Arapiles).

Climbers also differentiate routes by challenges encountered and the techniques required to overcome them. Some of the earliest rock climbs were smooth off-vertical 'slab climbs' where balance and shoe grip (or 'smearing') were key; famous modern examples include Indian Face in the UK. Climbers then acquired the techniques to ascend near-vertical 'crack climbs' by 'laybacking', 'bridging', and 'jamming'; famous examples include Super Crack, The Phoenix and Grand Illusion (all in the US). Climbers then took on blank vertical 'face climbs' by 'crimping' and 'edging' on tiny holds, which required bolts drilled into the rock for their climbing protection; famous face routes include The Face and Wallstreet (Germany), La Rage de Vivre and Super Plafond (France), and To Bolt or Not to Be and Just Do It (the US). Eventually, they migrated to routes that were also severely and continually overhanging and which required 'dynos' (or jumps) to reach holds; famous examples include Action Directe (Germany), Realization (also called Biographie) (France), La Rambla (Spain), Jumbo Love (the US), La Dura Dura (Spain) and Silence (Norway).

=== Artificial indoor ===
Indoor climbing environments

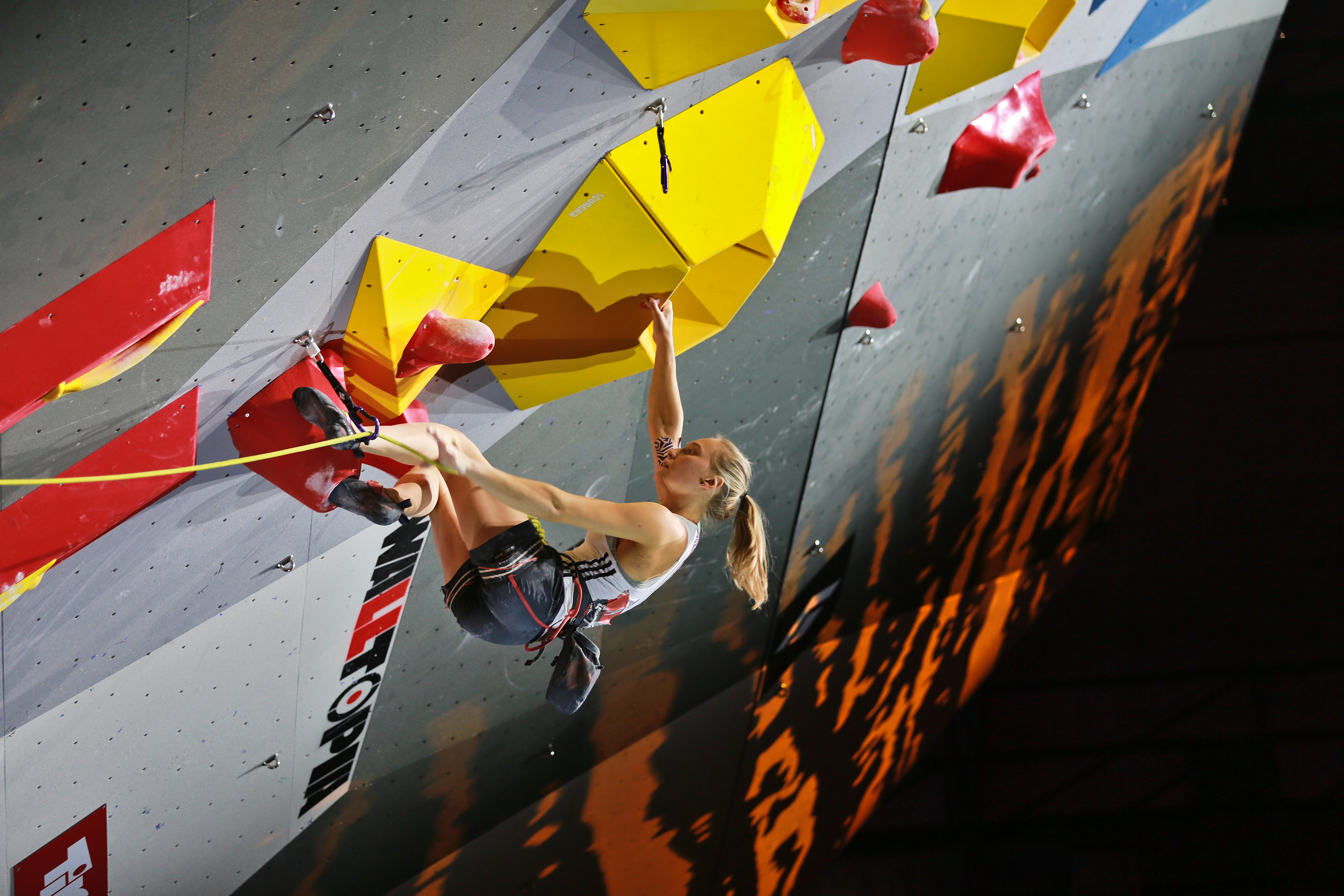
World Championships walls

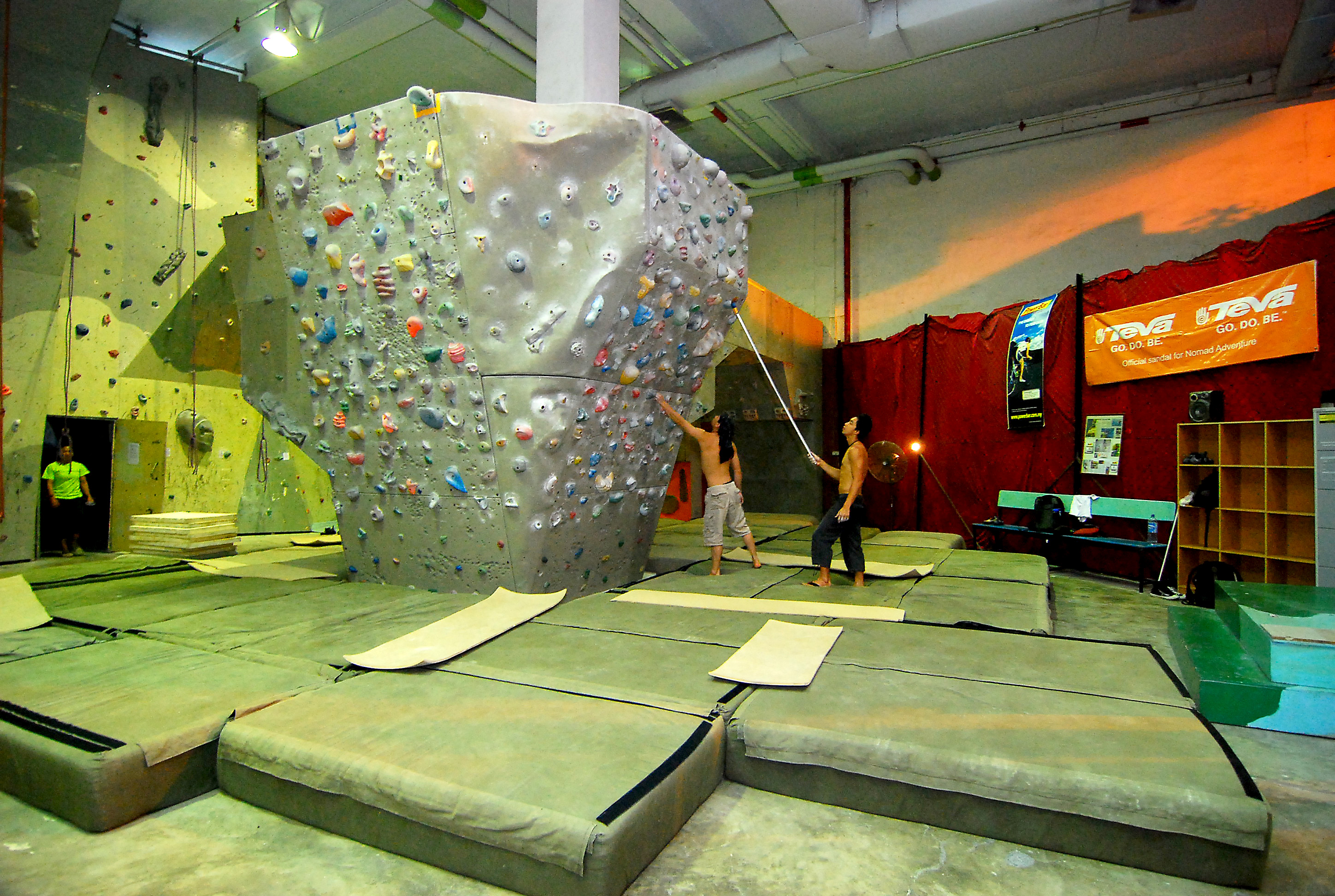
Artificial bouldering walls

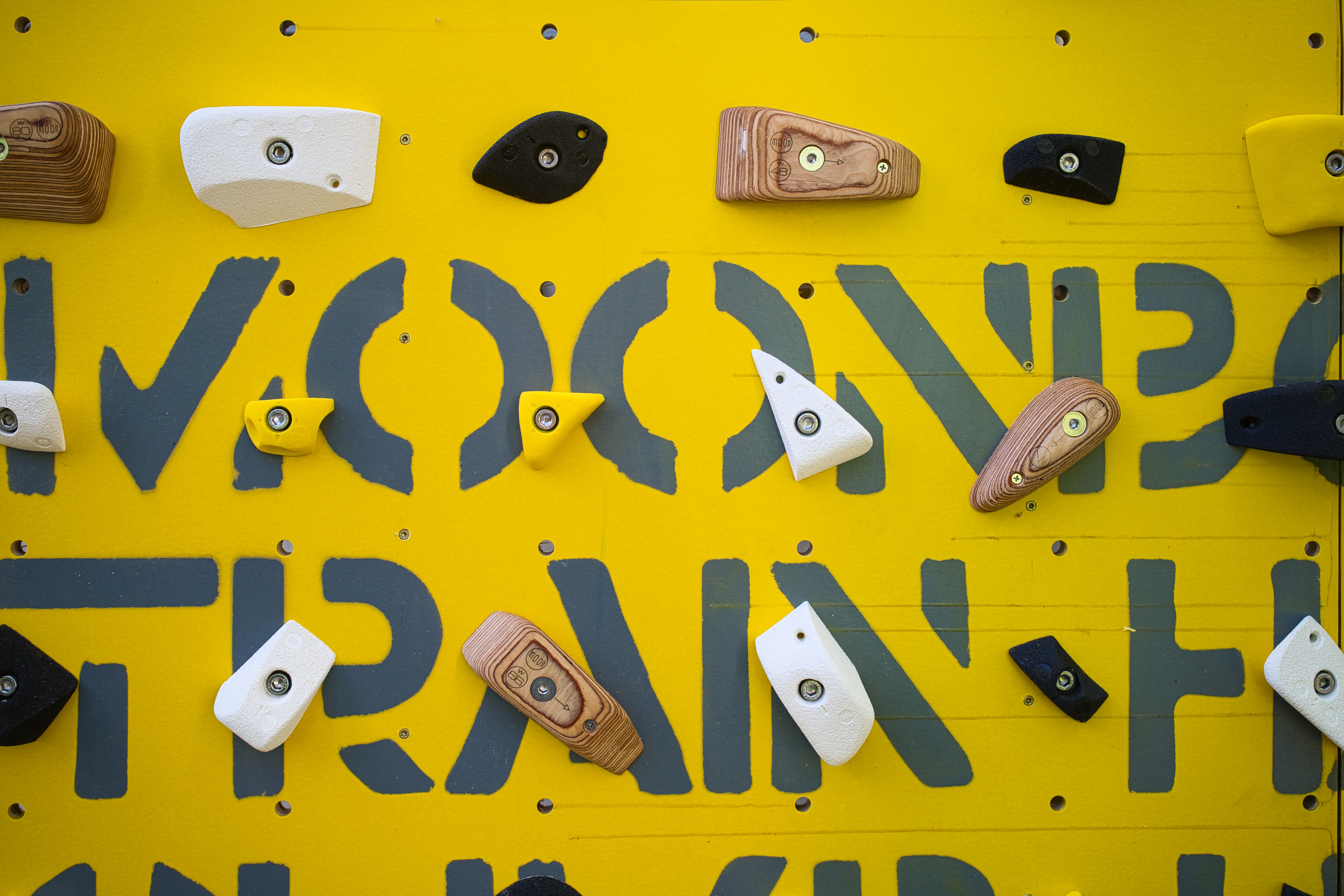
MoonBoard training walls

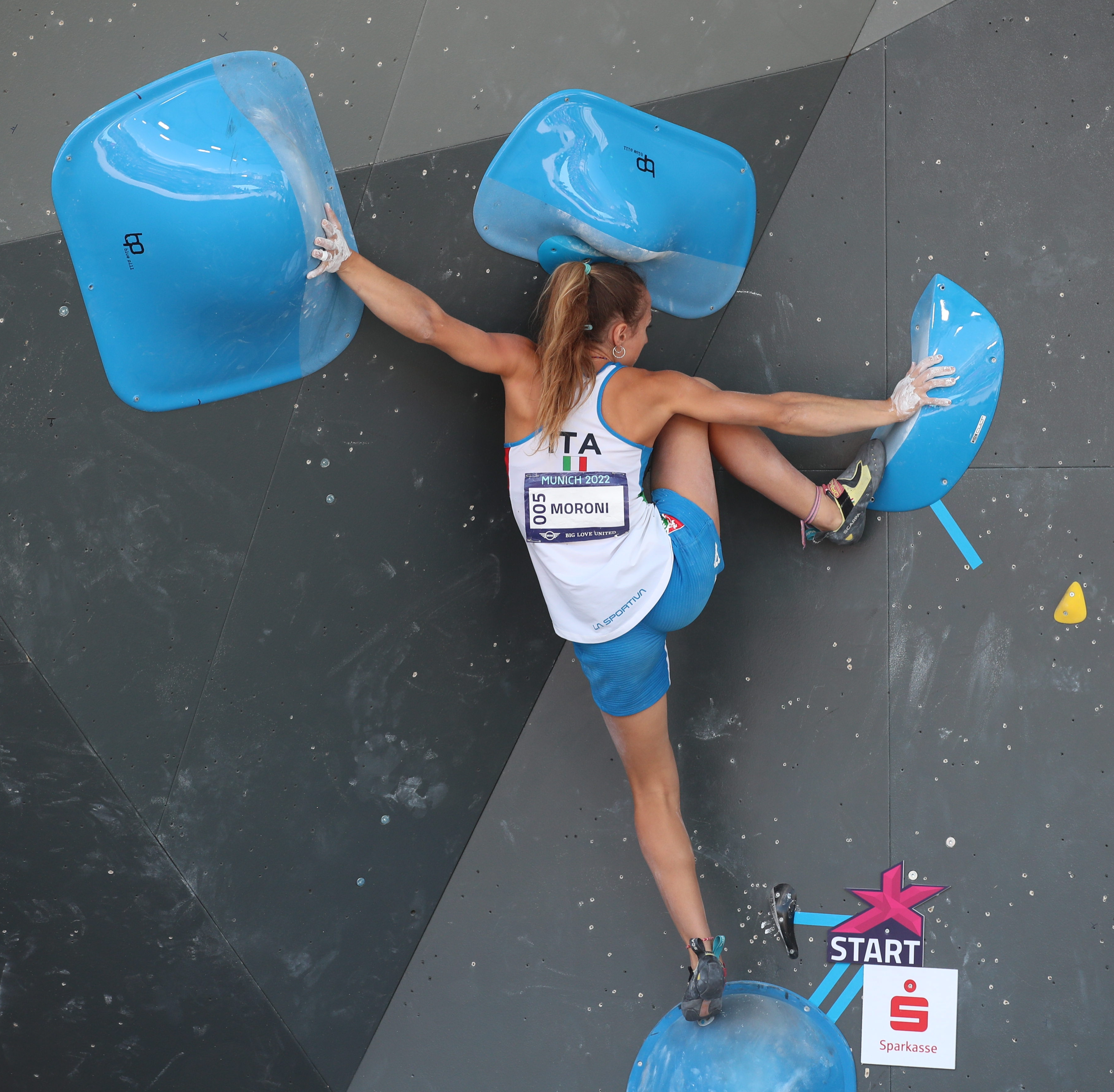
Artificial volume holds

In 1964, a new artificial indoor climbing wall built in a corridor of Leeds University began to produce climbers who, after exclusively training as students on the wall, could climb some of the hardest routes in Britain when they ventured into the outdoor environment. This led to an explosion in indoor climbing that was further amplified by the rise of bolted sport climbing and of bouldering, which are also suited to indoor climbing.

Modern indoor climbing walls and gyms include artificial versions of almost every type of obstacle and climbing hold encountered in the natural environment. Artificial walls include novel features such as volume holds and sloper holds, which indoor route setters use to challenge climbers in very specific and unusual ways. As most competition climbing events are held on indoor walls, many contemporary climbers have spent their careers training and competing on artificial indoor walls. This revolution in the design of indoor climbing holds has affected how climbers now approach outdoor routes.

Modern indoor walls can have their routes graded for technical difficulty in the same manner as outdoor natural routes. The MoonBoard climbing wall has a 'grid' of 200 climbing holds that can be climbed in over 50,000 sequences, with sequences created and graded by an online community. Even the 2024 Olympic artificial climbing walls were graded with the women's walls at up to 5.14c (8c+) for lead and V12 (8A+) for bouldering, and the men's walls at up to 5.14d (9a) for lead and V14 (8B+) for bouldering. Artificial walls have been created that have been estimated to be at or above the hardest technical grades climbed in the outdoor natural environment.

=== Recording of routes ===
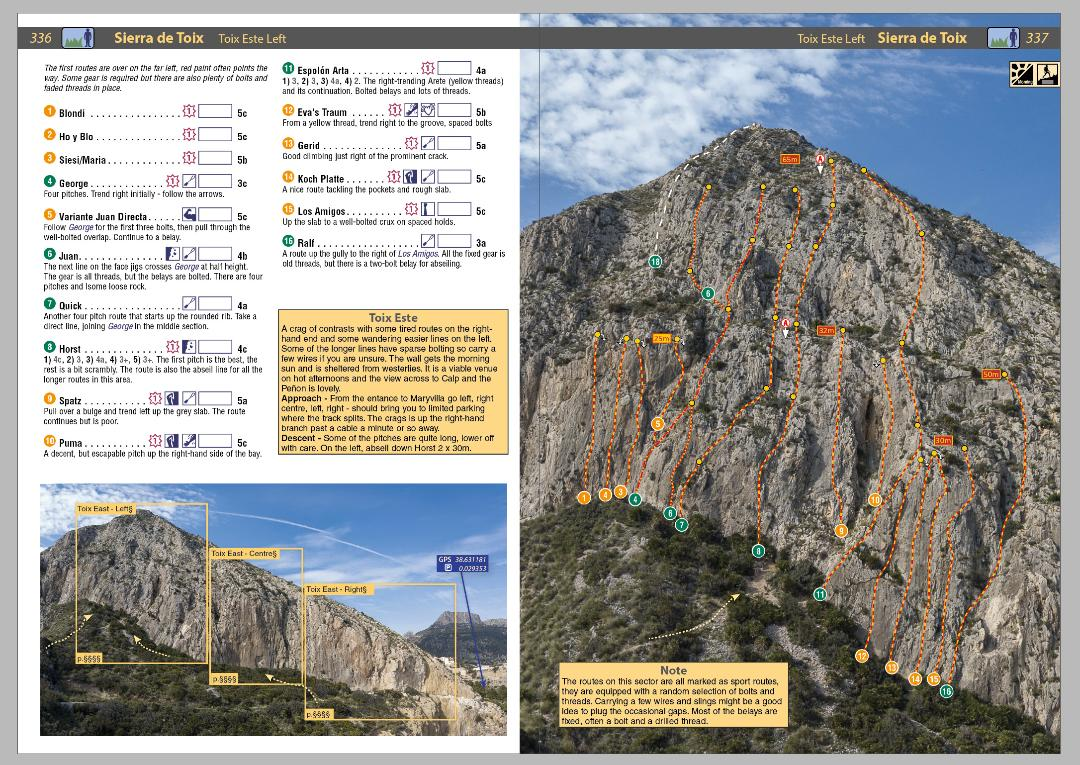
Topo image of the Toix Est in Costa Blanca in Spain in a Rockfax guidebook

The ever-growing volume and range of new rock climbing routes are recorded via specialist diagrams called topos, which are collated in climbing guidebooks and more latterly on large online rock climbing databases such as theCrag.com and MountainProject.com. Guidebooks and databases record the local consensus view on the level of difficulty of the routes, however, where this is materially lower than the actual difficulty of the routes, it is termed sandbagging.

The moves needed to complete a rock climbing route are called the beta, and popular rock climbing routes have detailed step-by-step video guides of their beta available online, and on climbing apps, and which has led to legal disputes over the ownership of the beta between online databases.

Important new first ascents are also chronicled and discussed in specialist rock climbing media, including climbing magazines and climbing journals with notable examples including Alpinist, and Climbing, which are read globally. These are supplemented by popular online climbing websites such as UK Climbing and PlanetMountain, as well as country-level specialist rock climbing magazines such as Desnivel (in Spanish), Grimper (in French) and Klettern (in German).

== Types of rock climbing ==
=== Rationale for variation ===
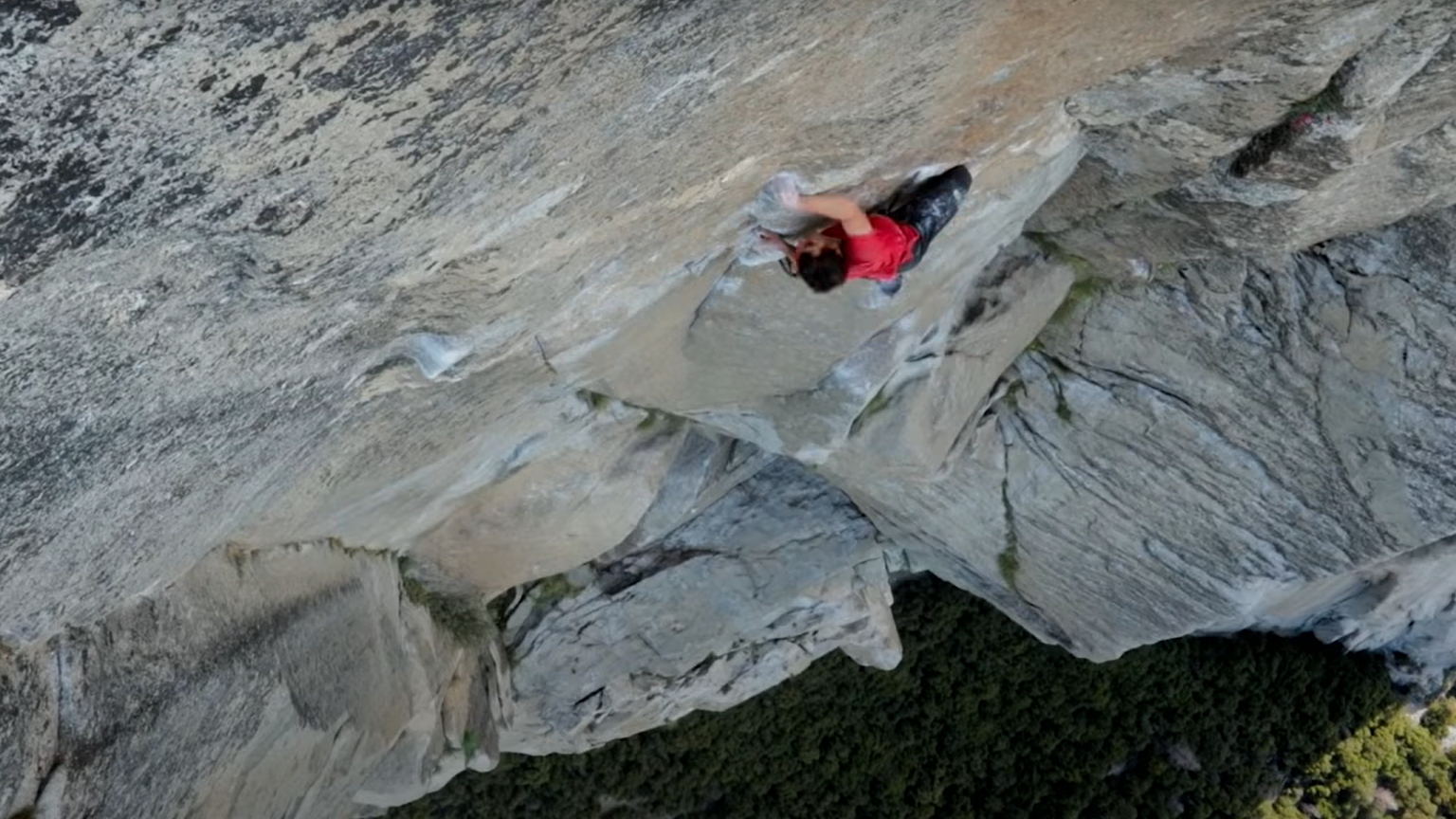
Alex Honnold's famous 2017 free solo of the big wall route, Freerider (5.13a, 7c+), on El Capitan

Rock climbing includes a wide range of types and disciplines that vary with the style being adopted on the specific climbing route, the length and number of pitches of the route, the level and type of climbing protection that will be employed on the route, and whether the climb is in a competition climbing format.

A climb can involve a combination of several types depending on the skill and risk appetite of the climber(s). For example, the famous neighbouring El Capitan routes of The Nose and Freerider both require big wall climbing techniques as they are over 1,000 metres (3,300 ft) high. They can be ascended using aid climbing (on either all or just on the hardest pitches of the route) or can be fully free climbed (The Nose is much harder and only rarely free climbed). As both are not bolted, they require traditional climbing protection to be inserted, and while it is most commonly done by pairs using lead climbing, they have both been rope solo climbed, simul climbed (particularly for setting speed climbing records), but only Freerider has been free solo climbed (see photo).

The broad range of types is helpful in offering novice climbers alternative paths into the sport. Historically, novices often started as a 'belayer' to an outdoor lead climber on a natural climbing route. Now, novices often begin with bouldering, and some never move beyond the discipline. While outdoor climbing and mountaineering clubs historically played an important role in instruction, novices climbers today often start by taking lessons at indoor climbing gyms, either in bouldering or lead climbing. Some novices join competition climbing teams and have little engagement with the outdoor climbing and mountaineering scene. The wide range of types of rock climbing has helped more people access the sport in the way that best suits them.

=== Depending on style ===
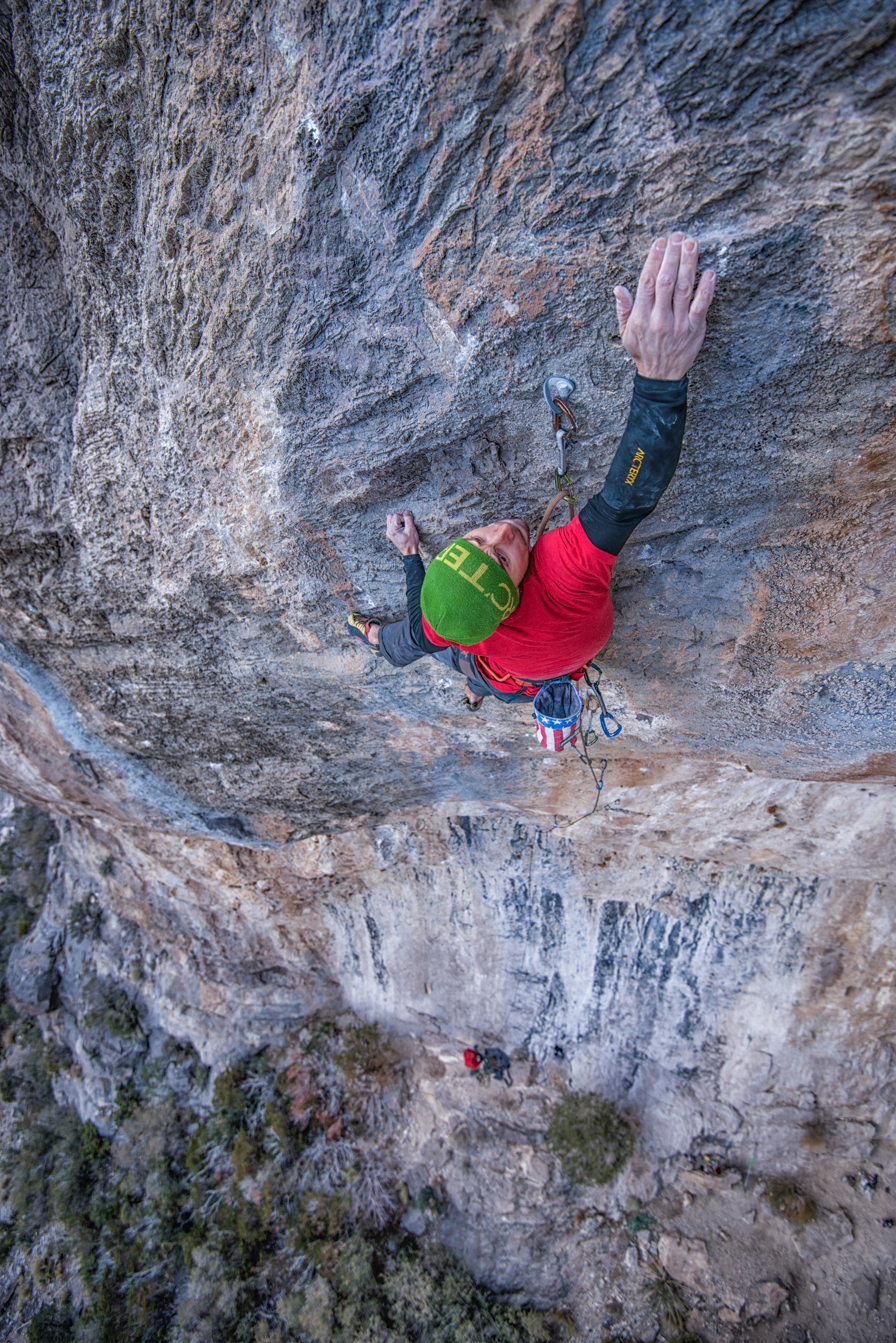
Jonathan Siegrist on the FFA of Spectrum 5.14c (8c+), Red Rocks, Nevada.

In rock climbing, the term "style" principally refers to whether the climber used any artificial aid to help them to ascend the climbing route, which is called aid climbing, or whether they used no aid whatsoever, which is called free climbing. Climbers who ascend a new route but using aid have made a first ascent (or FA), whereas climbers who ascend a new route and do it without aid have made the more coveted first free ascent (FFA). As a further refinement, some have argued that when free climbing a specific single-pitch route, 'highball bouldering' is a better "style" than 'traditional climbing', which is itself a better "style" than 'sport climbing'.

A further refinement of "style" is a free climb by a climber who had never seen the route beforehand, and had never been told about its challenges and how to overcome them (called the beta). If such a climber completes the route on their first attempt it is called an onsight. Where the climber had never seen the route beforehand but had been given beta on it, it is called a flash. A free climb where the climber attempts the route many times before finally ascending it is called a redpoint; most major new FFAs in rock climbing are done as redpoints.

In 2021, German climber Alexander Megos expanded that "style" in rock climbing should include a detailed understanding of the conditions in which an ascent was made, saying "It seems like the climbing community is not differentiating at all and rarely mentioning HOW things are climbed". He felt this is a particular concern in bouldering where using knee pads and whether the climb was commenced as a full sit start (and from what point), can affect the technical difficulty of the climb, and needed to be recorded alongside the ascent of the route.

=== Depending on length ===
The length of the climbing route materially influences the type of rock-climbing techniques that can be used and the type of rock-climbing equipment that is needed, and it is length that differentiates the three major disciplines of rock climbing which are:

Types of climbing that vary with length

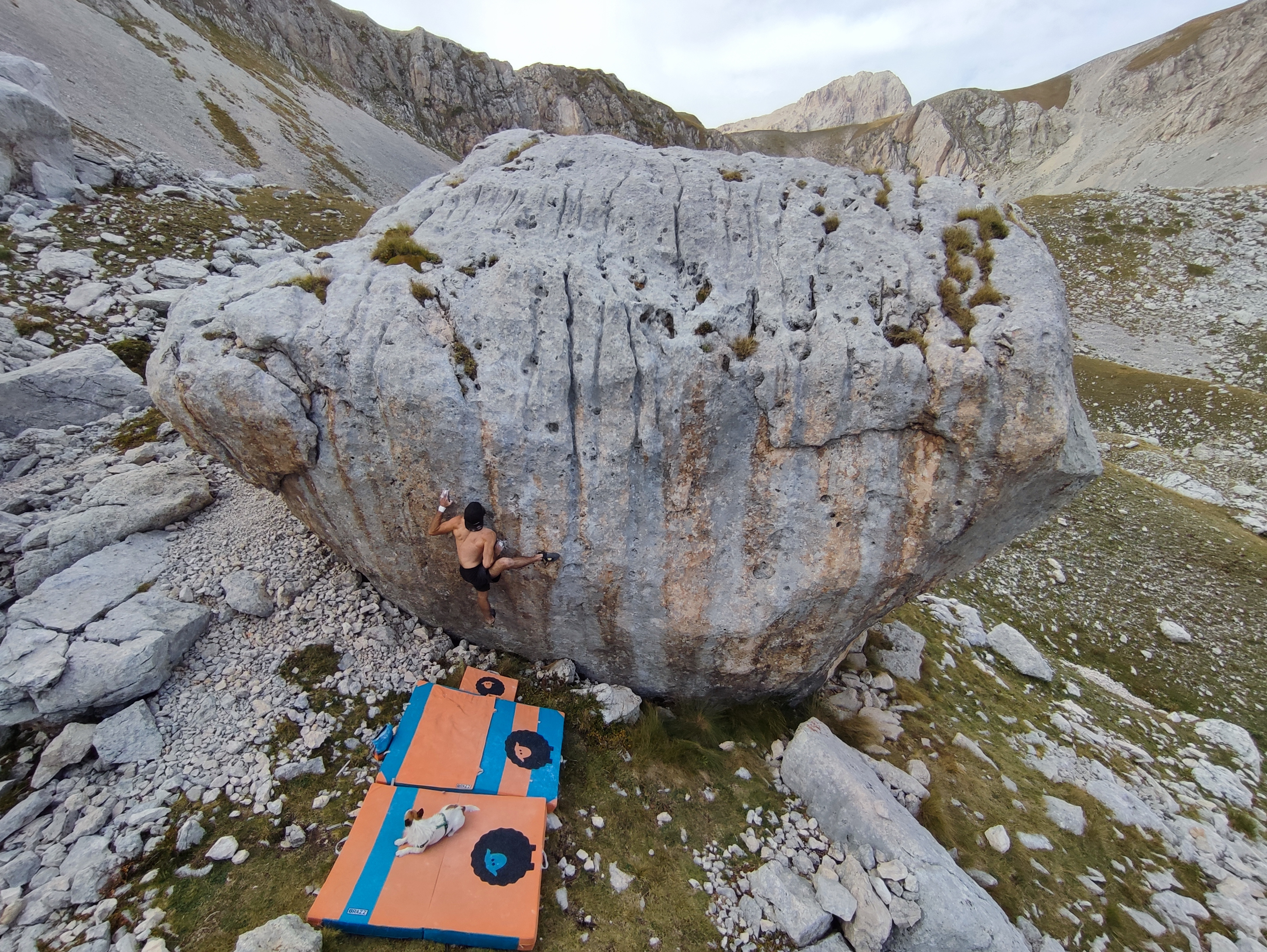
Bouldering

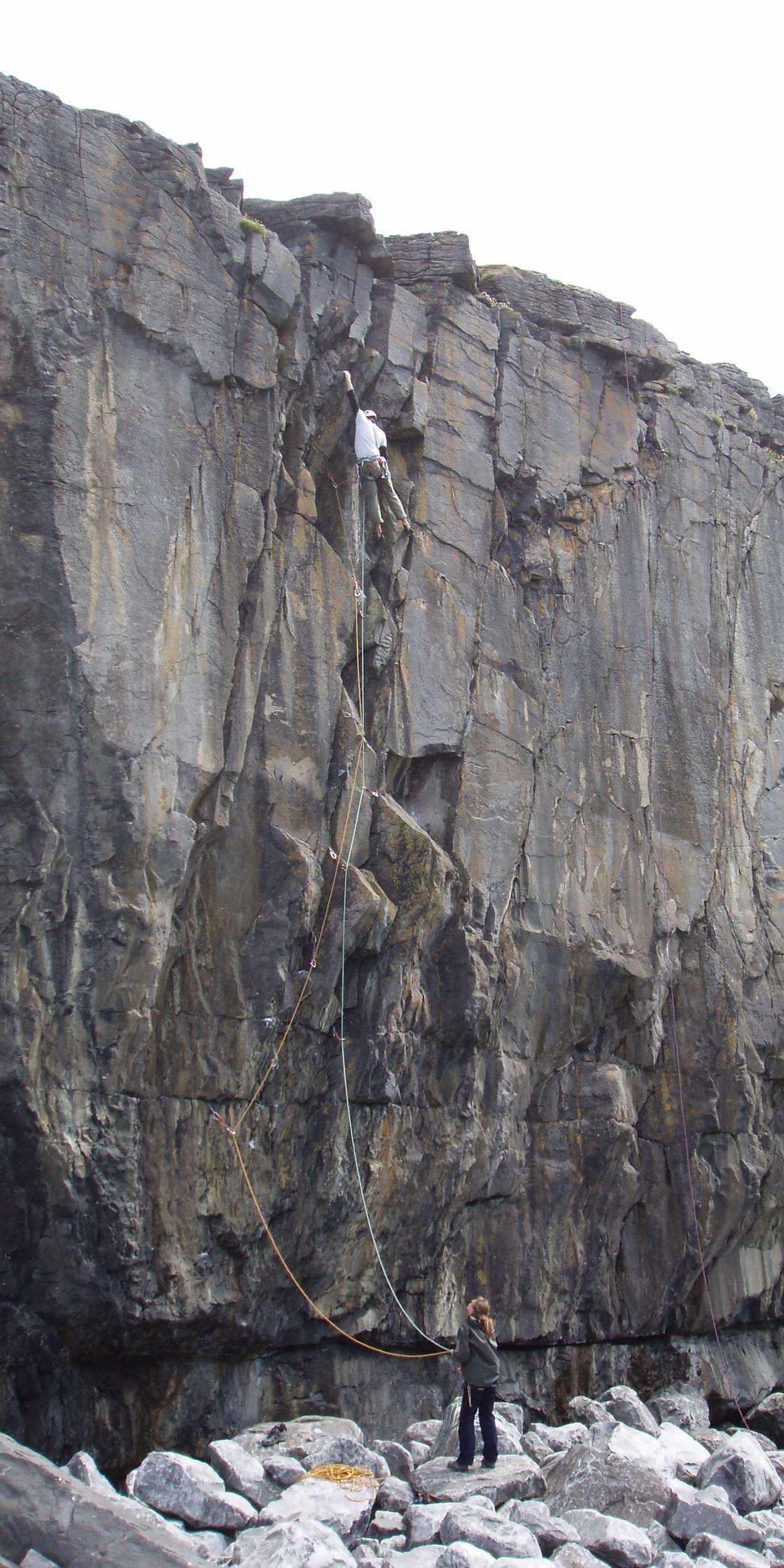
Single-pitch

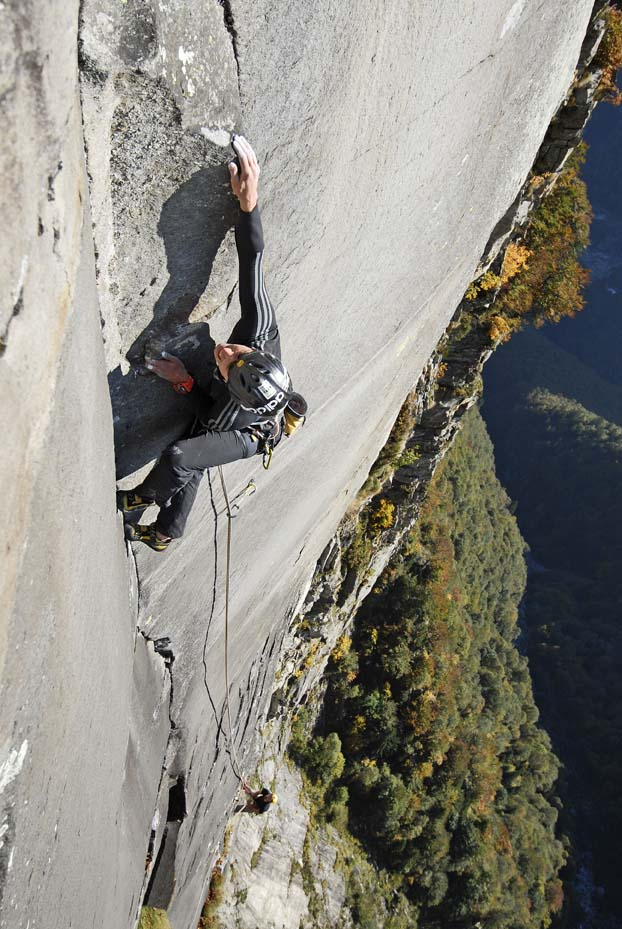
Multi-pitch

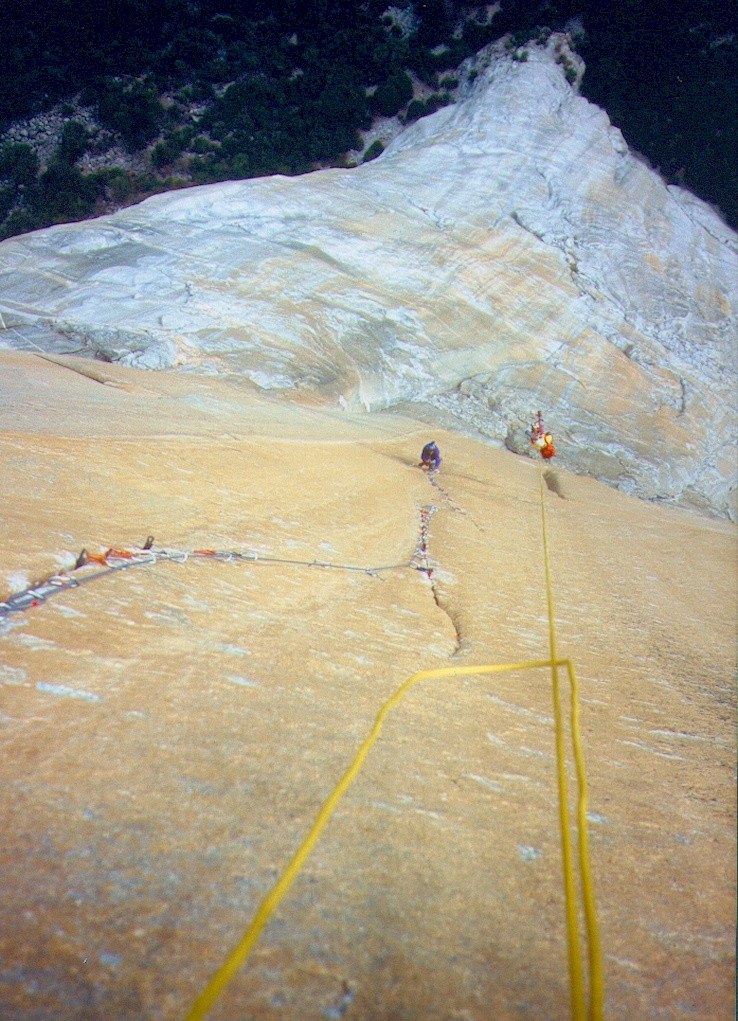
Big wall

- Bouldering. This involves short routes of up to circa 5 metres (16 ft) in height that require no climbing protection outside of bouldering mats placed on the ground to break any falls. Typically these are actual boulders (e.g. Dreamtime or Midnight Lightning), but any short route can be called "bouldering" (e.g. the crux of Hubble). Highball bouldering routes are up to circa 10–12 metres (33–39 ft) in height and therefore any fall can be more serious; the climber is now getting into the realm of free soloing; notable highballs include Livin' Large and The Process.
- Single-pitch climbing. These routes are above bouldering height and extend to the length of a climbing rope in height — which is about circa 60–70 metres (200–230 ft) — so that they can be climbed as one 'pitch'. In practice, the average single-pitch route tends to be 25–35 metres (82–115 ft) in height, and is the most common form of rock climbing in lead climbing. Important new grade milestones in free climbing are mostly set on single-pitch climbs and have included notable routes such as Action Directe, Realization, Jumbo Love and Silence.
- Multi-pitch climbing. These routes are many pitches in length and require more complicated techniques to ascend safely, particularly the use of belay anchors, hanging belays and jumaring. A further distinction is made for very sheer routes over 300–500 metres (980–1,640 ft) in length where the climber(s) are continually "hanging" from the face, which is called big wall climbing and includes some of rock climbing's most notable routes such as The Nose. The mountaineering discipline of alpine climbing, which is climbing long multi-pitch routes on mountain faces such as the Great north faces of the Alps, can involve multi-pitch rock climbing.

=== Depending on protection ===
The type of climbing protection employed also materially influences the type of rock climbing techniques used on a climbing route, regardless of whether it is single-pitch or multi-pitch (or big wall); protection doesn't apply to bouldering as none is used. The following broad distinctions are made in rock climbing types, which have been split into whether the climber is free climbing.

==== In free climbing ====
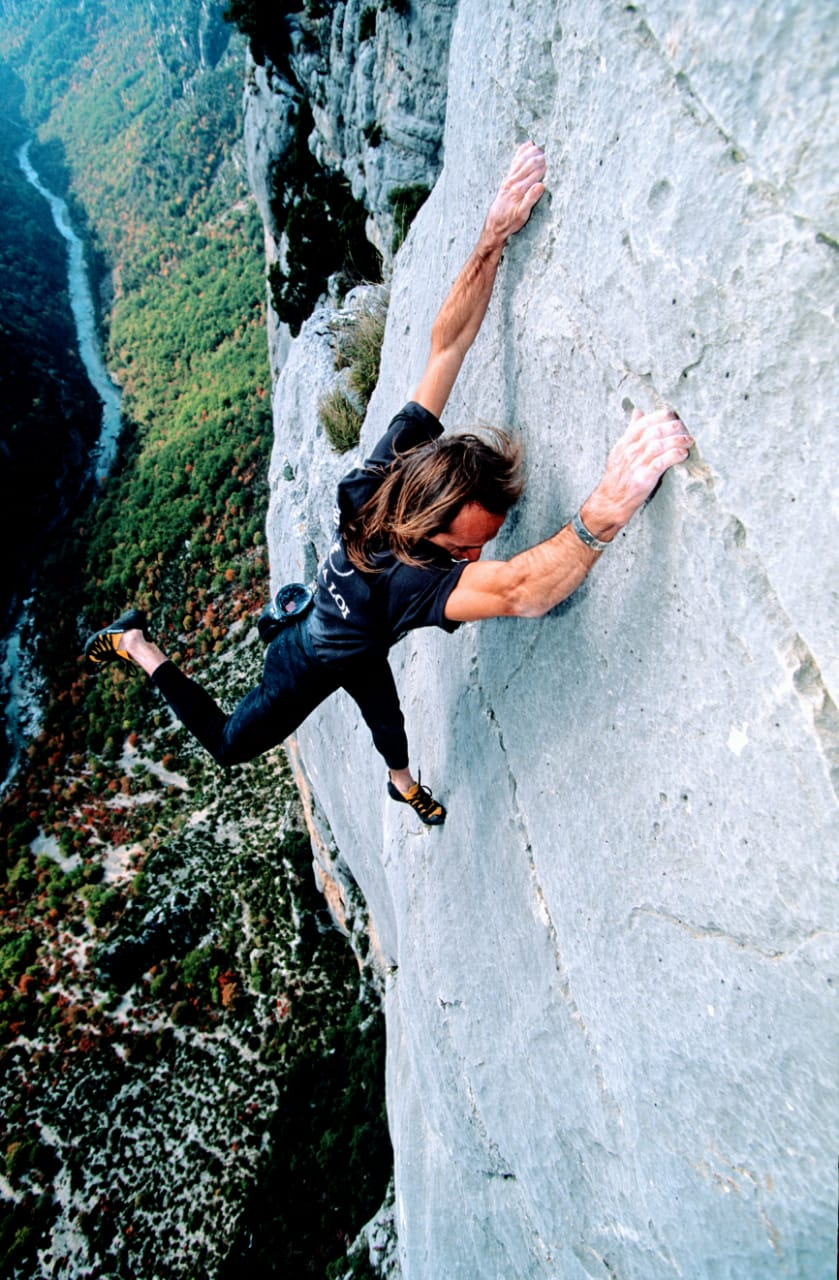
Free solo climbing

- Free solo climbing. This is climbing with no climbing protection; thus, any fall will be serious and even fatal. In theory, all bouldering is free soloing but the term is usually only applied to single-pitch climbing and multi-pitch climbing. Free solo climbing came to worldwide attention when in 2017, Alex Honnold free soloed the famous big wall climbing route, Freerider on El Capitan, as featured in the 2018 Oscar-winning film, Free Solo.
  - Deep-water soloing. A sub-class of free solo climbing done on single-pitch routes that are above water. In theory, any fall should be less serious as the climber will land in the water, fatalities have happened. The sport came to international attention after Chris Sharma's ascent of the dramatic sea-arch of Es Pontàs in 2006, whose grade ranked it as one of the world's hardest rock climbs of any type at that time.
- Lead climbing. This involves climbing in pairs with a 'lead climber', who does the climbing, and a 'belayer' (or 'second'), who holds the rope. Lead climbing is used in single-pitch and multi-pitch climbing, and for multi-pitch routes, the team can alternate the roles. The pair are connected by the climbing rope and the belayer uses belay devices to control the rope. How the rope is attached to the rock face, depends on the following:
  Different types of lead climbing
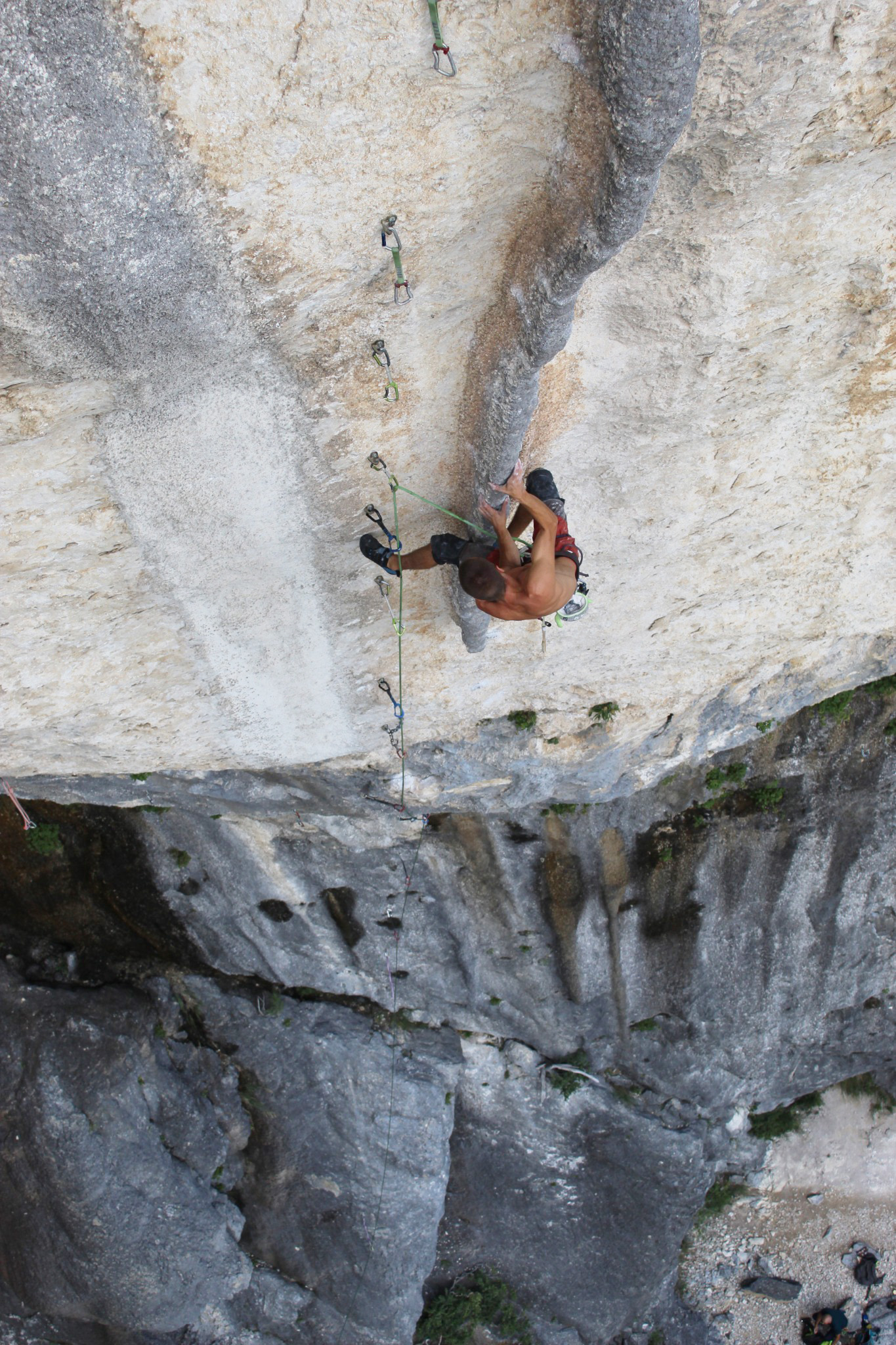
  Leading a sport climbing route with quickdraws hanging from pre-drilled bolts
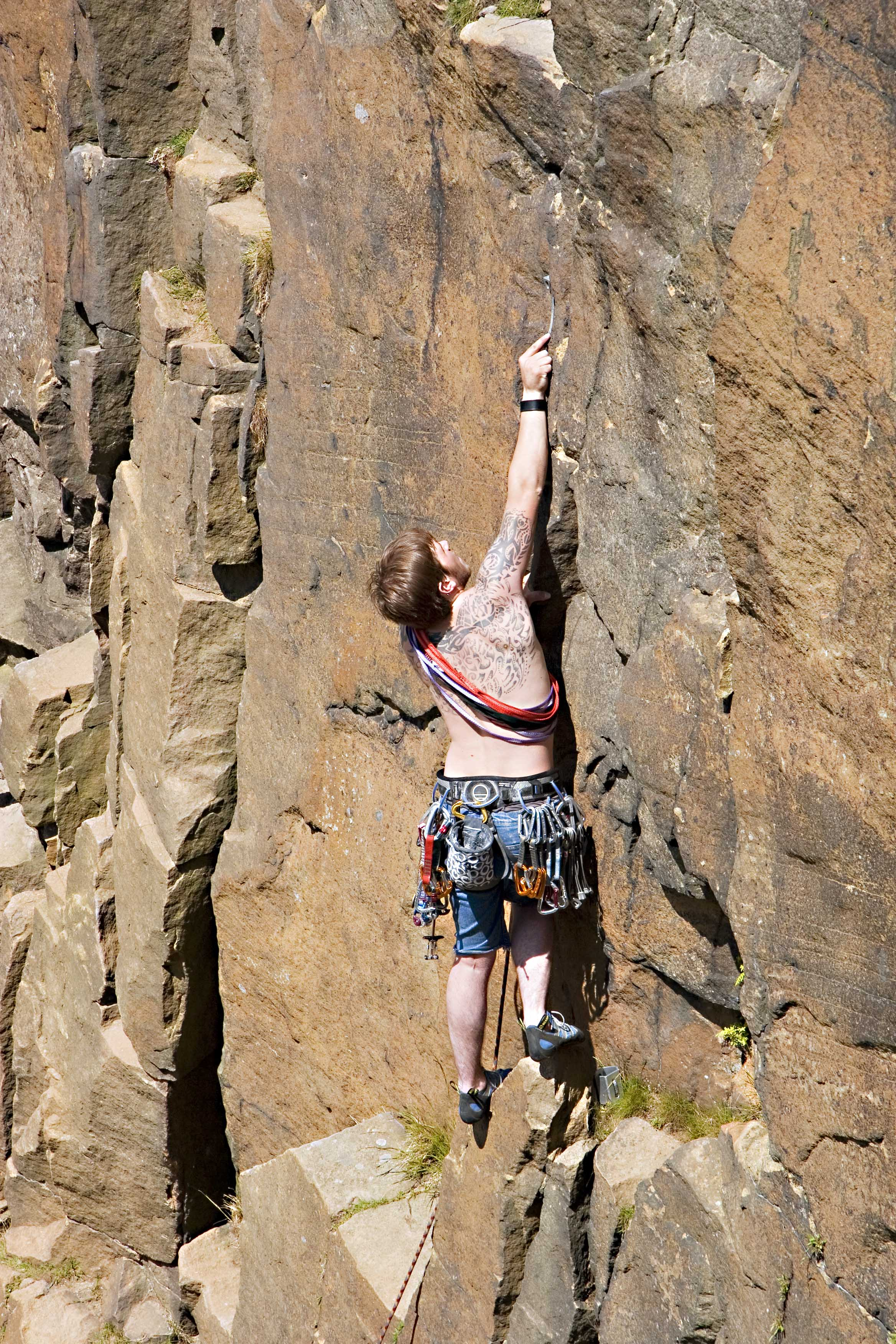
  Leading a traditional climbing route where the climber is inserting the protection
  - Traditional climbing. Originally all leading was traditional where the 'lead climber' inserts temporary (or removable) protection as they ascend. There are many types of temporary protection including passive (e.g. nuts and hexes), and active (e.g. SLCDs). Traditional climbing is much riskier and more physically demanding than sport climbing as finding places in which to insert the protection — while simultaneously ascending — drains energy, and poor placements can lead to protection failing in the event of a fall.
  - Sport climbing. Here, the climbing protection has been pre-drilled into the rock in the form of bolts. The 'lead climber' clips their rope into these bolts using quickdraws as they ascend. On very hard routes, the quickdraws are placed in advance, which is called 'pinkpointing' (see photo). Sport climbing developed in the 1980s when French climbers wanted to climb "blank" rock faces that had no cracks into which to insert the temporary protection used in traditional climbing and they called it 'sport climbing' as it was much safer.
- Rope solo climbing. Where a 'lead climber' climbs alone but with protection; the 'belayer' is replaced with a progress capture device (PCD) that locks the rope — in the manner of a 'belayer' — in any fall. It is an advanced technique and difficult to master, and which carries significantly greater risk as PCDs can fail to lock, and it requires much greater energy as the climber needs to ascend every pitch twice.
- Simul climbing. Where both of the 'lead climbing pair' move together and dispense with the traditional set-up of a 'lead climber' doing the climbing while the 'belayer' stays in one place to control the rope. A simul-climbing pair will insert points of climbing protection as they progress — as in normal lead climbing — but will add PCDs at some of these points to lock the rope in case one or both of them fall. Simil climbing is used to move quickly on long but easy multi-pitch routes, and for setting speed climbing records on big-wall routes. It is an advanced and a dangerous technique.

==== In other climbing ====
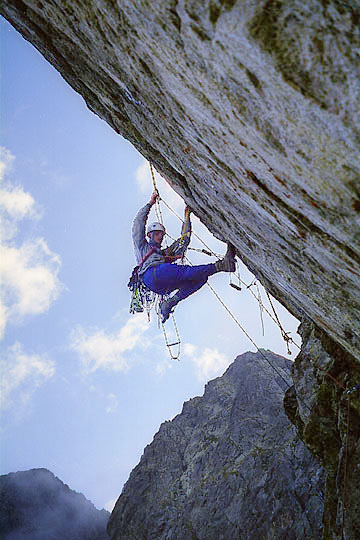
Aid climbing

- Aid climbing. Modern aid climbing is typically used on big-wall and on alpine-climbing routes where the level of difficulty is not uniform, and a given pitch might require aid techniques to overcome its challenges. For example, The Nose on El Capitan which can be climbed by strong big wall climbers using aid techniques on some pitches, but only a handful of the world's leading climbers have completely free climbed all pitches.
- Top rope climbing. This is done in pairs but the rope runs from the belayer through a fixed anchor at the top of the route, and back down to the climber. If the climber falls, the belayer locks the rope and the climber just hangs from the rope at the point of the fall. The technique allows the belayer to give the climber aid by holding some or all of their weight while they climb, and is thus not strictly free-climbing. Top rope climbing is a popular way for beginners to start rock climbing, and to build up their strength and confidence to lead climb.
  - Top rope solo climbing. This is a solo-climbing variant of top roping where the climber uses a progress capture device (PCD) that automatically locks the rope if the climber falls (like a belayer). Unlike top-rope climbing, top-rope solo climbing is an advanced type of climbing, and there have been fatalities where the PCD did not automatically lock and the climber fell to the ground; it is also used in big wall climbing.

=== Competition climbing ===
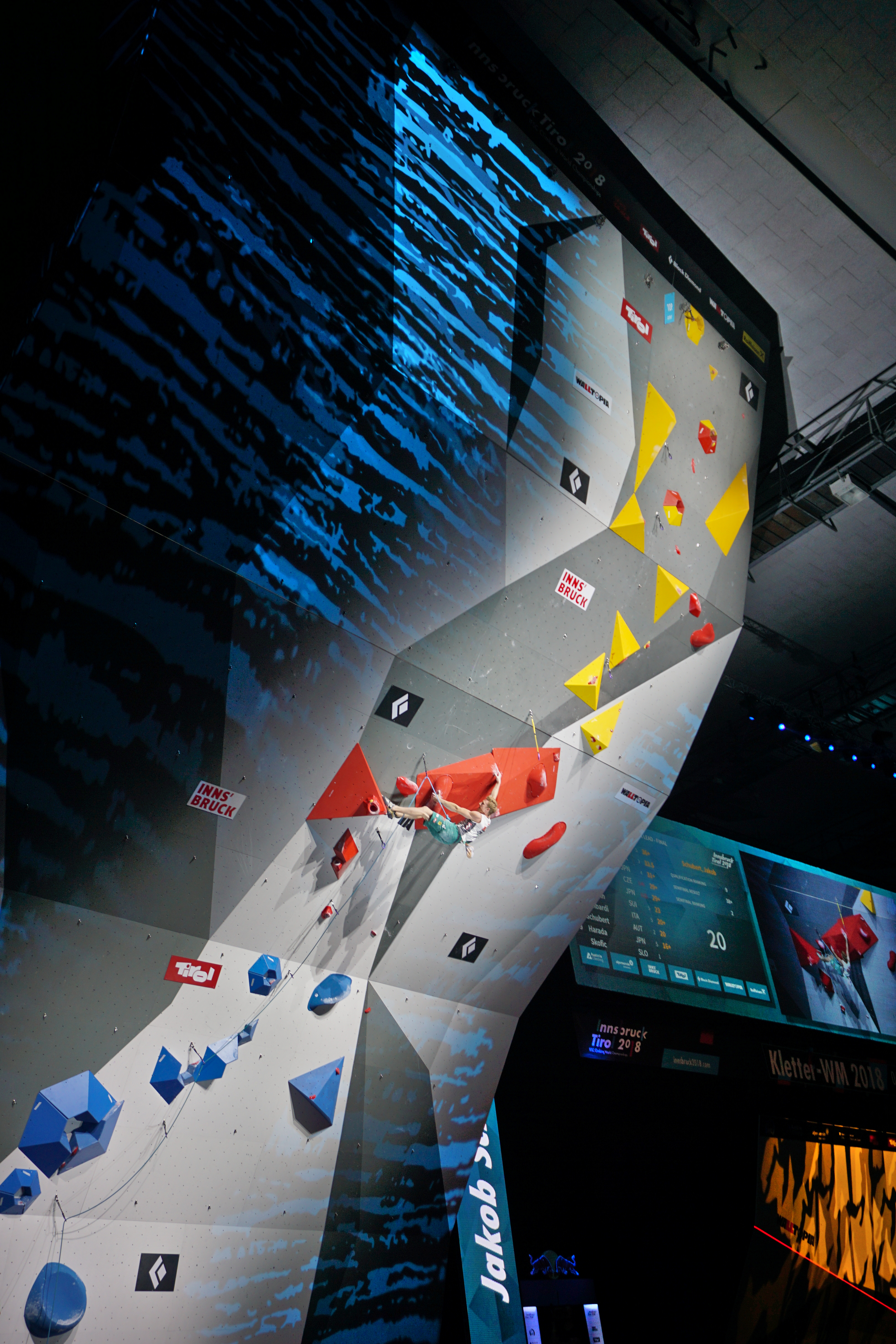
World Championships

With the development of the safer form of sport climbing in the 1980s, lead climbing competitions on bolted artificial climbing walls became popular. In 1988, the Union Internationale des Associations d'Alpinisme (UIAA) created rules and created the International Council for Competition Climbing (ICCC) to regulate competition climbing, and in 1998, the ICCC added bouldering and speed climbing as new events. In 2007, the International Federation of Sport Climbing (IFSC) took over the governance of the sport and its two major competitions, the annual Climbing World Cup and the biennial Climbing World Championships; it debuted as a full Olympic-medal sport in 2020:

- Competition lead climbing. Competitors start at the bottom of a pre-bolted artificial sport-climbing route and lead-climb to touch or secure the highest climbing hold possible within a set time limit on a single attempt, making sure to clip the rope into pre-placed quickdraws while ascending; they are belayed by an official.
- Competition bouldering. Competitors climb a series of short bouldering problems without a rope but protected by crashpads, with an emphasis on the number of problems completed, and the attempts necessary to do so. The problems tend to be technically harder than in competition lead climbing and involve very dynamic moves.
- Competition speed climbing. Competitors race-off in pairs on a standardized 'speed climbing wall' using a top rope with an auto belay for protection, in the shortest time possible. As the speed climbing wall is standardized, time records are chronicled (e.g. such as world record and women's record times).
- Competition combined climbing. In some competitions, a "combined" event is offered, which in some cases is simply the addition of the scores from leading, bouldering, and/or speed climbing (as per the first Olympics), but in other cases is a separate event where the winners of the lead and bouldering events enter into a separate joint event on both formats (as per the IFSC World Championships).

=== Paraclimbing ===
Paraclimbing, or adaptive climbing, came to public prominence with Mark Wellman's ascent of the The Shield route on El Capitan in July 1989. Even before Wellman's ascent, paraclimbers such as Hugh Herr had adapted their style and equipment to ascend challenging rock climbing routes, which in Herr's case included ascents of notable 5.13 (7c+) graded routes such as Vandals in the Shawgunks. By 2006, World Climbing (then the IFSC) held the first official paraclimbing competition-climbing event in Yekaterinburg in Russia, and by 2008, the first official Paraclimbing Cup event was organised at the Moscow-leg of the World Cup Series. In 2010, the first Paraclimbing Cup Series was organised, and in 2011, and the first Paraclimbing World Championships was held in Arco in Italy. Paraclimbing will make its debut at the 2028 Summer Paralympics in Los Angeles with eight medal events covering the disciplines of lead climbing, bouldering and of speed climbing.

== Equipment ==
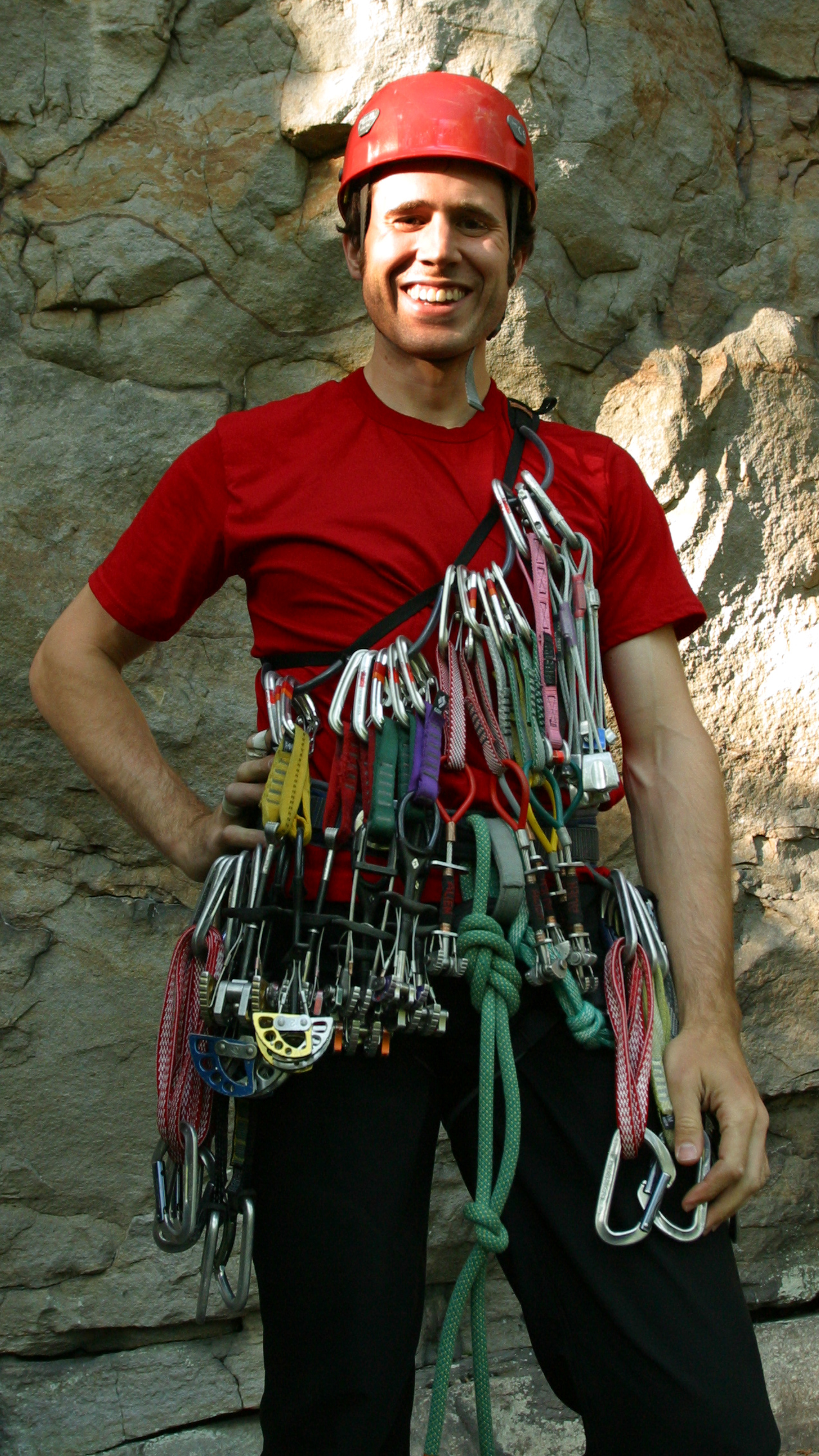
Rock climber with a helmet, harness & rope, and a traditional climbing "rack" of protection devices on their harness and additional gear sling, which contains SLCDs, nuts, a tricam, and quickdraws

The equipment needed varies significantly with the route being undertaken and the type of climbing that is being followed. For example, bouldering needs the least equipment outside of climbing shoes, climbing chalk, and optional crash pads. Sport climbing adds ropes, harnesses, belay devices, and quickdraws to clip into pre-drilled bolts. Traditional climbing adds the need to carry a "rack" of temporary passive and active protection devices. Multi-pitch climbing, and the related big wall climbing, adds devices to assist in ascending and descending fixed ropes. Finally, aid climbing uses unique equipment to assist the climber in their upward movement (e.g. aiders).

The equipment used in rock climbing can be grouped into the following categories:

- Ropes and slings. Modern climbing ropes are 50–80 metres (160–260 ft) long and can be dynamic ropes, which stretch to absorb the energy of a falling climber (and thus absorb higher fall factors), or can be the less expensive but more hard-wearing static ropes for fixed ropeing. Double ropes will reduce rope drag.
- Rope connectors. Various devices are used to connect items to climbing ropes and to slings that include equipment such as metal carabiners and quickdraws, lanyard and personal anchor systems, and also includes the climbing harness, which connects the climber themselves to their rope.
- Rope devices. Devices are available for controlling the movement of a dynamic climbing rope (e.g. such as belay devices and self-locking devices), for moving up a fixed static rope (e.g. such as ascenders), or for moving down a fixed static rope (e.g. such as descenders or abseil devices).
- Protection devices. Temporary protection is used in traditional climbing and splits into active devices (mainly spring-loaded camming devices or SLCDs or 'friends'), and passive devices (mainly nuts and hexes). Fixed protection devices are used in sport and aid climbing, and are mainly bolts and pitons.
- Aid climbing equipment. Aiders and daisy chains act like ladders for the aid climber. These aiders are clipped into the protection devices (see above), however, aid climbers can also hammer into the rock additional options like copperheads and hooks.
- Clothing. Modern climbing shoes give rock climbers increased grip and ability to step onto and hold tiny 'edges' (called edging). Climbers also use climbing helmets (especially in multi-pitch climbing), and specialised equipment such as belay gloves and belay glasses when belaying.
- Miscellaneous. One of the most distinctive aspects of modern rock climbing is the use of climbing chalk for grip and medical tape for skin wear. Once controversial, the use of knee pads and ground coverage from bouldering mats have now become commonplace at climbing venues.
- Training. One of the key elements in the development of standards and grade milestones has come from novel training tools starting with the bachar ladder, and the hangboard, which evolved into plyometric training tools such as the campus board, and the MoonBoard.

== Techniques ==
The development of rock-climbing techniques was as important as the development of rock-climbing equipment in increasing standards and reaching new grade milestones. Several techniques were particularly notable for their impact on the sport — and on particular types of climbing routes — and are key for any aspiring rock climber to master. The development of route setters in competition climbing, who can artificially fine-tune a route to require the accurate use of specific techniques, has further increased the range of techniques that contemporary rock climbers need to master.

=== Body positioning and balance ===
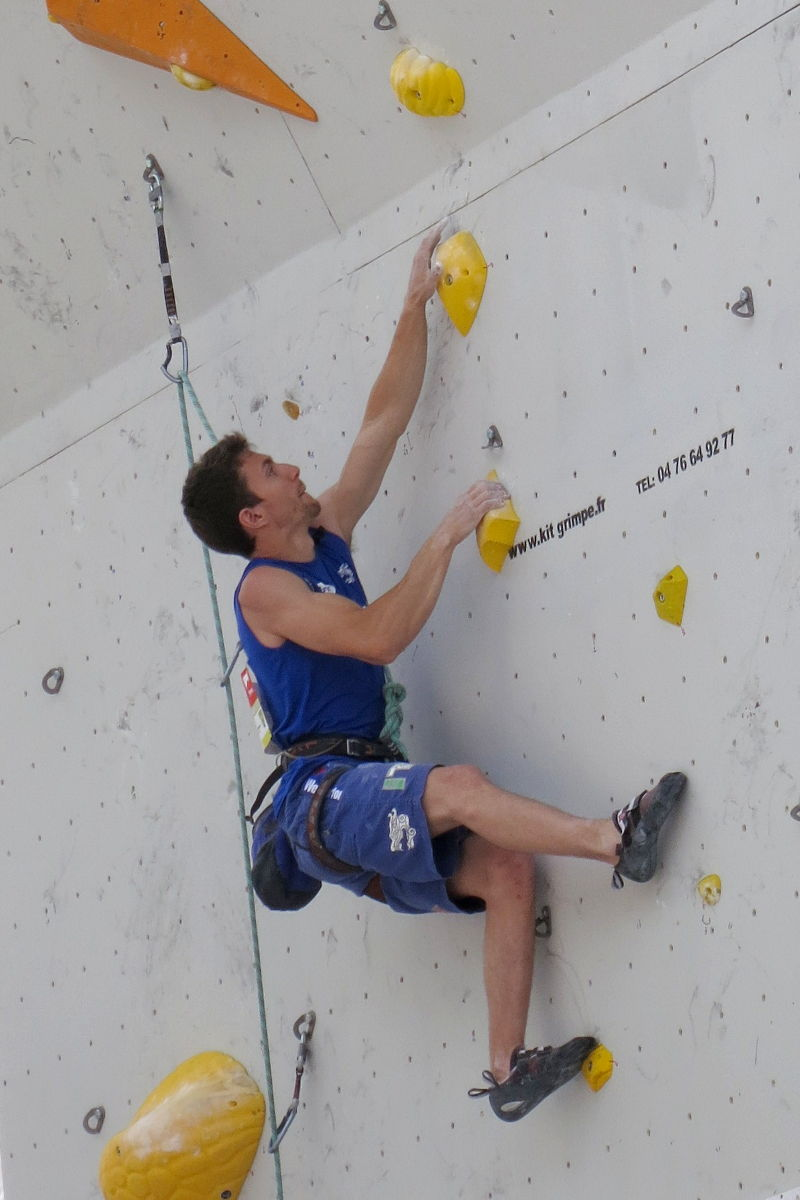
Backstepping

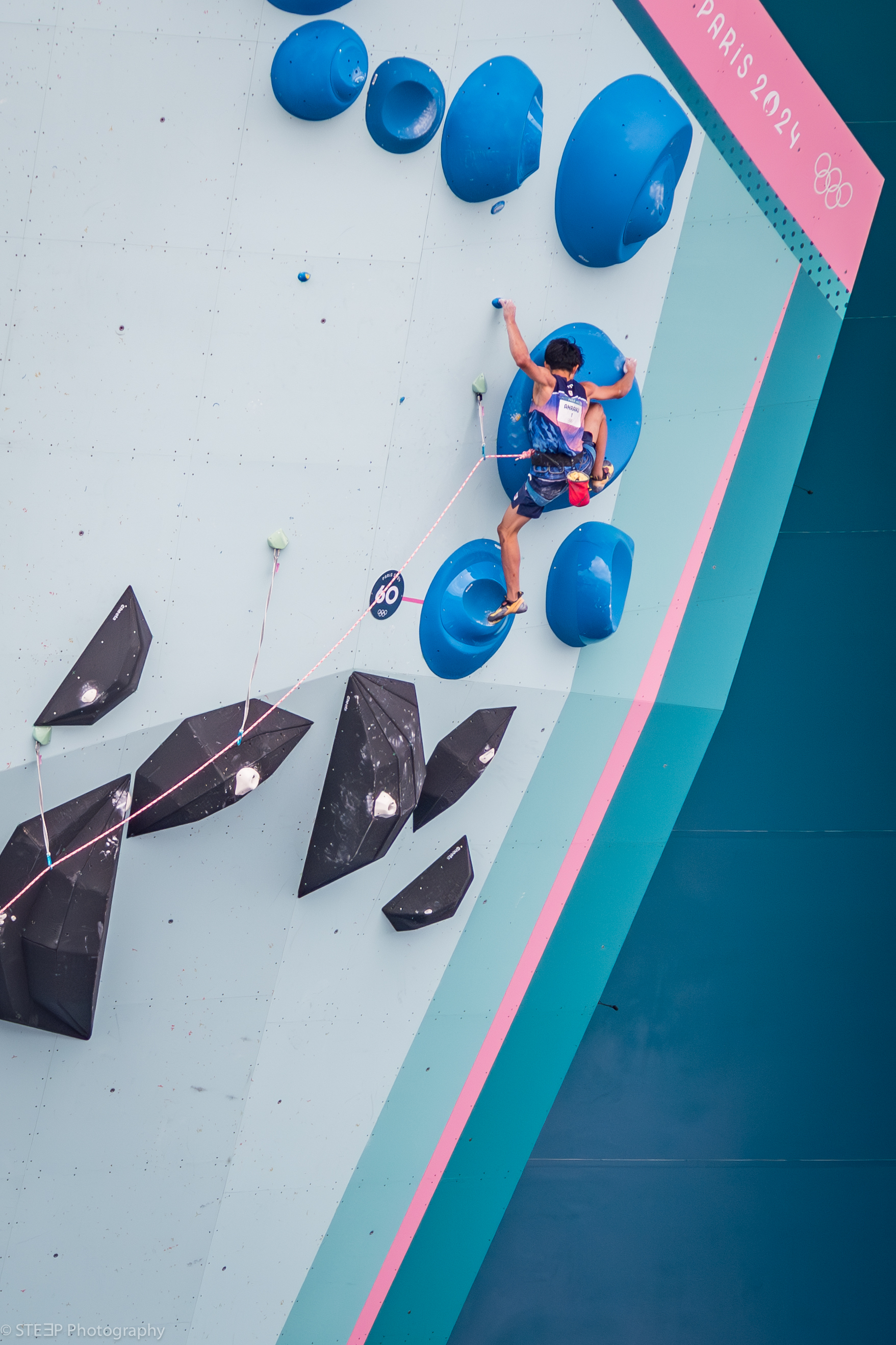
High-stepping

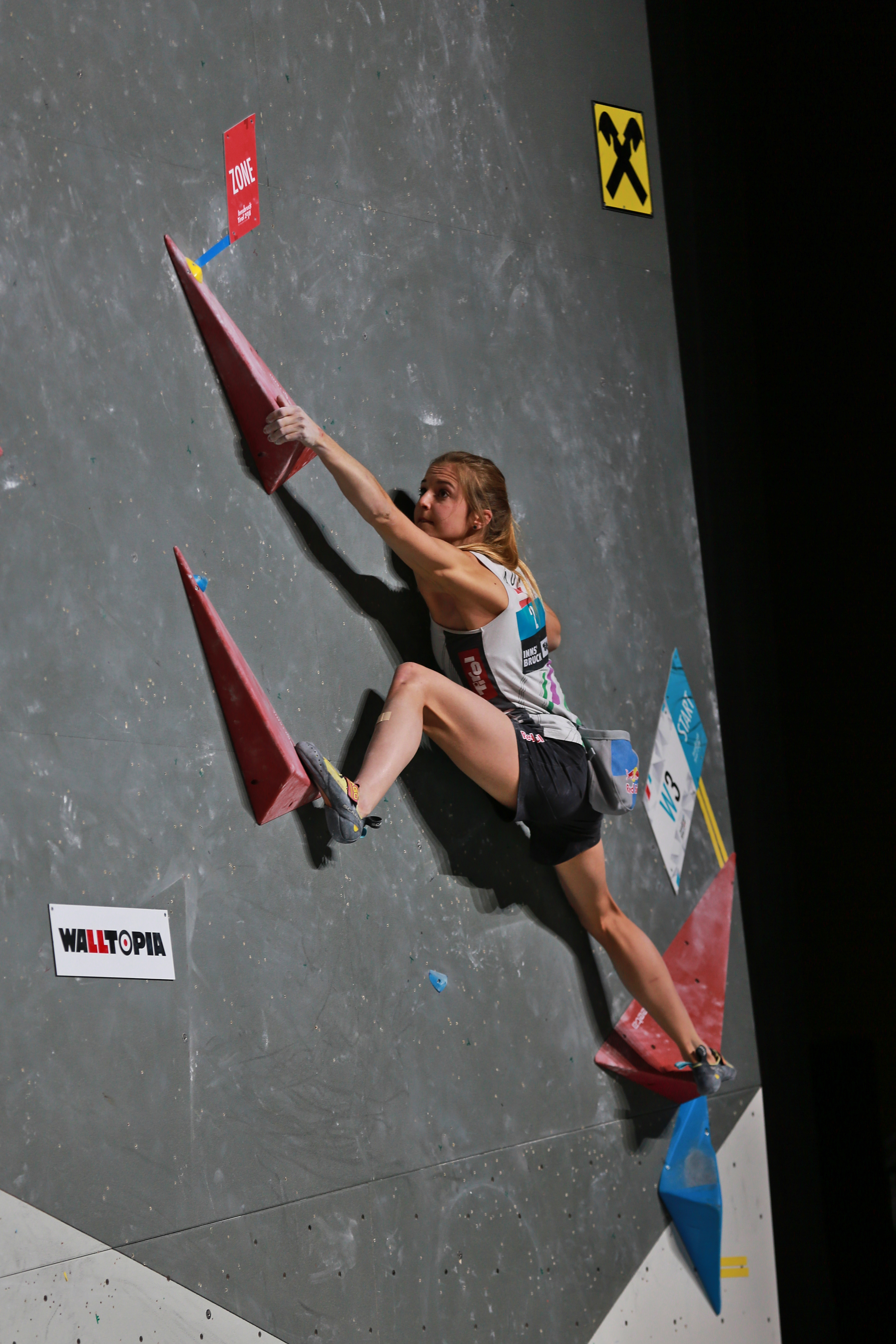
Rock-on move

Rock-climbing technique is built on having an effective body position and balance to maximise the conservation of energy and thus climb efficiently. Where possible, the arms should be kept straight, thus holding the body weight on the joints and not on flexed arm muscles, with the 'climbing' driven by the stronger legs.

The hips should be kept close to the wall, which often involves the technique of 'back-stepping', where instead of the climber using their big toe to 'toe-into' a foot-hold, they rotate their hips and use the outside edge of their opposite leg; this gives them greater upward reach while keeping their hips close to the rock face. Linked to 'back-stepping' is the use of the free leg as a counter-balance to avoid the climber swinging away from the rock, and to support other movements, which is called 'flagging'.

Good climbing technique emphasises the use of the legs to hold body weight and to gain upward momentum, which includes the technique of 'high-stepping' (i.e. lifting the feet above the waistline), which can be combined with 'heel hooking' (see image below), and the technique of 'rock-over' / 'rock-on' weight-transfer movements (i.e. transferring the weight to the higher leg but without explicitly pulling up on the arms).

=== Laybacking, bridging, and chimneying ===
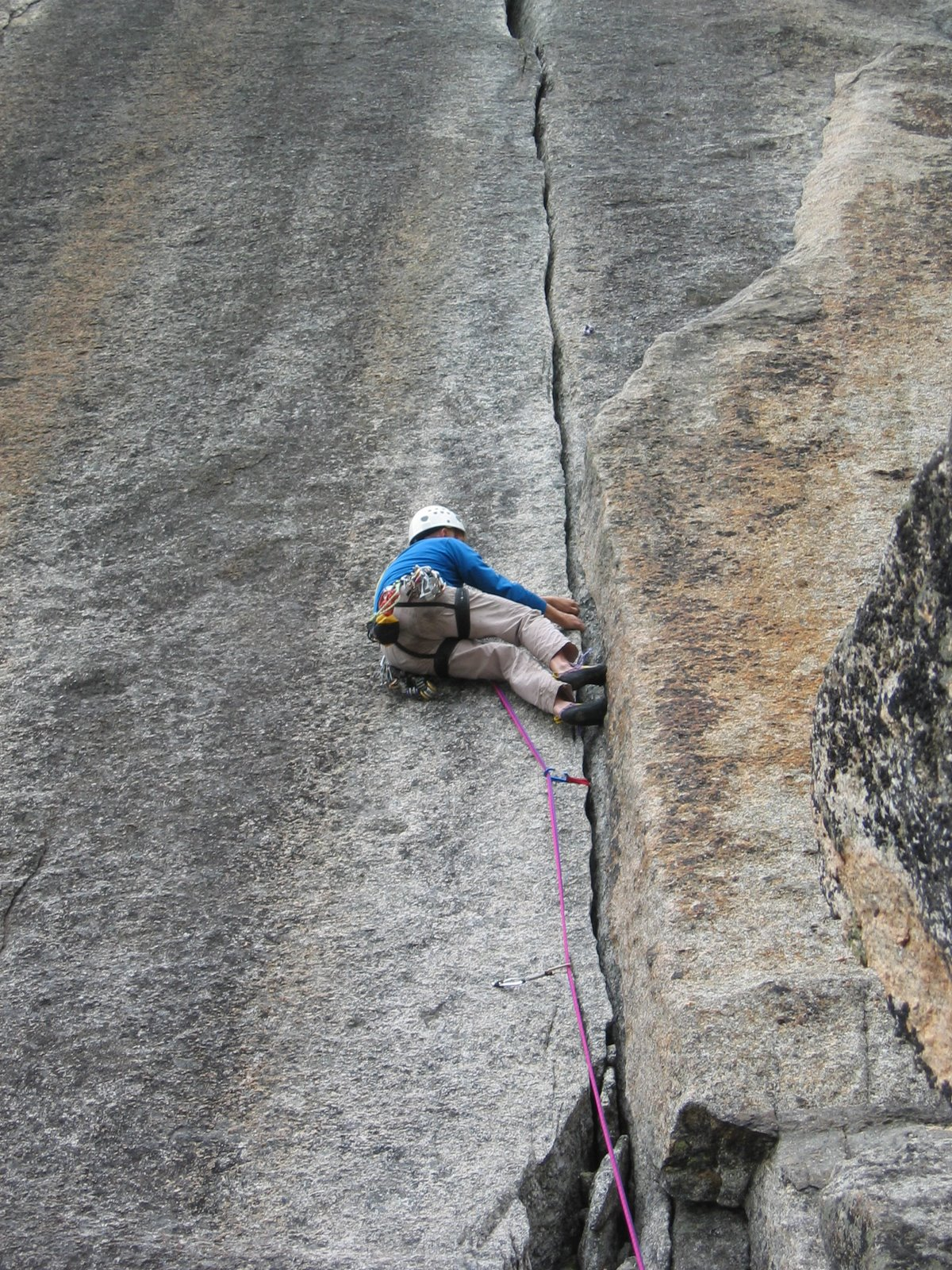
Laybacking

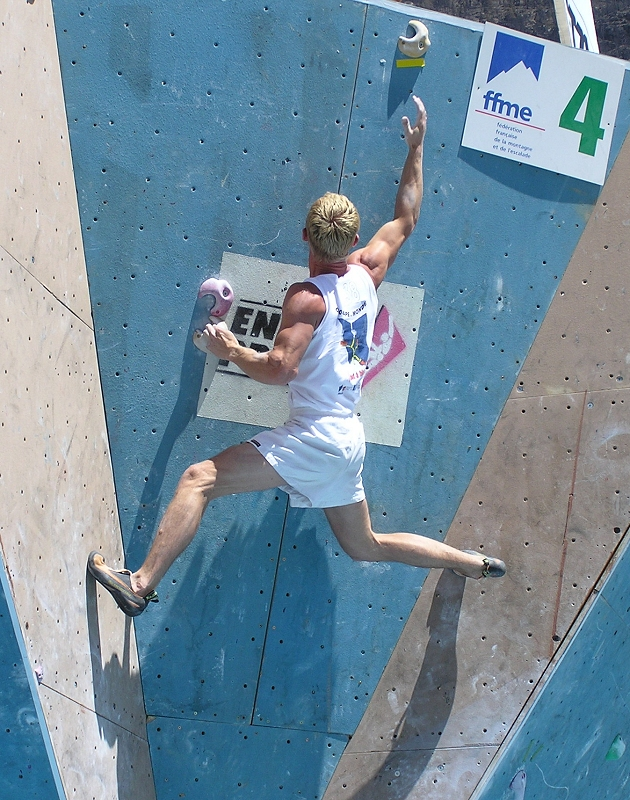
Bridging

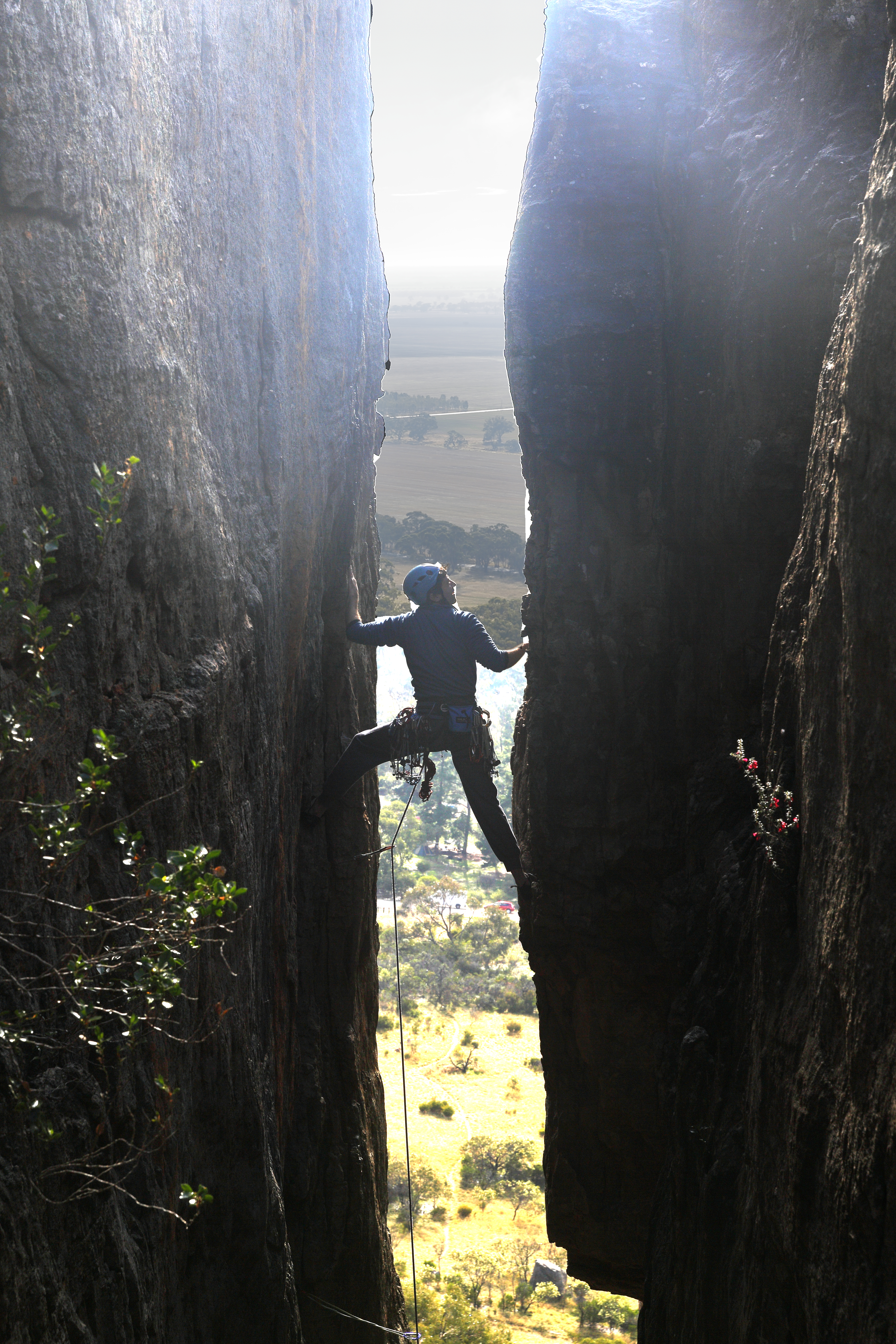
Chimneying

Early rock climbers began to distinguish themselves from general mountaineering scrambling techniques by executing a 'layback' (see image) which involves using the legs and arms in opposing forces to ascend cracks in corners or dihedrals. Ascending corners naturally leads to the related technique of 'bridging' (also called 'stemming'), which involves spreading the legs to gain traction on the opposing walls of the corner. In places where the walls are completely opposing, the technique of bridging becomes the even more spectacular technique of 'chimneying'.

Laybacking and bridging enabled rock climbers to ascend dramatic new types of specialist climbing routes that typically combined the corners and cracks needed for these techniques to work. Famous early examples include Joe Brown's Cenotaph Corner in 1952 in Dinas Cromlech in Wales. Notable modern examples of routes that require advanced laybacking and bridging include the much-photographed crux-pitch of the big wall route, Pre-Muir Wall, on El Capitan, and the groove-pitch of the multi-pitch route, The Quarryman, in Wales.

=== Jamming ===
Types of jamming

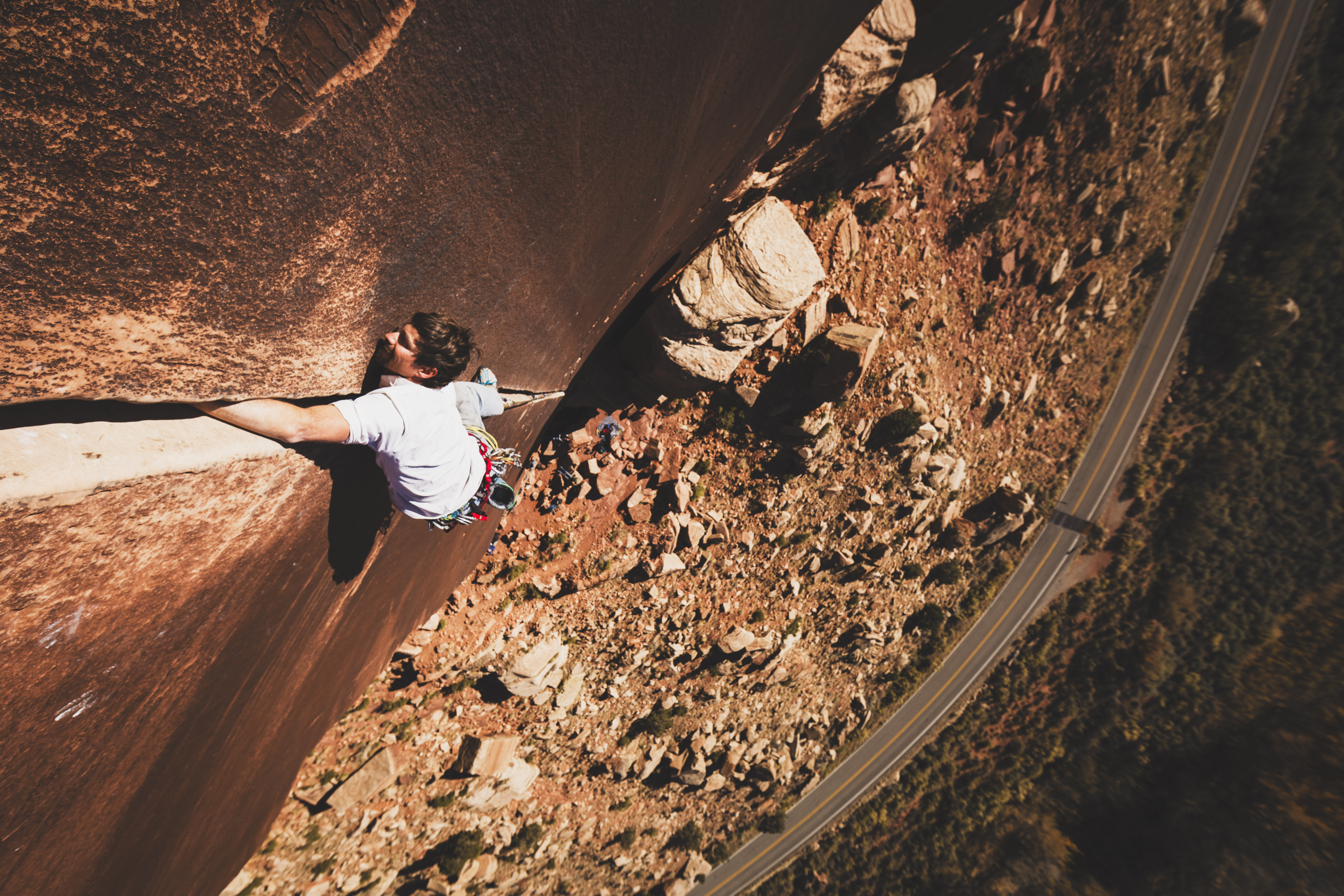
Arm

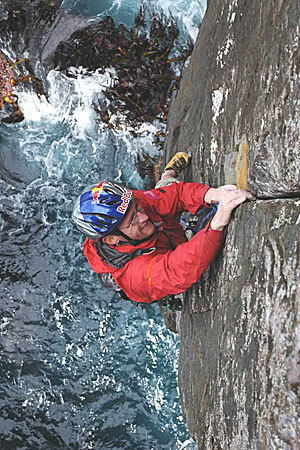
Finger

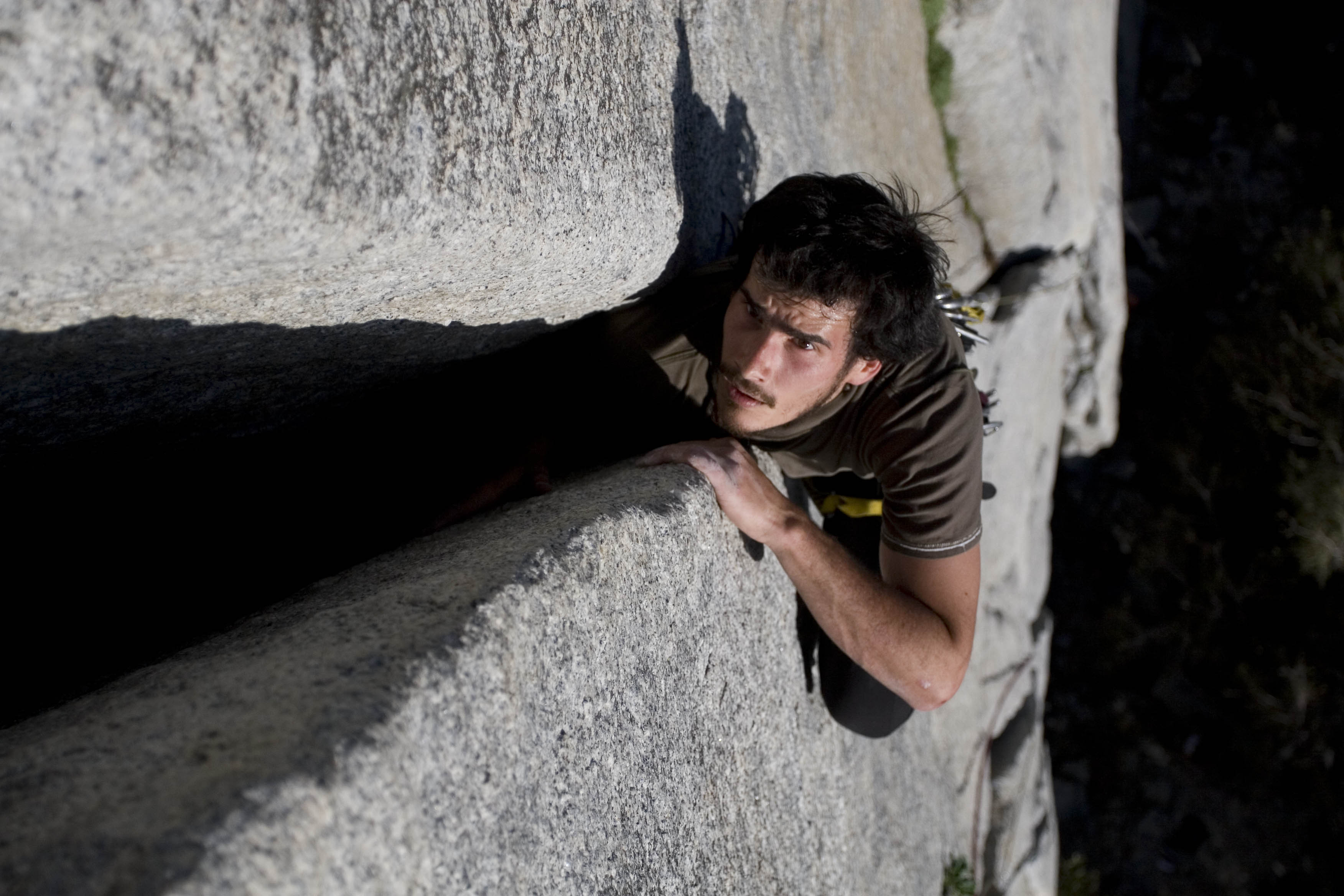
Body

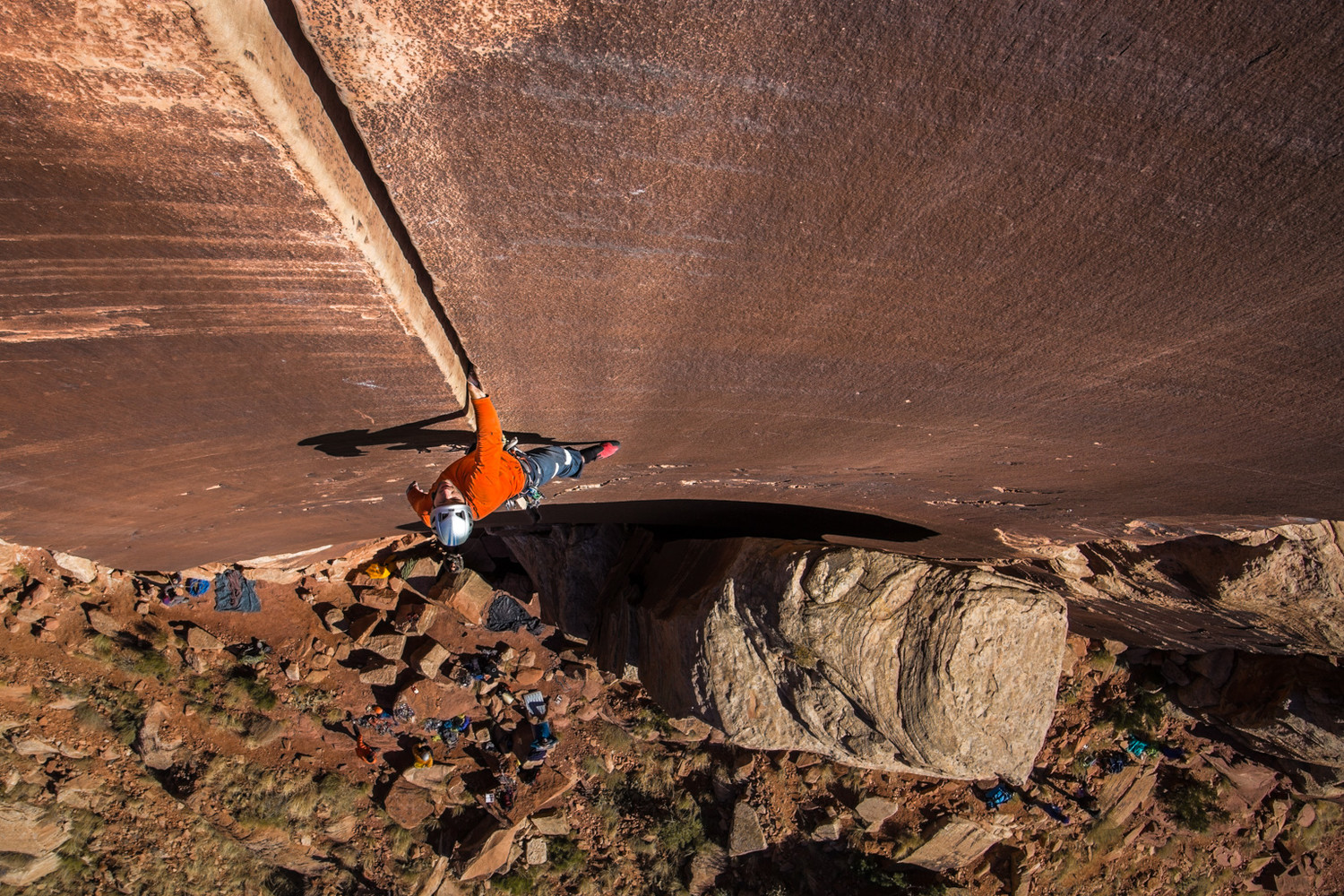
Hand

One of the most important revolutions in rock climbing technique was the development of 'jamming'. This involves placing — or "jamming" — the climber's body parts into cracks in the rock which they then pull on to gain upward momentum. Jamming brought free climbing to the world of 'crack climbing', and rock climbers developed the technique for almost every body part, including the "body jam" (i.e. the whole body in the crack), the "arm jam", the "hand/fist jam", the "toe jam", and the "finger jam".

Jamming techniques were notably employed on the long granite cracks of El Capitan, where they were used to free up important routes such as The Nose and The Salathe Wall, as well as on the photographic sandstone 'splitter cracks' of Indian Creek such as on the famous crack climbing route, Supercrack.

Finger jamming was also used to open harder routes up very thin cracks on many rock types around the world, and remains an important technique on the world's hardest traditional climbing routes — where cracks are needed to insert the temporary climbing protection — with notable examples such as on Cobra Crack (and its famous and painful one-finger jam) and on the micro-cracks of Rhapsody.

=== Smearing and palming ===
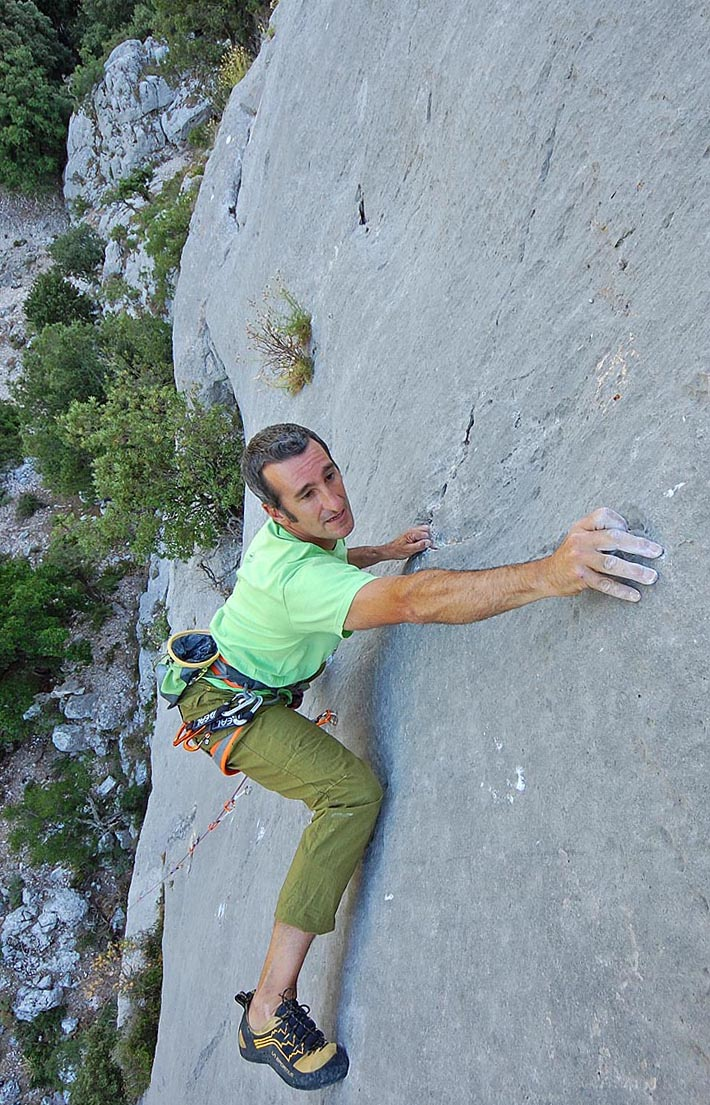
Smearing on natural rock

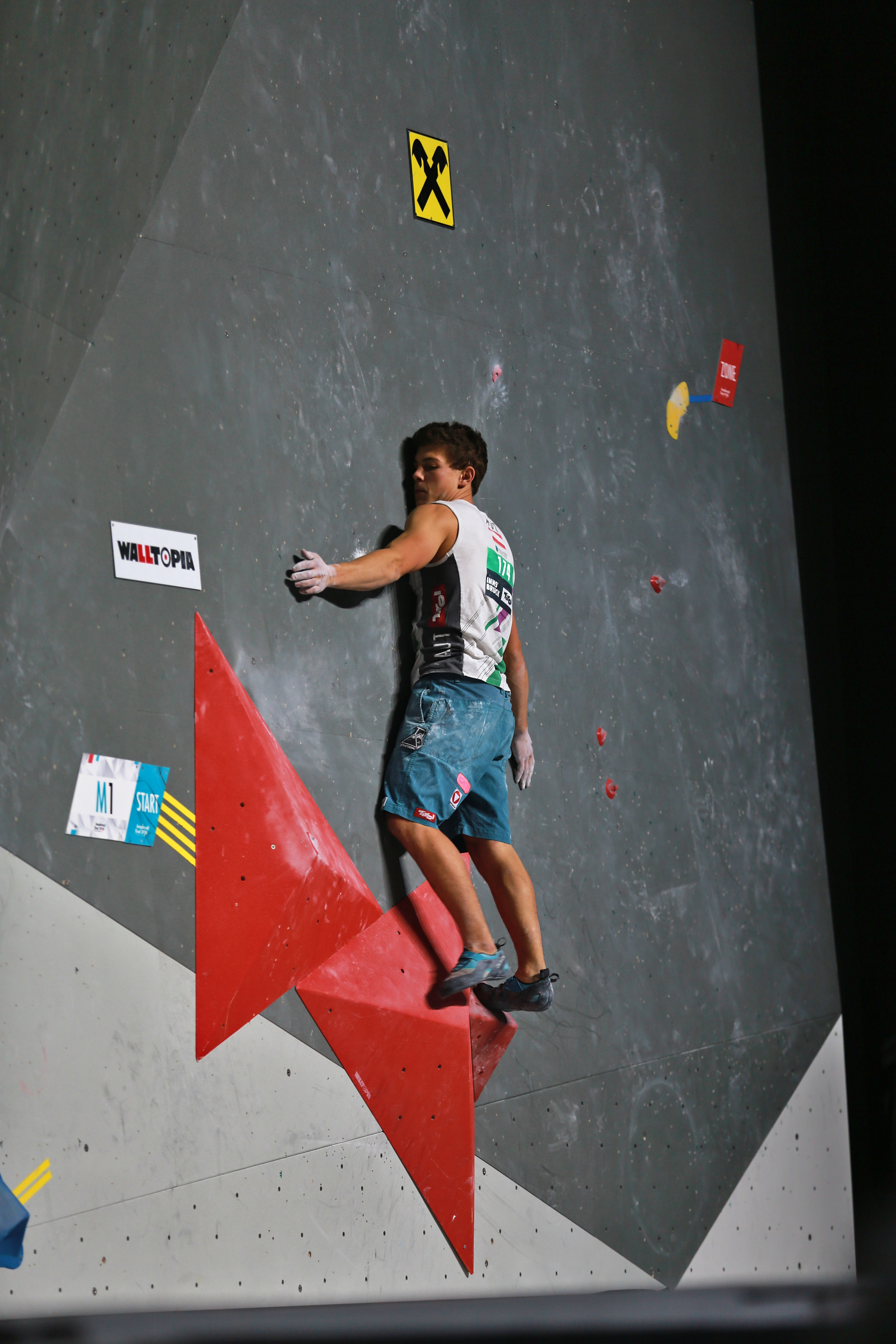
Smearing on indoor walls

'Smearing' involves using the rubber grip of the climbing shoes to gain purchase on a featureless rock face with no edges or holds to step on. The advent of specialist rubber-soled climbing shoes dramatically increased the surfaces that climbers could "smear" on. While the technique is used to some degree on almost every type of rock climbing route, it is most associated with 'slab climbing' where the ability to 'smear' is essential because of the smooth and featureless nature of the surface.

One of the most notable exponents of the 'smearing' technique is Welsh climber Johnny Dawes who used smearing it to create some of the hardest traditional slab climbs in the world such as the Indian Face and The Quarryman. Dawes is also noted for his unique "no-hands demonstrations" where he climbs extreme-graded rock climbing routes but uses only his feet and the smearing technique for upward momentum.

'Palming' is smearing with the open hands, and is used on smooth holds that cannot be gripped by the fingers, which are called 'slopers'. Palming is also often used when 'bridging' and 'chimneying' where the hands are pushing against the rock surfaces.

The extensive use of large volume holds (also sloper holds) by route setters in competition lead climbing and competition bouldering has also made 'smearing' and 'palming' an important technique for contemporary competition climbers (see photo).

=== Crimping, pinching and edging ===
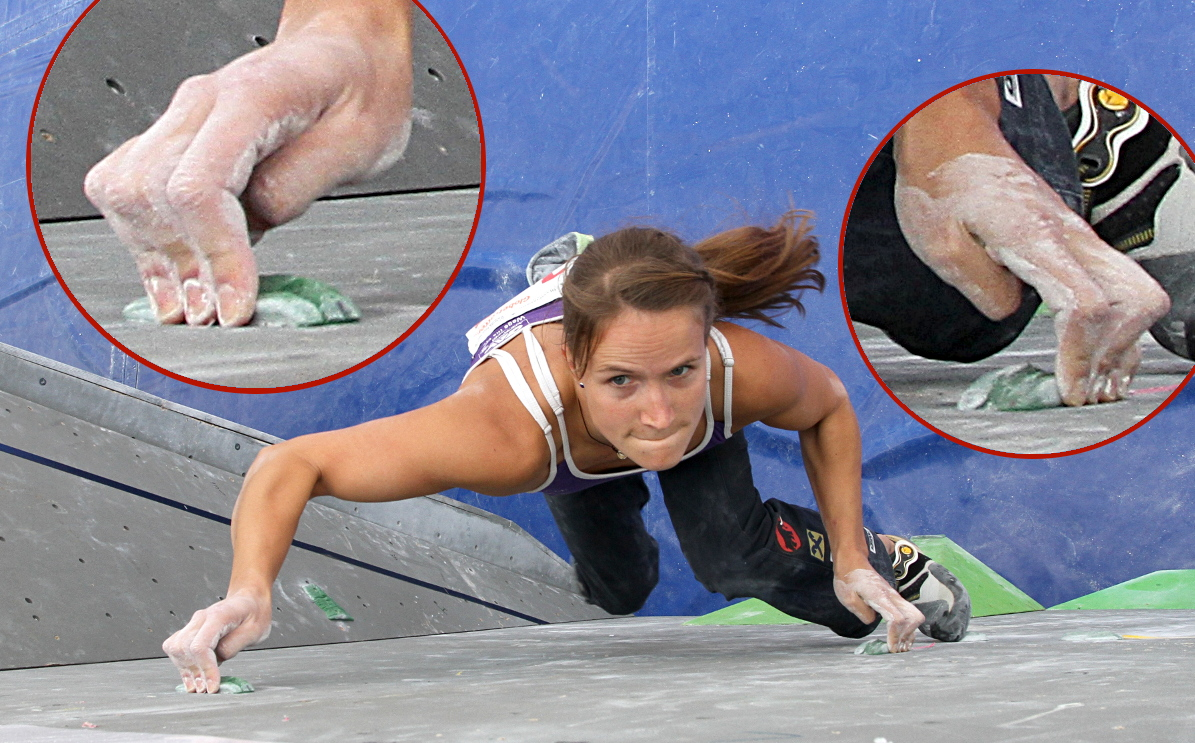
Crimping and edging

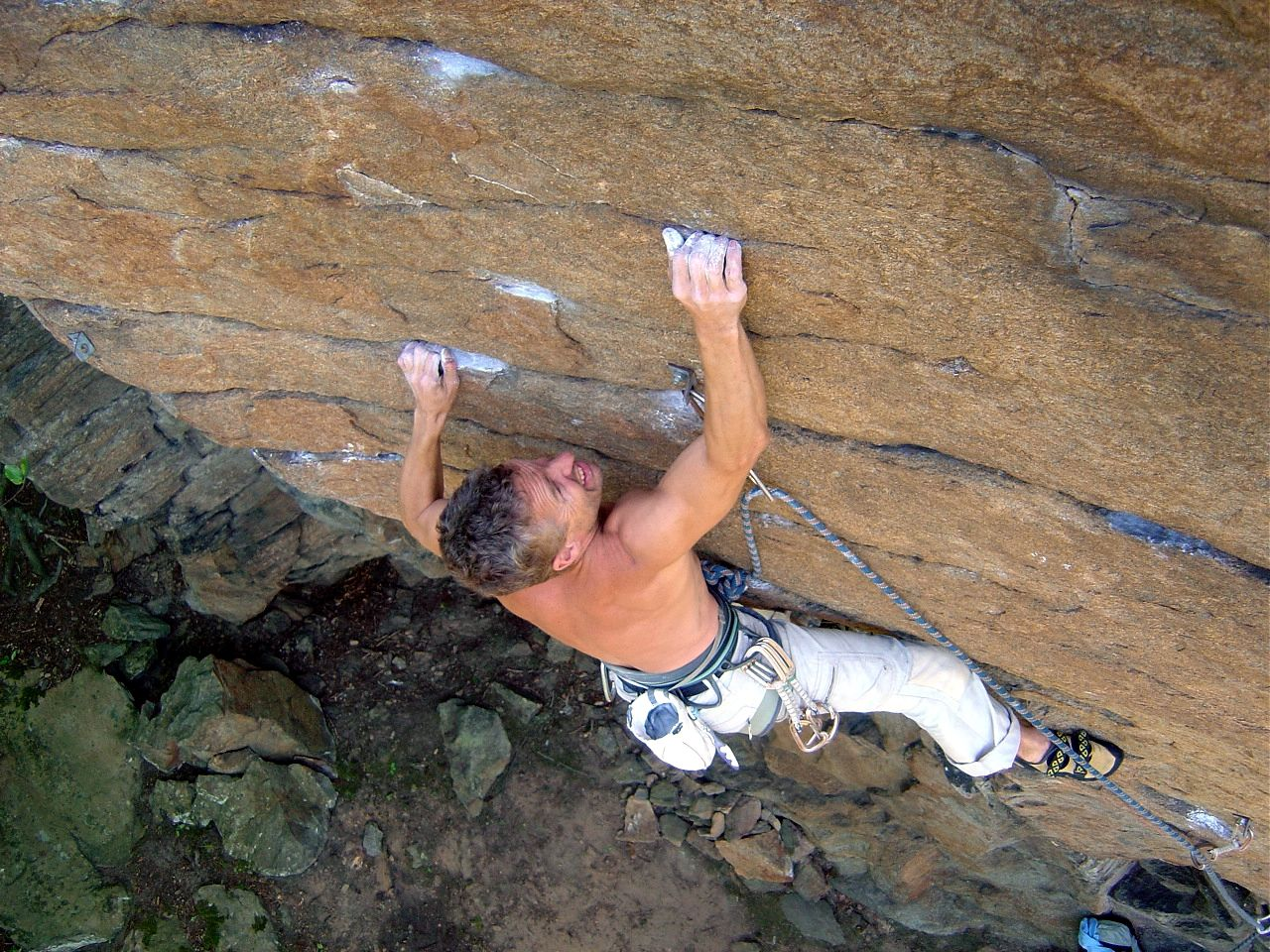
Crimping and edging

As climbers tried harder and harder routes, the holds became smaller and smaller, until they were barely large enough to accommodate the tips of fingers or the smallest part of a toe. 'Crimping' means holding the fingers in a tight line to hold onto the smallest holds, while 'edging' involves a similar process but with the "edges" of the climbing shoe. A related technique is that of 'pinching' which is used on even smaller holds. Crimping is associated with the development of training tools such as the hangboard that increase the tendon strength needed for crimping; however, it is also a source of tendon injury.

Crimping and edging are most associated with 'face climbing' where there are no big features on which to 'layback' or to 'bridge', and no cracks in which to 'jam'. They can also feature in traversing as was dramatically shown on the crux pitch of the famous Dawn Wall route in the film, The Dawn Wall. Many of the hardest modern routes feature painful micro-crimps from which the climber must launch a small "dyno" (i.e. a jump or lunge) to reach the next micro-crimps. Notable examples include the crux of the sport climbing route, La Dura Dura, and the crux of the bouldering problem, Burden of Dreams.

=== Hooking ===
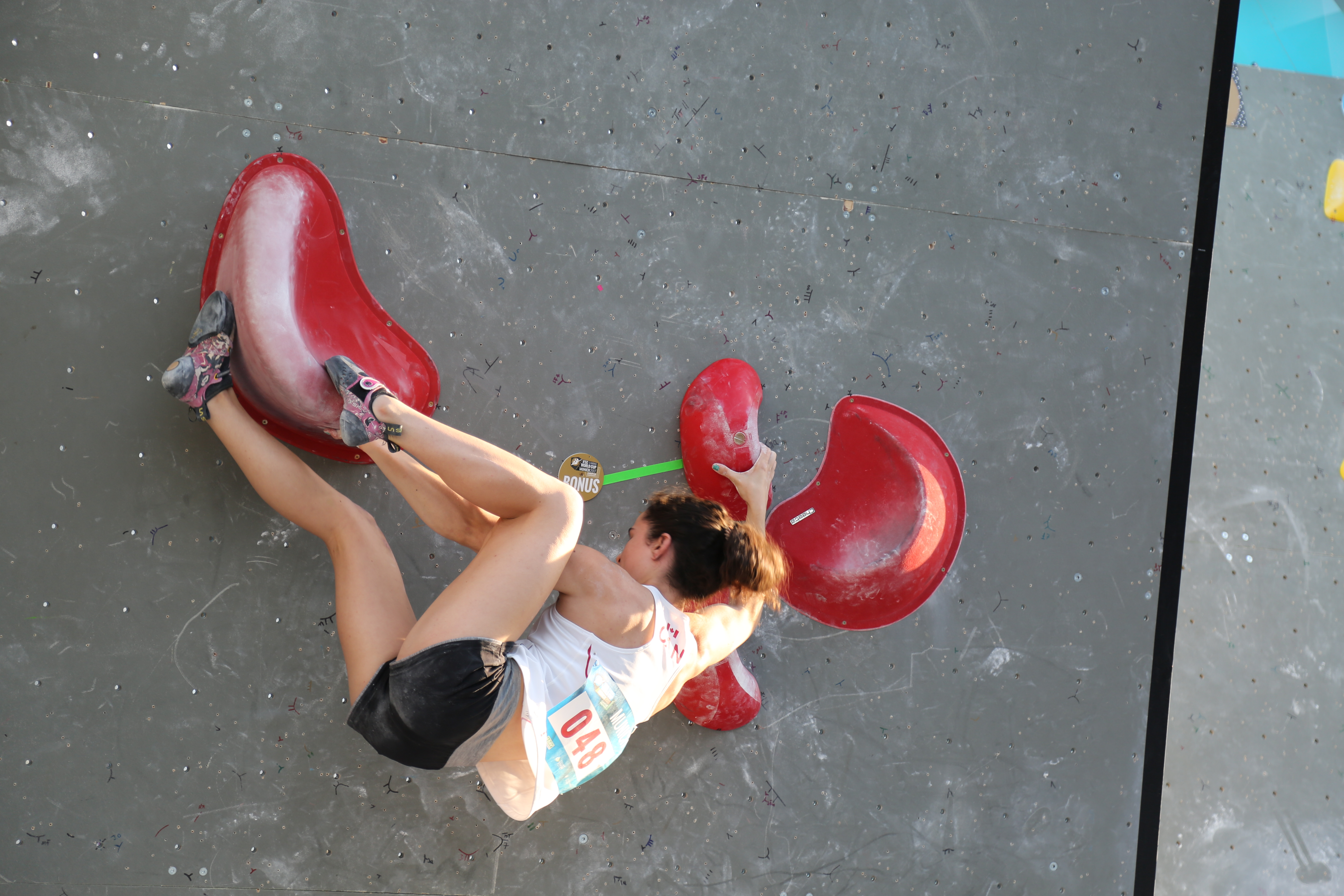
Toe hooking

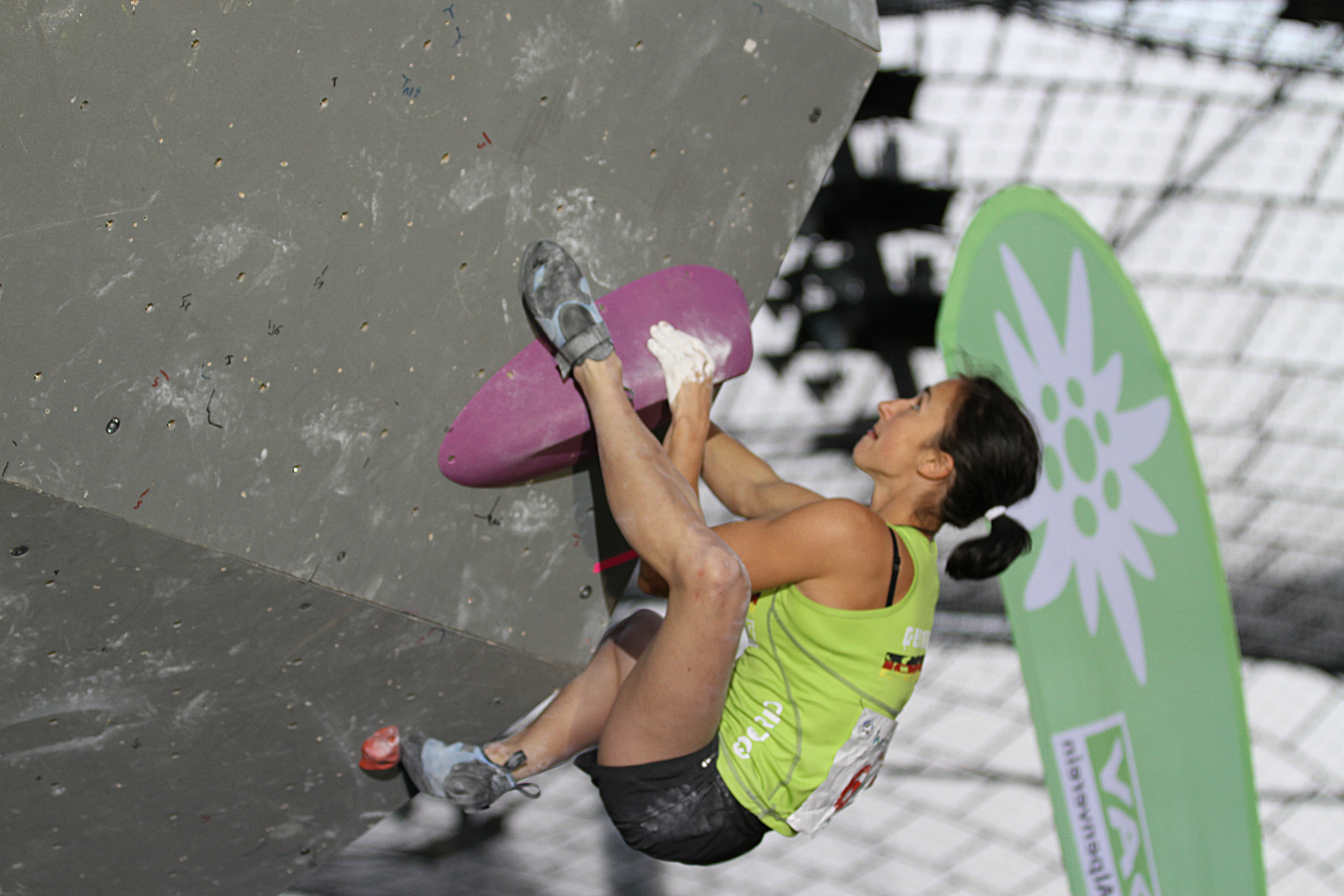
Heel hooking

'Hooking' involves using the legs and feet to grab — or "hook" — onto features on the rock. While hooking is a long-standing technique in rock climbing, competition climbers need to be able to master every type of hook including "toe hooks", "heel hooks" and "leg hooks" when trying to overcome the challenges of route setters, who have developed particular challenges on artificial climbing walls that can only be overcome with a precise hooking technique. Hooking is also used in competition climbing to gain a stable resting position, allowing the lactic acid to be shaken from the arms before carrying on.

The 'heel-toe cam' is where a 'heel hook' and a 'toe hook' are used simultaneously to act like a 'jamming' technique (i.e. they keep each other in place by their opposing force), and is a regular requirement in competition lead climbing.

=== Other advanced ===
The development of modern climbing routes which are typically severely overhanging (or with roofs), and which are now almost the standard in the main competition lead climbing events, has led to greater emphasis and refinement of many more advanced techniques, notable of which are:

Drop knee

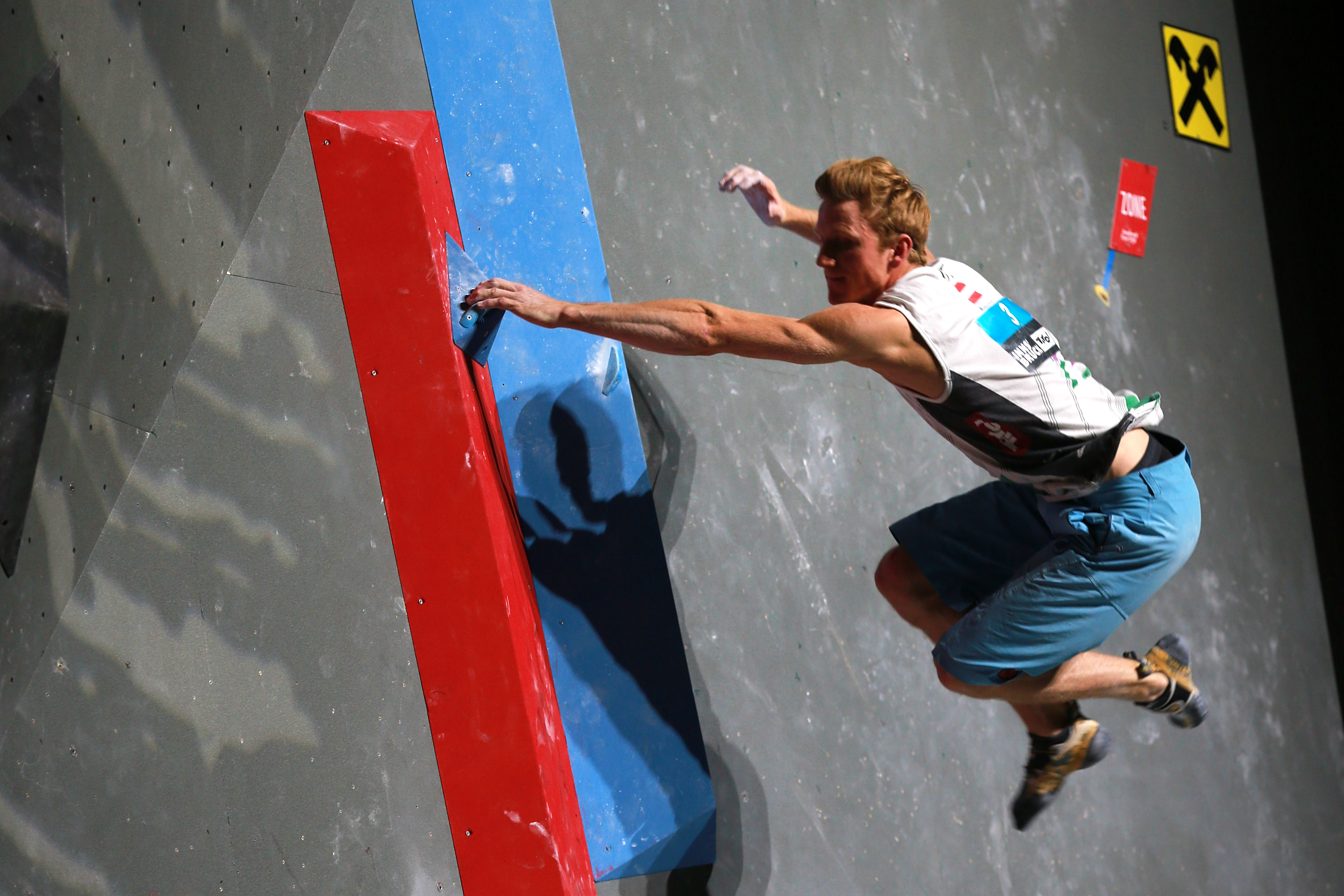
Dyno

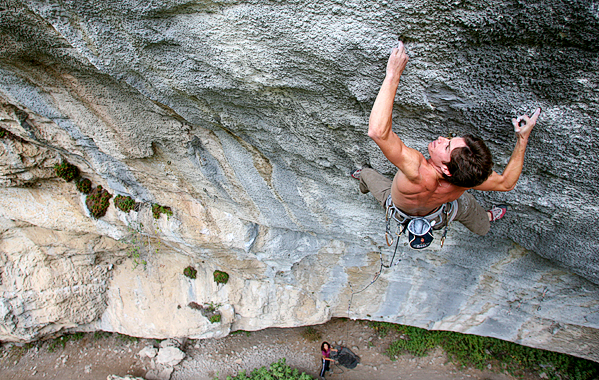
Finger pockets

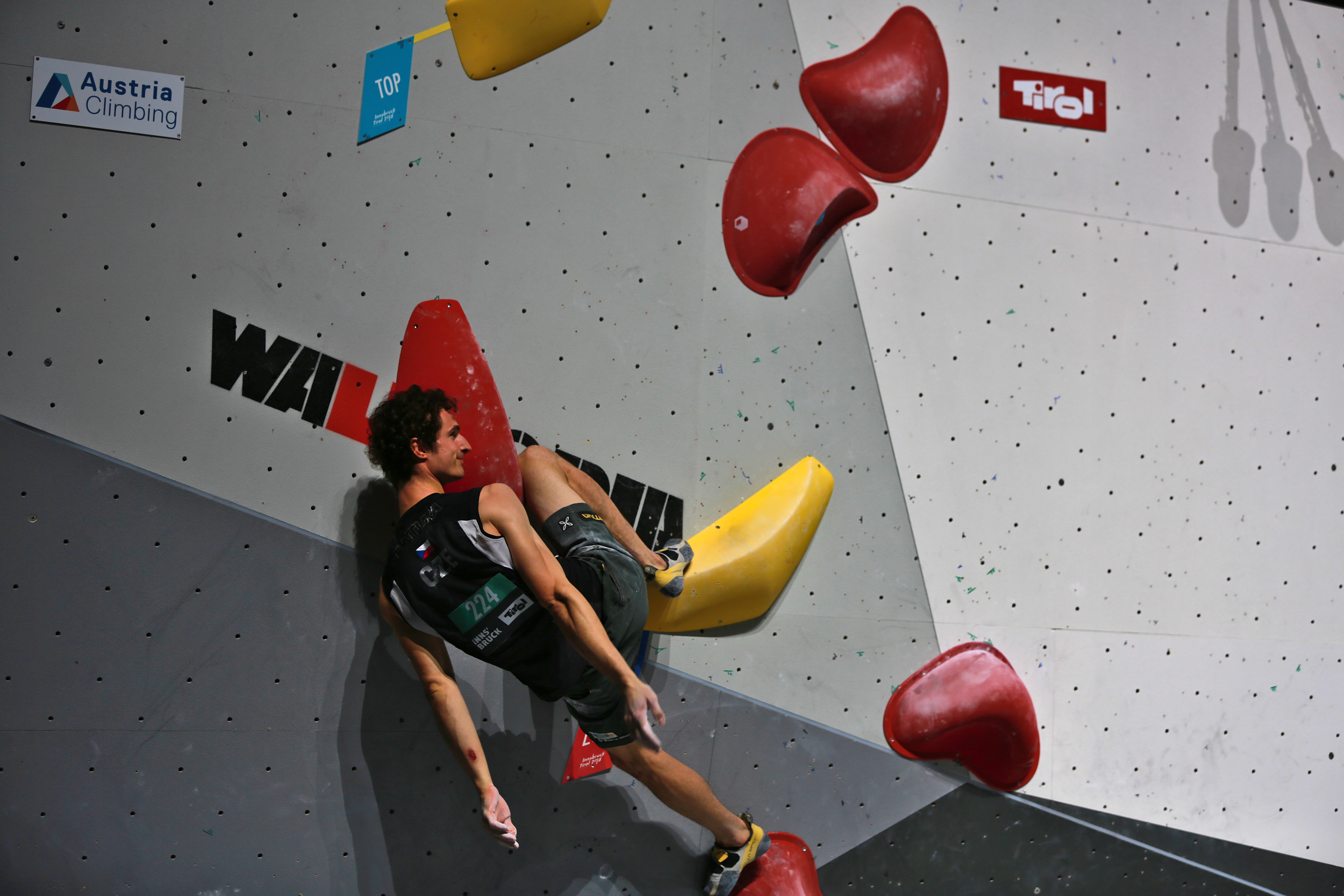
Knee bar

- Drop knee (or the 'Egyptian'), allows the climber to stay close to the surface of an overhanging route which in turn allows them to reach higher; the drop knee can put significant stresses on the knee joints from odd angles and can lead to injuries.
- Dynamic moves (or 'Dynos'), are where the climber 'jumps' through a sequence of holds, some of which can only hold the climber for an instant (a 'paddle dyno'), to make the next hold. Dynos are a major feature of competition bouldering.
- One/two-finger pockets (also called Huecos or mono-holds) are typically found on the detailed surface of limestone routes, one of the most famous being the 'dyno' to a small two-finger pocket on the historic sport climbing route, Action Directe.
- Knee-bars created a revolution in climbing as they enabled climbers to gain crucial rests for their arms during the climb; its use with artificial knee pads was initially controversial due to concerns of aid but is now generally accepted.
- Side-pulls and underclings, are where the climber pulls inward against a vertical crack or edge for the side-pull, or against a downward-facing horizontal crack or edge for the undercling; a key aspect of the technique is that while the hands are pulling the climber in, the feet are pushing the climber out, in the manner of 'laybacking'.
- Gaston (after its creator, Gaston Rébuffat), is an opposite version of a side-pull where the climber is pushing horizontally against the vertical crack or edge, in a similar action to a person prizing open an elevator door; it can place unusual strains on the shoulders which can cause injury.

== Grading ==
Climbing routes in rock climbing are given a grade that reflects the technical difficulty—and in some cases the risks and commitment level—of the route. The first ascensionist can suggest a grade, but it will be amended to reflect the consensus view of subsequent ascents, and recorded in online databased or physical guidebooks. While many countries with a strong tradition of climbing developed their own grading systems, a small number of grading systems have become internationally dominant for each type of climbing, which has contributed to the standardization of grades worldwide.

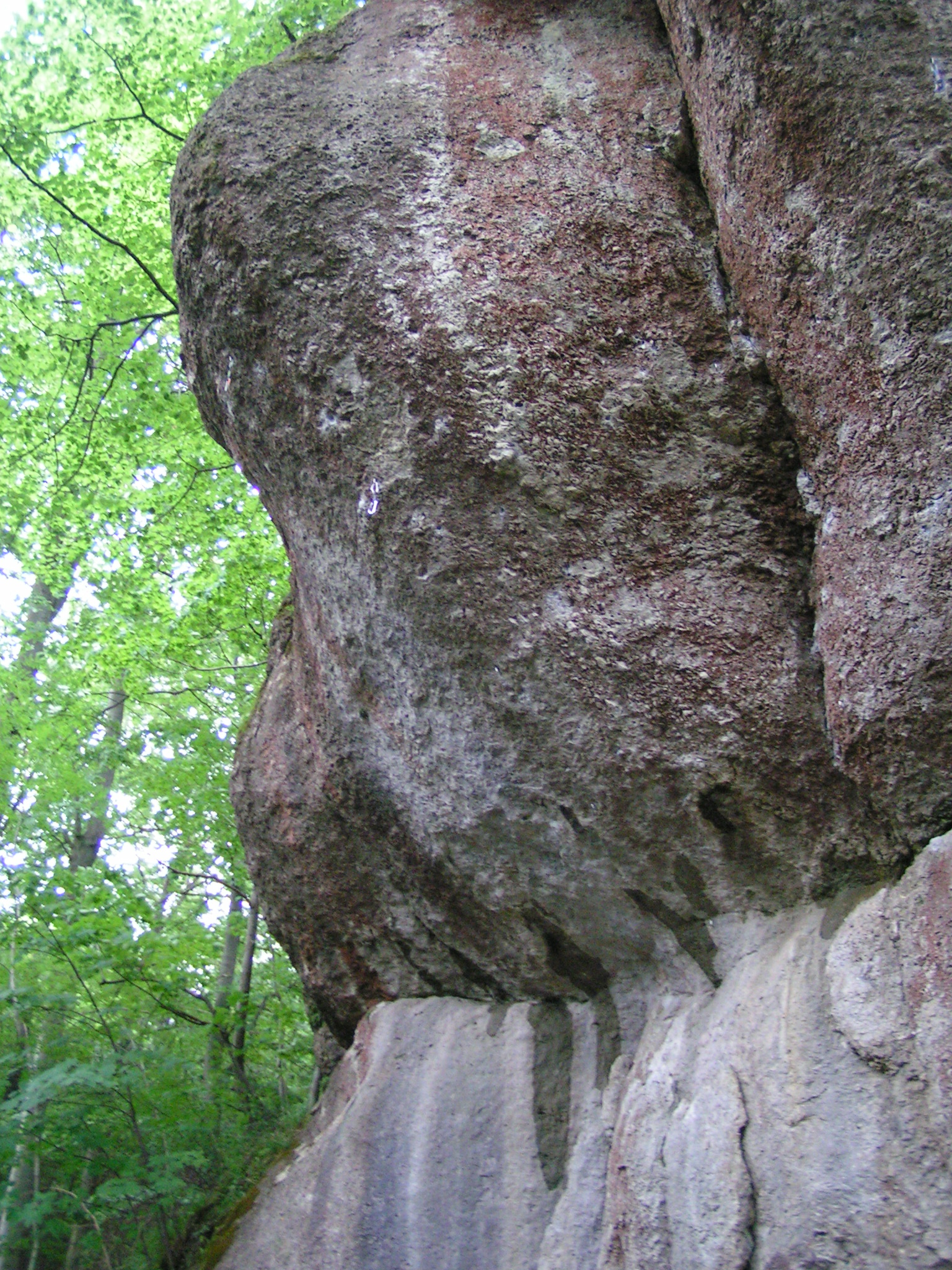
Action Directe was the first ever free climb at the grades of 9a (French), 5.14d (American YDS), XI (UIAA).

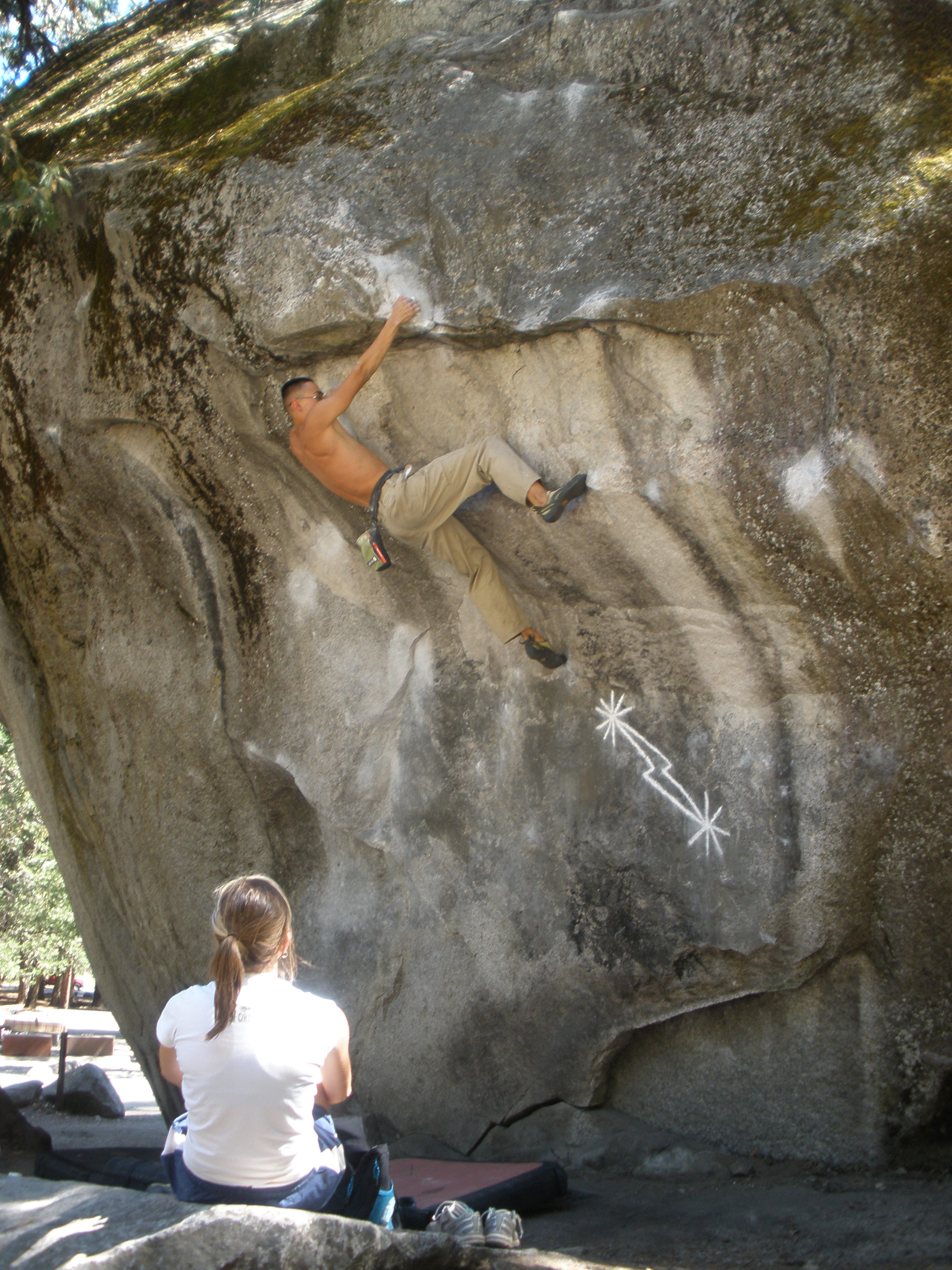
Midnight Lightning is one of the most famous boulders in history and the second-ever at the grades of V8 (7B/7B+).

For free climbing — in both traditional and sport climbing formats — the most dominant worldwide grading systems are the French system (e.g. ... 6b, 6c, 7a, 7b, 7c, ...), and the American system (e.g. ... 5.9, 5.10a, 5.10b, 5.10c, 5.10d, 5.11a, ...). The UIAA system (e.g. ... VII, VIII, IX, X, ...) is popular in Germany and central Europe. Above the lowest grades, these three systems can be exactly aligned at each level. For example, Silence is graded 9c (French), 5.15d (American), and XII+ (UIAA).

For bouldering, the most dominant worldwide grading systems are the French Font system (e.g. ... 6B, 6C, 7A, 7B, 7C, ...), and the American V-grade system (e.g. ... V5, V6, V7, V8, V9, ...). Above the lowest bouldering grades, the two systems can be exactly aligned at each level, and are often both quoted. For example, Dreamtime is graded 8C (on the Font-grade) and V15 (on the V-grade).

It is common, particularly at higher grades, for free climbers to describe the hardest (or crux) moves in terms of their bouldering grades. In 2017, Adam Ondra described the crux of Silence in the following terms: "Then comes the crux boulder problem, 10 moves of 8C [French boulder]. And when I say 8C boulder problem, I really mean it. ... I reckon just linking 8C [French boulder] into 8B [French boulder] into 7C [French boulder] is a 9b+ [French] sport climb, I'm pretty sure about that".

Following on from this trend, comparison tables have been produced to align bouldering grades with their equivalent technical free climbing grades, where for example, free climbing grades of 5.13d (8b) are generally equated with the bouldering grades of V10 (7C+).

=== Evolution of grade milestones ===
The history of rock climbing is tied to the evolution of grade milestones which have constantly risen due to ever-improving techniques and equipment. Grade milestones are chronicled for each type of rock climbing, and split by gender. In contrast to its origins, the gender gap at the hardest difficulty grades has almost completely closed in modern rock climbing, with highest female grade milestones at only one or two levels below the highest male grade milestones in most rock climbing disciplines (e.g., as at September 2026, hardest-ever difficulty grade ascended by men is at 9c (5.15d), and for women is just one level lower at 9b+ (5.15c)), a situation that some scientists have attributed to an evolutionary origin.

As of September 2026, the following milestones are recognised (only the first person(s) to achieve the milestone is shown):

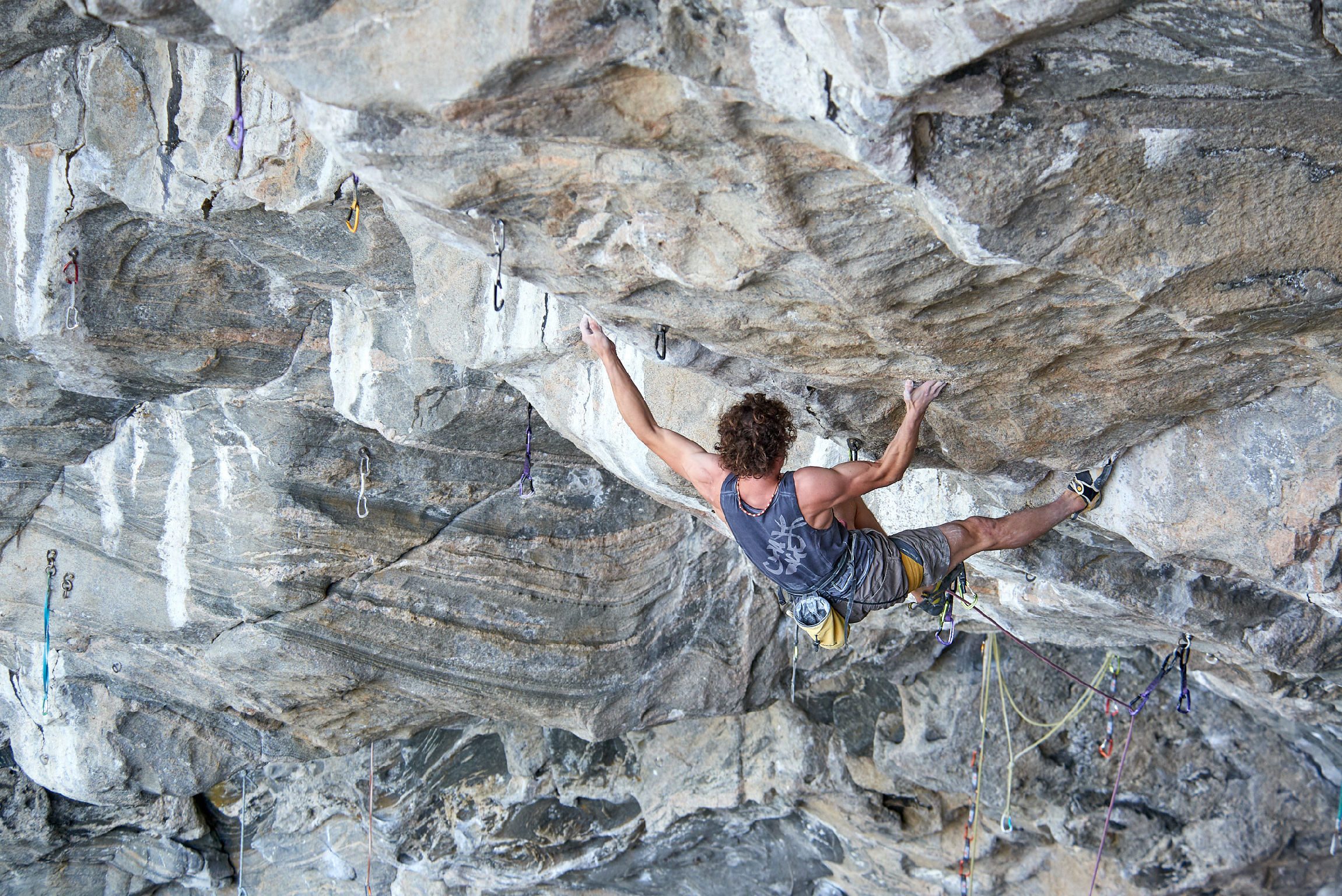
Silence is 9c (French), 5.15d (American YDS), and XII+ (UIAA)

- For single-pitch climbing:
  - Hardest lead sport climbing redpoint:
    - For men: 9c (5.15d), the first being Adam Ondra in 2017 on Silence.
    - For women: 9b+ (5.15c), the first being Brooke Raboutou in 2025 on Excalibur.
  - Hardest lead sport climbing onsight/flash:
    - For men: 9a+ (5.15a), the first and only being Adam Ondra in 2018 on SuperCrackinette (flash).
    - For women: 8c+ (5.14c), the first being Laura Rogora in 2025 on Ultimate Sacrifice (onsight).
  - Hardest lead traditional climbing redpoint:
    - For men: 9a (5.14d), the first being Jacopo Larcher in 2019 on Tribe.
    - For women: 8c+ (5.14c), the first being Beth Rodden in 2008 on Meltdown.
  - Hardest free solo:
    - For men: 8c (5.14b), the first and only being Alfredo Webber in 2021 on Panem et Circenses.
    - For women: 7a (5.11d), the first being Steph Davis in 1999 on Coyne Crack.
- For multi-pitch (and big wall) climbing:
  - Hardest lead sport climbing redpoint:
    - For men: 9a (5.14d), the first being Tommy Caldwell and Kevin Jorgeson in 2015 on The Dawn Wall.
    - For women: 8c (5.14b), the first being Sasha DiGiulian, Brette Harrington, and Matilda Söderlund in 2022 on Rayu.
  - Hardest free solo:
    - For men: 7c+ (5.13a), the first and only being Alex Honnold in 2017 on Freerider.
    - For women: 7a (5.11d), the first and only being Aleksandra Taistra in 2026 on Alfredo Alfredo.
- For bouldering:
  - For men: 9A (V17), the first being Nalle Hukkataival in 2016 on Burden of Dreams.
  - For women: 8C+ (V16), the first and only being Katie Lamb in 2025 on The Dark Side.

== History and development ==
=== Origins and rise of free climbing ===
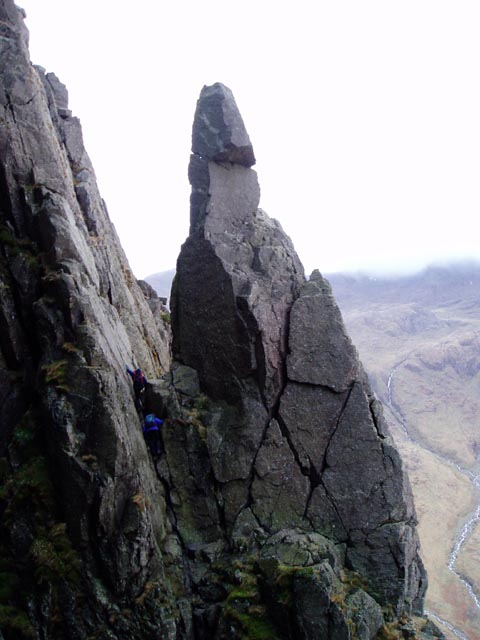
Napes Needle, on the Great Gable in the Lake District in England, was first climbed by W. P. Haskett Smith in 1886; an act that is considered to be the start of the modern sport of rock climbing.

In the history of rock climbing, the three main sub-disciplines — bouldering, single-pitch climbing, and big wall climbing — trace their origins to late 19th-century Europe. Bouldering started in Fontainebleau, and was pioneered by Pierre Allain in the 1930s, and John Gill in the 1950s. Big wall climbing started in the Dolomites, and spread across the Alps in the 1930s led by Emilio Comici and Riccardo Cassin, and in the 1950s by Walter Bonatti, before reaching Yosemite where it was led in the 1950s to 1970s by Royal Robbins. Single-pitch climbing started pre-1900 in both the Lake District and in Saxony, and by the 1970s had spread globally led by climbers such as Ron Fawcett (Britain), Bernd Arnold (Germany), Patrick Berhault (France), Ron Kauk and John Bachar (USA).

As it uses no artificial aid or climbing protection, bouldering has remained consistent since its origins. Single-pitch climbing stopped using artificial aid in the early 20th century, led by Paul Preuss, and later by Kurt Albert, in so-called "free climbing", however, it would not be until the late 1960s and early 1970s that Robbins and Yvon Chouinard would bring free-climbing to big-walls. Mechanical devices that provided climbing protection only (i.e. they provided no aid in ascending), were needed for single-pitch and big-wall free climbing, and they were inserted into the route while the climber was ascending, which came to be called "traditional climbing".

=== Impact of sport climbing ===
During the late 1970s and early 1980s, French pioneers like Patrick Edlinger wanted to climb rock faces in Buoux and Verdon that had no cracks in which to insert traditional climbing protection. They pre-drilled bolts into routes as climbing protection (but not as artificial aid to help upward momentum), which became known as "sport climbing". The safer format of sport climbing led to a dramatic increase in climbing standards, technical grades, and training tools (e.g. artificial climbing walls and campus boards), the development of competition climbing (initially dominated in the 1990s by French climbers such as François Legrand), and the arrival of the "professional" rock climber.

By the end of the 20th century, the hardest sport climbs were often combinations of 'bouldering moves', and some of the best challenges lay in free climbing extreme big walls; this led to greater cross-over amongst the three sub-disciplines. Pioneers such as Wolfgang Güllich, Jerry Moffatt, Alexander Huber, Fred Nicole, Chris Sharma, Adam Ondra, and Tommy Caldwell set records in several of these disciplines. Güllich and Huber made ever-bolder single-pitch free solo climbs, while Sharma pushed standards in deep-water soloing; Alex Honnold's big wall free soloing became the Oscar-winning film, Free Solo. In 2016, the IOC announced competition climbing would be a medal event in the 2020 Summer Olympics.

=== Women in rock climbing ===
Female rock climbing developed later in the 20th century but by the 1980s, climbers such as Lynn Hill and Catherine Destivelle were closing the gap to the technical grades that the leading men were climbing. In 1993, Hill made the first free ascent of The Nose on El Capitan, one of the most sought-after big wall climbing prizes that had resisted all prior attempts. By the 21st century, Josune Bereziartu, Angela Eiter and Ashima Shiraishi, had closed the gap to the highest sport and boulder climbing grades achieved by men to within one-two notches; Beth Rodden fully closed the gap for traditional climbing grades by freeing Meltdown, and Janja Garnbret became the most successful competition climber in history.

=== Global expansion of rock climbing ===
While the sport of rock climbing largely began in Europe in the 19th century and expanded to North America in the 20th century, the development of indoor climbing (and its accessible format of bouldering), and the rise of competition-climbing (and its arrival as an olympic sport), has seen a dramatic further world-wide expansion of the sport in the 21st century, with Asia becoming the fastest-growing region. Japanese, South Korean and Chinese competition climbers are regular medalists at the World Climbing Series and the World Climbing Championships events, and in 2025, Asian competition climbers made a clean sweep of the medals at the 2025 World Climbing Championships in the men's lead-climbing discipline, and finished 2nd (China), 3rd (Japan) and 4th (South Korea) in the overall medals table across all disciplines.

== Ethics ==
There have been many debates in rock climbing on "ethical issues", particularly around what is fair sporting conduct (e.g. the use of aid or "fair means" climbing, the use of bolts in sport climbing, and the use of "chipping" to manufacture holds), and what is appropriate for the protection of the environment (e.g. the switch to clean aid "hammerless" climbing and the greater awareness of the adverse effect of climbing on the environment).

=== Use of aid for progression ("fair means") ===
One of the earliest ethical debates in rock climbing was around the transition from aid climbing to free climbing. In 1911, Austrian climber Paul Preuss started what became known as the Mauerhakenstreit (or "piton dispute"), by advocating for a transition to "free climbing" via a series of essays and articles in the German Alpine Journal where he defined "artificial aid" and proposed 6 rules of free climbing including the important rule 4: "The piton is an emergency aid and not the basis of a system of mountaineering". In 1913, German climber Rudolf Fehrmann published the second edition of Der Bergsteiger in der Sächsischen Schweiz (or The Climber in Saxon Switzerland), which included the first binding rules for climbing in the area to protect the soft sandstone rock. The rules said that only natural holds were allowed, and these "rules for free climbing" are still followed today.

=== Clean aid climbing ("hammerless climbing") ===
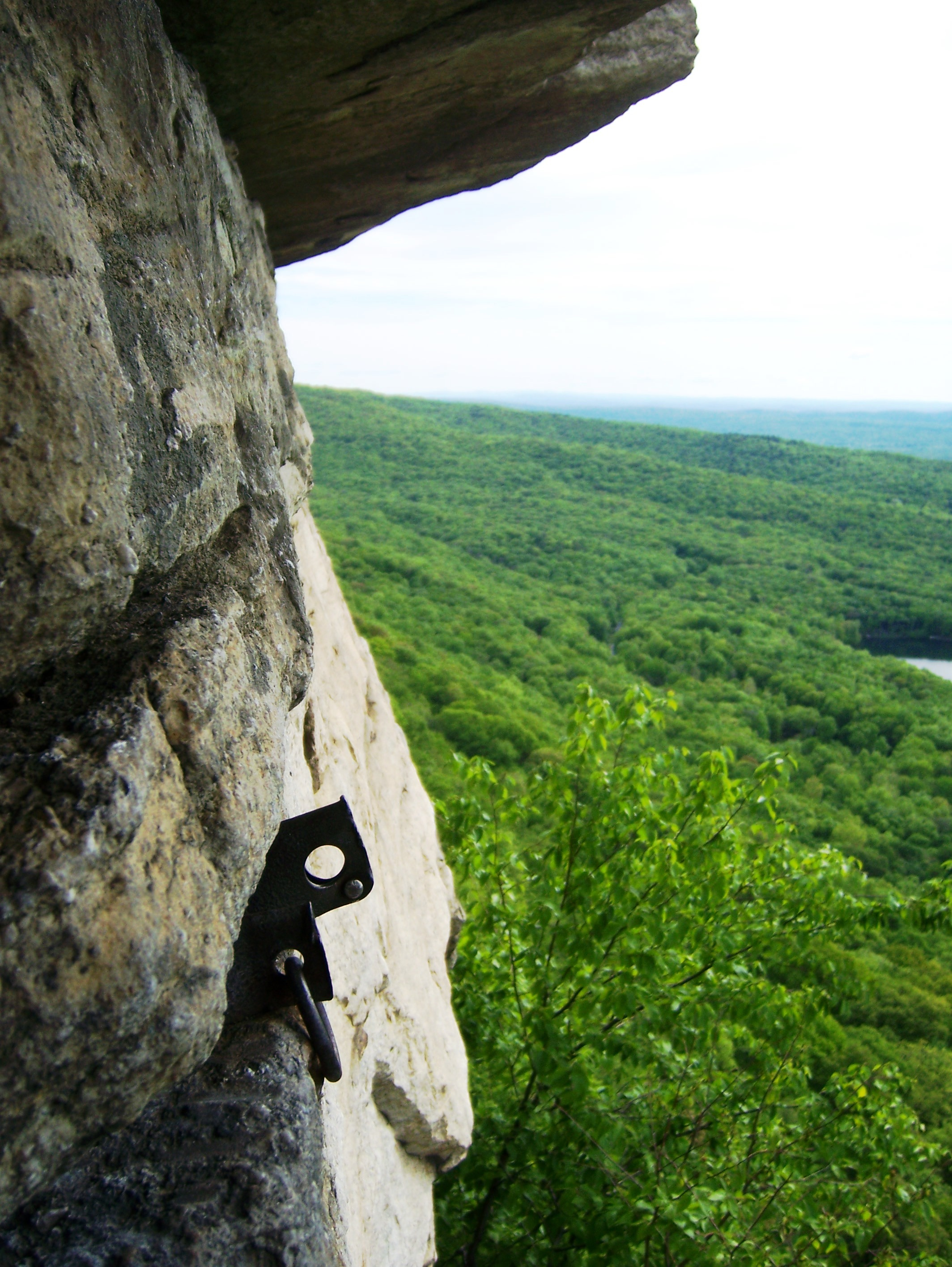
Hammered in piton

The arrival of steel pitons after World War 2, ushered in a golden age of big wall aid climbing on the granite cracks of Yosemite (the cracks were then too difficult to be free-climbed). In 1958, a team led by Warren Harding made the coveted first ascent of The Nose on El Capitan hammering in 600 pitons and 125 bolts into the route over 47 days; while the ascent got worldwide recognition it was controversial due to the excessive use of aid. A famous 1972 essay by big wall pioneers Yvon Chouinard and Tom Frost called for an end to hammer (and piton) intensive aid climbing and a switch to hammerless "clean climbing", which was later adopted.

=== Use of bolts for protection ("sport climbing") ===
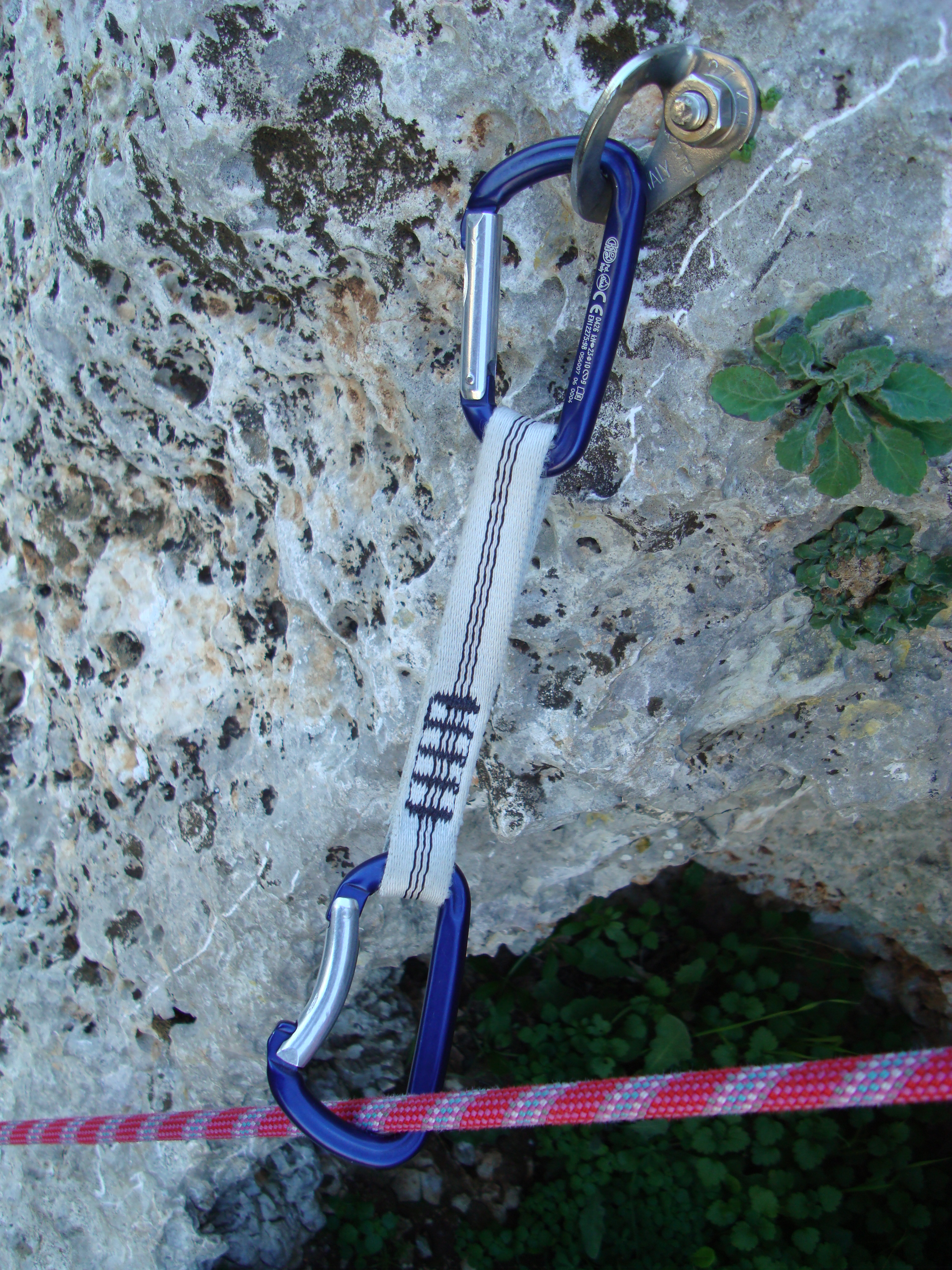
Bolt and quickdraw

Since the introduction of bolted sport-climbing in the 1980s, there has been a debate in the climbing world on their use in providing protection (sport climbing bolts do not provide any aid in upward momentum), as they can alter the challenge and risk of a climbing route. A famous essay from 1971 by Italian mountaineer Reinhold Messner called The Murder of the Impossible (which was believed to have been inspired by the 400-bolt Compressor Route), challenged that the use of bolted protection was diminishing the nature of mountaineering, saying of such climbers: "he carries his courage in his rucksack, in the form of bolts and equipment".

During the 1980s and 1990s in the US, this debate became so heated that it was known as the "bolt wars", with climbers bolt chopping (i.e. removing in-situ protection) on routes they considered to be traditional-only routes (i.e. no in-situ protection). Bolt chopping still goes on today, however, many climbing areas, with the assistance and support of regulatory bodies, have introduced formal policies regarding bolt use.

The debate also extends to the issue of retro-bolting traditional-climbing routes by installing fixed bolts to make them into safer sport-climbing routes, but which then alters the challenge of the route. Some traditional climbers began to "greenpoint" established sport climbing routes by chopping their in-situ bolts and re-climbing using traditional protection. Notable examples include Sonnie Trotter's "greenpoint" of The Path at Lake Louise.

=== Manufacturing of holds on routes ("chipping") ===
Some climbers have physically altered the rock surface to "construct" a route (or make a route more climbable), by cutting or expanding handholds, which is known as chipping. Such acts have at times caused controversy (e.g. Fred Rouhling's Akira and Hugh), but at other times has not (e.g. famous routes such as Antoine Le Menestrel's La Rose et la Vampire, Jean-Baptiste Tribout's Superplafond, and Ray Jardine's The Phoenix). The free climb of one of the most famous big-wall routes in history, The Nose on El Capitan, relies on a "manufactured" traverse that was chipped out of the granite rock by Ray Jardine (and is called "Jardine's Traverse"). A 2022 survey by Climbing showed climbers were largely against manufacturing routes on natural outdoor rock on public lands, but were less negative on private lands (or on routes in quarries); they were willing to allow "cleaning" of routes (which some consider manufacturing), and also the repairing of routes (e.g. gluing back broken holds).

=== Effect of climbing on the environment ===
The popularity of outdoor rock climbing has led to several debates on its environmental impact. The use of climber's chalk has raised concerns as a result of the environmental impact of its mining process, as well as its potential toxicity and unsightly bright white colour in the natural environment. Rock climbing has been restricted and even prohibited in areas due to concerns about its impact on sensitive breeding wildlife grounds and delicate fauna, and incidences of damage or vandalism to the physical rock and cultural sites. A notable example is in Hueco Tanks, one of the most important bouldering locations in the world (and where the V-grading system was invented), where climbing is controlled and limited by park rangers to avoid damage to important cultural sites.

=== Evolving equipment and technology ===
Climber using knee pads to execute a knee-bar on a boulder.

Many developments in rock-climbing equipment, such as the introduction of advanced rubber-soled shoes, or the use of climbing chalk, were met with concerns that they gave unfair aid to the climber. The use of knee pads, which enable the climber to use the 'knee-bar' technique to take rests on the climb, is still an area of debate in climbing. In some cases, the use of such 'knee-bars' (facilitated by knee pads) has reduced the technical grade or difficulty of a route (e.g. Hubble in Britain). In 2021, Czech climber Adam Ondra wrote that knee pads are no different to the introduction of rubber shoes or climbing chalk and that the changes in the grade are unfortunate from a historical perspective but they are inevitable.

== Culture ==
At a general level, commentators note the development of contemporary rock climbing culture from its roots in the counterculture movement of the 1960s and 1970s, an era typified by the drop-out "dirtbag climber" living simply and cheaply out of their car and tent to devote themselves to rock climbing in nature. Rock climbing was a counterculture way of life with an ethos of purity and an aesthetic with nature, and was typified in the United States by the community that was gathered in Camp 4 in Yosemite in California.

In the 1980s and 1990s, Europeans, followed by Americans, began to increase the level of physical training and techniques (e.g., hangdogging and plyometrics), to enable them ascend a new generation of technically harder sport climbing routes. Sport climbing led to competition climbing which further pushed the culture of rock climbing to that of a competitive sport. The popularity of bouldering drove the rapid growth worldwide in indoor climbing gyms where the risks to the climber were almost eliminated, and the focus was purely on the technical sporting challenge of the movements.

Some commentators, such as Cedar Wright, lament the passing of the "dirtbag climber" era, and emblematic figures such as Yvon Chouinard who gave away his entire Patagonia Inc. fortune to charity. In 2020, Climbing magazine noted that some elements of rock climbing culture still remained unchanged, quoting editor Michael Kennedy from 1975 who wrote "[Rock] Climbing is about two things: ascending direct natural lines with a minimum of technical aid and protection; and preserving the climbs through the use of the least destructive methods possible." and adding "In a world where some 44.5 million people now climb both indoors and outside, with 1,000 to 1,500 people taking up the sport daily, [...] , Kennedy's words ring truer than ever".

== Health ==
=== Positive aspects ===
Rock climbing has been associated with various health benefits, including improvements in cardiorespiratory fitness, muscle strength, and balance. Research has also reported potential mental health benefits, such as enhanced memory and problem-solving, reduced symptoms of depression, improved communication and social integration skills, and increased self-confidence.

The awareness of mental health benefits from rock climbing has led to the emergence of "therapeutic climbing" (TC), particularly indoor bouldering because of its relative ease and safety for beginners. A 2023 review in the academic journal PM&R reported positive effects of TC in various patient groups and concluded that it is a safe and effective approach for improving physical, mental, and social well-being. Some additional studies have suggested that TC may even be comparable in effectiveness to cognitive behavioral therapy for treating depression. A 2025 systematic review reported that indoor bouldering combined with mindfulness exercises may be an effective, safe, and sustainable adjunctive intervention for adults with moderate depression, although superiority over other established treatments could not be demonstrated.

=== Adverse aspects ===
Aside from the obvious physical risks of a fall in rock climbing, climbers are known to experience tendon (particularly on the fingers and arms), and joint (particularly on the knees and shoulders) injuries. This frequency and severity of these injuries have been amplified by the use of advanced plyometric training devices such as the campus board, and by climbing techniques such as the "drop-knee".

Climbers have spoken about the prevalence of eating disorders, particularly in competition climbing as athletes seek to optimise their strength-to-weight ratio. In 2023, one of the most high-profile competition climbers, Janja Garnbret, called it a long-standing "cultural problem". In 2024, the IFSC introduced its first explicit policy guidelines to try and combat the issue of eating disorders in competition climbing.

== Governance and organisation ==
Rock climbing is a largely self-governing sport principally relying on social sanctioning but where individual country-level associations can act as "representative bodies" for the sport some of which are formally recognised by the State (e.g. the American Alpine Club) and can have an influence on Government policy in areas that interest the sport such as land access. Many such country-level rock-climbing associations also represent the related sport of mountaineering, from which rock-climbing evolved during the 19th and 20th centuries (e.g. the British Mountaineering Council). The Union Internationale des Associations d'Alpinisme (UIAA) is an important international representative association for mountaineering that also represents rock climbing and ice climbing, particularly in the areas of equipment quality standards and competition climbing.

In the late 1980s, the UIAA began to more formally regulate and govern the emerging rock climbing discipline of competition climbing and formed the International Council for Competition Climbing (ICCC), which the UIAA later seceded to a new separate body called the International Federation of Sport Climbing (IFSC) to regulate competition climbing, including the Olympic sport of climbing (the UIAA still directly regulates competition ice climbing). In December 2025, the IFSC was rebranded to World Climbing (WC). The creation of the ICCC and WC also led to the creation of numerous country-level competition climbing associations, some of which are sub-organisations of longer-standing "representative bodies" (e.g. GB Climbing is a sub-group of the British Mountaineering Council), and some of which are completely independent (e.g. USA Climbing).

In addition to the above international and national representative bodies, specialist groups have been established to represent the interests of rock climbing in particular areas, a notable example being The Access Fund, a North American body whose focus is on securing and maintaining access to climbing areas and of promoting responsible and ethical behaviour within those areas.

== In film ==
Several notable films have been made that are focused on various types of rock climbing including:

=== Aid climbing ===
- Assault on El Capitan, a 2013 documentary film of Ammon McNeely's 2011 repeat of the controversial 1982 route, Wings of Steel, on El Capitan.
- The Inner Wall, a 2018 short documentary film from Reel Rock (Season 4, Episode 2) on Andy Kirkpatrick rope solo aid climbing on El Capitan.

=== Big wall climbing ===
- El Capitan, a 1978 documentary film about an early ascent of The Nose (VI 5.9 C2) on El Capitan.
- Valley Uprising, a 2014 Amazon Prime documentary film about rock climbing in Yosemite, that includes big wall climbing.
- The Dawn Wall, a 2017 Netflix documentary film about Tommy Caldwell and Kevin Jorgeson's ascent of the first-ever big wall route at 5.14d (9a).
- Free Solo, a 2018 Netflix documentary film about Alex Honnold's free solo climb of Freerider 5.13a (7c+) on El Capitan.
- The Alpinist, a 2021 documentary film about the late Canadian alpinist Marc-André Leclerc, featuring his solo ascent of Torre Egger in Patagonia.

=== Bouldering ===
- Rampage, a 1999 documentary of an 18-year old Chris Sharma on an American bouldering road trip that ushered in the "bouldering revolution".

=== Competition climbing ===
- The Wall: Climb for Gold, a 2022 film documentary on Janja Garnbret, Shauna Coxsey, Brooke Raboutou, and Miho Nonaka.

=== Single pitch climbing ===
- Dosage Volume I-V, the well-regarded 2001 to 2007 series includes notable first ascent grade milestones including Chris Sharma's historic first free ascent of Realization/Biographie 9a+ (5.15a), and Beth Rodden's historic first free ascent of Meltdown 8c+ (5.14c).
- Hard Grit, a 1998 documentary film about traditional climbing on extreme gritstone routes in the British Peak District.
- King Lines, a 2007 documentary film about Chris Sharma, featuring his free solo climb of the DWS route, Es Pontàs 9a+ (5.15a), in Mallorca.
- Reel Rock 7, the 2012 edition of the Reel Rock series with Chris Sharma and Adam Ondra's collaboration on La Dura Dura 9b+ (5.15c).
- Statement of Youth, a 2019 documentary film about the birth of sport climbing in Britain in the 1980s featuring Jerry Moffatt and Ben Moon.

== See also ==
=== General climbing ===
- Glossary of climbing terms
- List of climbers

=== Other major forms of climbing ===
- Ice climbing
- Mountaineering
