= Lokomotive =

Coordinates: 50.965974°N 14.084505°E

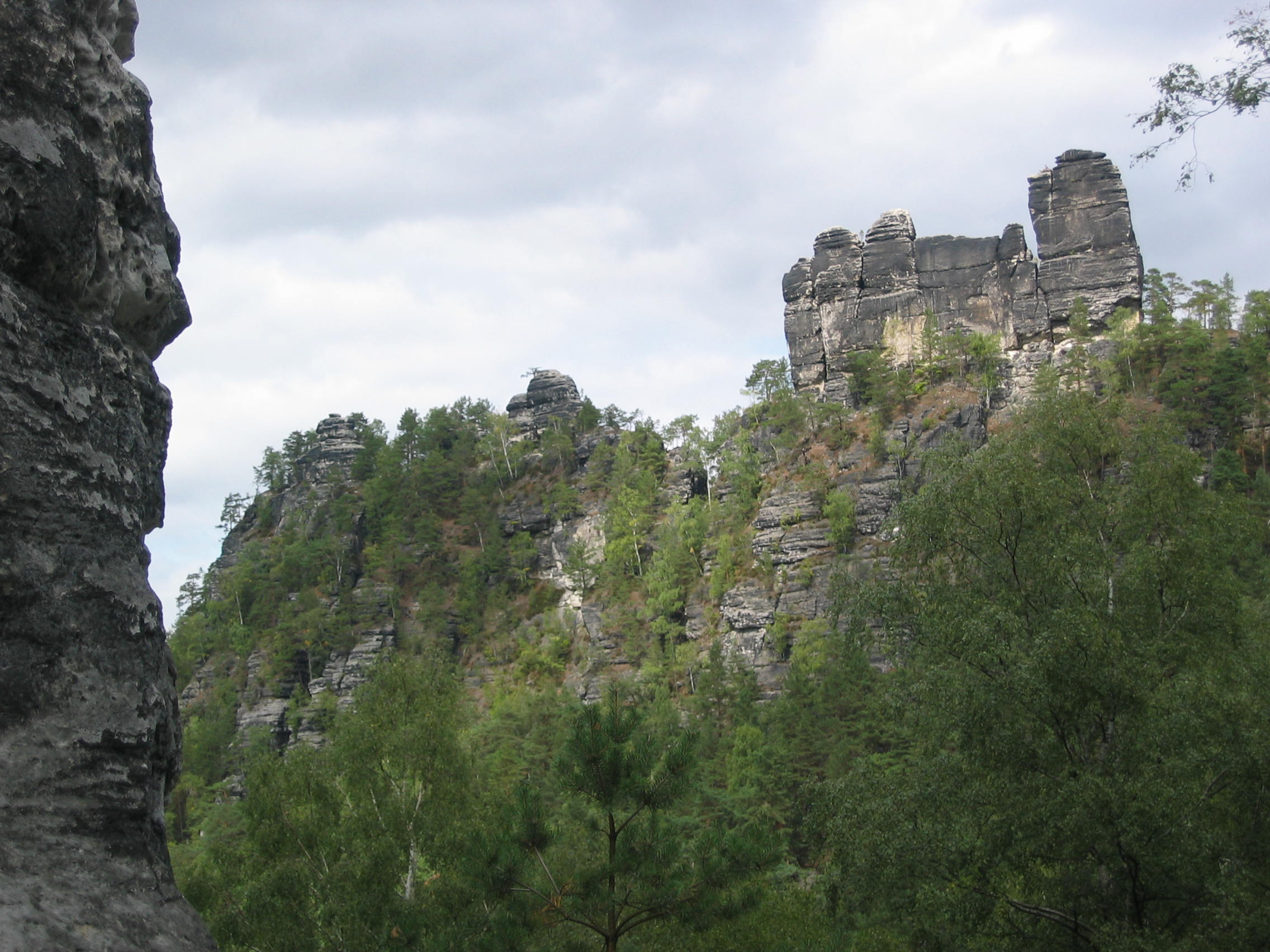
The Lokomotive in Rathen. Left: the Lokomotiv Dom; right: the Esse

The Lokomotive (German for "locomotive") is a striking climbing rock north of Kurort Rathen in Saxon Switzerland in Germany. The rock, which resembles a steam locomotive in appearance, is also known as Große Ruine, is about 30 metres high and is divided into two parts: known as Lokomotive-Dom ("Locomotive Dome") and Lokomotive-Esse ("Locomotive Chimney"). The ridge between the two is called the Kesselgrat ("Boiler Ridge"), the rock teeth next to the Esse as Pfeife ("Whistle"). For a short time there was a weather vane on the dome in the shape of a wheel. The Lokomotive rises on the massif of the Honigsteine.

The Dome of the Lokomotive was first climbed in 1886 by Friedrich Hartmann and Robert Kappmeier. In the history of free climbing in Saxon Switzerland the climb of the Esse on 7 June 1903 by Albert Kunze and Oliver Perry-Smith was the first ascent of the Esse and the first step in climbing the open face. Until then climbers had focussed on chimneys and crevices. The first ascent of the grade V Lokomotivüberfall climbing route on the Esse unleashed an intensive period of climbing in Saxon Switzerland that lasted until 1910, during which climbers like Kunze, Perry-Smith and Rudolf Fehrmann made the first ascent of many important climbing peaks, like the Barbarine, the Große Herkulessäule, the Jungfer or the Teufelsturm.

== Sources ==
- Karl Däweritz: Klettern im Sächsischen Fels, Sportverlag Berlin, Berlin, 1979.
- Dietmar Heinicke (ed.): Kletterführer Sächsische Schweiz, Band Wehlener Gebiet/Rathener Gebiet/Brand, Dresden, 2003, ISBN 3-934514-06-5
- Rudolf Fehrmann: Der Bergsteiger in der Sächsischen Schweiz, Verlagsanstalt Johannes Siegel, Dresden, 1908.
