= Climbing rock =

Individual rock formation, rock face or rock group on which climbing is permitted

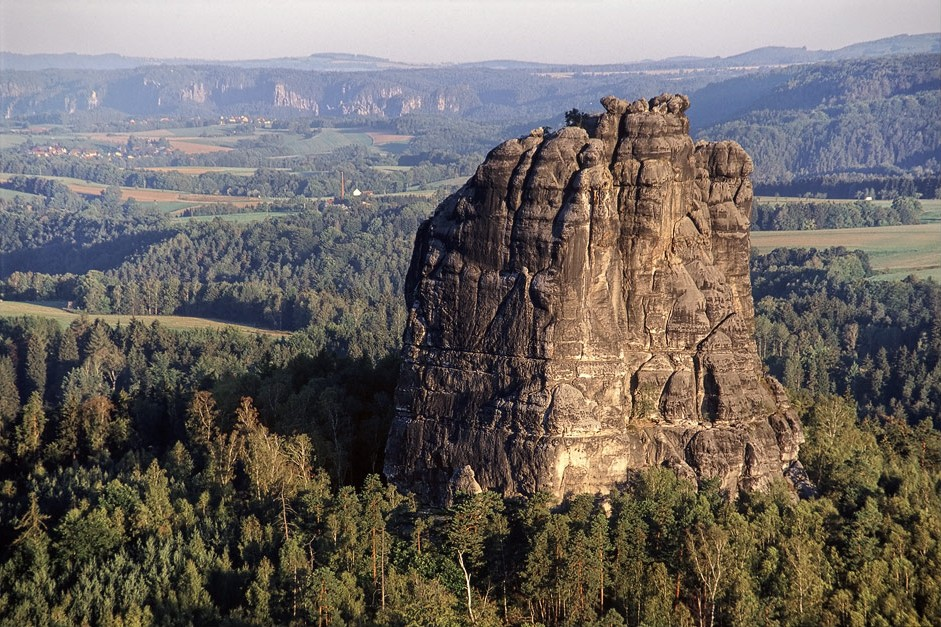
Falkenstein, Saxon Switzerland

A climbing rock (German: Kletterfelsen; regionally also Kletterfels or Klettergipfel) is a term used especially in Germany for an individual rock formation, rock face or rock group on which climbing is permitted. Designated climbing rocks are listed in climbing guidebooks and are usually incorporated and marked within the climbing areas of the alpine clubs. The concept is mainly relevant to climbing outside or on the fringes of the Alps. Special climbing regulations normally apply to climbing rocks, such as those for Saxon Switzerland, and there are usually restrictions to take account of conservation laws and requirements.

Examples of climbing rocks in Germany are the Alpawand (over 600 metres height difference), the Asselstein (58 m) and the Falkenstein in Saxon Switzerland. The German Alpine Club (DAV) maintains a website listing over 3,000 individual rocks in 28 climbing regions with around 250 climbing areas.

== Sources ==
- Rudolf Fehrmann: Der Bergsteiger in der Sächsischen Schweiz. Führer durch die Kletterfelsen des Elbsandsteingebirges, Verlagsanstalt Johannes Siegel, Dresden 1908
- Christian Hacker: Kletterfelsen von Wien bis Semmering, Eigenverlag, Vienna 1995
