= Teufelsturm (Saxon Switzerland) =

Coordinates: 50°54′19.55″N 14°13′7.48″E

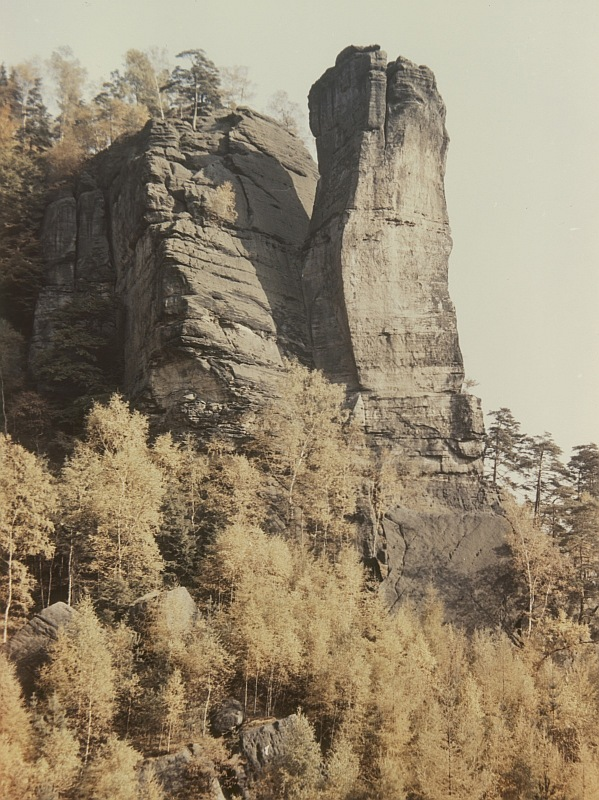
The Teufelsturm

The Teufelsturm (also Butterweckfels or Mittagstein) is a prominent rock tower and climbing rock formed of Elbe Sandstone, about forty metres high in Saxon Switzerland in northeastern Germany. It is located east of the River Elbe on the upper edge of the valley between Schmilka and Bad Schandau in the Schrammsteinen. The Teufelsturm is also referred to as the "Symbol of Saxon Climbing".

== Origin of the name ==
The oldest name for the peak is probably Butterweck ("Bread and butter") or Butterweckfels, because the summit bears a certain resemblance to a bread roll when seen from a distance, such as from the other bank of the Elbe. The name Teufelsturm was already being used by Wilhelm Leberecht Götzinger in his descriptions of Saxon Switzerland, where he mentioned it as a sundial by the farmers on the plateaux around Schöna and Reinhardtsdorf. The shadow thrown by the Teufelsturm on the rock face behind it - when seen from the direction of Reinhardtsdorf-Schöna - disappears around midday exactly behind the rock tower, which is therefore also called the Mittagstein or Mittagfels (i.e. "Midday Rock"). Another name is Campanile, probably derived from similarly named summits in the Dolomites and the Brenta, so-named because of their smooth rock faces and generally rectangular structure of the tower. The name most used today, Teufelsturm ("Devil's Tower") probably arose due to the difficulty of climbing the rock tower.

== Rock climbing ==
At the beginning of the 20th century, the Teufelsturm was one of the most difficult climbing rocks in Saxon Switzerland. On 9 September 1906, Oliver Perry-Smith made the first successful ascent on the Alter Weg, today classified as climbing grade VIIb or, without support, VIIc (Saxon scale). This achievement was the high point of the first development period for the Saxon Switzerland Climbing Region and was then described as "the most difficult climbing in Saxon Switzerland".

In the 1930s, the valley side (Talseite) of the Teufelsturm was seen as one of the last, great, sport climbing challenges in Saxon Switzerland, after initial attempts, including one by Emanuel Strubich, had come to naught in the 1920s. In 1936, Rudolf Stolle finally climbed it for the first time. Today it is graded as a VIIIb climb. Its ascent remains disputed, because the first climber, both in the lower section as well as at the key point, used a safety ring and thus supported himself over the key point (he used a human climbing tree (Steigbaum).

An important first climb was the ascent in 1965 of the Ostwand ("East Face", grade VIIIc) by Kurt Richter. In the 1970s and 1980s, Bernd Arnold climbed the Sonnenuhr (1977, IXa) and the Teufelei (1984, Xa) routes, whose difficulties made them among the top achievements of their day.

The most important route has to be the Pferdefuß. First conquered in 1984 by Werner Schönlebe, it runs along a prominent edge and is climbed in red point style and is classified as grade Xc.

In 2007, Heinz Zak first used a Highline from the Teufelsturm to the neighbouring massif, which led to discussions about the sense and purpose of trendy types of sport in Saxon Switzerland.

== Sources ==
- Rudolf Fehrmann: Der Bergsteiger in der Sächsischen Schweiz. Verlagsanstalt Johannes Siegel, Dresden 1908
- Dietmar Heinicke (Gesamtredaktion): Kletterführer Sächsische Schweiz, Band Schrammsteine/Schmilkaer Gebiet, Berg- & Naturverlag Peter Rölke, Dresden 1999, ISBN 3-934514-01-4
- Frank Richter: Klettern im Elbsandsteingebirge, Bruckmann-Verlag, 1993
- Kurt B. Richter: Der Sächsische Bergsteiger, Sportverlag Berlin, 1962
