= Campanile Basso =

Mountain in Italy

- Campanile Basso

Highest point
- Elevation: 2,883 m (9,459 ft)
- Coordinates: 46°9′15″N 10°53′55″E

Geography
- Location within Italy
- Location: Italy
- Parent range: Brenta Group, Rhaetian Alps

Climbing
- First ascent: 18 August 1899
- Easiest route: Via Normale

Campanile Basso is a mountain in the Brenta group (It.: Dolomiti di Brenta), a subgroup of the Rhaetian Alps in the Italian Region of Trentino-Alto Adige, with a height of (2,883 metres (9,459 ft)). It is of a slender, almost fully vertical shape on all sides, rising 300 metres straight up. The mountain is named for its similarity in shape to a belltower (It.: campanile) and it being low (It.: basso) compared to the neighboring Campanile Alto and Brenta Alta. The German alpinist Karl Schulz introduced in 1884 the name Guglia di Brenta ("Guglia = "spire"), a name widely used until World War I and especially enduring in German literature, but considered inappropriate by locals and Italian climbers. Geologically, Campanile Basso is entirely formed of Triassic sedimentary rock, dense and compact dolomite. Due to its inaccessible appearance it was long left untouched during the alpine exploration of the Eastern Alps. Around the turn of the century a competitive race for the first ascent started, which took inspiration from the emerging nationalistic feelings in the region, as much as from the ascent of rock climbing as a sport. Most of the illustrious forebears of modern rock climbing climbed this mountain during the first half of the Twentieth century.

== Climbing history ==
The first men to undertake an ascent were Carlo Garbari, Antonio Tavernaro and Nino Pooli, all from Trentino. They climbed on August 12, 1897 along the route that is now known as the Via Normale, scaling the so-called parete Pooli ("Pooli wall/face") and traversing over a horizontal ridge called Stradone Provinciale proceeding vertically on the west side towards a small pulpit now known as Albergo al Sole towards the tiny Terrazzino Garbari. From here there were only 35 meters remaining to the top, of which Pooli covered twelve, but then further progress was considered impossible. Garbari, who had threatened Pooli to "finish the climb or die", left behind a note saying "Who will reach this note? I wish them better luck!"

On August 16, 1899 two students from Innsbruck, Carl Berger and Otto Ampferer, followed the same route. They had been unaware of the attempt two years earlier, but found a climbing hammer, empty wine bottles, and finally Garbari's note. They failed to pass the same crux, but after taking a rest day came back and found a traverse towards the north face from where they could climb to the summit through what is now known as the parete Ampferer, gaining the first ascent of Campanile Basso on August 18, 1899. (Via Normale, III/IV)

Nino Pooli returned in 1904 to climb at last the part that he couldn't master in 1897 (Via Pooli-Trenti, V+, W wall, 35 m.).

The Via Normale was indeed a winding trajectory but remained the only existing route to the top until 1908. In that year a young German lawyer and his dashing (Note: Oliver Perry-Smith (1884–1969) was apparently known as an avid Bugatti driver. He is credited to have led the 'seilschaft' with Fehrmann during the ascent. See: DAV Panorama, nr 5, 1990, page 29, and AAJ) American friend decided to climb this mountain from its very base where the big shoulder on its west side sticks out. Rudolf Fehrmann and Oliver Perry-Smith thus traced a completely new route along the south-west dihedral up to the top of the shoulder and from there connecting to the Via Normale (Via Fehrmann, IV+, SW dihedral, 350 m.). Paul Preuss came in 1911 and -after making the second ascent of the Fehrmann route- climbed in solitary a completely new and much more direct and elegant itinerary on the east face that goes straight up from the Stradone Provinciale (Via Preuss, E wall, 110 m., V/IV). King Albert of Belgium (le Roi Alpiniste) climbed Campanille Basso in 1933 by the Via Preuss, giving name to the Terrazzino Re dei Belgi. Giorgio Graffer traced two classical routes in 1933-'34 on other sides of the mountain: (Spigolo Graffer (NE edge) - 110m - V (1933) and Via Graffer - SW edge - 380m - V+ (1934)). During the next decades another number of classical climbing routes was opened: Via Armani (N wall) - 200m - V/VI (1934), Via Fedrizzi-Armani (S wall) - 260m - VI (1935), Spigolo Fox (SE edge) - 110m - V+ (1937), Via Cristina - NW edge - 380m - VI- (1947), Via Rovereto - W - 380m - VI/A2 (1961), Via Stenico-Navasa (S wall) - 380m - VI/A2 (1962), Via Maestri-Claus (N wall) - 110m - VI/A1 (1965), Via Schubert-Werner (SW edge) - 380m - VI (1968). Every alpinist of note during the first half of the twentieth century made an ascent by one of these itineraries or the innumerable variants thereof. In 1940 the number of entries in the summit book had reached the magic number of thousand. By 1970 that number had been multiplied by five.

Campanile Basso from the south-east where the Via Fehrmann leads up to the shoulder.(1924)

Campanile Basso as seen from the summit of Cima Tosa (early 1920s)

On Campanile Basso

== Today ==
Nowadays, climbers find endless variations to climb to the top. That top consists of a roughly square plateau with a small platform on which a set of tubular bells is placed, along with a small crucifix and a summit book. Because the numbering of the entries in the book has become irregular since 1963 it is difficult to ascertain the exact number of ascents since 1899. The descent is done by double rope abseil, roughly along the lines of the Via Normale. For this purpose large ringed pitons are put in place with minimal intervals of 25 meters. In 1936 a via ferrata, the so-called Via delle Bocchette was traced along he foot of the mountain passing over the Bocchetta del Campanile Basso and the Bocchetta del Campanile Alto. This route is the best way to approach the mountain and/or to get an impression of Campanile Basso from close by.

== Context ==
Trentino was 'Welshtirol', part of the Austro-Hungarian Empire in 1899. But the spirit of Irredentismo was firmly present among the local alpinists, who had founded their own Società deli Alpinisti Tridentini. Legend has it that Berger and Ampferer, during their first ascent of Campanile Basso had planted a small but 'Germanic' flag on the top and that a few days later Nino Pooli and Riccardo Trenti climbed to the top again to replace that flag by a 10 meter wide yellow-bleu Alpinisti Tridentini flag. The fate of its first climbers would have a sometimes strangely connected place in the turmoil of the two World Wars. Ampferer became an important geologist and member of the Austrian Scientific Academy while Berger fell on the front lines (Note: In a tragic case of 'friendly fire', Berger was shot on patrol by accident by one of his comrades. See DAV Panorama, nr 5, 1990, page 30.) during the First World War in 1915. Garbari continued as an Alpine Guide and played a role in the First World War and the accession of Trentino to Italy. Perry Smith left Europe at the start of the First World War, (Note: Perry Smith became involved in skiing from 1909 on and even represented Germany at the 1914 Holmenkollen contest. After his return to the US he settled in Colorado and resumed climbing. He became an Honorary Member of the American Alpine Club (AAC).) and Fehrmann became a Nazi during the Second World War and died under dire circumstances in Soviet political detention. Paul Preuss died young in a fall on the Gosaukamm in 1913, two years after his exploits on Campanile Basso. The Nazis tried to eradicate the memory of Preuss, who was of Jewish descent, but he is now regarded as a hero and a founding father of free climbing. King Albert, hero of the First World War, died in 1934, a year after his ascent of the Via Preuss, also in a fall, at Marche-les-Dames. Giorgio Graffer was shot down in his fighter aircraft over Albania in 1940.
