= Monch =

Monch may refer to:

- Mönch, mountain in the Swiss Alps
- Erich Mönch (1905–1977), German artist
- Mönch (rock), climbing rock in Saxon Switzerland
- Mönch, proper name of the star HD 130322
- Mistigri (card game), also known as Mönch
- Monj, Razavi Khorasan, village in Iran
