= SBB (disambiguation) =

SBB usually refers to the Swiss Federal Railways, the national railway company of Switzerland.

SBB may also refer to:

== Arts and entertainment ==
- SBB (band), a Polish progressive rock band, or their self-titled albums:
  - SBB (1974 album)
  - SBB (1978 album, Amiga)
- Seán Bán Breathnach, also known as SBB, Irish TV personality
- Saas Bahu aur Betiyaan, a television programme on the Indian channel Aaj Tak
- Soldier Boy Ben, a superhero in the third season of the television series The Boys

== Companies ==
- Serbia Broadband (Serbian: Српске кабловске мреже, Srpske kablovske mreže), a cable television and broadband internet service provider in Serbia

== Technology ==
- Solid bleached board, a paperboard grade
- Storage Building Block, an individual tape or disk drive component used in a computer data storage array or library
- SwiftBroadband, a satellite-based communication network for aircraft
- Screened Bottom Board, also known as Open Mesh Floor, a device used to protect beehives from Varroa destructor mites

== Others ==
- Sara–Bongo–Bagirmi languages, a branch of Nilo-Saharan languages spoken in central Africa
- Saxon Climbers' Federation (German: Sächsischer Bergsteigerbund), now part of the German Alpine Club
- Berlin State Library (German: Staatsbibliothek zu Berlin)
- Union for a Better Future of BiH (Bosnian: Savez za bolju budućnost BiH), Bosnian political party
- Super Blocky Ball, an experience on the gaming platform Roblox
