= Mönch (rock) =

Coordinates: 50°57′40.50522″N 14°4′33.89774″E

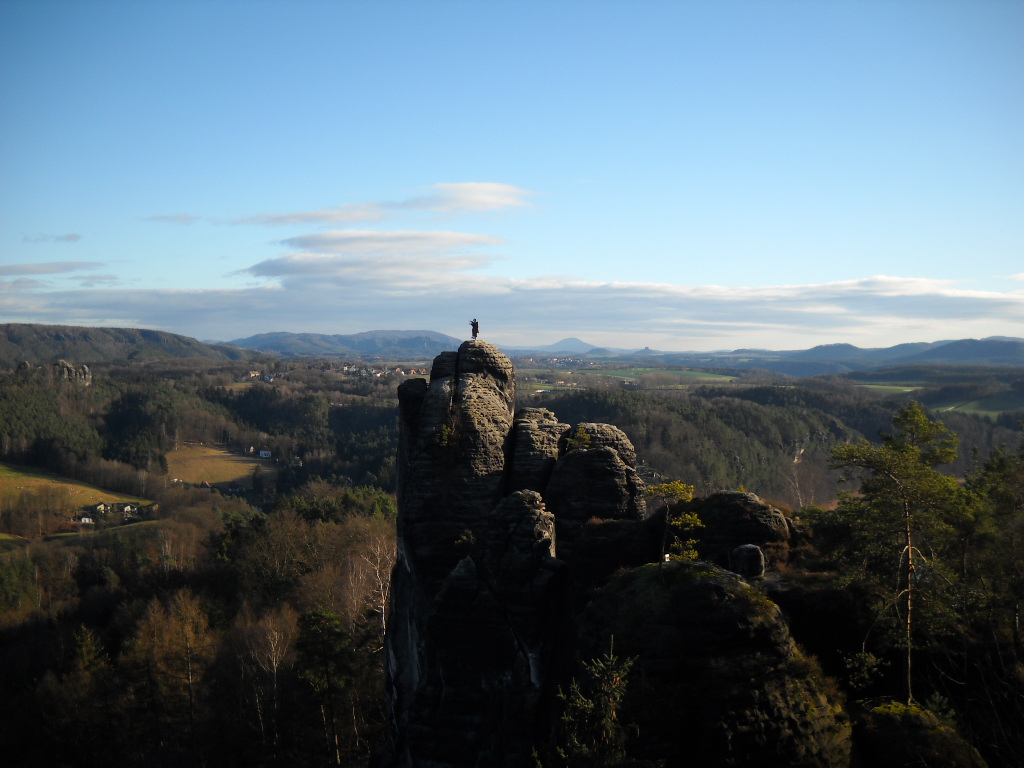
View of the Mönch from Neurathen Castle

The Mönch (also Mönchstein) is a rock pinnacle and popular climbing peak in Saxon Switzerland in Germany near the spa town of Rathen. The weather vane on the summit, in the shape of a tin monk, is visible from afar and acts as a navigation aid.

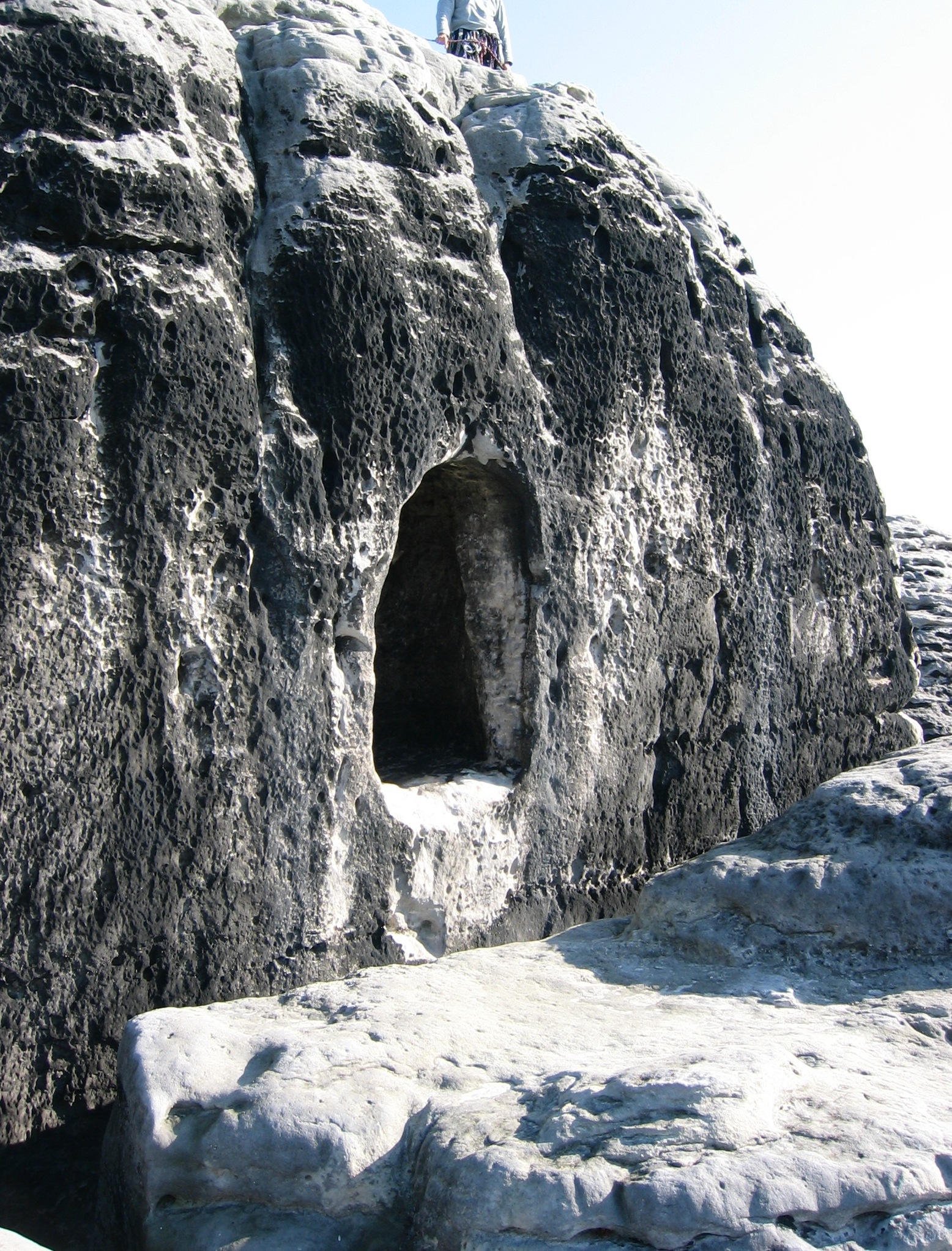
The Mönchsloch, a shelter for the guard post on the rock castle

In the Middle Ages the rock was used as a lookout for Neurathen Castle due to its prominent location. From that time stems the Mönchsloch ("Monk's Hole") hewn out of the rock just below the summit, a shelter about 1.75 metres high and 1.35 metres deep that was used by the guard post of the castle. The rock castle was destroyed in 1469 and fell into ruins. With it disappeared the medieval staircase that enabled the Mönch to be climbed, although traces of the timber beams remain today. Since that time the summit may only be reached by climbing.

The rocks were occasionally climbed thereafter; tradition recording ascents in the years 1632, 1777 and 1803. After gymnasts from Bad Schandau had made the first recreational ascent of the Falkenstein in 1864, the first ascent of the Mönch for similar reasons followed 10 years later, in 1874, made by O. Ufer and H. Frick. This was the first ascent of a climbing rock in Saxon Switzerland without artificial aids; whereas hitherto ladders or artificially hewn steps and the like had been used. Climbing without artificial aids is still an important point in the Saxon climbing rules valid today.

The Southeast Way (Südostweg) used by Ufer and Frick (Saxon climbing grade III) is still a popular climbing route today. Since the first recreational ascent of the Mönch, a multitude of other climbing routes have been opened. Even well-known climbers like Oscar Schuster, Rudolf Fehrmann, Emanuel Strubich and Bernd Arnold have made the first ascent of climbing routes on the Mönch. The most difficult ascents in the north face reach levels of difficulty of Saxon grade ten.

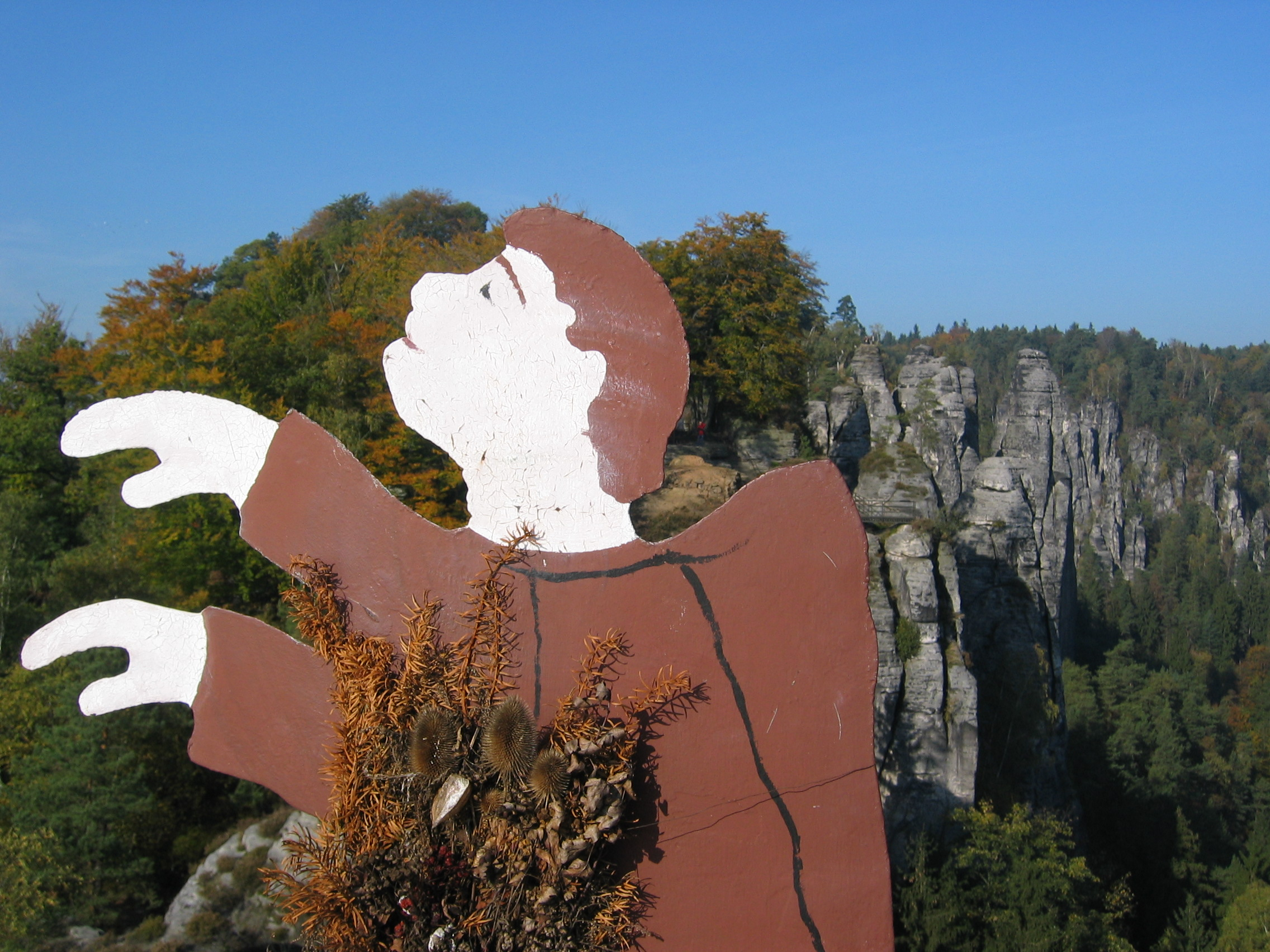
The weather vane on the Mönch

In 1887 a weather vane was erected on the Mönch, as was common on other peaks in the area in those times. The vane was in the shape of a monk's silhouette. Whilst most of the weather vanes and summit symbols were destroyed or dismantled again in the succeeding decades, that on the Mönch was one of the few that remained in Saxon Switzerland. The original figure suffered damage, in 1928 and 1930, and was replaced in 1957 by a faithful replica. The original monk of 1887 may be seen in the museum in Bad Schandau.

== Sources ==
- Peter Rölke (publ.): Wander- & Naturführer Sächsische Schweiz, Vol. 2, Verlag Rölke, Dresden, ISBN 3-934514-09-X
