= Wartturm (crag) =

Coordinates: 50°57′39.50781″N 14°4′1.26″E

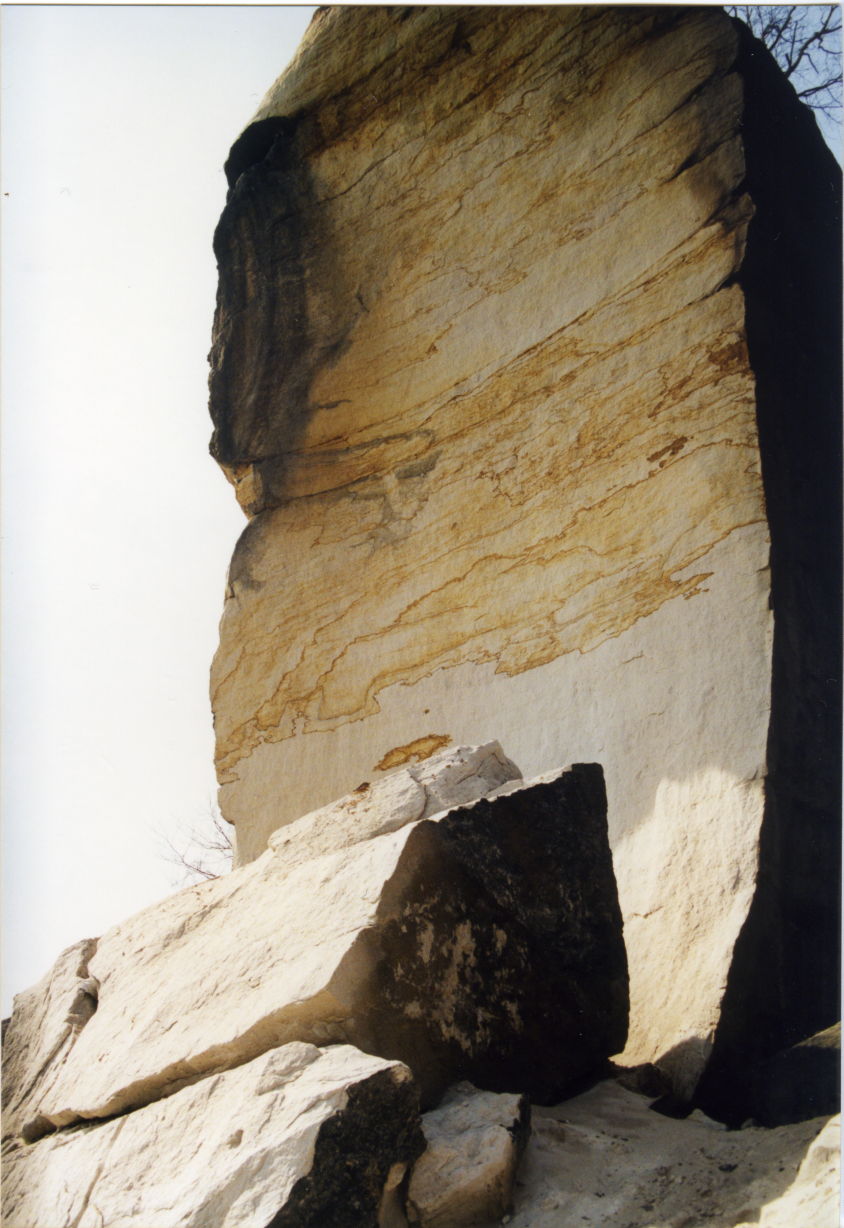
The Wartturm in April 2001

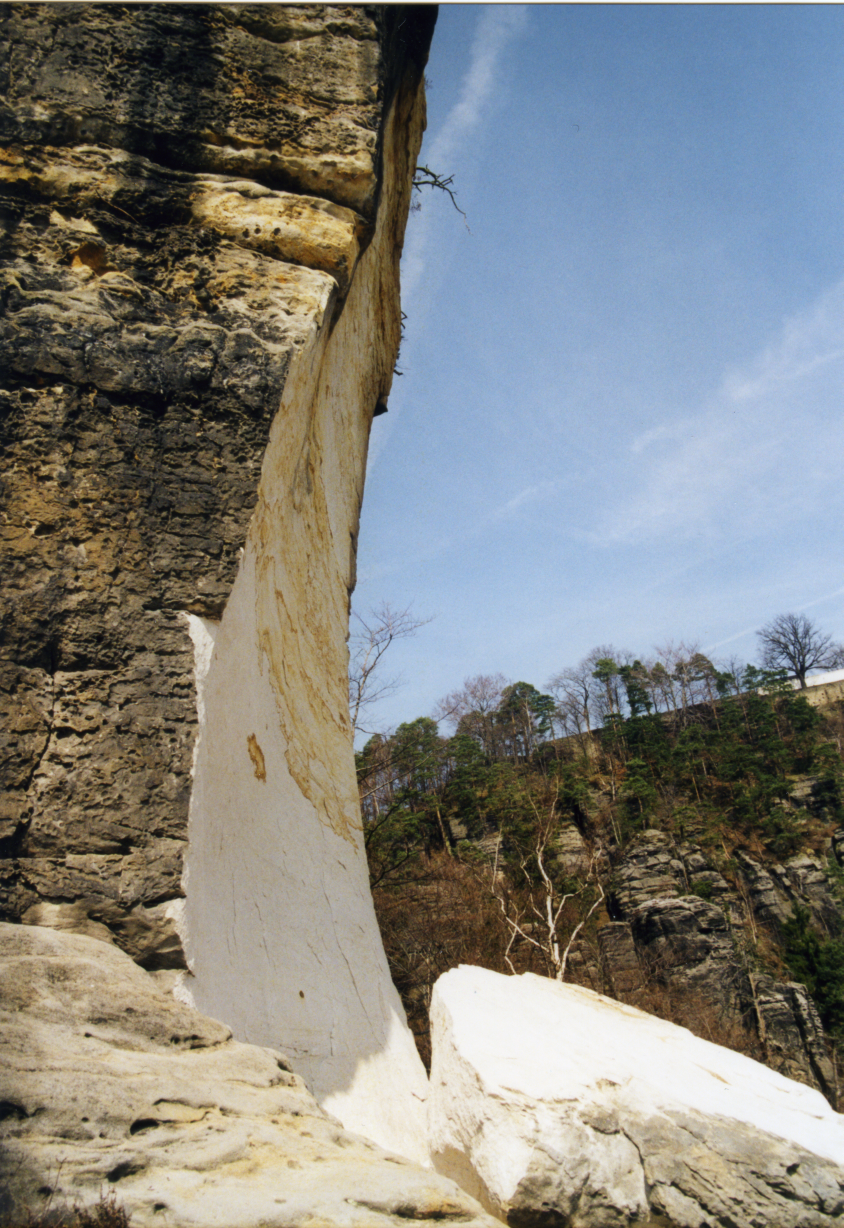
The Wartturm in April 2001

The Wartturm is a rock tower in Saxon Switzerland in East Germany near the famous Bastei rocks. It stands high above the Elbe, just below the town of Rathen and dominates the view from the Bastei and Rathen looking downstream.

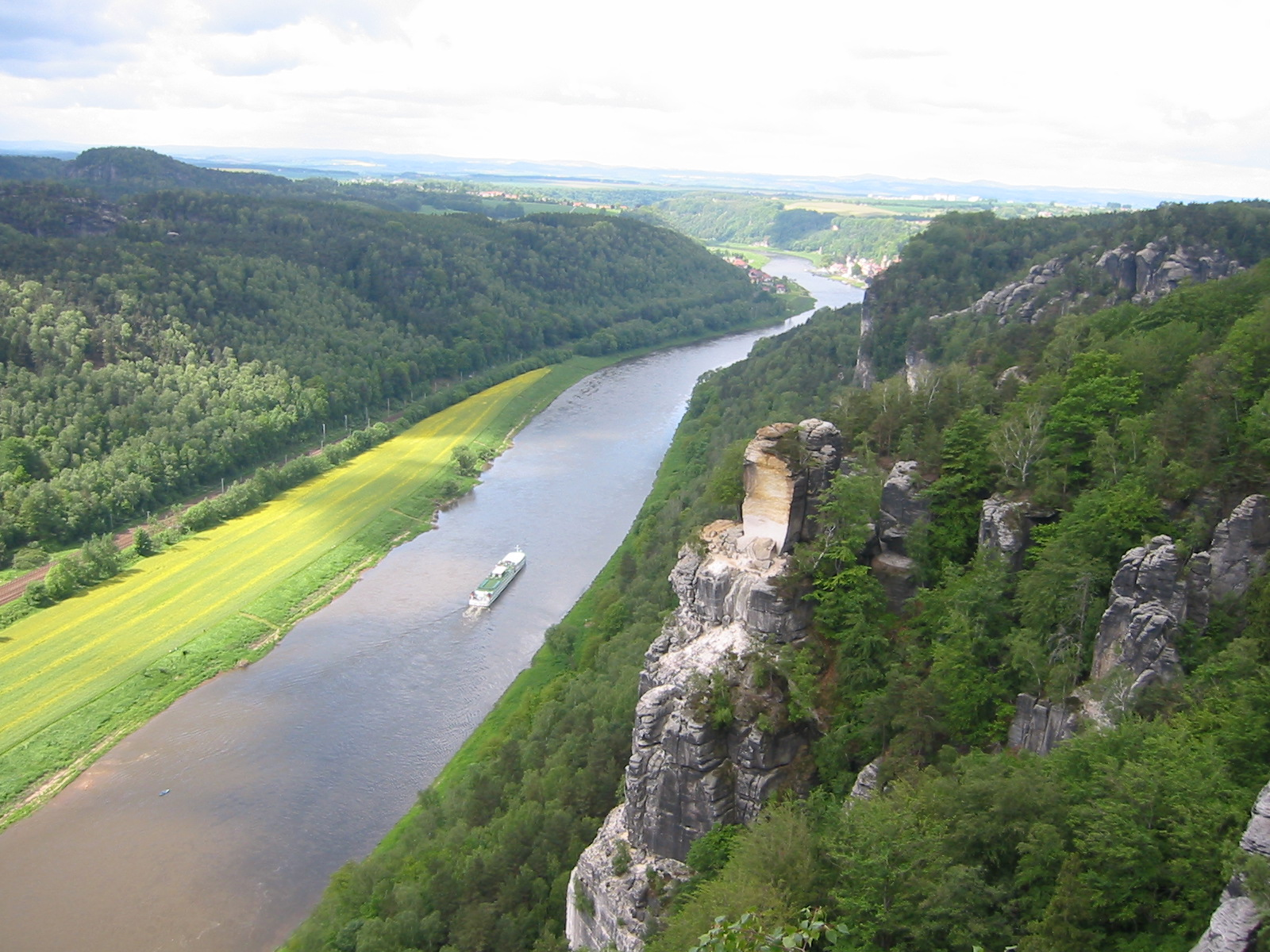
The Elbe and the Wartturm seen from the Bastei.

On 22 November 2000 the Wartturm was the scene of one of the most spectacular rockfalls for decades in Saxon Switzerland. About a third of the rock broke off and some 450 m³ of sandstone with an estimated weight of 800 tonnes crashed over 60 to 75 m into the valley. It was the largest quantity of falling rock since a slide in 1961 on the Bienenkorb, which did not fall from such a great height. The cause was suspected to be progressive weathering of a fissure running through the rock. A climber, who was staying in a hut below the rock, was uninjured because the boulders landed a few metres away from the hut.

Despite the loss of large sections of rock the Wartturm continues to be a popular climbing peak in the Saxon Switzerland Climbing Region.

As a result of the rockfall at the Wartturm, the State Office for the Environment, Agriculture and Geology of the Free State of Saxony has begun test drilling to investigate more closely the causes of rockfalls and the long term progress of weathering of sandstone in Saxon Switzerland.
