= Frienstein =

- Vorderes Raubschloss
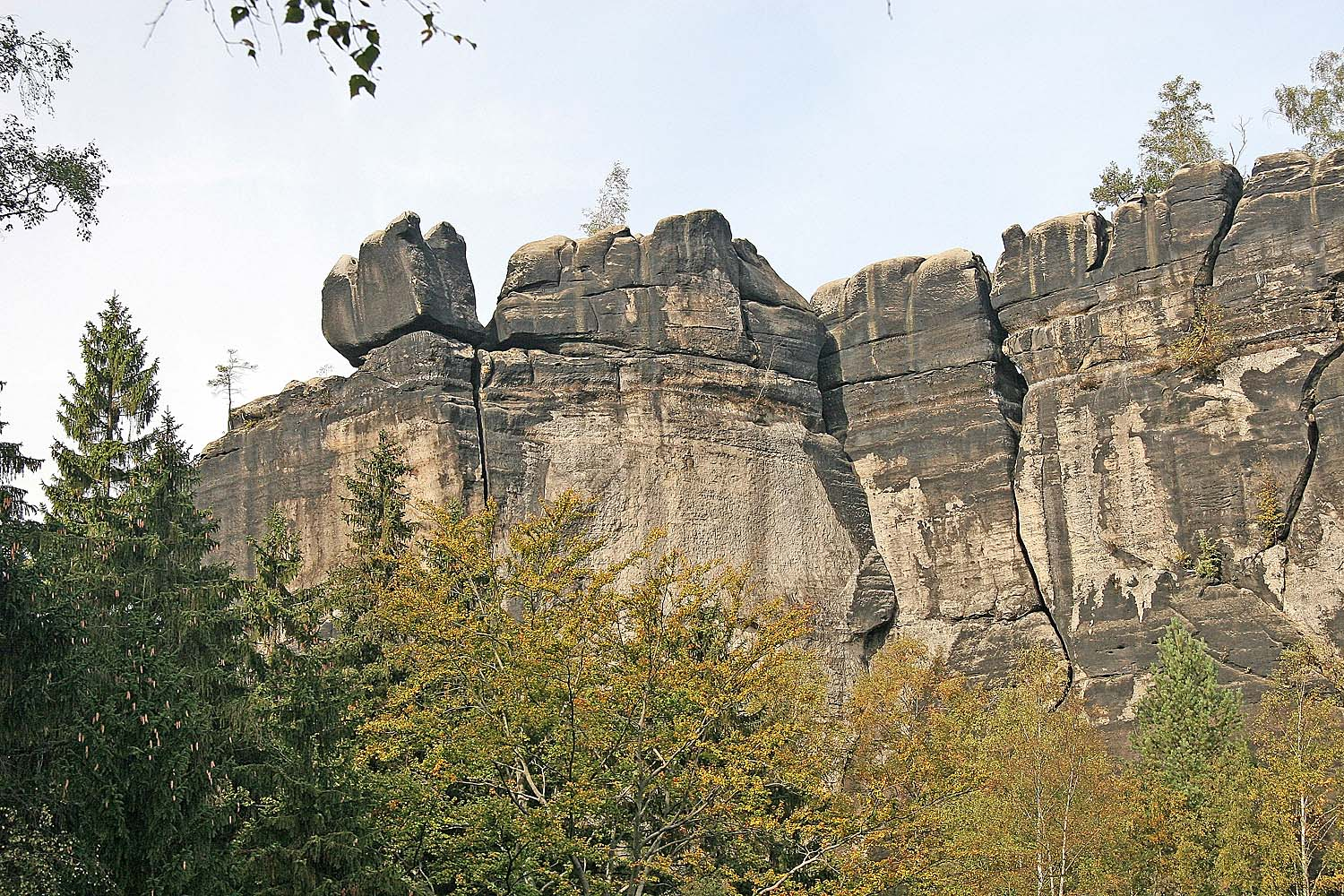

Highest point
- Elevation: 455 m above sea level (HN) (1,492.8 ft)
- Coordinates: 50°54′43″N 14°14′45″E

Geography
- Location within Saxony
- Location: Saxony
- Parent range: Elbe Sandstone Mountains

Geology
- Mountain type: Rock massif
- Rock type: Sandstone

The Frienstein, also called the Vorderes Raubschloss, is a rock formation, about 130 metres high, in Saxon Switzerland. It lies on the northern slopes of the Großer Winterberg in the Affensteine rocks. On the rock there was once a watchtower of the Barony of Wildenstein. Today the Frienstein is a popular climbing peak .

== History ==
Around 1410 a watchtower was erected on the Frienstein as a signal station by the Barony of Wildenstein that was owned by the family of Berka of Dubá. By this means Frienstein could make contact with the surrounding watchtowers on the Winterstein, the Neuer Wildenstein and the Alter Wildenstein. In 1451, the Frienstein, together with the rest of the barony, went to the House of Wettin and thus to the Electorate of Saxony. In the period that followed, robber knights lodged on the Frienstein, even in 1479 one of their workers conceded that "item near Frienstein is a trap..., where those who are caught are tormented" (item beym Freynstein ist eyn loch ..., do man die gefangen eynfurt zu peynigen). On the first cartographic record in Saxony, a map dating to 1592 by Matthias Oeder, the rock is marked as Freystein.

On the present-day climbing route called the Alter Weg ("Old Way"), one can still see the rebates and steps cut out of the rock that was once used to climb it. Even on the summit area, there are traces of the watchtower in the shape of rebates for anchoring a wooden observation post.

On the eastern side at the foot of the rock is the Ida Grotto (Idagrotte), a large crevice and bedding cave that is nowadays a popular destination. It can only be reached over a narrow band of rock. In the grotto, there are still traces of its medieval use as a living area.

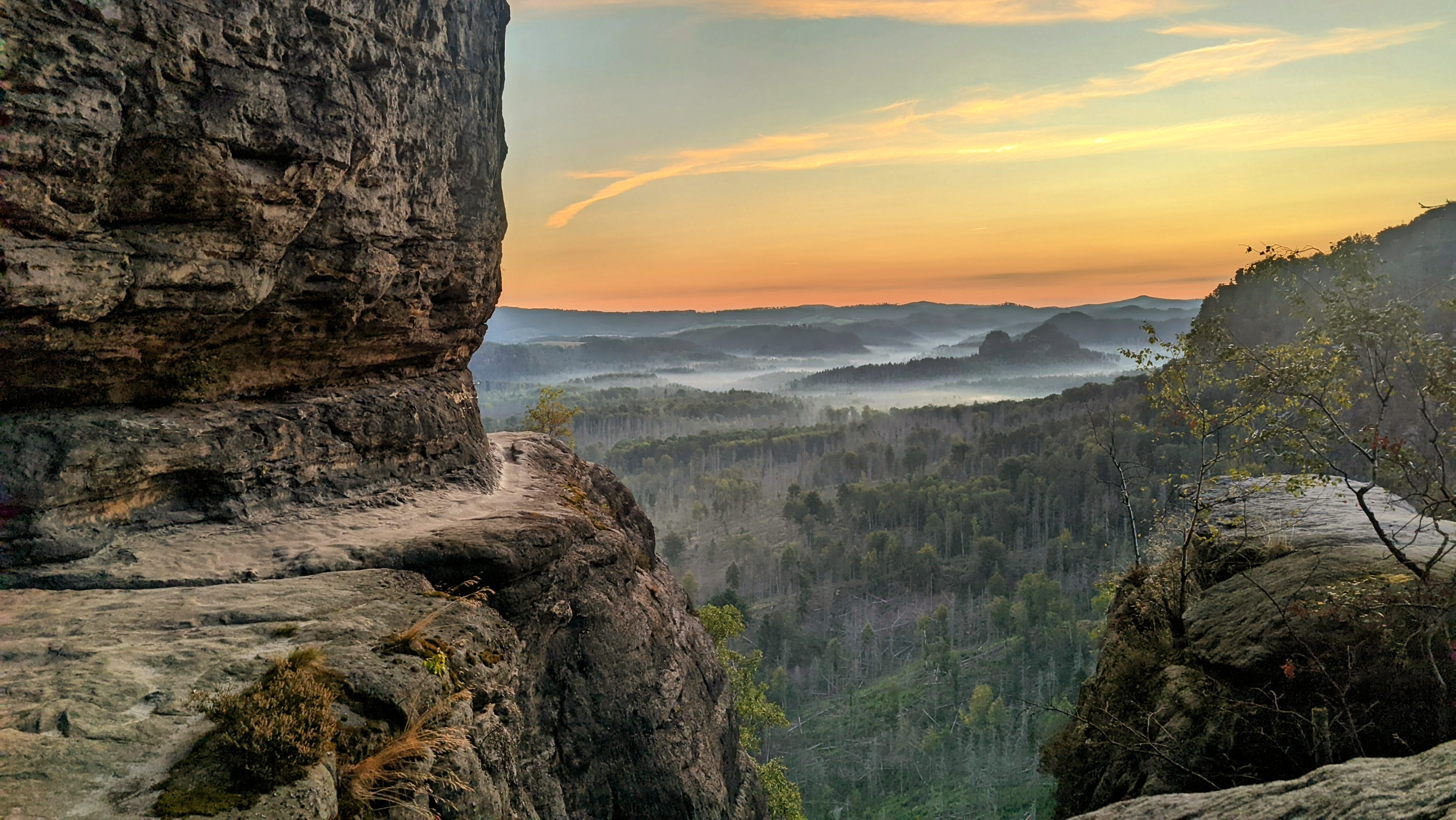
Ida Grotto (Idagrotte) at dawn

Because of its size and the fact that it is easy to get to, the Ida Grotto is a popular goal for Boofers, a Saxon term for hikers who sleep out in the open. However, in recent years, there have been repeated cases of hikers who have fallen and been seriously injured or killed due to being intoxicated with alcohol.

== Climbing peak ==
The Frienstein is a famous climbing peak in the Saxon Switzerland Climbing Region, but its summit is not accessible to hikers and walkers. The first recreational ascent of the mountain took place in 1873, although it had been conquered before with the help of artificial aids. Today's route, known as the Alter Weg is classified as climbing grade III. There are also more challenging routes up to grade XIb. Climbing history was written on the Königshangel when grade IX was reached for the first time in Saxon Switzerland. In 1965, it was successfully climbed for the first time by Fritz Eske after several unsuccessful attempts by other noteworthy climbers.

== Sources ==
- Peter Rölke (publ.): Wander- & Naturführer Sächsische Schweiz, Vol. 1, Verlag Rölke, Dresden 1999, ISBN 3-934514-08-1
