= Falkenstein (Saxon Switzerland) =

Rock peak in Saxon Switzerland

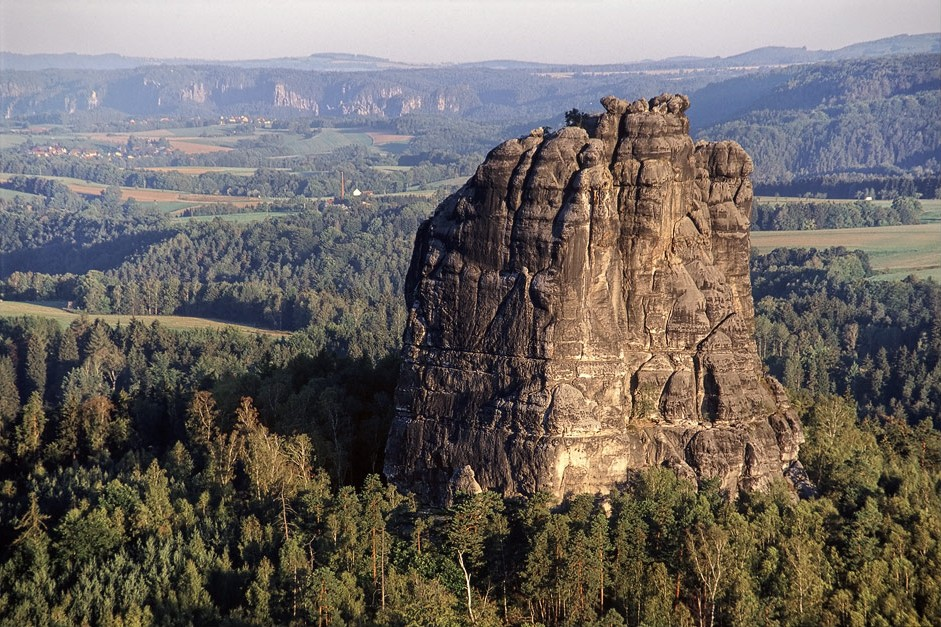
- The Falkenstein seen from the Schrammsteine

Highest point
- Elevation: 381.2 m above sea level (HN) (1,251 ft)
- Coordinates: 50°55′06″N 14°12′04″E

Geography
- Location within Saxony
- Location: Saxony, Germany
- Parent range: Saxon Switzerland

Geology
- Rock age: Cretaceous
- Mountain type(s): Sandstone Stage d Rock summit

Climbing
- First ascent: 1864 by Schandau gymnasts
- Easiest route: Schusterweg III

The Falkenstein is one of the best-known climbing peaks in Saxon Switzerland. It is situated near the rocky Schrammsteine ridge southeast of the town of Bad Schandau. The Falkenstein is nearly 90 m high and consists of sandstone. In the Middle Ages there were fortifications on top of the rock. Even today, the steps carved into the rock are still visible.

== History ==
The Falkenstein was probably built on and used as a castle lookout from the middle of the 14th century. Like almost all of Saxon Switzerland on the right bank of the Elbe, it belonged to the Barony of Hohnstein with its seat at Hohnstein Castle, which was given to the Bohemian noble family of Berka von Dubá in 1353 by Emperor Charles IV as a Bohemian fiefdom.

In 1409 Hinko von der Duba divided the territory among his five sons. The Falkenstein went to his son Henry as part of the new Barony of Wildenstein. He set up his seat of power in the castle at New Wildenstein. In addition to the surrounding villages and towns, the lordship also included other watchtowers, e.g. on the Rauschenstein and the Frienstein. From about 1425, Henry von der Duba was repeatedly feuding with the Lusatian League and the Saxon Electors. His nephews, who inherited the barony around 1435, continued the feuds and attacked villages and merchant trains as robber barons. However, with the exception of the Elbe, there were no trade routes in the immediate vicinity of the Falkenstein. An old communication route from Postelwitz to Sebnitz gave the watchtower strategic importance in these feuds and access to the Elbe and the Kirnitzsch valley. It also secured access from the Elbe to Wildenstein Castle.

Elector Frederick II of Saxony finally besieged the Berkas on the Wildenstein from autumn 1439 to put an end to the feuds. The watchtower on the Falkenstein was probably destroyed during this campaign. The Berkas finally agreed in 1451 to an exchange of the Barony of Wildenstein for part of the Barony of Schluckenau in Bohemia. With this, the Falkenstein finally became Saxon property. In the list of castles created in 1456, the Falkenstein was already one of the watchtowers described as derelict.

In 1543 and 1547 the rock is mentioned as part of the forests belonging to Hohnstein. The map of the first Electoral Saxon state survey, created by Matthias Oeder in 1592 describes it as "bare and high". During the Thirty Years' War, residents of the surrounding towns hid themselves on the Falkenstein, as weather-beaten inscriptions, including the year "1631", bear witness to.

Pastor Wilhelm Leberecht Götzinger, who was interested in natural history, described the rock in 1804 as inaccessible and only accessible via ladders. In 1812 his proposal to establish and secure an ascent that could be used by tourists was rejected by the Saxon Forestry Commission due to the high costs. In the years that followed, there were occasional reports of ascents, without more precise names and dates being given.

In 1864, the ascent by Schandau gymnasts on the Gymnasts' Route (Turnerweg), which is still known today, marked the birth of Saxon climbing. After lengthy preparations, Gustav Tröger, Ernst Fischer, J. Wähnert and H. Frenzel, all members of the Schandau Men's Gymnastics Club (Männer-Turnvereins zu Schandau), founded in 1847, climbed to the top. They erected a flagpole on the summit and flew three flags from it. Tröger published a report on 2 April 1864 in the Dresden News (Dresdner Nachrichten). The gymnasts still used artificial aids that are not permitted under today's rules. Nevertheless, this first verifiable modern ascent is considered the beginning of climbing in Saxon Switzerland due to its primarily sporting intentions. Another ascent by Dresden gymnasts is documented in 1868, as they chiselled their names into the rock in the exit area. An ascent in 1871 is also documented by the names carved on it. In 1878, on the occasion of the silver wedding of the Saxon royal couple, four members of the Schandau branch of the Saxon Switzerland Mountaineering Club (Gebirgsverein für die Sächsische Schweiz) lit a bonfire on the summit. Plans to create a more generally accessible ascent came up again, which also failed due to lack of funds.

At the end of 1894, a weather vane in the form of a falcon was mounted on the Falkenstein as a summit mark. In 1903 the flag had to be repaired after being damaged. In 1929, the falcon, whose existence had been repeatedly criticized as a blight, disappeared from the summit. A year later, the metal figure was discovered by chance in a crevice in the rock. At first it remained in the possession of a climbing club, since 1951 the falcon has been held by the local history museum of Bad Schandau.

Götzinger was already aware of the existence of the old watchtower. In 1878, during the ascent at that time, a broken medieval clay pot was discovered. In 1892, while descending the Turnerweg after the first ascent of the Schusterweg, Oscar Schuster and Martin Klimmer discovered artificial steps under the vegetation that had been part of the ascent to the watchtower. In 1940, Dresden architect and local historian, Oskar Pusch, carried out a major investigation of the fortification at Falkenstein. Based on the results, he created a graphic reconstruction of the watchtower. He also discovered traces of fire debris, which indicate that the watchtower had been destroyed in fighting.

In 1964 and 1989, festival weeks were held to mark the anniversary of the first ascent. In 1989, a rope team climbed the Turnerweg without using today's climbing shoes and ropes, wearing clothing and equipment based on the first climbers of the time.

== Climbing today ==
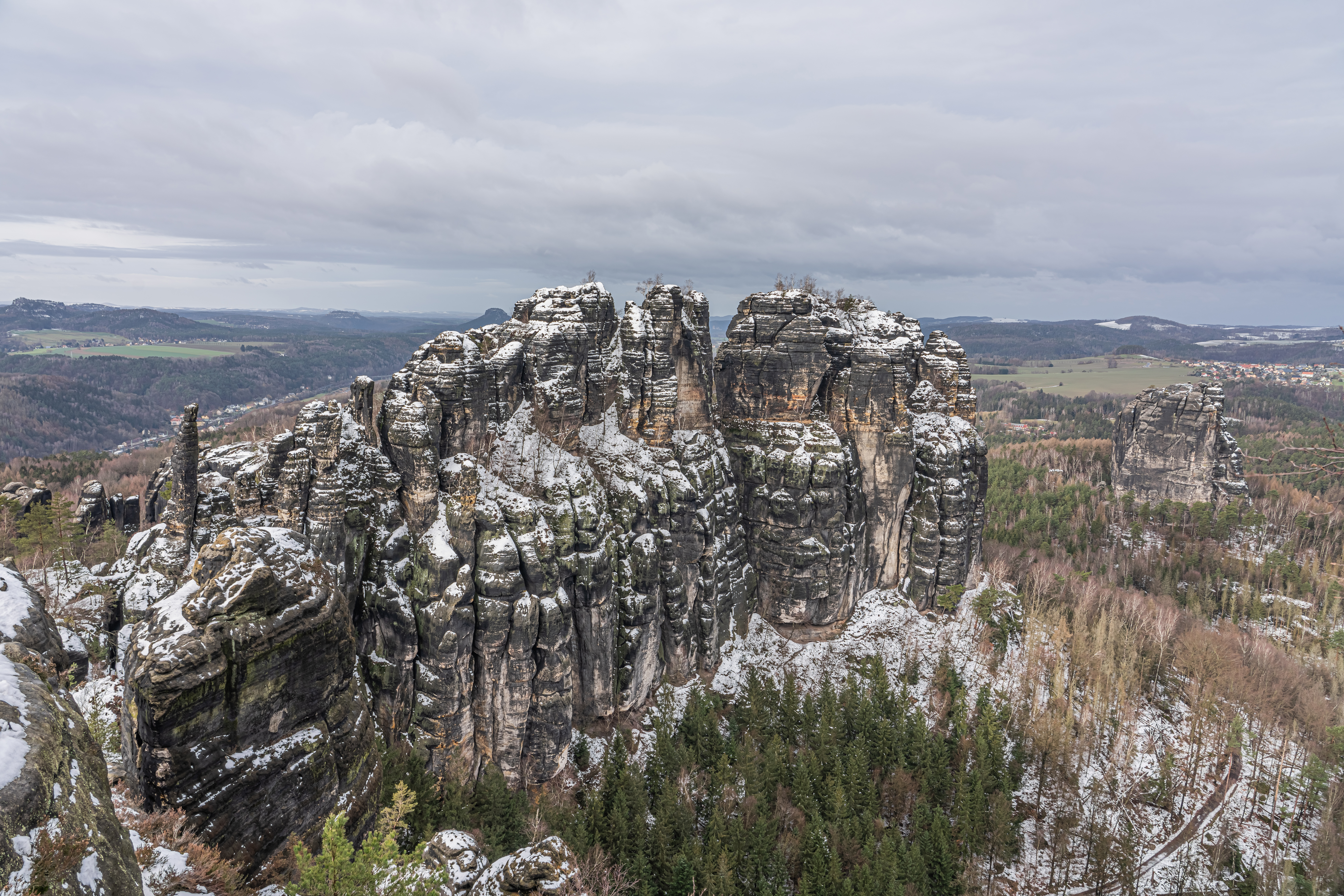
Part of the Schrammsteine with the Falkenstein in the background

The peak of the Falkenstein can only be reached by skilled climbers. Nowadays more than 100 routes lead to the top. The most popular ascent is Schusterweg (III), which was first climbed by Oskar Schuster in 1893.

Other notable climbs on the 'Falkenstein' (with their Saxon rating grades) are the:

- Südriss (VIIa) – first ascent by Oliver Perry-Smith in 1913
- Direkte Westkante (VIIIb) – first ascent by Wulf Scheffler in 1956
- Buntschillernde Seifenblase (IXb) – first ascent by Bernd Arnold

== Sources ==
- Der Falkenstein, Aus der Geschichte eines Kletterfelsens in der Sächsischen Schweiz, Neisse Verlag 2001, ISBN 3-934038-12-3
