= Bernd Arnold =

German rock climber and mountaineer

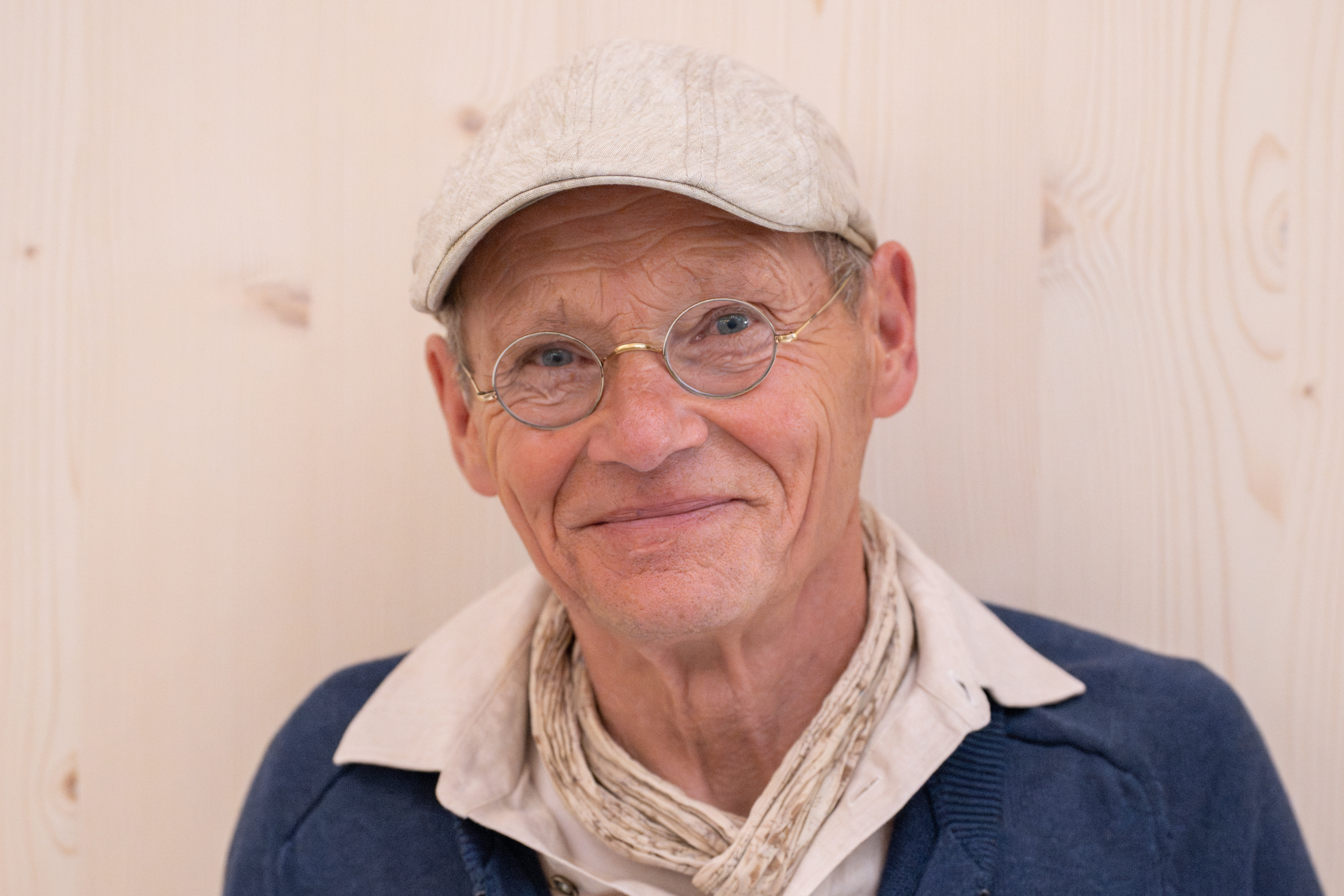
- Bernd Arnold in 2025

Personal information
- Nationality: German
- Born: February 28, 1947 (age 78)
- Occupation(s): Rock climber and mountaineer

Bernd Arnold (born 28 February 1947) is a German rock climber and mountaineer. He is known for more than 900 first ascents in the East German Saxon Switzerland climbing region. During the 1970s and 1980s, he established most of the hardest routes in the region and became one of the most influential German climbers of his era. He is well-known for climbing barefoot, even on very hard routes.

== Climbing career ==
His first remarkable ascent was the Route Zehn (VIIIc) at Meurerturm in 1966, when he was only 19 years old. In 1970 he climbed the Nordwand at the rock tower Schwager in the Schrammsteine area and achieved a difficulty of grade IXb. This might have been the hardest free climbing route in the world at the time. First ascents such as the Nonplusultra (IXb) at Mittlerer Torstein, Talseite (IXb) at Teufelsspitze, and Lineal (IXa) at Meurerturm followed. In 1977 Arnold was the first to climb grade IXc when he achieved his first ascent of Direkte Superlative at Großer Wehlturm.

In the early 1980s, developments in sport climbing pushed into ever harder territories. Inspired by the growing international competition at the top level of the climbing world, Arnold managed to reach the difficulty of Xa in 1982 and Xb in 1983. His first ascents of Barometer für Stimmungen at Heringstein and Garten Eden at Rokokoturm, both Xc, marked the climax of his rock-climbing career in 1986.

After the Peaceful Revolution of 1989, Arnold was able to travel to many mountain regions around the world. During the Cold War era, he was only in a few exceptional cases allowed to pursue climbing and mountaineering outside the Eastern Bloc. Nevertheless, he became close friends with West German climbers Kurt Albert and Wolfgang Güllich, who visited Saxon Switzerland in the early 1980s and managed to repeat some of Arnold's hardest routes. With Kurt Albert he later undertook expeditions to Patagonia and the Karakorum.

Arnold remains an active climber today and is a proponent of reforming the very strict traditional climbing regulations of the Saxon Switzerland area. In 2008, he was awarded an honorary citizenship by his hometown of Hohnstein.

== Personal life ==
Bernd Arnold grew up in the small East German town of Hohnstein, where he still lives today. Arnold is a professional letterpress printer and now owns two mountaineering equipment stores. He also offers climbing courses in his home region. He is married and has one daughter.

== See also ==
- History of rock climbing
- List of first ascents (sport climbing)
