= Saxon Switzerland climbing region =

Climbing area in Germany

Coordinates: 50.916022°N 14.153824°E

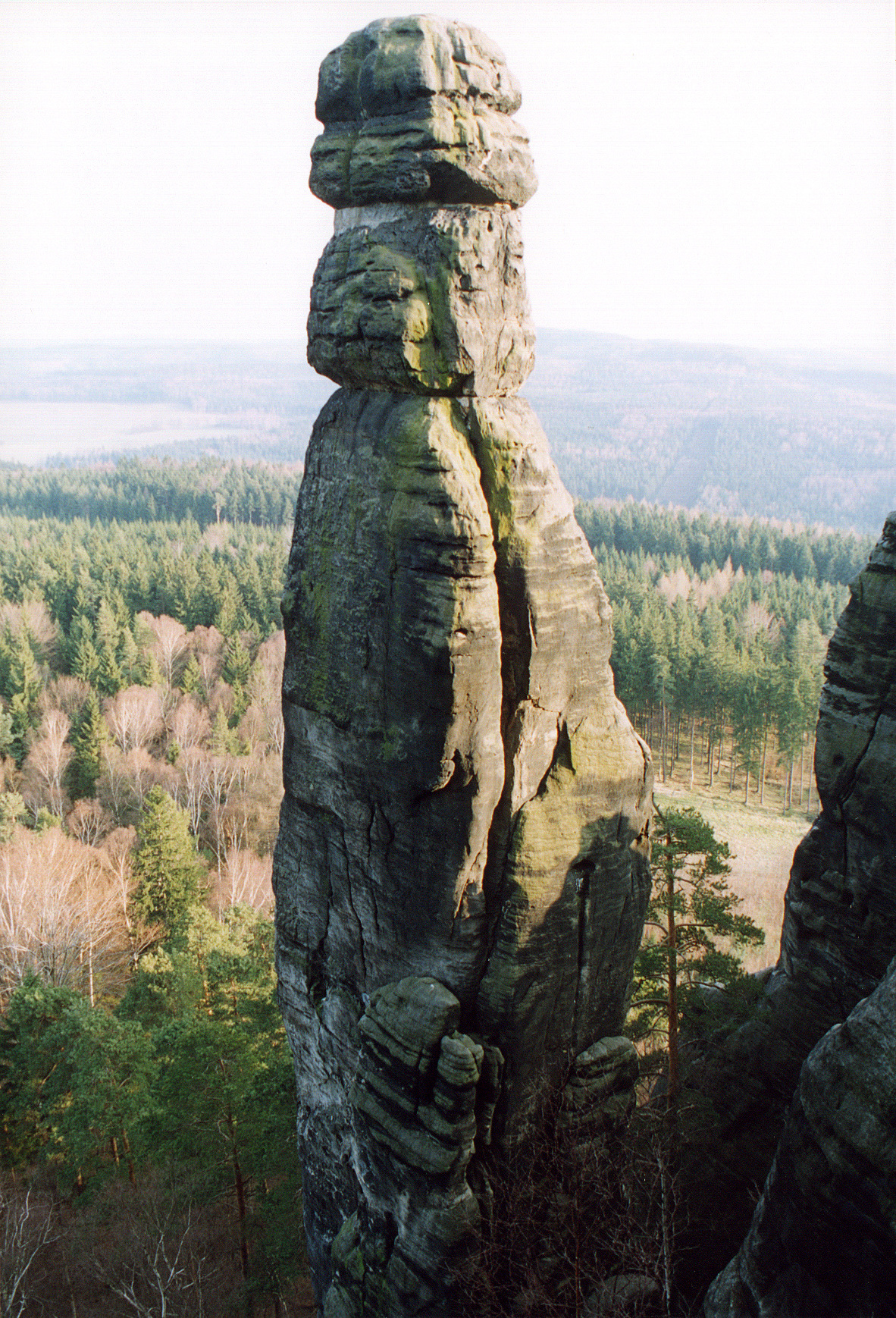
The Barbarine on the Pfaffenstein, first climbed in 1905, out of bounds since 1975

Saxon Switzerland (German: Sächsische Schweiz) is the largest and one of the best-known rock climbing regions in Germany, located in the Free State of Saxony. The region is largely coterminous with the natural region of the same name, Saxon Switzerland, but extends well beyond the territory of the National Park within it. It includes the western part of the Elbe Sandstone Mountains and is the oldest non-Alpine rock climbing region in Germany. Its history of climbing dates back to the first ascent in modern times of the Falkenstein by Bad Schandau gymnasts in 1864. Currently, there are over 1,100 peaks with more than 17,000 climbing routes in the Saxon Switzerland area.

== Climbing ==
The climbing is characterized by a strong traditional climbing ethic and a number of peculiarities rarely found in other climbing regions, or at least not to the same extent. An exception are Czech sandstone climbing regions, where similar rules apply. Climbers must observe the Saxon Climbing Regulations, which were first formulated in 1913 and are binding. The main principles of climbing in Saxon Switzerland are based on the idea of free climbing and a commitment to protecting the soft sandstone, which is prone to erosion and can be easily damaged, especially when wet. This results in specific rules and customs regarding safety equipment and climbing style.

=== Protection ===
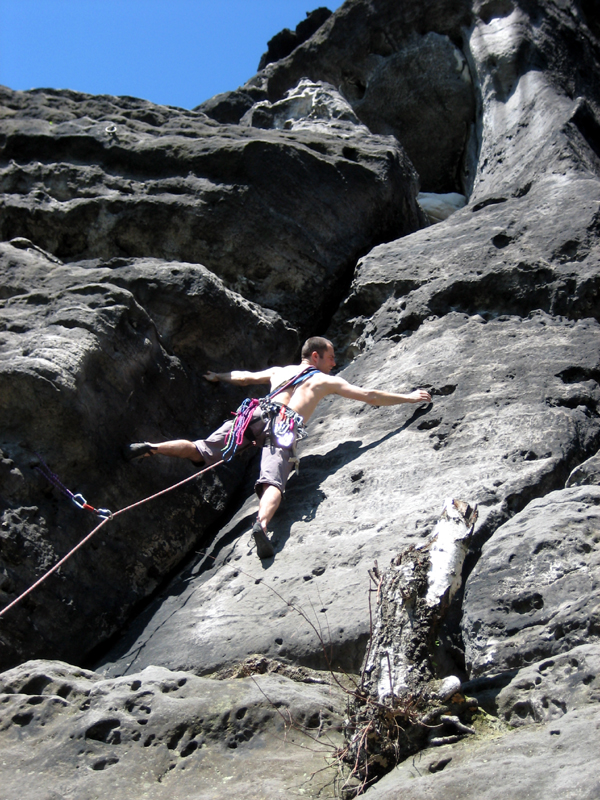
Lead climber at Papststein

The main means of protection are slings which are tied around natural features or threaded through natural holes in the rock. Knotted slings can be firmly placed within cracks, functioning similar to a camming device. Any form of metal protection such as nuts, cams or pitons are forbidden to use as they may damage the rock.

Ring bolts can only be found in routes of the Saxon grade V and higher (with a few exceptions) but are only placed when no other protection is possible. There are usually large distances between rings and routes with only one or two of them are very common. Therefore, climbers often face large runouts and need to rely on slings for protection even in very hard routes.

Only the person who makes the first ascent of a route is allowed to install ring bolts during the climb from the ground up. Bolting a route while hanging from a top rope is not permitted (e.g. top rope climbing). In exceptional cases, later additions of ring bolts are decided by a commission of the Saxon Climbers Federation (SBB) when natural protection features have been destroyed or a route proves to be too dangerous. Bolts may also be placed as belay anchors in multipitch routes.

=== Climbing style ===
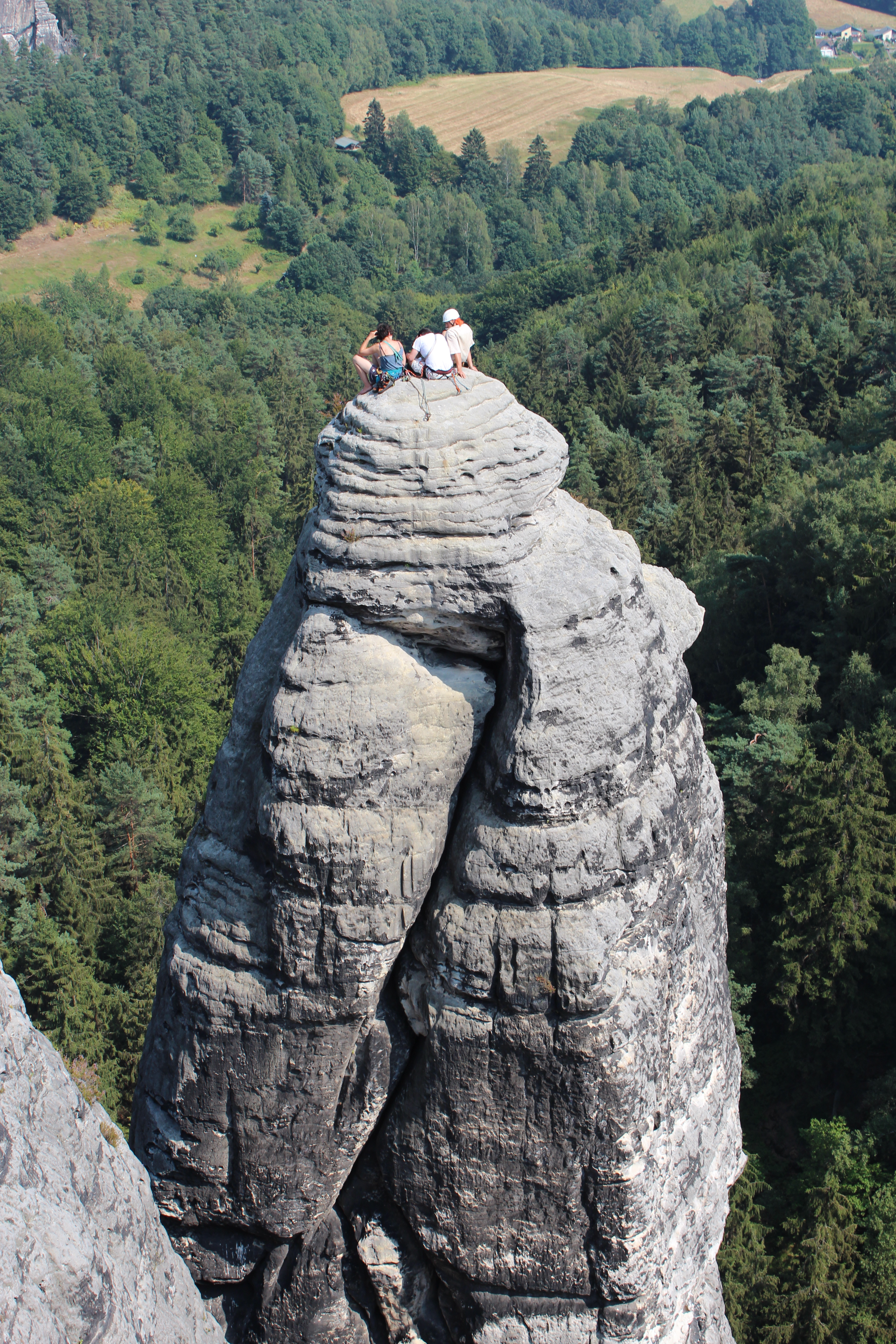
Climbers on the summit of Kleiner Wehlturm near Rathen

The lead climber places all the protection from the ground up. Due to the limited protection, falls should be avoided, especially when relying on slings only. Upon reaching the summit, the leader anchors him- or herself using the abseil ring, a preinstalled anchor bolt or slings, and belays the second and other members of the climbing party from the top. The second removes the protection during their climb. When all members of the climbing party have reached the top, the summit register is signed and all climbers usually rappel. Toproping is generally frowned upon and only allowed when not using abseil rings and it is ensured that the rope can not damage the rock.

The Saxon-Switzerland offers a large variety of single and multipitch routes of all difficulties and techniques such as chimneys, cracks, slabs and face climbing. The sometimes sparse and unusual possibilities of placing protection require practice and not only physical but also mental strength. Climbers should be confident to master a grade before starting a climb because resting on a weighted rope or retreating might not be safe or easy options.

=== Grading system ===
The Saxon-Switzerland has its own Saxon grading system that was developed at the beginning of the 20th century. It uses roman numerals to denote the level of difficulty. Grades of VII and higher are subdivided by the letters a, b, and c. The Saxon Grading System is also used in other parts of East Germany and the Czech Republic. The hardest route in Saxon Switzerland is graded at XIc.

There are also specific grades for horizontal jumps, represented by Arabic numerals ranging from 1 to 7.

Routes that are deemed especially worthwhile are marked with one or two asterisks.

=== Restrictions ===
Climbing is only permitted on designated free-standing rock towers with at least 10 m prominence. An historic exception are three massifs which may be climbed. Almost all summits are furnished with summit registers and abseiling rings. These, like other safety rings, are looked after and maintained by the Saxon Climbers' Federation (SBB).

== Regulations ==
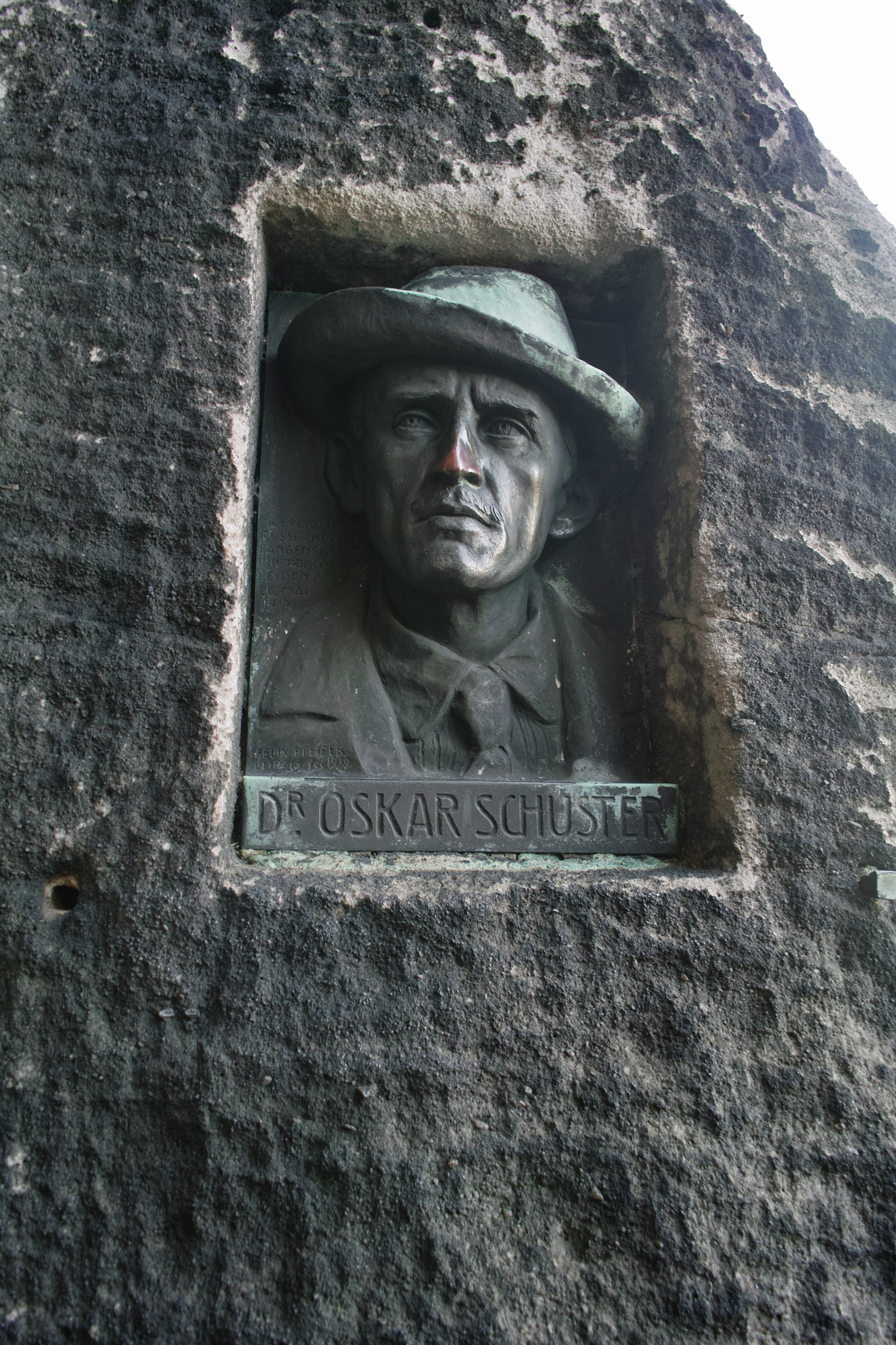
Schuster relief on the Schuster Way on the Falkenstein

Climbing regulations for Saxon Switzerland were first printed in 1913 in a climbing guide published by Rudolf Fehrmann, and have only been slightly amended since. The basic principles had been developed before 1900, mainly by Oscar Schuster. Their main feature is, that artificial aids to rock climbing are not permitted. They, therefore, constitute one of the foundations of the concept of free climbing, which is the most prevalent form of rock climbing today.

The climbing regulations are also part of the mountain sport concept required under the National Parks Ordinance for the Free State of Saxony, which lays down how and to what extent climbing in the Saxon Switzerland National Park may be undertaken.

The most important regulations are:

- Artificial aids are forbidden. The climber is only allowed to use natural hand- and footholds and must use his own bodily strength to climb.
- Ropes, slings, carabiners, etc., may only be used for protection.
- The existing surface of the rock must not be altered (exceptions are safety rings).
- Ring bolts may only be installed by the first person to climb a route. The bolting of subsequent rings is decided by the sub-committee of the SBB responsible.
- The use of chalk or pof is forbidden.
- Nuts, friends and similar aids are banned. Only slings may be used.
- First ascents of a new climbing route may only be attempted from bottom to top. The opening of new routes by driving in pitons "from above" (i.e. by hanging off a rope from the summit or ledge) common in other climbing areas, is forbidden.
- Climbing is forbidden on wet or damp rocks.

In addition, the regulations go on to cover in detail the procedure for first ascents, climbing bans, the scale of climbing grades and conduct when climbing.

== Climbing areas ==
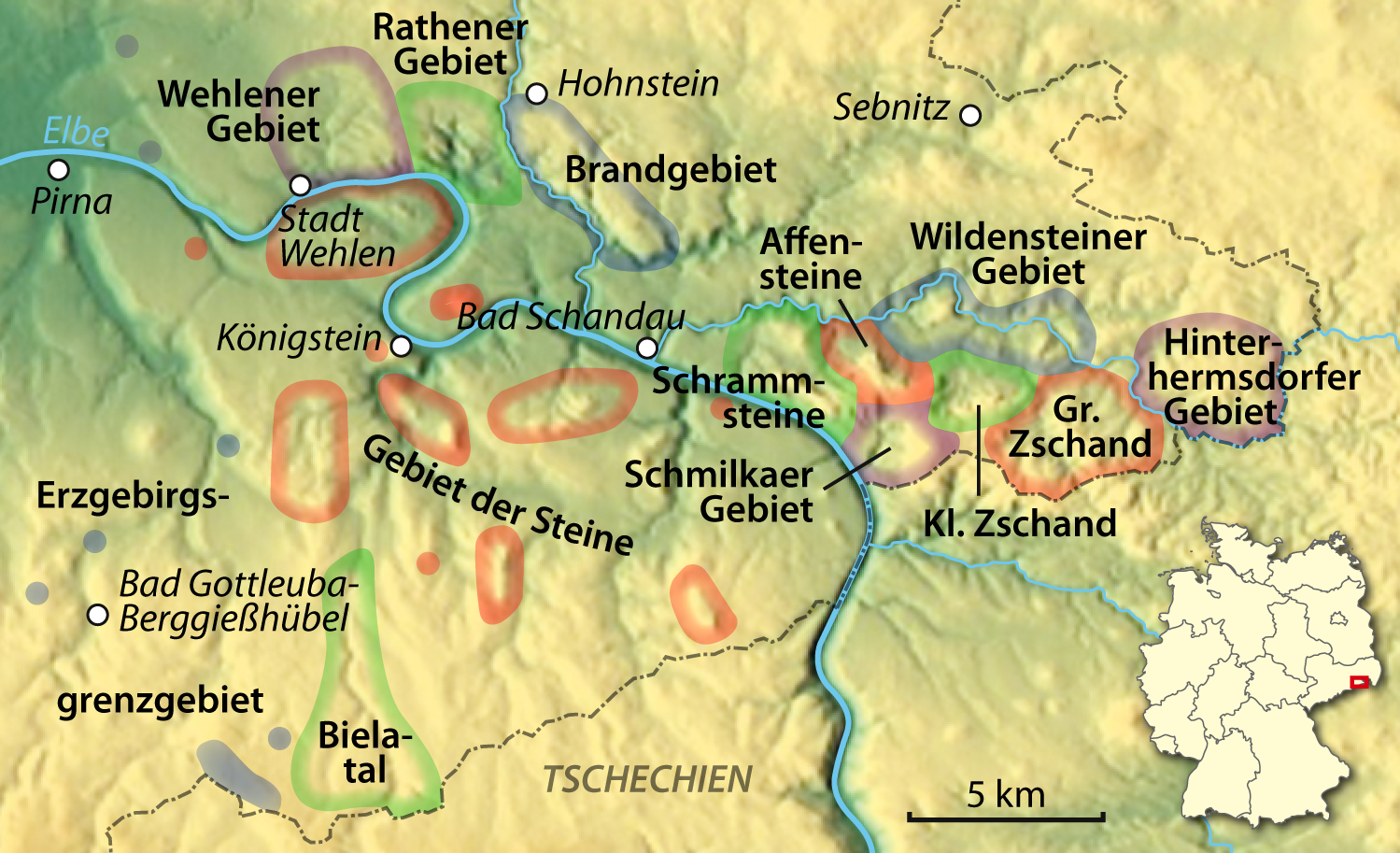
Climbing areas within Saxon Switzerland

The climbing region Saxon Switzerland is divided into the following areas:

- Affensteine
- Bielatal
- Brandgebiet
- Erzgebirgsgrenzgebiet
- Gebiet der Steine
- Großer Zschand
- Hinterhermsdorfer Gebiet
- Kleiner Zschand
- Rathener Gebiet
- Schmilkaer Gebiet
- Schrammsteine
- Wehlener Gebiet
- Wildensteiner Gebiet

== Climbing rocks ==
The following is a selection of climbing rocks in the Saxon Switzerland climbing region:

- Affensteine
- Bärensteine
- Falkenstein
- Frienstein
- Gohrisch
- Lokomotive
- Mönch
- Nonne
- Papststein
- Pfaffenstein
- Rauenstein
- Schwedenturm
- Teufelsturm
- Wartturm
- Zschirnsteine

== Sources ==
- Karl Däweritz: Klettern im sächsischen Fels. 2. erw. Auflage, Sportverlag, Berlin 1986, ISBN 3-328-00097-6.
- Dietmar Heinicke (Hrsg.): Kletterführer Sächsische Schweiz. Berg- & Naturverlag Rölke, Dresden 1999/2003 (6 Bände).
1. Affensteine, Kleiner Zschand. 2002, ISBN 3-934514-05-7.
2. Bielatal, Erzgebirgsgrenzgebiet. 2000, ISBN 3-934514-02-2.
3. Gebiet der Steine. 2001, ISBN 3-934514-03-0
4. Großer Zschand, Wildensteiner Gebiet, Hinterhermsdorfer Gebiet. 2001, ISBN 3-934514-04-9.
5. Schrammsteine, Schmilkaer Gebiet. 1999, ISBN 3-934514-01-4.
6. Wehlener Gebiet, Rathener Gebiet, Brandgebiet. 2003, ISBN 3-934514-06-5.
