= Oliver Perry-Smith =

American mountain climber

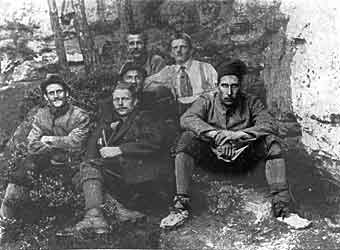
- Oliver Perry-Smith (right), 1907

Personal information
- Born: October 11, 1884 Philadelphia, Pennsylvania, U.S.
- Died: May 13, 1969 (aged 84)

Climbing career
- Type of climber: Mountaineer, rock climber
- First ascents: 32 first ascents
- Known for: More than 90 ascents in Saxon Switzerland

Oliver Perry-Smith (October 11, 1884 in Philadelphia – May 13, 1969) was an American rock climber, mountaineer and skier who moved to Dresden in 1902 and lived in the area until he returned to the USA in 1914.

== Early life and family connections ==
Perry-Smith was "of distinguished ancestry". His father, also called Oliver Perry-Smith (1860-1899), served in the Spanish-American War and died in Havana from complications of typhoid fever. His mother was Katherine Crosby Beale, the daughter of Truxtun Dixon Beale (1820-1870), whose grandfather was Thomas Truxtun, one of the first six commanders that President George Washington appointed to the new United States Navy. His relatives also included the newspaper magnate Edward “Ned” Beale McLean who married Evalyn Walsh McLean, the owner of the Hope diamond.

After his father's death his mother remarried and went to live in Dresden whilst Perry-Smith attended St. Paul's School (as had his father before him). In 1902 he also moved to Dresden where he studied at Dresden's Technische Hochschule (technical university) which later became Dresden University of Technology.

== Climbs in Saxon Switzerland ==
He became well known in the Sächsische Schweiz for the first ascents of major sandstone rock towers such as:

- Schrammtorwächter (VI) in 1905
- Kanzelturm (VI) in 1905
- Teufelsturm (VIIb) in 1906 (at 5.8+ - with a shoulder stand - a very difficult rock climb)

and first ascents of several climbing routes that are still very popular today, e. g.:

- Spannagelturm Perrykante VIIb in 1906
- Falkenstein Südriss (VIIa) in 1913
- Daxenstein Klavier (VIIa) in 1913
- Daxenstein Perryriss (VIIb) in 1913

(All grades Saxon rating)

Details of his early first ascents on the sandstone spires are included in the climbing guide published by his friend and regular climbing partner Rudolf Fehrmann in 1908, entitled "Der Bergsteiger in der Sächsischen Schweiz".

In total "he made more than 90 ascents in Saxon Switzerland, 33 of which are rated VI or above; there were 32 first ascents, 13 solo climbs and 36 additional ones on which he led".

== Alps ==
On a trip to the Dolomite Alps in 1908 he and Rudolf Fehrmann made a number of first ascents.

- The most famous is the "Fehrmann Corner" (in German, Fehrmannverschneidung), V−, on Campanile Basso, SW face (also known as "Guglia di Brenta", in Brenta group in Dolomites, on 28 August 1908). Despite its name, this 300 m (980 ft) long route was led by Perry-Smith (because, as explained in biographical article in AAJ 1964, "Fehrmann was the first to sign the summit book and later he was assumed by later climbers to be a leader").
- A few weeks earlier they had made the first ascent of the north face of Cima Piccola di Lavaredo, 350 m (1,150 ft) V, (in German: Kleine Zinne), 15 August 1908.

He was also active in the Western Alps, his first visit there was in 1903 when he climbed with Josef Knubel of St Niklaus (who did not attain his guide’s license until the following year). In 1909 he joined forces with Geoffrey Winthrop Young, who described him as "one of the finest of transatlantic climbers”, together with Knubel they made the first ascent of the north-east buttress of the Weisshorn on 31 August, that route is still graded as TD. His "repeated ascents include also Weisshorn, Matterhorn, Dent Blanche, Zinalrothorn, Wellenkuppe, Obergabelhorn, Kleine Zinne".

== Skiing ==
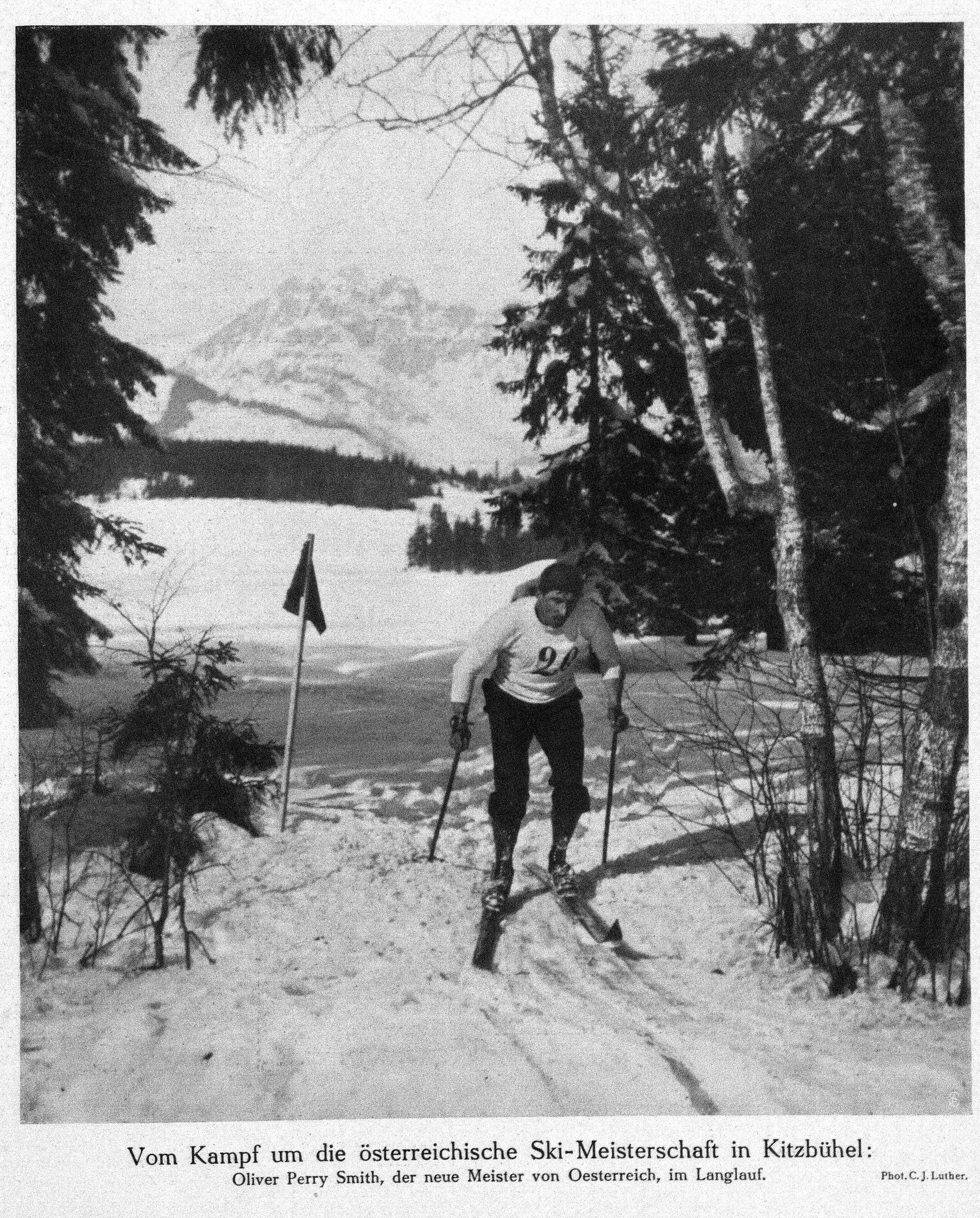
The cover photo of 'de Sport im Bild', 13 February 1914, with Oliver Perry-Smith competing in the Austrian langlauf event at Kitzbühel

Beside his achievements in climbing, he was an accomplished skier who competed in both cross-country-skiing and ski-jumping and won the 8th Austrian ski championship held in 1914.

== Personal life ==
In October 1911 he married his wife Agnes (née Adolph) at Schreiberhau (a town which is now in Poland), where their first son was born, also named Oliver Perry-Smith. Perry-Smith returned to USA with his family in September 1914 and they had 3 more sons. All of the four boys were skiing and ski jumping from an early age and the youngest, Crosby, was part of the 1952 US Olympic Ski Jumping Team in Oslo, Norway, 1952. Another son, Dixon, married the world figure skating champion Hedy Stenuf.

Oliver Perry-Smith was elected an Honorary Member of the American Alpine Club.

There are a number of anecdotes depicting Perry-Smith as a rather unusual character:

- When people doubted his ascent of 'Perryriss', he climbed that route again and wrote in big letters 'Perry' on the rock. (it can still be read today).
- He owned a Bugatti race car and got in trouble with the police several times for driving fast and hazardously.
- He was once arrested and then committed for disturbing the peace by threatening people with a pistol in Bad Schandau (a small town close to the sandstone towers that he knew so well).

== See also ==
- Rudolf Fehrmann
