= Kurt Albert =

German rock climber

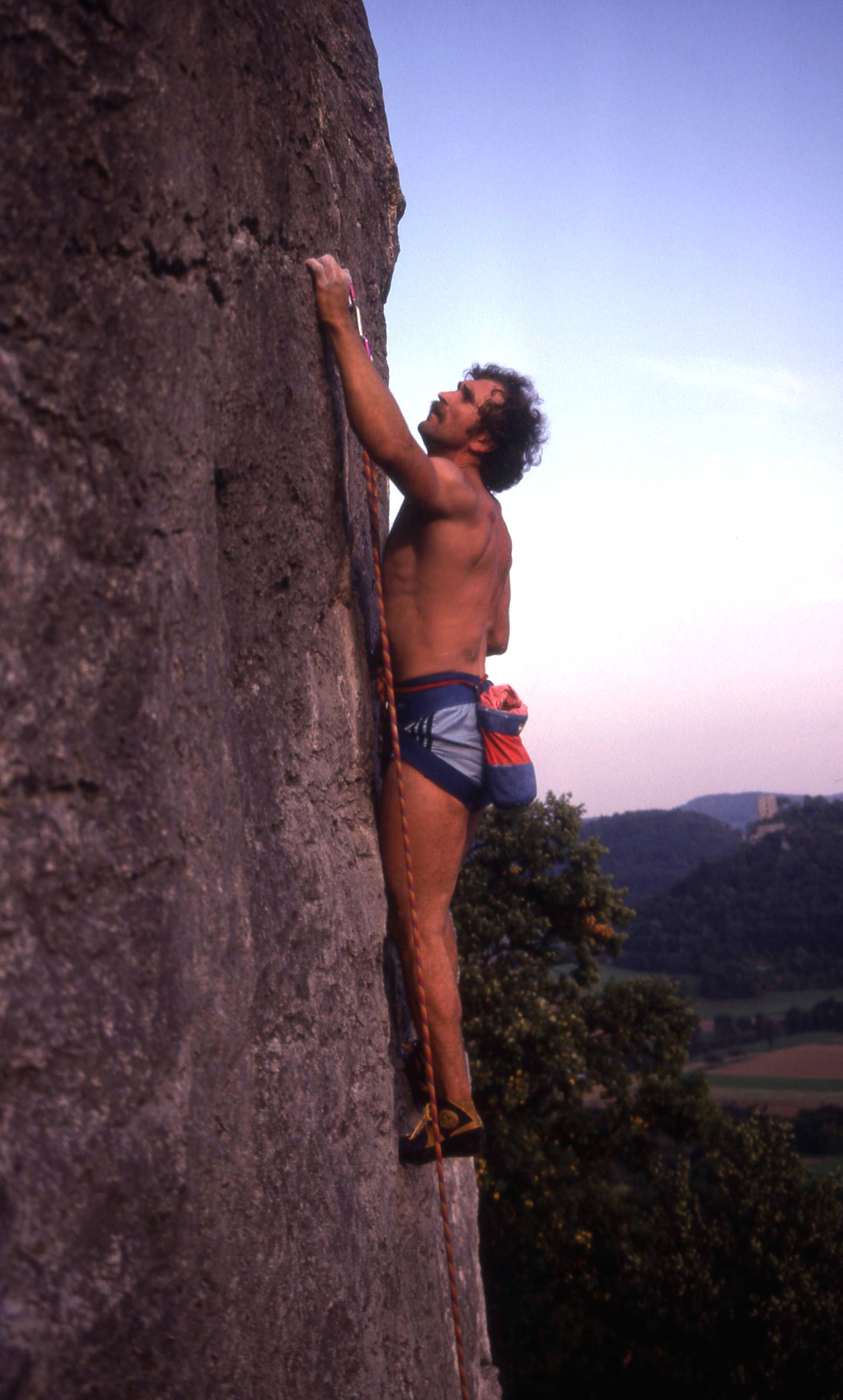
- Albert in 1985
- Born: January 28, 1954; Nuremberg, Germany
- Died: September 28, 2010 (aged 56); Erlangen, Bavaria, Germany
- Occupations: Climber and photographer
- Known for: Iconic figure in the history of the free climbing movement.

Kurt Albert (January 28, 1954 – September 28, 2010) was a German climber and photographer, and the pioneer of the redpoint concept in free climbing. He started climbing at the age of 14. Before he committed himself to a career in climbing in 1986, he was a mathematics and physics teacher.

== Climbing career ==
At the age of seventeen, he climbed the Walker Spur in the Grandes Jorasses, and one year later he climbed the north face of the Eiger. After a visit to the Saxon Switzerland climbing area in Saxony, Germany in 1973 he recognized the potential of free climbing. He started to free climb in his home climbing area, the Frankenjura. On the routes that he would now try to ascend while free climbing, he would—in between attempts—paint a red 'X' on the rocks near pitons he did not need as holds or steps. Once he could place a red 'X' on all the pitons and hooks in the route, and was thus able to free climb the entire route, he would paint a red dot at the base of the route. From this comes the English term "redpoint", which is derived from the German Rotpunkt, meaning "redpoint". In many ways, this was the origin of the free climbing movement that led to the development of sport climbing some years later.

== Death ==
Albert was severely injured in a climbing accident on September 26, 2010. He fell 18 metres (59 ft) while taking pictures at via ferrata Höhenglücksteig (near Hirschbach, Bavaria) and died two days later while hospitalised in Erlangen.

== Bibliography ==
- Kn Tr Benoit (Herausgeber) (2005). Kurt Albert. tmms-Verlag. ISBN 3-930650-15-0.
- Albert, Kurt (2005). Fight gravity. Klettern im Frankenjura. tmms-verlag. ISBN 3-930650-16-9.
