= Saxon Climbers' Federation =

Now part of the German Alpine Club

Logo Sächsischer Bergsteigerbund since 2012

The Saxon Climbers' Federation (German: Sächsischer Bergsteigerbund, SBB) is a federation of individual members, small and large clubs and is the largest climbing association in the region for climbing activities in Saxon Switzerland and the surrounding area in eastern Germany. It is also the largest sports association in Saxony. The goal of the SBB is to support climbing and Alpine sports of all types in the Alps and the German Central Uplands. As the regional sponsor for the Saxon Switzerland climbing region within the German Alpine Club (DAV) the federation is first and foremost involved in Saxon Switzerland, "Saxon Climbing" as a sport and technique, and nature conservation in the Saxon Switzerland National Park.

== History ==
The SBB was founded on 1 March 1911. One of its first members was Rudolf Fehrmann. Like all German clubs the SBB was banned in 1945 and could not pursue its activities in the post-war years and in East Germany. On 21 December 1989 the SBB was reformed and, in 1990, became a section of the German Alpine Club.
