= Alpawand =

Rock face on the Reiter Alps, Germany

Coordinates: 47°36′32″N 12°46′07″E

The Alpawand (1,671 m) is the tallest rock face on the northwestern side of the Reiter Alps with height of over 600 m.

It is particularly interesting to climbers; although the summit itself is an unimposing rise, covered in Mountain Pine, on an extension of the Großes Häuselhorn. In the central section of the face there are several classic Alpine climbing routes, that are rarely attempted. On the left-hand side there have been several worthwhile Alpine sports climbing routes, established in 2002, that have rapidly become popular. The first and best-known of these routes is the Water Symphony (Wassersymphonie).

It was first climbed in September 1951 by Toni Dürnberger, Sepp Schmiderer and Hans Herbst.
