= Free climbing =

Climbing without using aid

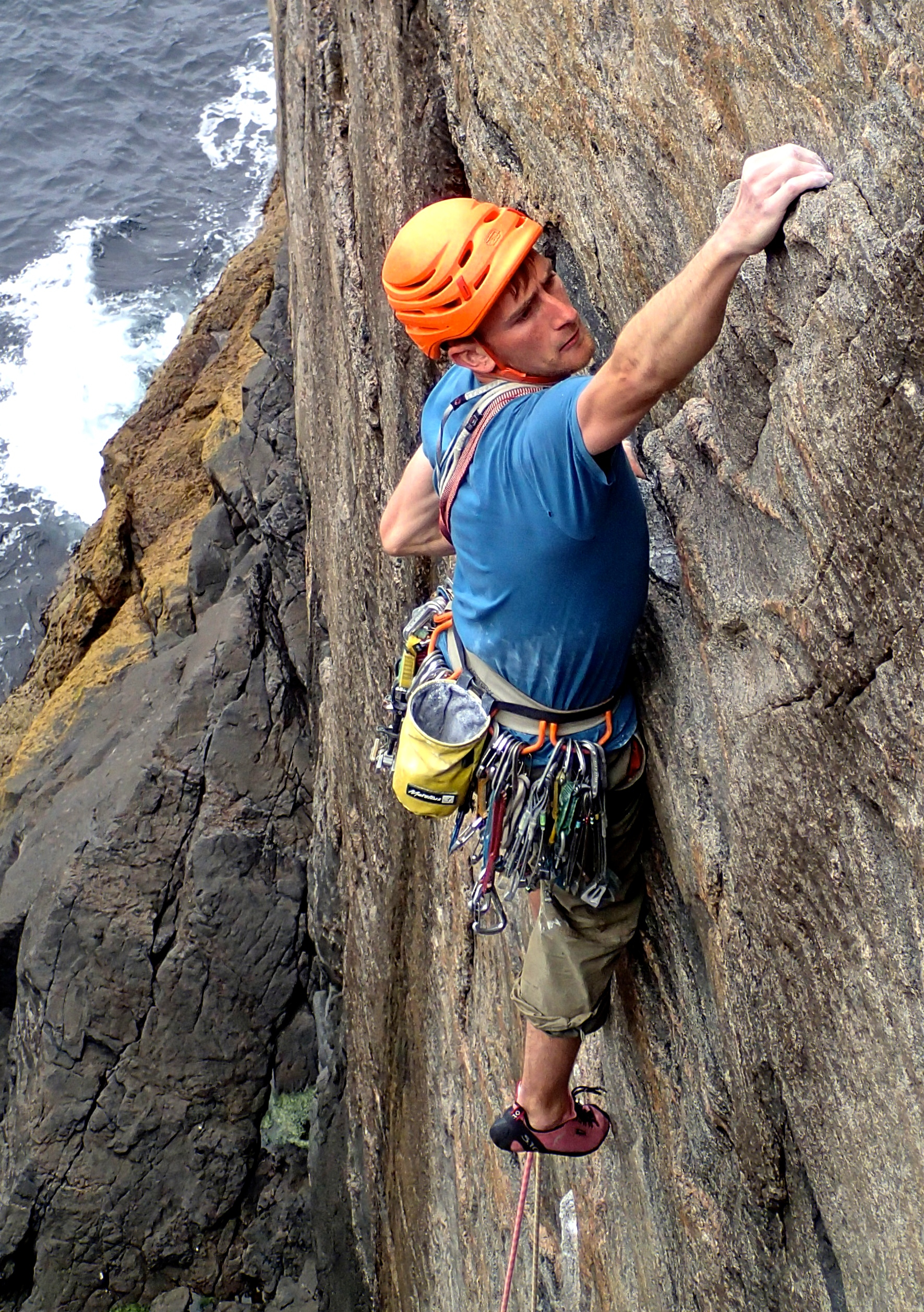
Climber free climbing Sugar Cane Country (E4 6a, in the Hebrides) in traditional climbing style (i.e., with climbing protection equipment).

Free climbing is a form of rock climbing in which the climber can use rock-climbing equipment for their protection, but not as an artificial aid to help them in ascending a climbing route. Free climbing, therefore, cannot use any of the mechanical tools that are widely used in aid climbing to help the climber overcome the obstacles they encounter while ascending a route (e.g., aiders or skyhooks). The development of free climbing was a transformational moment in the history of rock climbing, including the concept and definition of what determined a first free ascent (or FFA) of a climbing route by a climber.

Free climbing can be performed in several different rock-climbing formats that vary with the type of climbing protection which the free-climber used. For example, free climbing can be done as lead climbing in either a traditional climbing style (temporary and removable climbing protection) or a sport climbing style (permanently fixed in-situ climbing protection). Free climbing can also be performed as bouldering or as free solo climbing—both of which use no climbing protection whatsoever. Free climbing is sometimes misunderstood as relating only to the formats of free-solo climbing or of solo climbing, which is not correct.

== History ==
The free climbing movement was an important development in the history of rock climbing. In 1911, Austrian climber Paul Preuss started what became known as the Mauerhakenstreit (or "piton dispute"), by advocating for a transition to "free climbing" via a series of essays and articles in the German Alpine Journal where he defined "artificial aid" and proposed 6 rules of free climbing including the important rule 4: "The piton is an emergency aid and not the basis of a system of mountaineering". In 1913, German climber Rudolf Fehrmann published the second edition of Der Bergsteiger in der Sächsischen Schweiz (or The Climber in Saxon Switzerland), which included the first binding rules for climbing in the area to protect the soft sandstone rock. The rules said that only natural holds were allowed, and those "rules for free climbing" are in still use today.

In 1975, German climber Kurt Albert painted his first "Rotpunkt" (or redpoint) on the base of the aid climb Adolf Rott Ged.-Weg (V+/A1), in the Frankenjura, signifying he had "free climbed" it as a redpoint (i.e., after many failed attempts); the redpoint became the accepted definition of what constituted a "first free ascent".

=== First free ascent ===
The first "free climb" of a climbing route is known as the first free ascent, or FFA, and is chronicled by climbing journals and guide books. They also chronicle whether the "free climb" was done onsight (i.e. first try without any prior information), flashed (i.e., first try with prior information), or redpointed (i.e., completed after a first failed attempt). FFAs that create new grade milestones are important events in climbing history.

=== French free climbing ===
The derived term French free climbing, refers to the French lead climbing technique of "pulling upward" on pieces of in-situ climbing protection equipment (e.g., quickdraws on bolted routes or SLCDs on traditional climbing routes), as a source of aid in ascending the climbing route. It is equivalent to an A0-graded aid climbing technique and is typically used on longer big wall climbing or alpine climbing routes where it is important that the climber(s) progress efficiently and not get overly delayed on a specific section.

Despite the name, 'French free climbing' is not considered 'free climbing' per se, and a climber that uses the technique could not claim a 'first free ascent' of a new route.

== Types ==
Various forms of free climbing

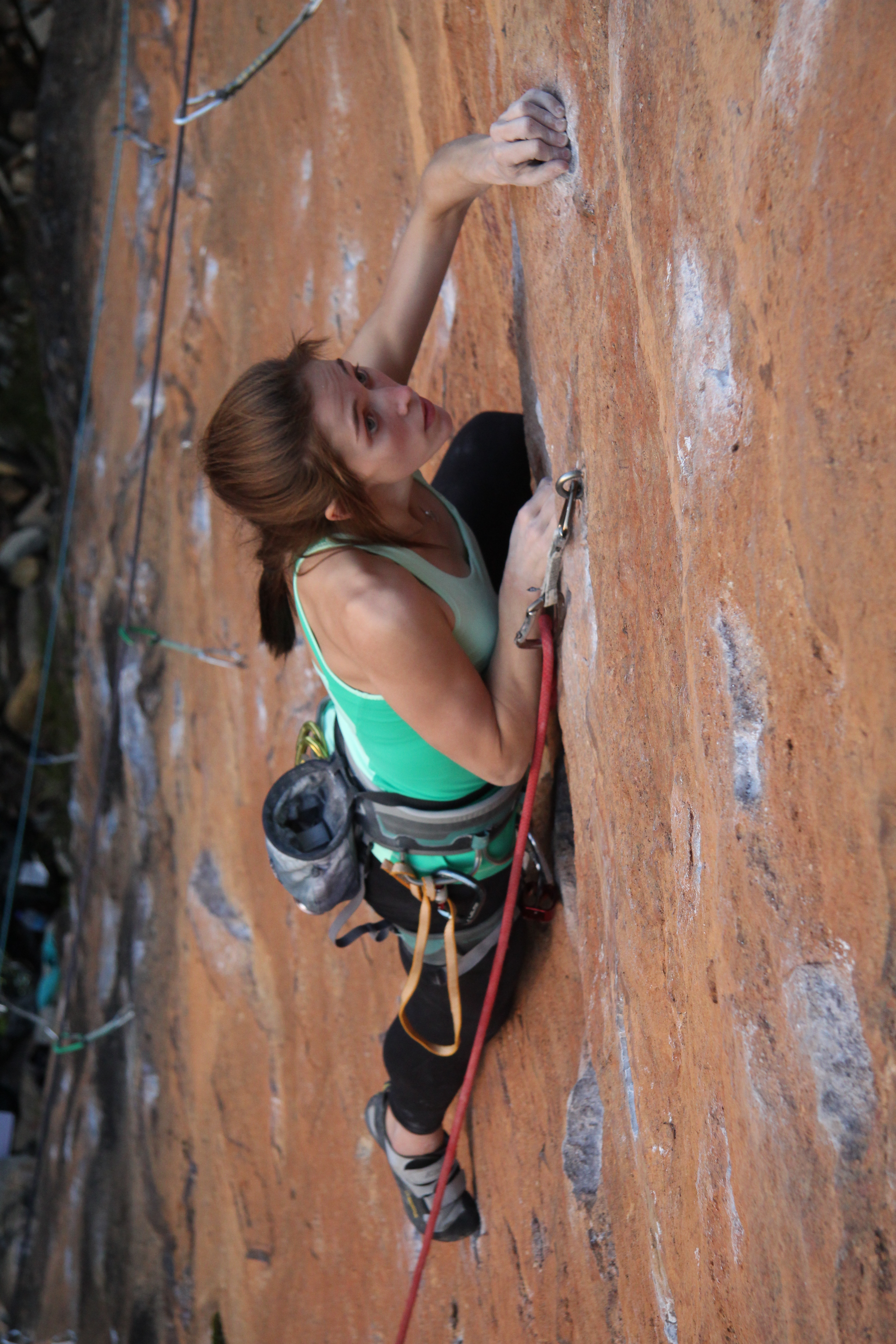
Leading a sport climb

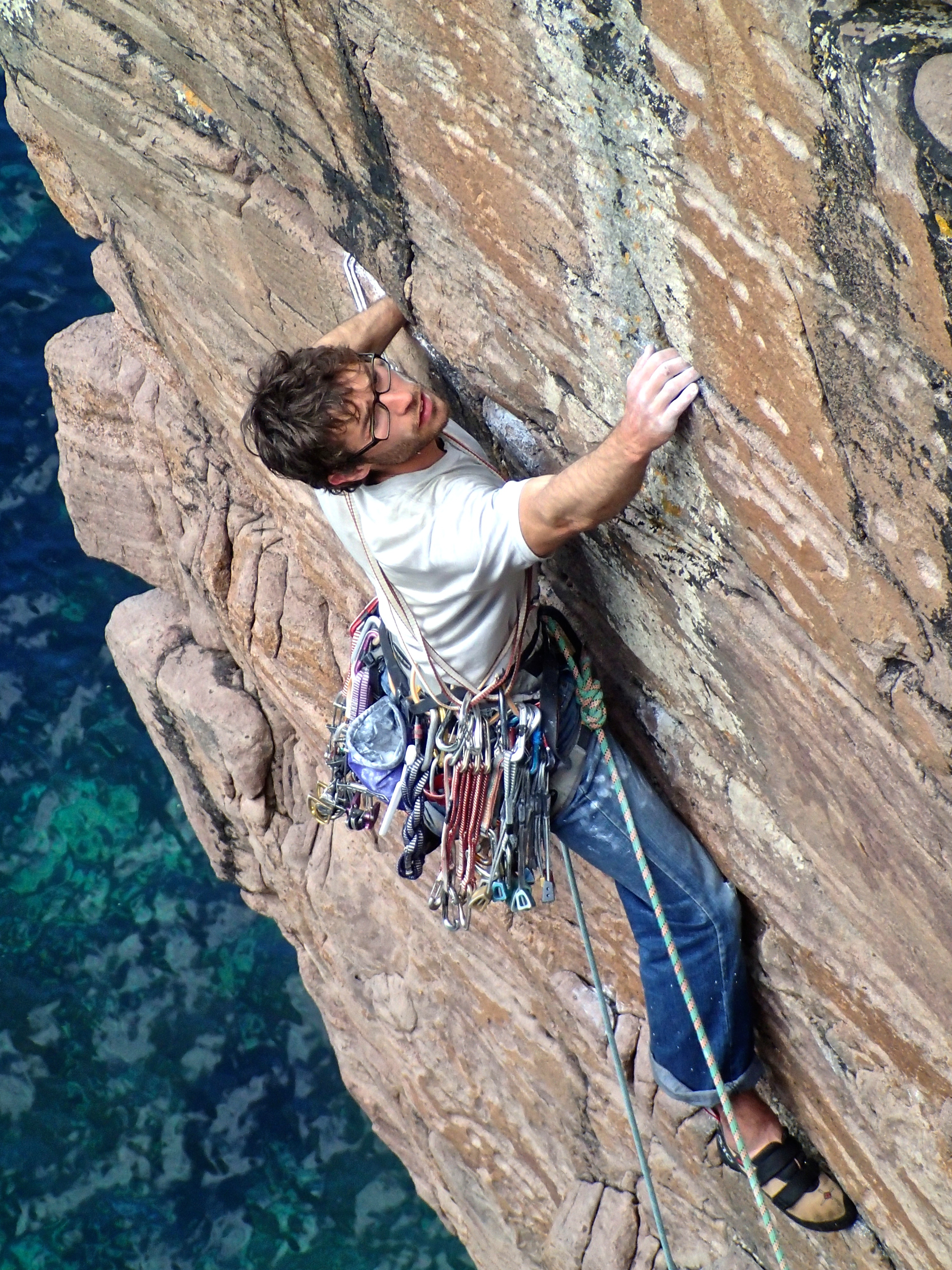
Leading a traditional climb

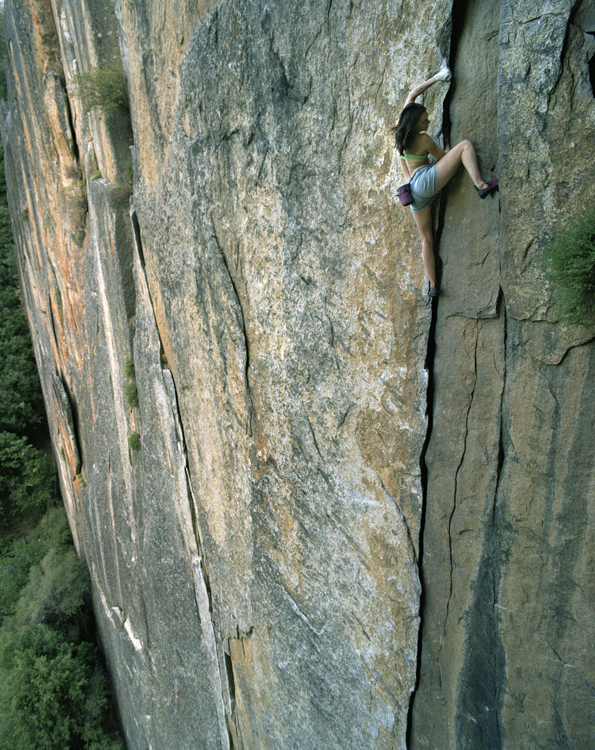
Free solo climbing

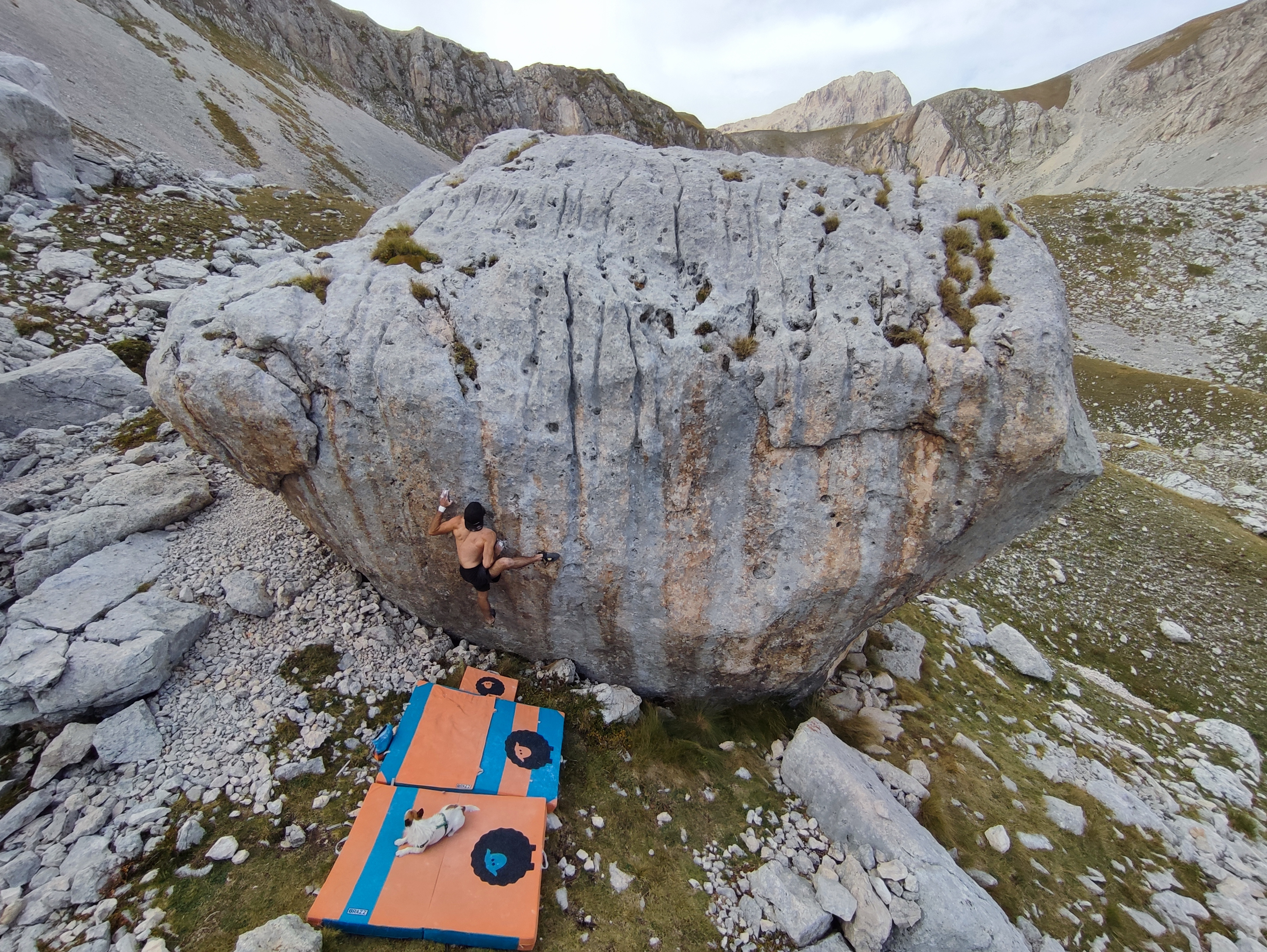
Bouldering

Free climbing means using no form of artificial or mechanical aid to help progression in ascending a route. Even the act of pulling on the climbing protection equipment as employed in 'French free climbing' (either placed by the climber while climbing or already in situ with pre-placed bolts) is considered aid climbing and carries an aid climbing grade of A0.

Free climbing can be performed in a variety of types of climbing, most importantly:

- Traditional climbing, where temporary climbing protection equipment is used and placed by the climber as they ascend the route, but it is not for any form of artificial aid in upward progression on the climbing route.
- Sport climbing, where pre-placed fixed bolts are used for climbing protection but, again, not for any form of aid in upward progression on the climbing route.
- Bouldering, where no forms of mechanical devices are used (even for protection).
- Free solo climbing, where, as with bouldering, no forms of mechanical devices are used.

== Misunderstandings ==
Free climbing has been called "rock climbing's most commonly mistaken term", with problems including the following:

- Incorrectly assuming that "free climbing" always means solo climbing, i.e., that a climber must always be alone and without any partner. Free climbing in traditional climbing and sport climbing uses a supporting belayer.
- Incorrectly assuming that "free climbing" always means free soloing, i.e., that a climber must never use any climbing protection equipment. Free climbing in traditional climbing and sport climbing uses climbing protection (but not to aid progression).
- Incorrectly assuming that "free climbing" always means onsighting or flashing, i.e., that a climber must always climb the route on first attempt. Free climbing in traditional climbing and sport climbing also uses the 'redpoint' as a definition of a first free ascent.

Free climbing is related to but separate from the broader climbing topic area of clean climbing; however, clean climbing does not support the use of bolted sport climbing routes on external natural rock and so redpointed first free ascents on bolted routes are not advocated.

== See also ==
- Free solo climbing
- Rope solo climbing
- Solo climbing
