= Schwedenturm =

Sandstone rock climbing face, Germany

Coordinates: 50°58′11.3916″N 14°4′29.34″E

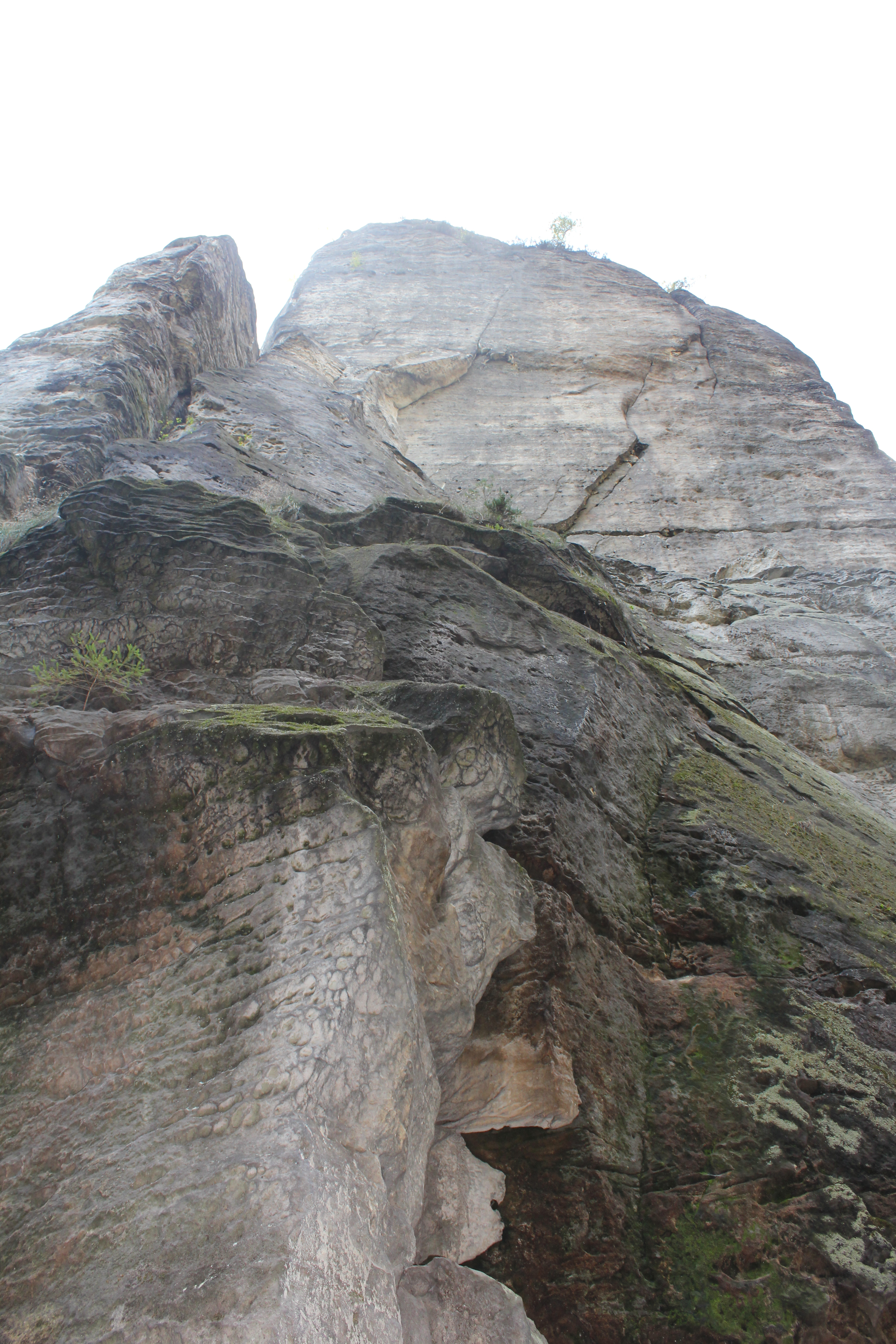
The Schwedenturm's valley side.

The Schwedenturm ("Sweden Tower") in East Germany is a 35-metre-high rock formation made of sandstone in the hills of Saxon Switzerland near the spa town of Rathen and the Bastei rocks.
