= Climbing peak =

Mountain or hill peak or a rock formation that has to be ascended by climbing

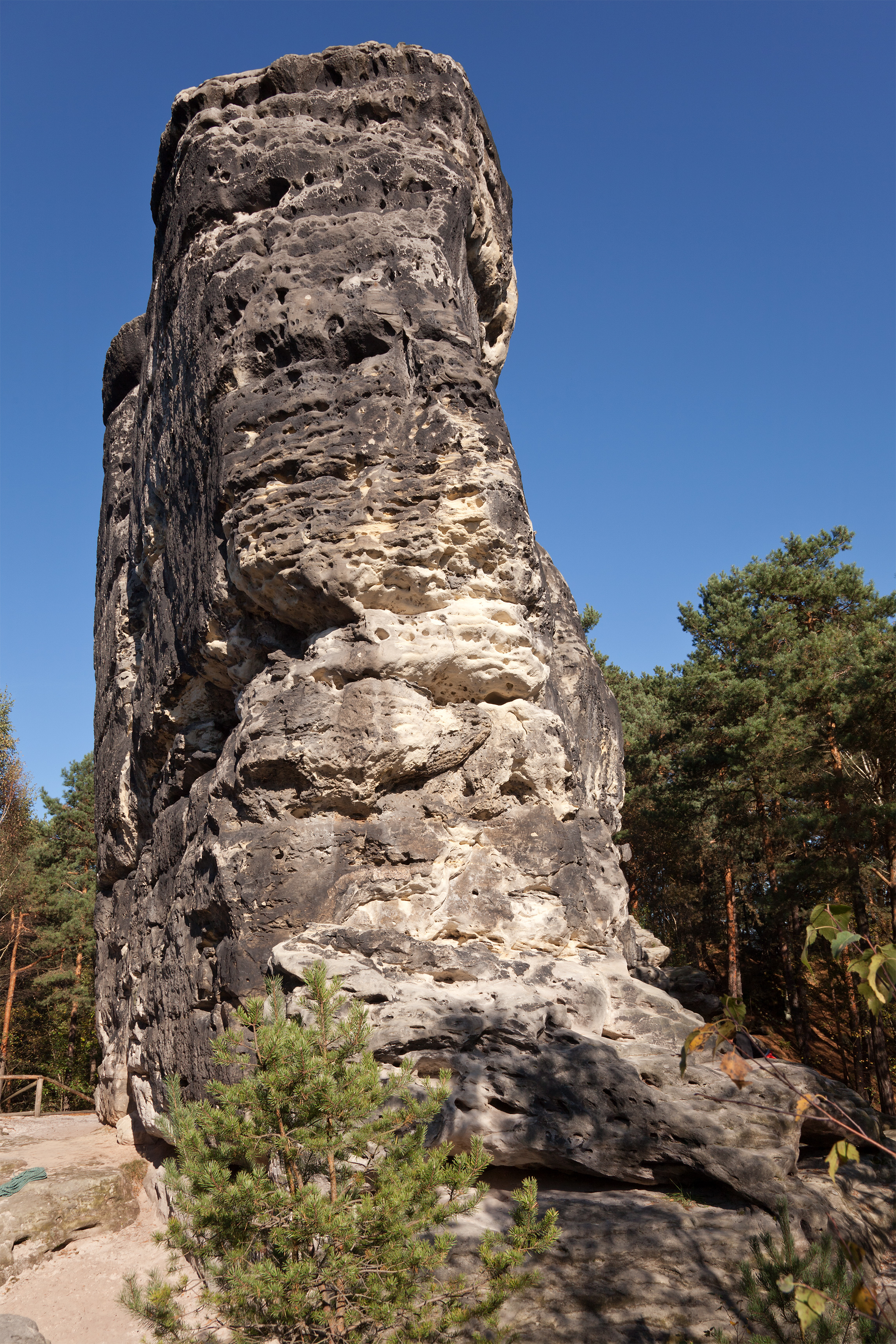
Nonne" rock in Saxon Switzerland

A climbing peak (Note: See e.g. Kelsey (2013): "...features that make Arrowhead the Peak Lake's best climbing peak.") (German: Klettergipfel) may refer to a mountain or hill peak or a rock formation that has to be ascended by climbing. The term is common in Germany where it is specifically used of free-standing rock formations in the climbing regions of Saxon Switzerland, Zittau Mountains and other nearby ranges in the German Central Uplands that can only be summited via climbing routes of at least grade I on the UIAA scale or by jumping from nearby rocks or massifs. As a general rule, they must have a topographic prominence of at least 10 metres to qualify. In Saxon Switzerland the Saxon Climbing Regulations do not require any minimum height, but define climbing peaks as

free-standing rocks that […] can only be ascending by a climb, assault (Überfall), crossing (Übertritt) or jump from nearby rocks […].

Another requirement is its recognition by the responsible sub-committee of the Saxon Climbers' Federation (SBB) and the responsible conservation authorities. For hikers these authorized summits may often be recognised by the presence of a summit register and abseiling anchor points.

In other climbing areas, such as those in Bohemian Switzerland, there are other exceptions. There, climbing peaks only need to have a significant rock face - the lowest side of which has to be less than 10 m high, but at least 6 m high.

== Bibliography ==
- Kelsey, Joe (2013). Climbing and Hiking in the Wind River Mountains. Gulford, CT: Globe Pequot.
