= Rudolf Fehrmann =

German rock climber

Personal information
- Born: 22 June 1886
- Died: 6 March 1948 (aged 61)

Climbing career
- Type of climber: rock climbing
- First ascents: Barbarine; Höllenhund; Schwedenturm

Rudolf Fehrmann (22 June 1886 – 6 March 1948) was a German climber. He was a pioneer rock climber at the Elbe Sandstone Mountains near Dresden.

== Early life ==
Fehrmann was born on 22 June 1886 on a German ship, the Spain, crossing the Atlantic whist his parents were travelling to America. He was a student at Wettinger Gymnasium in Dresden and studied law at Leipzig University.

== Climbing career ==
He began climbing at the age of 17 and was soon at the leading edge of the fledgling sport. Early on, Fehrmann exerted leadership in both climbing ethics and environmental protection. He imagined the purest of climbing routes as "great lines", ascending directly up steep faces and cracks and sometimes presenting considerable difficulties, and he encouraged the use of rope-soled slippers and a minimum of metal protective devices in order to avoid destroying the fragile rock.

In 1903, Fehrmann began climbing on the Schrammsteine rocks. Before long, he became one of the best mountain climbers in Saxon Switzerland and ascended a number of important climbing peaks. Among his 'firsts' were, in 1904, the Chinesische Turm (Alter Weg, Saxon grade V), in 1905, the Barbarine (grade VI), the Höllenhund (grade V(VIIa)) and the Schwedenturm (grade V). Among his other firsts, were the Fehrmannweg route (VIIa) on the Mönch in 1904 and the Südriss (VIIb) on the Dreifingerturm in the Schrammsteine in 1906. He and Oliver Perry-Smith, an American college student and fellow climber living in Dresden, became as close as brothers and formed a team which pushed the limits of risk and difficulty on the steep sandstone spires, making many first ascents.

Fehrmann also climbed in the Alps and Dolomites. During a visit to the Dolomites with Perry-Smith he made a number of significant first ascents which included:

- The 300 m (980 ft) long "Fehrmann Corner" (in German, Fehrmannverschneidung), V−, on Campanile Basso, SW face (also known as "Guglia di Brenta", in Brenta group in Dolomites, on 28 August 1908).
- A few weeks earlier they had made the first ascent of the north face of Cima Piccola di Lavaredo, 350 m (1,150 ft) V, (in German: Kleine Zinne), 15 August 1908.

In 1908, he published a climbing guide for the sandstone spires near Dresden, his favorite area, entitled "Der Bergsteiger in der Sächsischen Schweiz".

== Later life ==
Fehrmann joined the NSDAP in its early stages, and became a Party functionary. As a lawyer, he served during World War II as a military judge, and passed at least one death sentence on a deserter. He was able, during this time, to work out accessibility issues regarding the rocks along the Elbe, assisting the climbing community.

He was captured at the end of the war and interned in Camp Fünfeichen, an NKVD prisoner camp, and in 1948 he died at the age of 61 in the NKVD camp.

== See also ==
- Oliver Perry-Smith
- History of rock climbing

== Literature ==
- A. Goldhammer & M. Wachtler (1936). "Bergsteigen in Sachsen", Dresden
- Hans Pankotsch (2011). "Rudolf Fehrmann (1886–1948) – Aus dem Leben eines bedeutenden sächsischen Bergsteigers". Saxon Mountaineering Association, Dresden
