= Mesa =

Elevated area of land with a flat top and sides, usually much wider than buttes

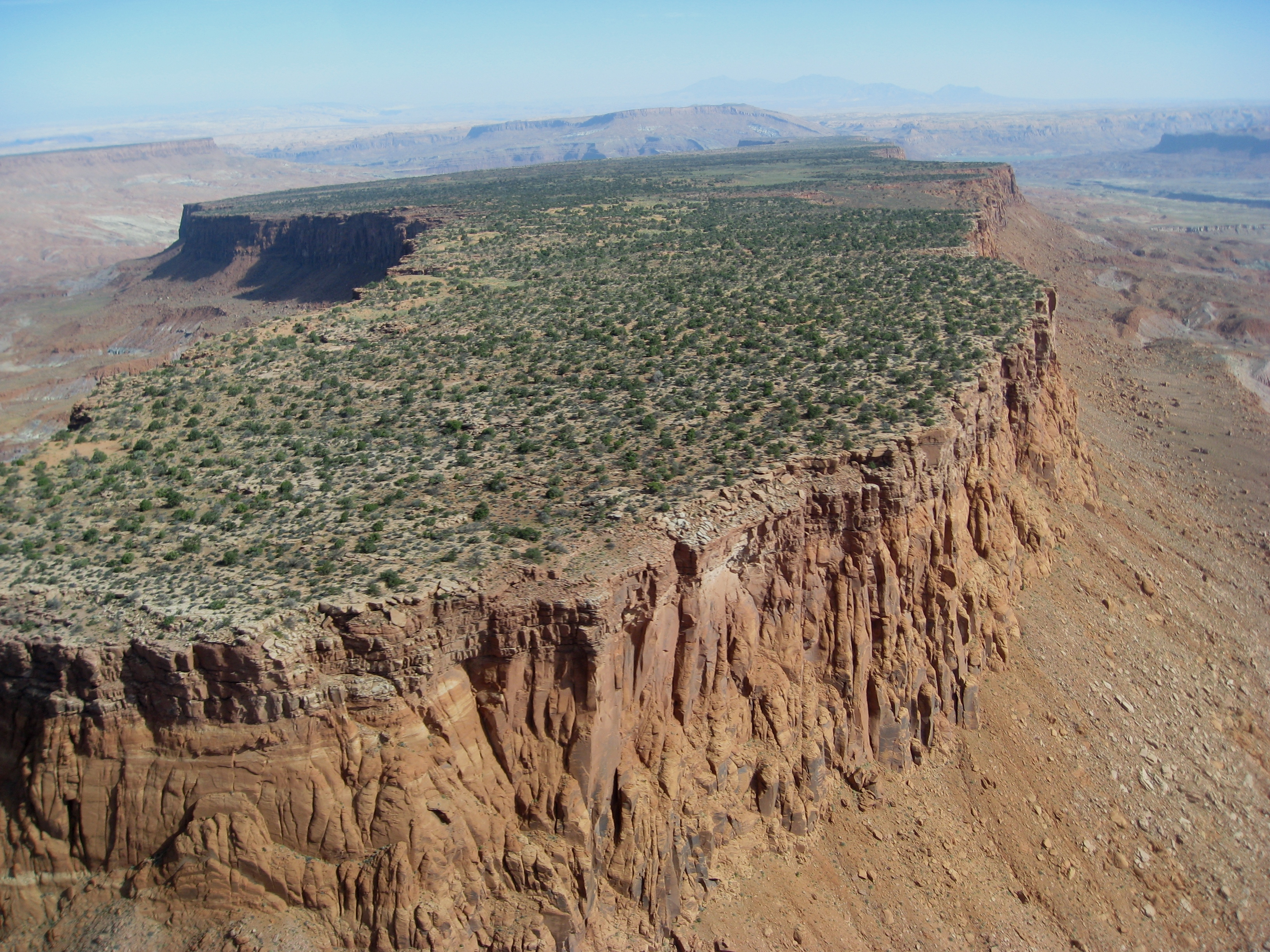
Aerial view of mesas in Monument Valley, on the Colorado Plateau

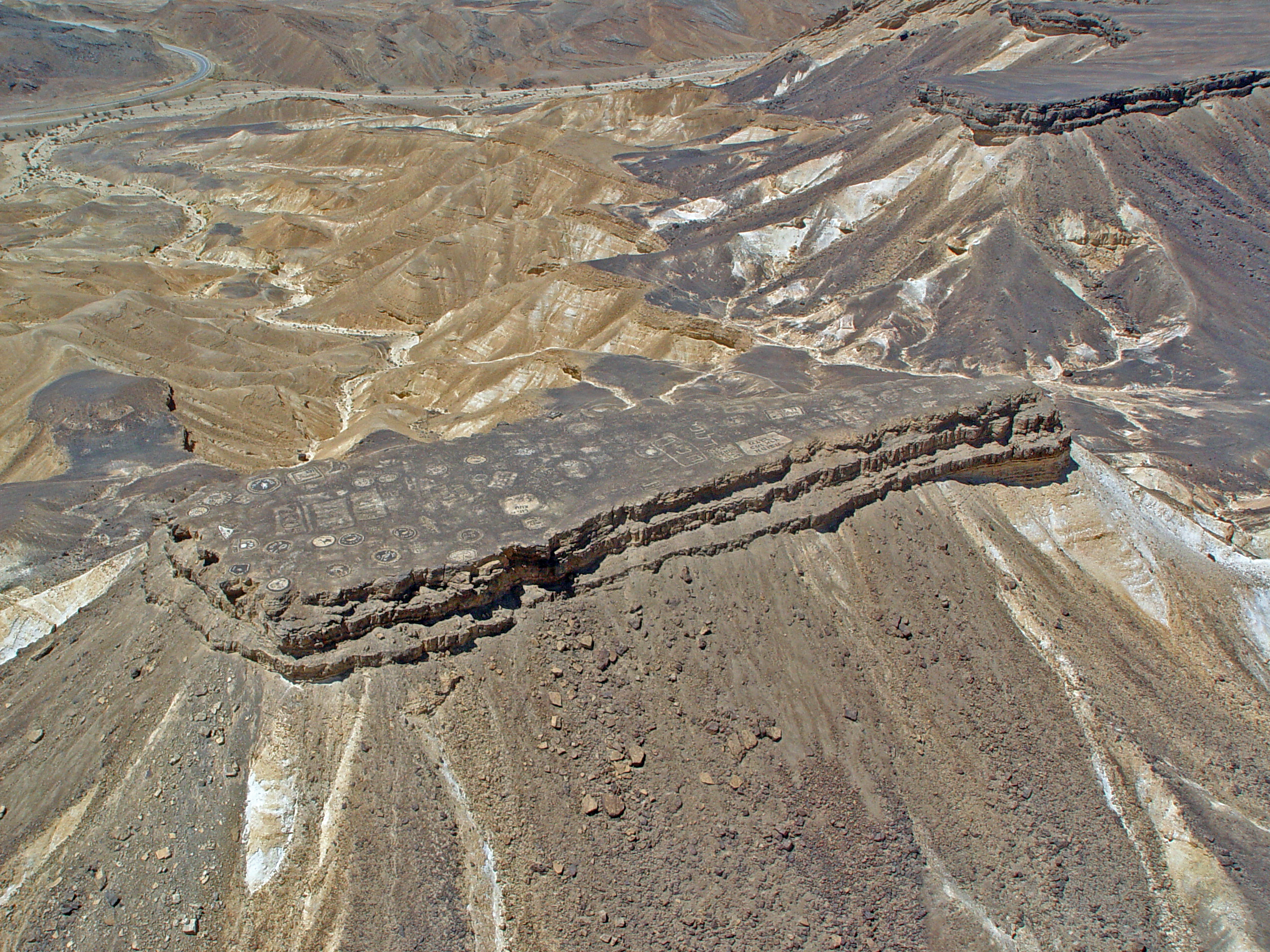
Har Qatum, a mesa located on the southern edge of Makhtesh Ramon, Israel

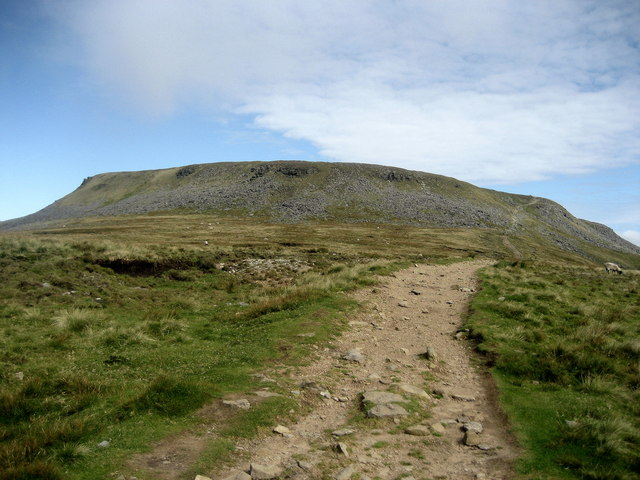
Ingleborough in North Yorkshire, England

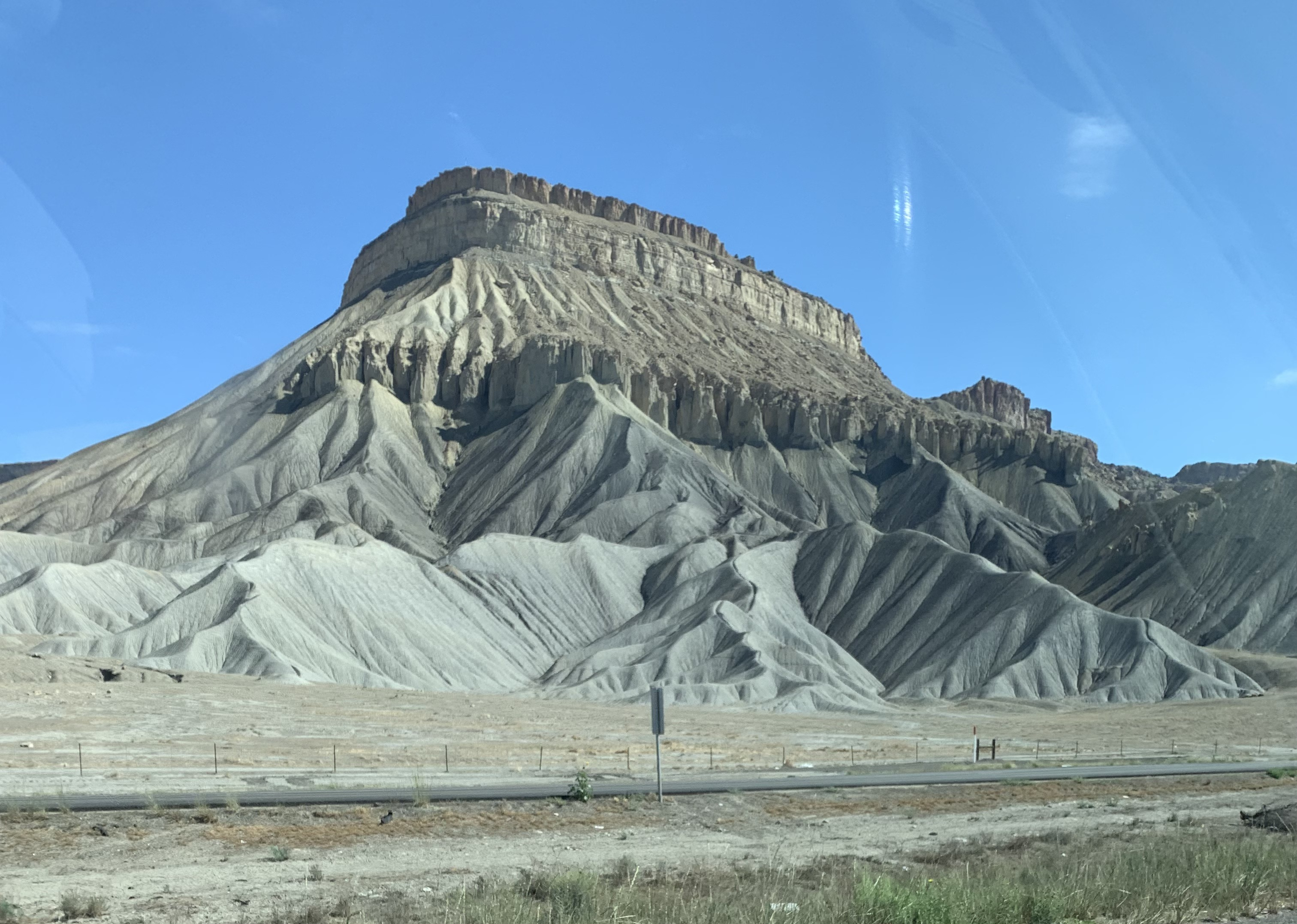
Mount Garfield, a mesa in Colorado

A mesa is an isolated, flat-topped elevation, ridge, or hill, bounded from all sides by steep escarpments and standing distinctly above a surrounding plain. Mesas consist of flat-lying soft sedimentary rocks, such as shales, capped by a resistant layer of harder rock, like sandstone or limestone, forming a caprock that protects the flat summit. The caprock may also include dissected lava flows or eroded duricrust.

Unlike a plateau, which is a broader, elevated region that may not have horizontal bedrock (e.g., Tibetan Plateau), a mesa is defined by flat-lying strata and steep-sided isolation. Large, flat-topped plateaus with horizontal strata, less isolated and often part of extensive plateau systems, are called tablelands. A butte is a smaller, eroded mesa with a limited summit, while a cuesta has a gentle dip slope and one steep escarpment due to tilted strata.

== Names, definition and etymology ==
As noted by geologist Kirk Bryan in 1922, mesas "...stand distinctly above the surrounding country, as a table stands above the floor upon which it rests". It is from this appearance that the term mesa was adopted from the Spanish word mesa, meaning "table".

A mesa is similar to, but has a more extensive summit area than, a butte. There is no agreed size limit that separates mesas from either buttes or plateaus. For example, the flat-topped mountains which are known as mesas in the Cockburn Range of North Western Australia have areas as large as 350 km^{2} (140 mi^{2}). In contrast, flat topped hills with areas as small as 0.1 km^{2} (0.039 mi^{2}) in the Elbe Sandstone Mountains, Germany, are described as mesas.

Less strictly, a very broad, flat-topped, usually isolated hill or mountain of moderate height bounded on at least one side by a steep cliff or slope and representing an erosion remnant also have been called mesas.

In the English-language geomorphic and geologic literature, other terms for mesa have also been used. For example, in the Roraima region of Venezuela, the traditional name, tepui, from the local Pomón language, and the term table mountains have been used to describe local flat-topped mountains. Similar landforms in Australia are known as tablehills, table-top hills, tent hills, or jump ups (jump-ups). The German term Tafelberg has also been used in the English scientific literature in the past.

== Formation ==
Mesas form by weathering and erosion of horizontally layered rocks that have been uplifted by tectonic activity. Variations in the ability of different types of rock to resist weathering and erosion cause the weaker types of rocks to be eroded away, leaving the more resistant types of rocks topographically higher than their surroundings. This process is called differential erosion. The most resistant rock types include sandstone, conglomerate, quartzite, basalt, chert, limestone, lava flows and sills. Lava flows and sills, in particular, are very resistant to weathering and erosion, and often form the flat top, or caprock, of a mesa. The less resistant rock layers are mainly made up of shale, a softer rock that weathers and erodes more easily.

The differences in strength of various rock layers are what give mesas their distinctive shape. Less resistant rocks are eroded away on the surface into valleys, where they collect water drainage from the surrounding area, while the more resistant layers are left standing out. A large area of very resistant rock, such as a sill, may shield the layers below it from erosion while the softer rock surrounding it is eroded into valleys, thus forming a caprock.

Differences in rock type also reflect on the sides of a mesa, as instead of smooth slopes, the sides are broken into a staircase pattern called "cliff-and-bench topography". The more resistant layers form the cliffs, or stairsteps, while the less resistant layers form gentle slopes, or benches, between the cliffs. Cliffs retreat and are eventually cut off from the main cliff, or plateau, by basal sapping. When the cliff edge does not retreat uniformly but instead is indented by headward eroding streams, a section can be cut off from the main cliff, forming a mesa.

Basal sapping occurs when water flowing around the rock layers of the mesa erodes the underlying soft shale layers, either as surface runoff from the mesa top or from groundwater moving through permeable overlying layers, which leads to slumping and flowage of the shale. As the underlying shale erodes away, it can no longer support the overlying cliff layers, which collapse and retreat. When the caprock has caved away to the point where only little remains, it is known as a butte.

== Examples and locations ==
=== Australia ===
- Cockburn Range, Western Australia
- Mount Conner, Northern Territory
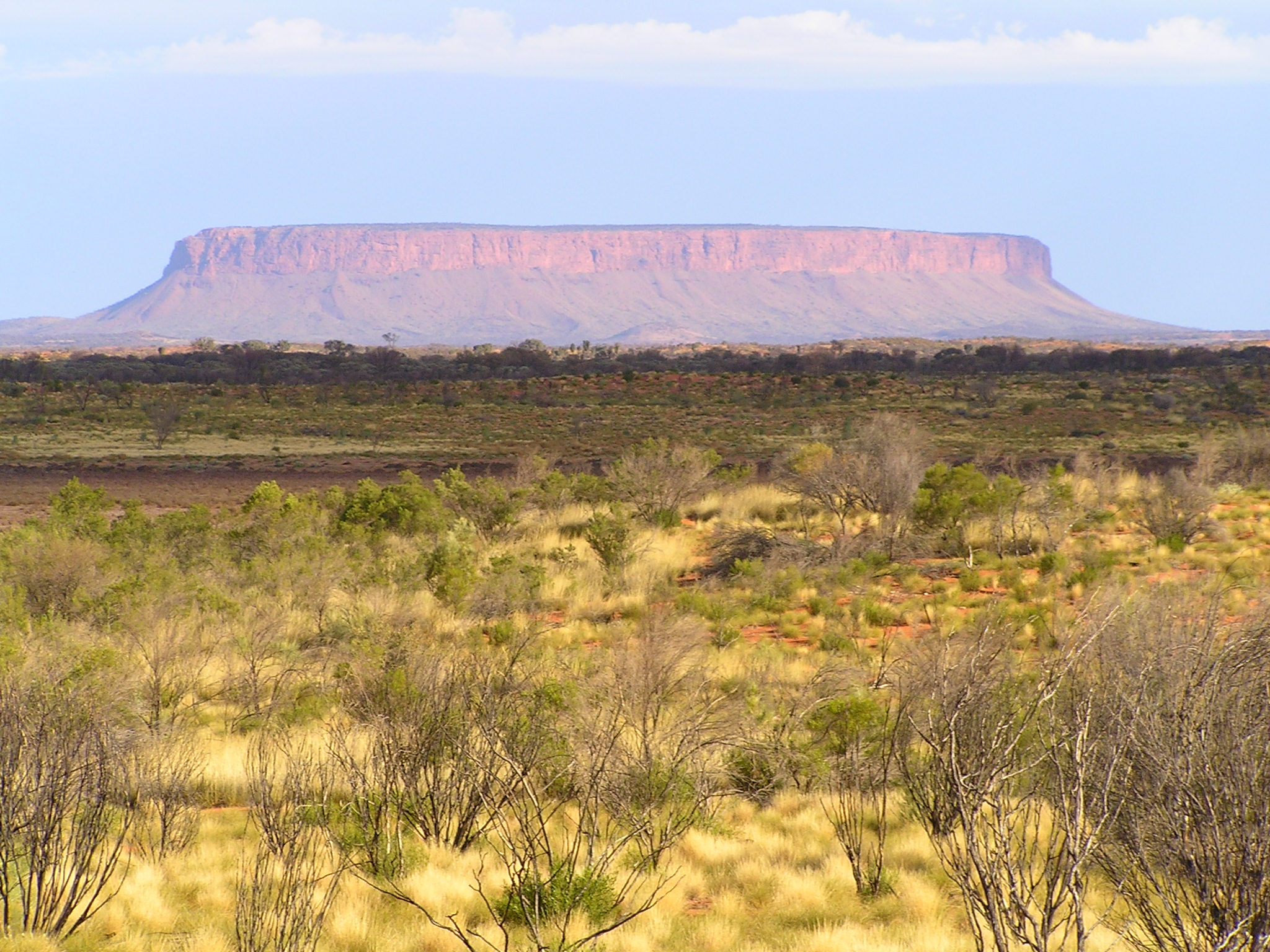
Mount Conner, a mesa located in Northern Territory, Australia

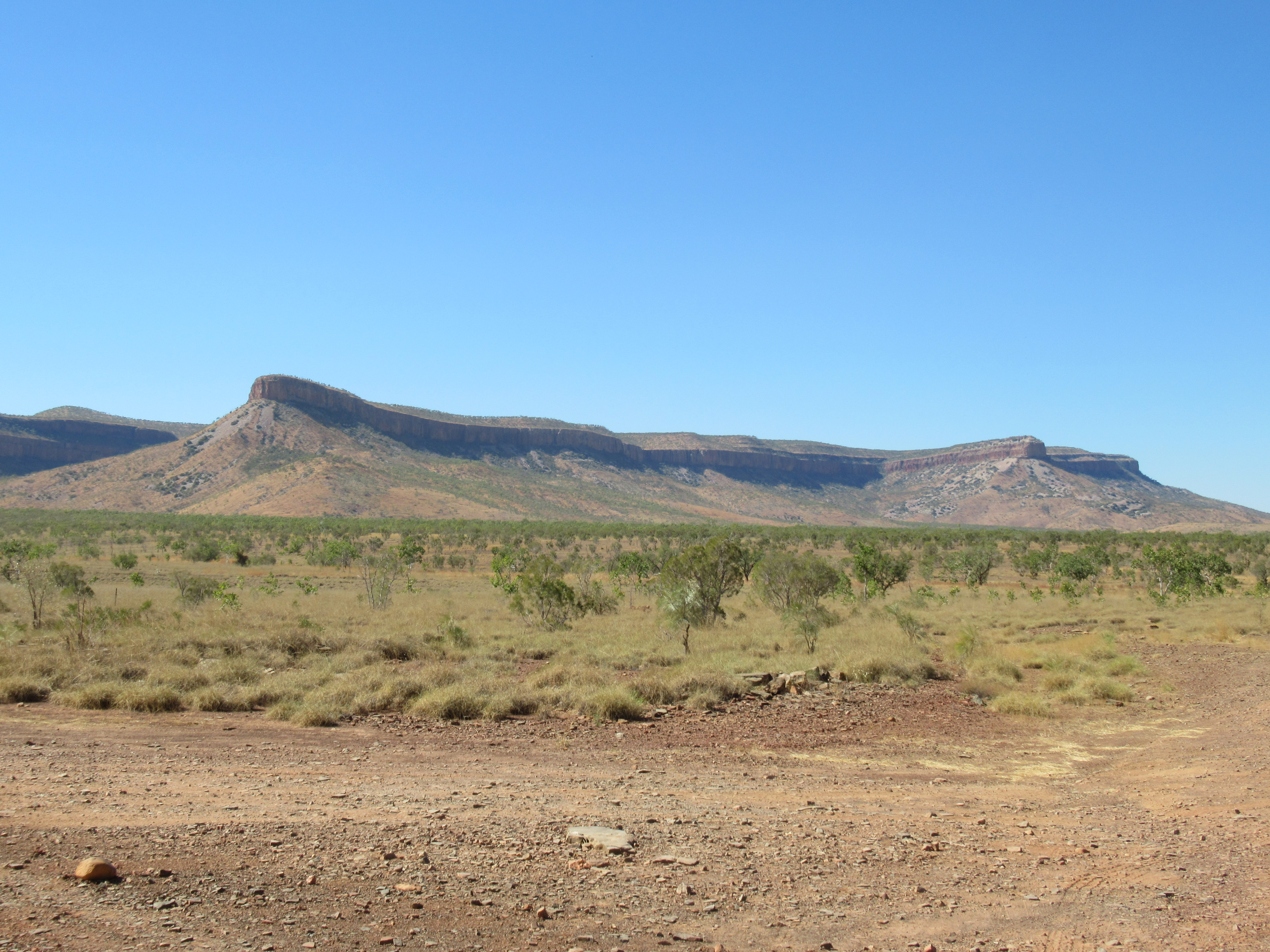
Cockburn Range, Kimberley, Western Australia, Australia

=== Czechia ===
- Děčínský Sněžník, Ústí nad Labem Region

=== France ===
- Mont Aiguille, Auvergne-Rhône-Alpes

=== Germany ===
- Königstein, Saxony
- Lilienstein, Saxony
- Papststein, Saxony
- Pfaffenstein, Saxony
- Quirl, Saxony

=== India ===
- Several near Owk mandal, Andhra Pradesh

=== Iraq ===
- Amadiya, Kurdistan Region
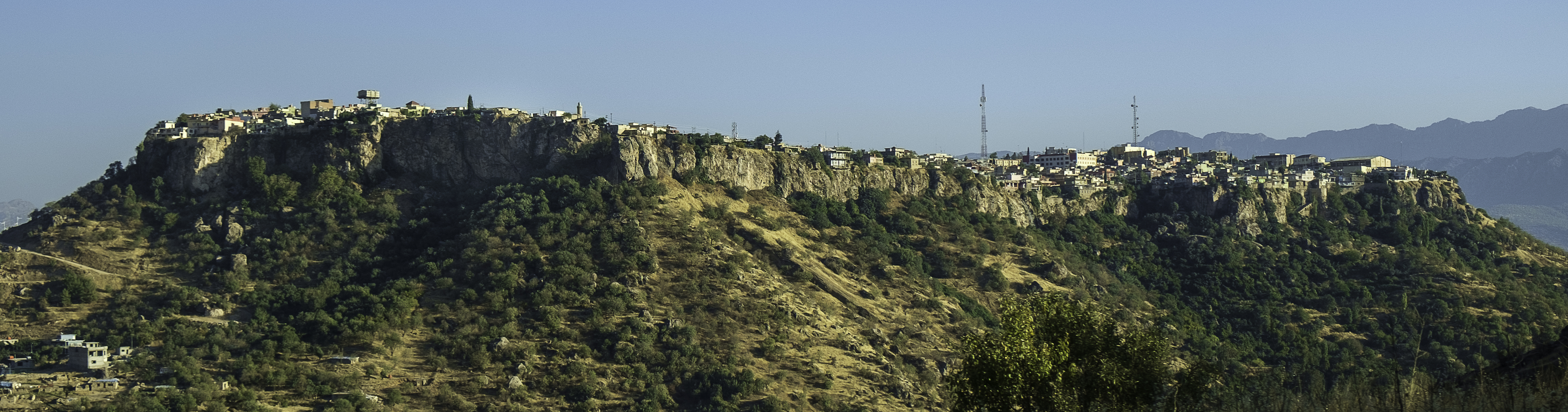
Amadiya, Iraq, a city in its entirety built on a mesa

=== Ireland ===
- Benbulbin, County Sligo
- Knocknarea, County Sligo
- Knocknashee, County Sligo

=== Israel ===
- Masada, Southern District
- Har Qatum

=== Italy ===
- Monte Santo, Sardinia

=== Poland ===
- Szczeliniec Wielki, Lower Silesian Voivodeship

=== United Kingdom ===
==== England ====
- Castle Folds, Cumbria
- Cross Fell, Cumbria
- Goldsborough Carr, County Durham
- Higger Tor, South Yorkshire
- Ingleborough, North Yorkshire
- Pen-y-ghent, North Yorkshire
- Shacklesborough, County Durham

==== Scotland ====
- Healabhal Mhòr, Isle of Skye

=== United States ===
Many but not all American mesas lie within the Basin and Range Province.

==== Arizona ====
- Anderson Mesa
- Black Mesa (Apache-Navajo Counties)
- Black Mesa (Navajo County)
- Black Mesa (Warm Springs)
- Black Mountain
- Cummings Mesa
- First Mesa
- Horseshoe Mesa
- Indian Mesa
- Second Mesa

==== Arkansas ====
- Mount Magazine

==== California ====
- Redonda Mesa

==== Colorado ====
- Battlement Mesa
- Grand Mesa - largest flat-topped mountain in the world.
- Green Mountain
- Log Hill Mesa
- North Table Mountain
- Raton Mesa

==== Nevada ====
- Mormon Mesa
- Pahute Mesa

==== Oklahoma ====
- Black Mesa
- Mesa de Maya

==== Texas ====
- Floating Mesa
- Llano Estacado

==== Utah ====
- Checkerboard Mesa
- Crazy Quilt Mesa
- Hurricane Mesa
- Sams Mesa
- Smith Mesa
- South Caineville Mesa
- Thompson Mesa
- Wildcat Mesa
- Wingate Mesa

==== Wisconsin ====
- Gibraltar Rock
- Grandad Bluff
- Mile Bluff
- Quincy Bluff
- Rattlesnake Mound

== On Mars ==
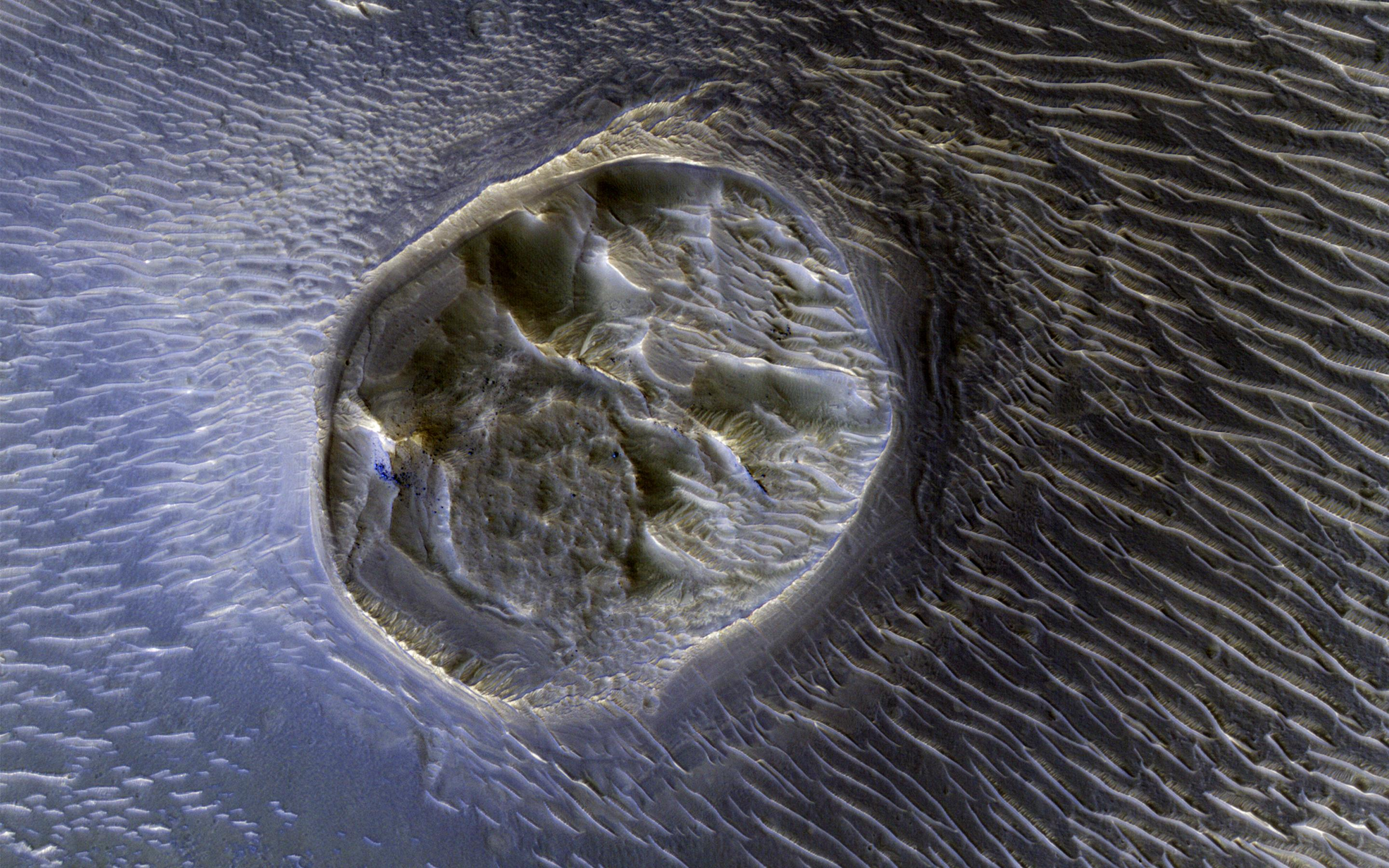
A mesa in Noctis Labyrinthus on Mars, viewed by HiRISE

A transitional zone on Mars, known as fretted terrain, lies between highly cratered highlands and less cratered lowlands. The younger lowland exhibits steep walled mesas and knobs. The mesa and knobs are separated by flat lying lowlands. They are thought to form from ice-facilitated mass wasting processes from ground or atmospheric sources. The mesas and knobs decrease in size with increasing distance from the highland escarpment. The relief of the mesas range from nearly 2 km (1.2 mi) to 100 m (330 ft) depending on the distance they are from the escarpment.

== See also ==
- Amba – Steep-sided, flat-topped mountain in Ethiopia, usually harboring various settlement
- Archipelago – Collection of islands
- Butte – Isolated hill with steep, often vertical sides and a small, relatively flat top
- Dissected plateau – Plateaus area that has been severely eroded so that the relief is sharp
- Mensa – Flat-topped prominence with cliff-like edges
- Mesa Verde National Park – U.S. national park in Colorado
- Nor'Wester Mountains – Mountain range in Ontario, Canada – Group of mountains immediately south of Thunder Bay, Ontario, Canada
- Pingdingshan – Chinese city named after a local mesa
- Potrero – Long mesa that at one end slopes upward to higher terrain
- Table hill – Raised landform with a flat top
- Table Mountain – Mountain overlooking Cape Town, South Africa
- Tepui – Table-top mountain or mesa in the Guiana Highlands of South America
- Tundra – Biome where plant growth is hindered by frigid temperatures
- Tuya – Flat-topped, steep-sided volcano
