= Pinnacle (geology) =

Individual column of rock

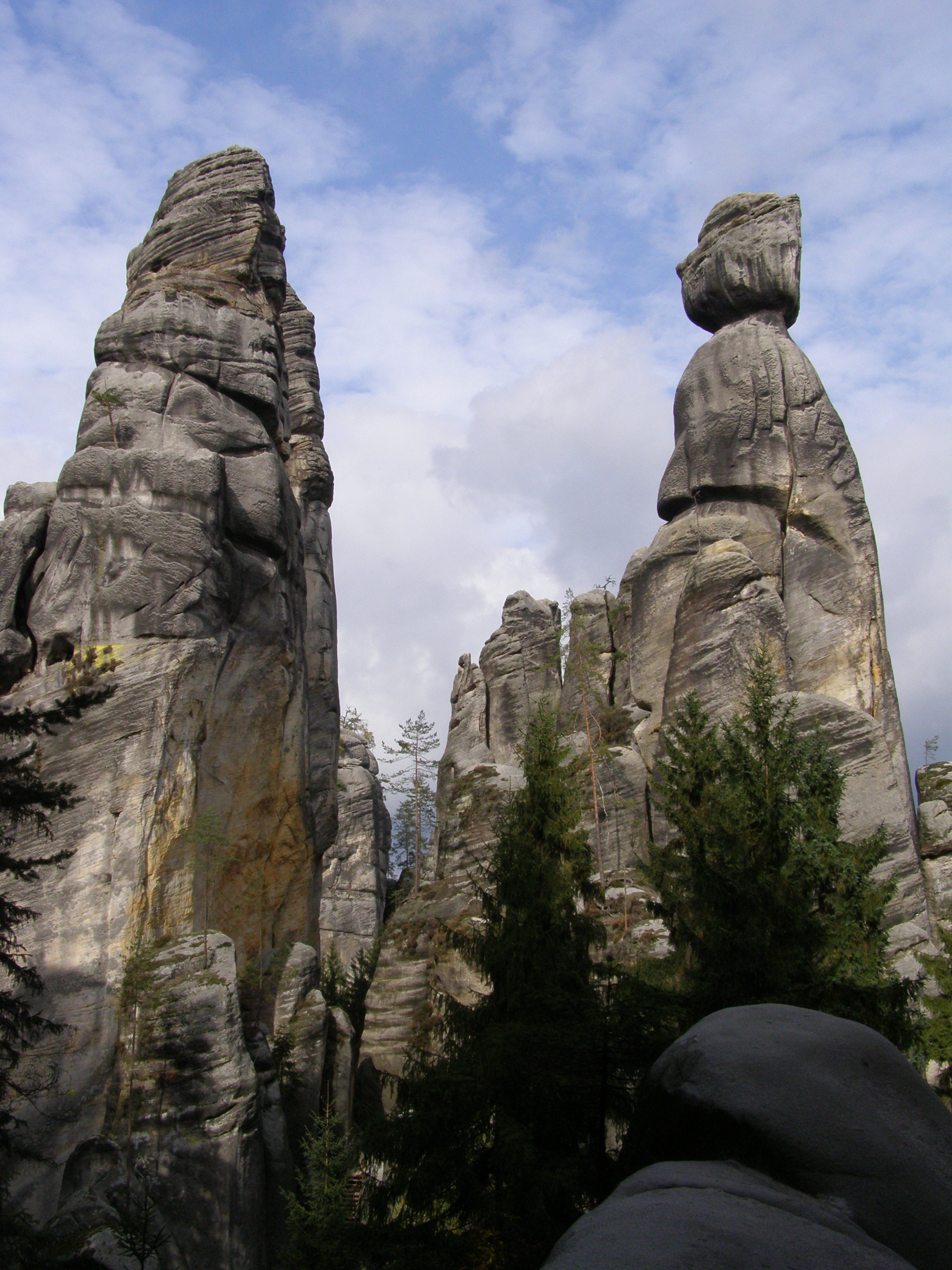
Rock towers at Adrspašské rocks (Bohemia, Czech Republic)

A pinnacle, tower, spire, needle, monument, or natural tower (German: Felsnadel, Felsturm, or Felszinne) in geology is an individual column of rock, isolated from other rocks or groups of rocks, in the shape of a vertical shaft or spire. It is a natural geomorphological shape and a structural denudation shape of the relief. It is an isolated, tall, and often also slender column or prism, reminiscent of a tower in its shape. A specific type of rock tower is the rock needle.

== Formation ==
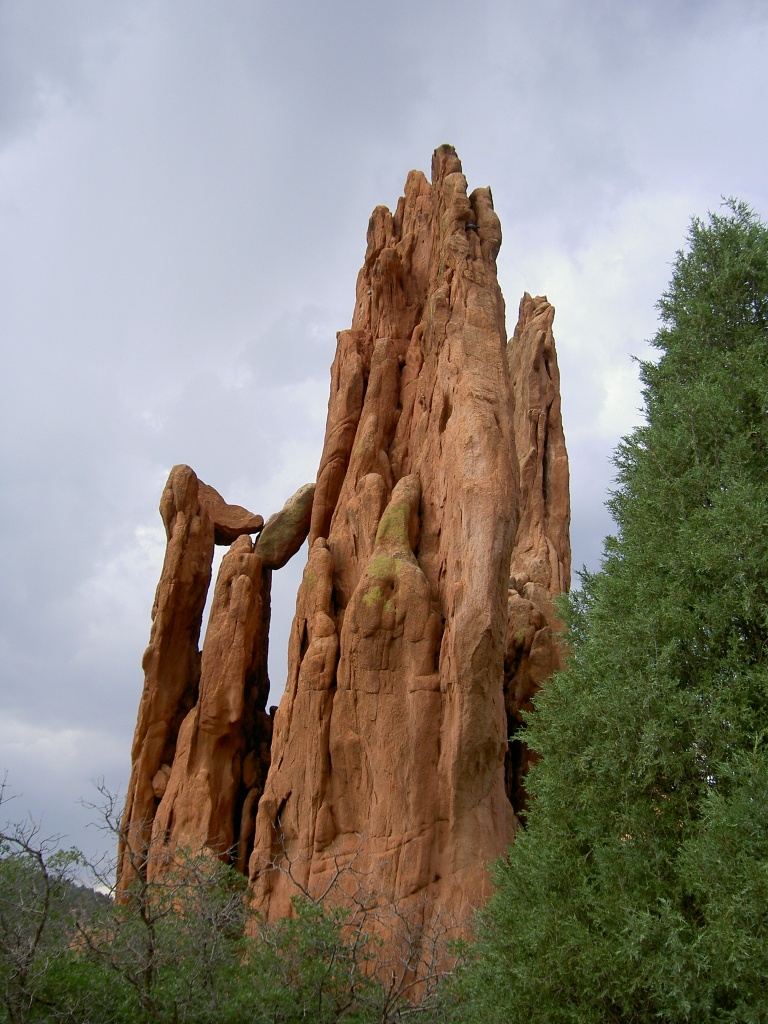
Tower of Babel in the Garden of the Gods (Colorado Springs, US)

The rock tower was created as a result of mechanical erosion, namely the gradual breakdown and destruction of a flat plateau or a rocky mountain ridge. Its shape is the result of mechanical weathering and the attitude of the rock, or the subsidence of the slope. On the sea coast, rock towers are created by abrasion and isolation of the more resistant parts of the worn and abraded coast (cliff).

== Distribution ==
Rock towers are found in various parts of the world. They are found on the edges of high mountains and tabular plateaus, such as buttes in arid regions, or on heavily disturbed rocky coasts. However, they are most often found in the area of sandstone rock towns.

Examples are the summits of the Aiguille du Midi in the Mont Blanc massif in France, the almost 43-metre-high Barbarine on the south side of the Pfaffenstein hill near Königstein in Germany, or the Bischofsmütze, the Drei Zinnen, and the Vajolet Towers in the Dolomites, which are rich in such towers. An area of limestone formations within Nambung National Park, near the town of Cervantes, Western Australia, is known as The Pinnacles.

== Gallery ==
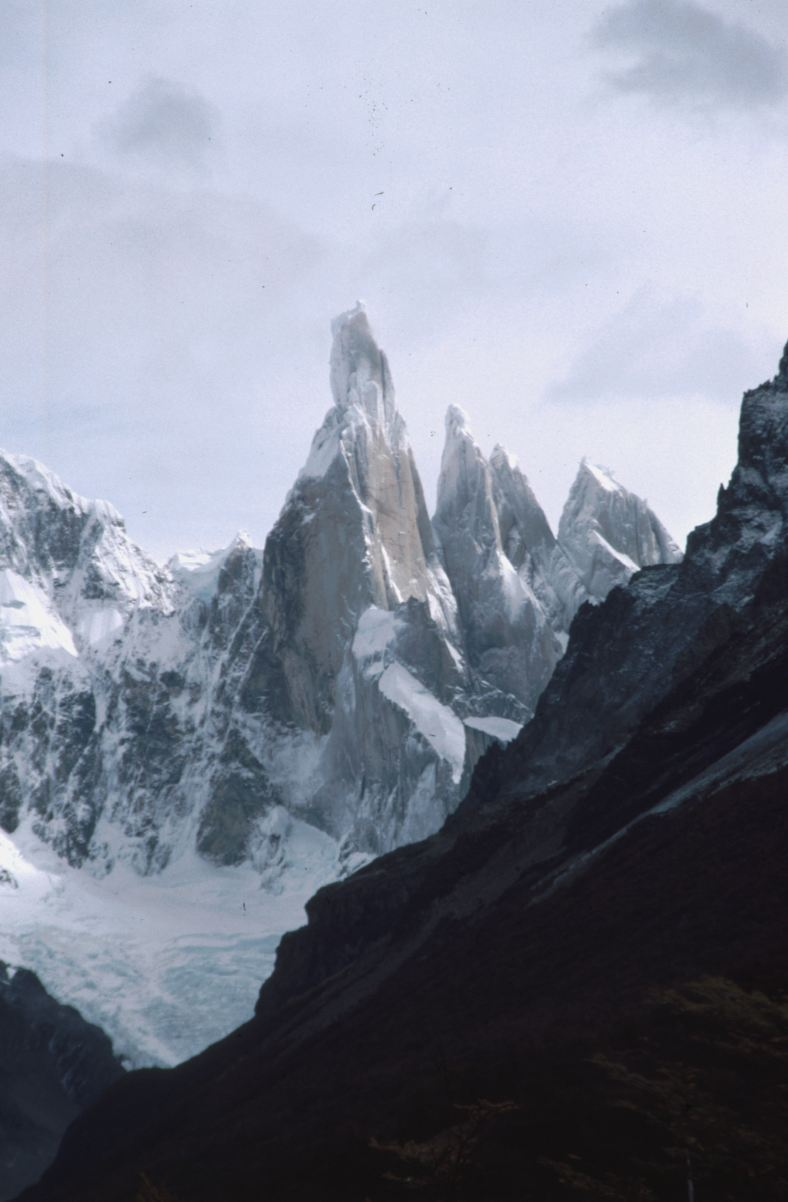
Cerro Torre 3,133 m (south flank ~2,150 m), Patagonia, Argentina/Chile

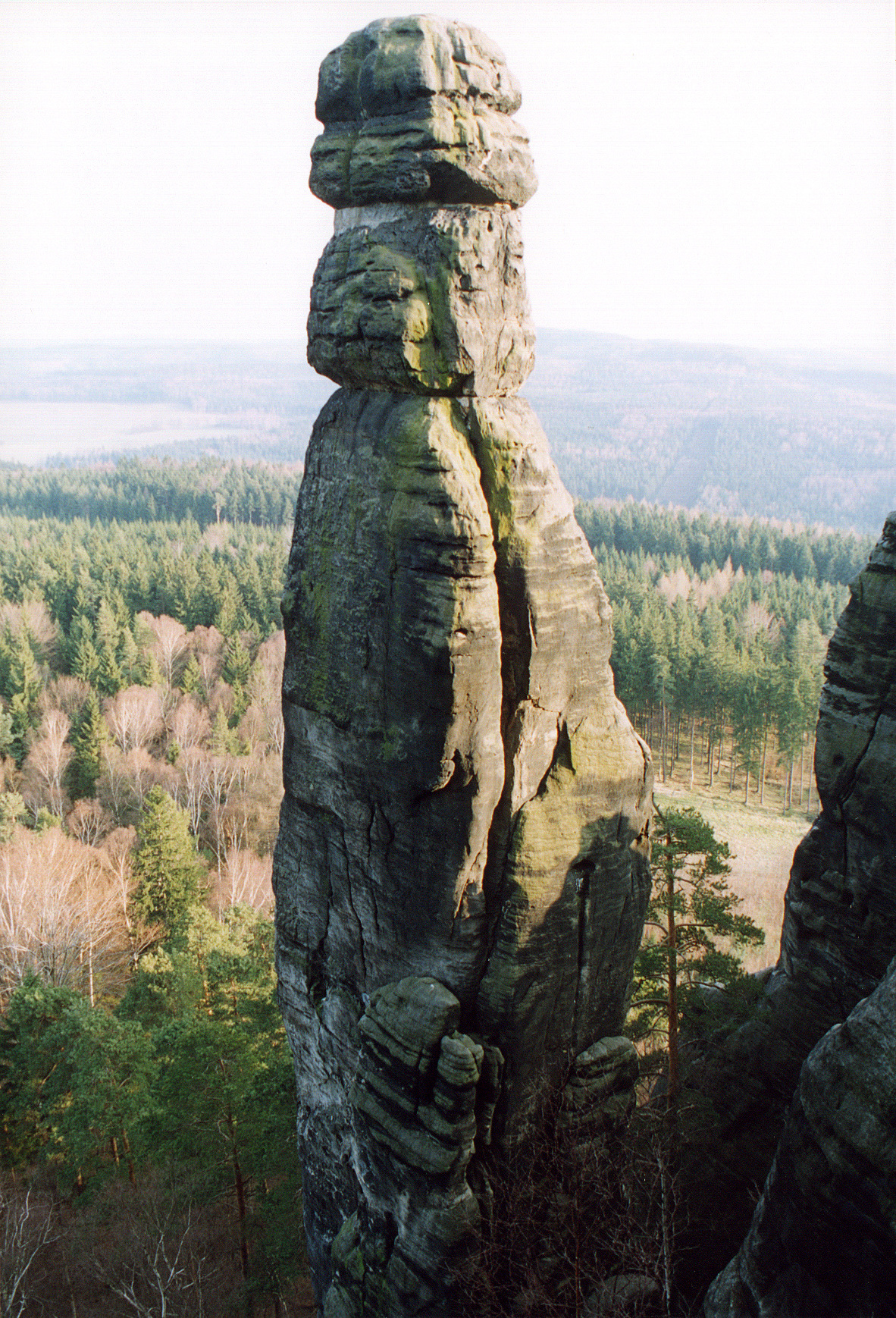
The Barbarine (43 m high), Saxon Switzerland, Germany

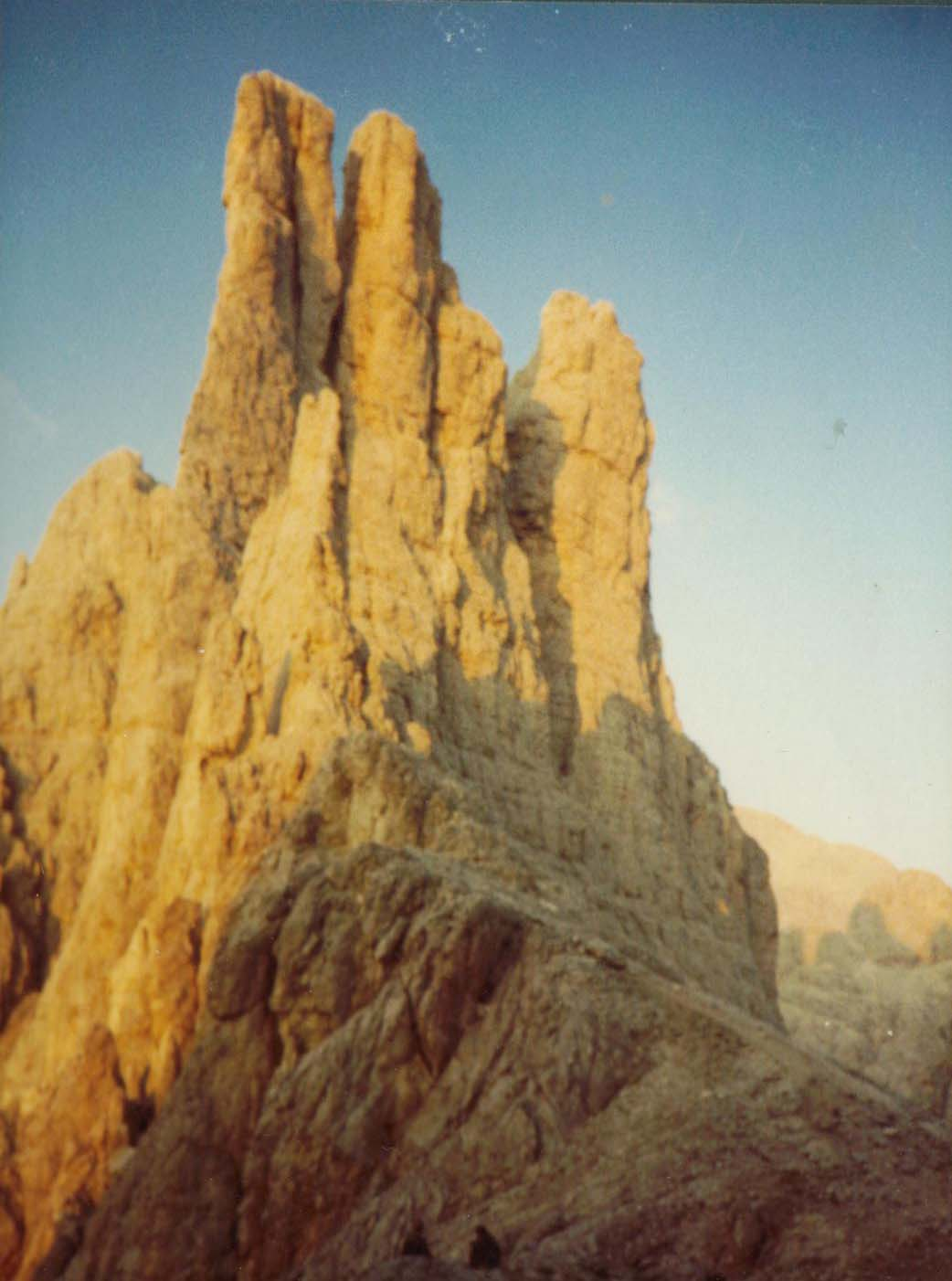
The Vajolet Towers 2,790 m (main tower 120 m high), South Tyrol, Italy

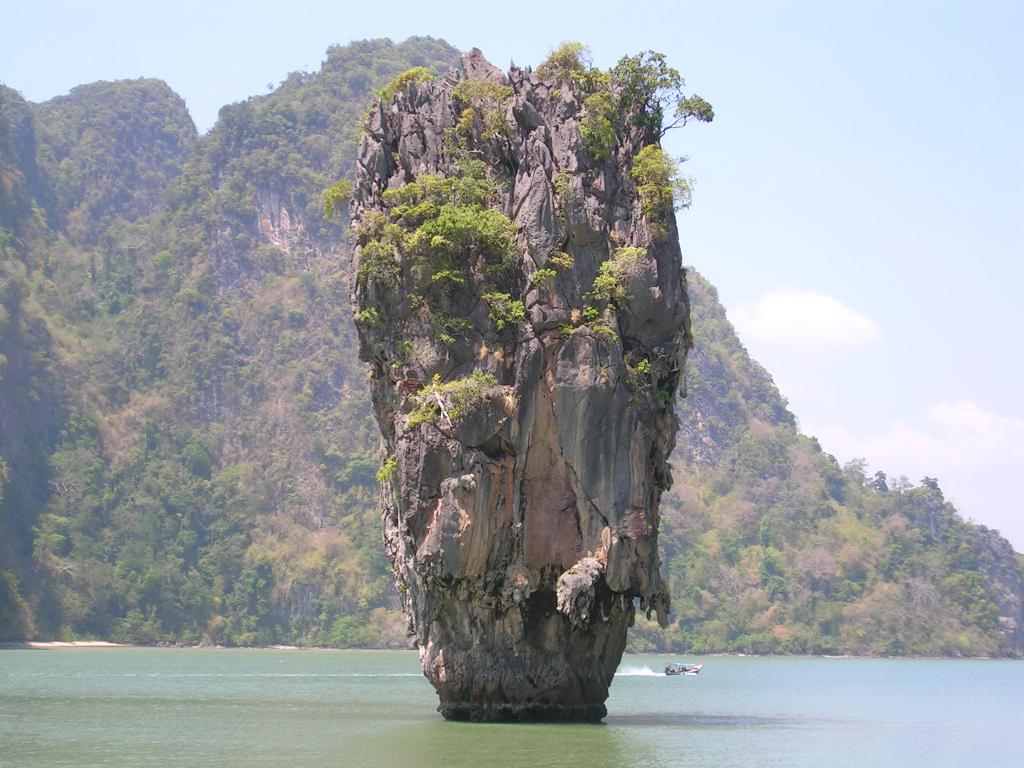
Khao Ta Pu (known as James Bond Island) off Khao Phing Kan, Thailand

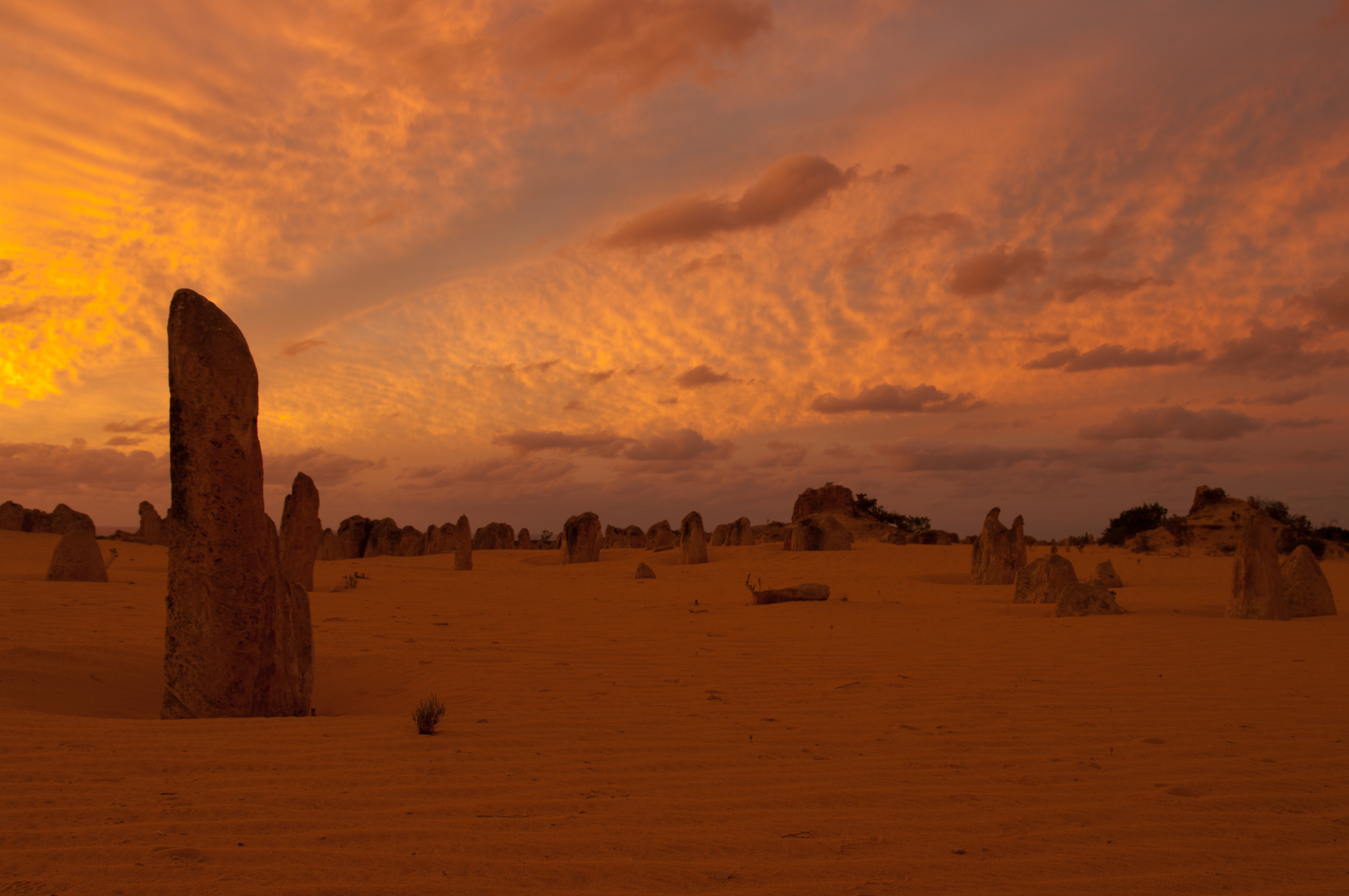
The Pinnacles, Nambung National Park, Western Australia

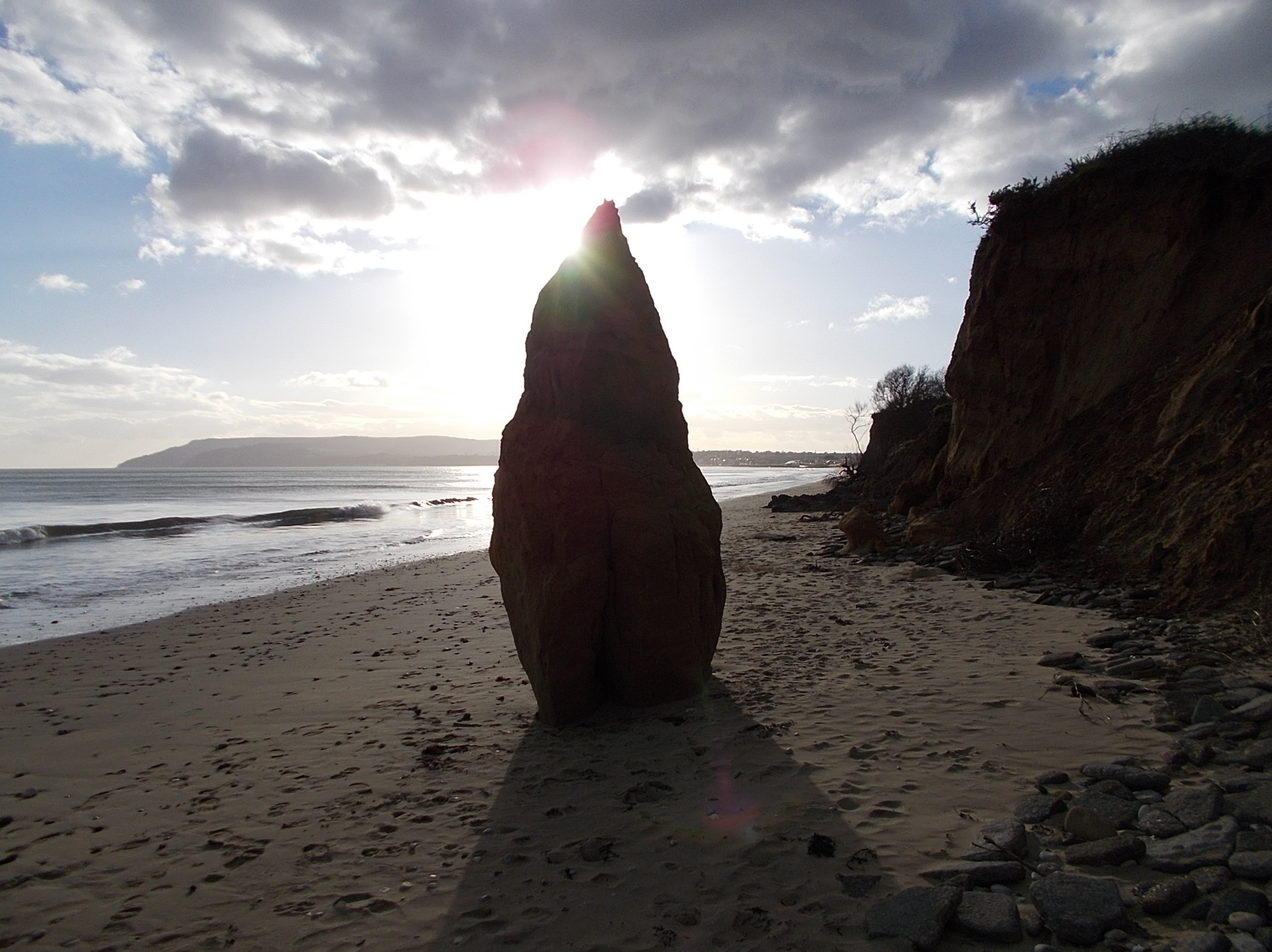
Small sandstone rock pinnacle at Yaverland, Isle of Wight, UK, formed as a result of cliff erosion

Top of the Rock Golf Course Limestone Pinnacles (excavated to a depth of 60 m in areas), Branson, Missouri, USA

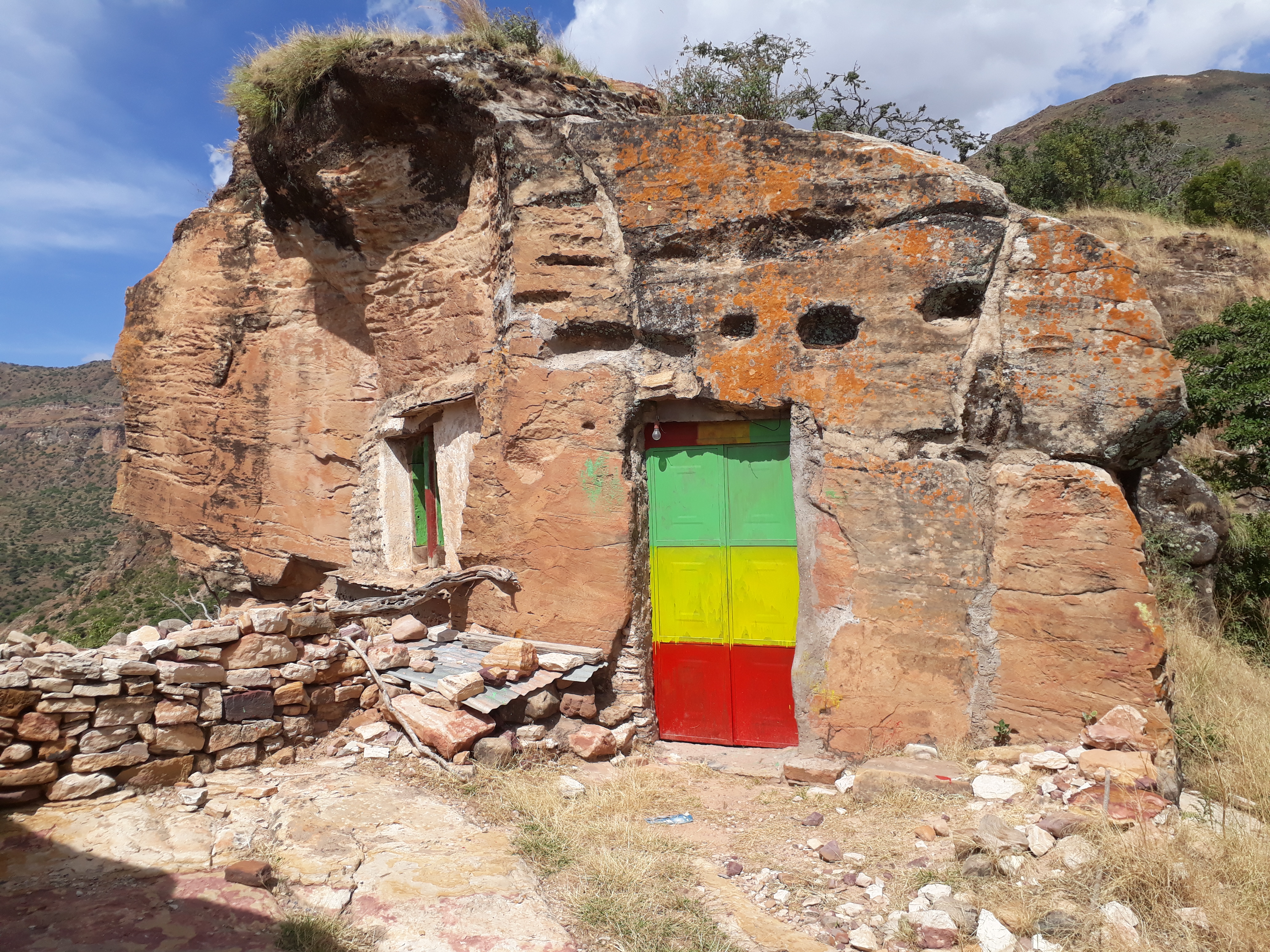
Debre Sema'it rock church on the top of a pinnacle in Ethiopia

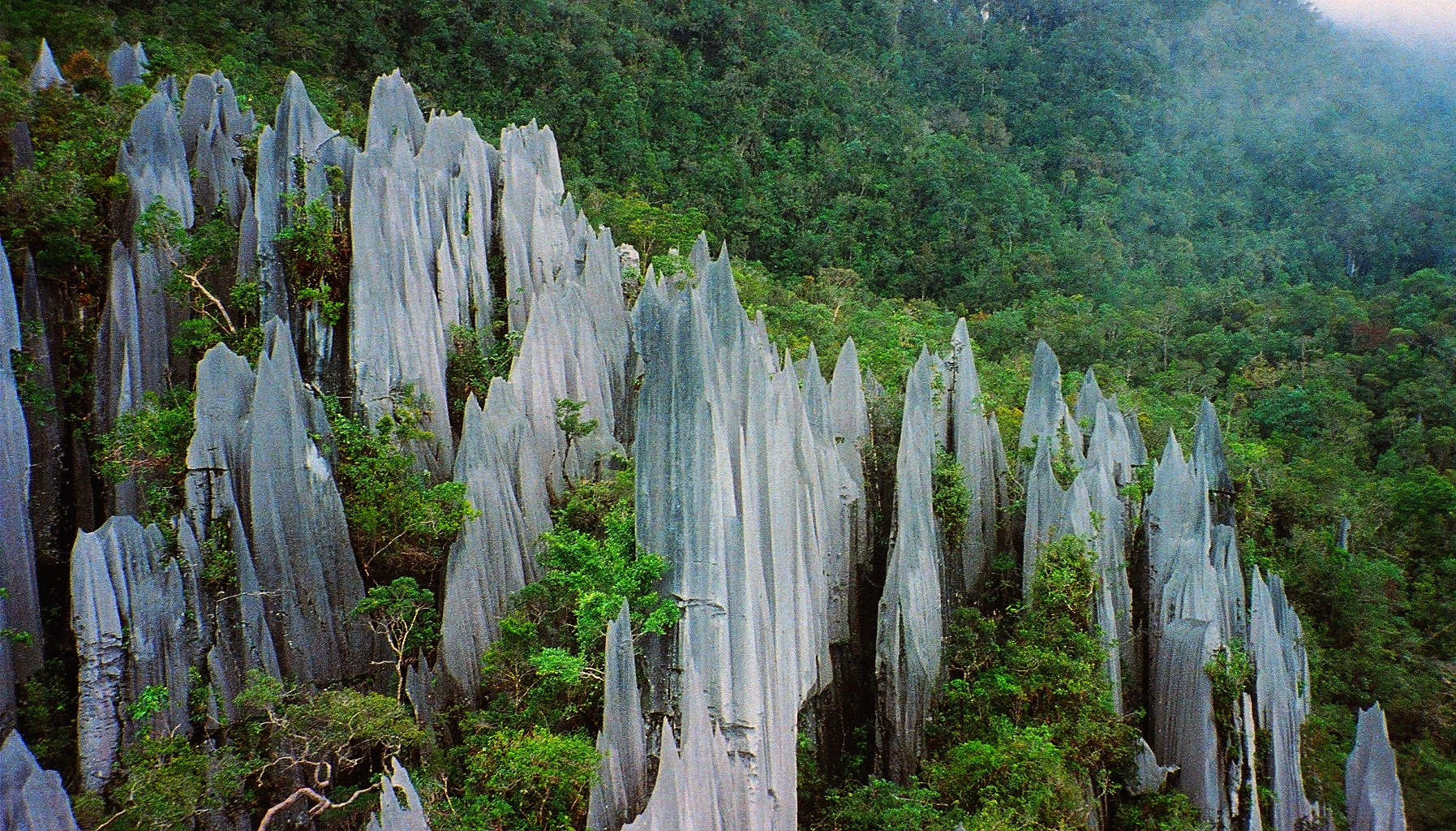
Pinnacles at Mulu, Gunung Mulu National Park, Sarawak, Malaysia

== See also ==
- Hoodoo
- Kigilyakh
- Pinnacles National Park
- Pyramidal peak
- Stack (geology)
- Totem pole (Monument Valley)
- Trango Towers

== Bibliography ==
- Jiří Adamovič, Václav Cílek, Radek Mikuláš : Atlas of Sandstone Rock Cities, Academia Praha 2010, ISBN 978-80-200-1773-4
- Josef Rubín, Břetislav Balatka, Vojen Ložek, Miroslav Malkovský, Vlastimil Pilous, Jan Vítek : Atlas of rock, earth and soil forms, Academia Prague, 1986, 1st edition, 388 pages, 21-033-86
