= Barbarine =

Free-standing Rock Formation

Coordinates: 50°53′55″N 14°4′54″E

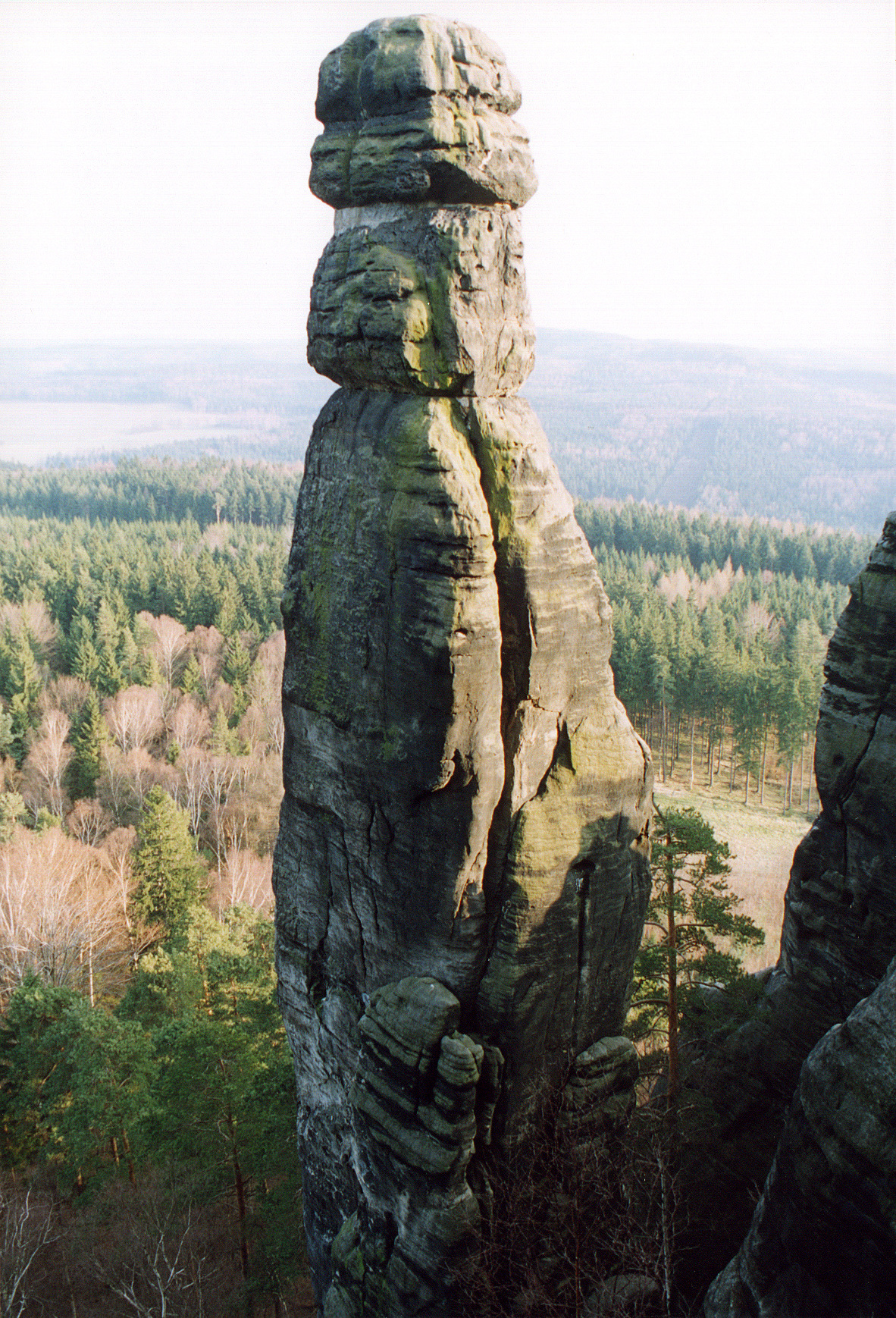
The Barbarine on the Pfaffenstein

The Barbarine is the best-known free-standing rock formation in the German part of the Elbe Sandstone Mountains. It is a rock pinnacle, 42.7 metres (140 ft) high, and is the symbol of Saxon Switzerland. It was first climbed on 19 September 1905.

== Location ==
The Barbarine belongs to the Pfaffenstein massif near the village of Pfaffendorf in the borough of Königstein.

== Development for sport climbing ==
An ascent by the climber, Felix Wendschuh, on 9 September 1905 was the first documented attempt to climb the Barbarine. He climbed up to a point underneath the summit block, at least to the end of the crevice. The story that Keiler, the publican in Pfaffenstein, had forced him to turn around under threat, should probably be discounted. Keiler was a climber himself and would have had nothing against a climb, especially as those who first climbed it later left documentary evidence with him in the pub.

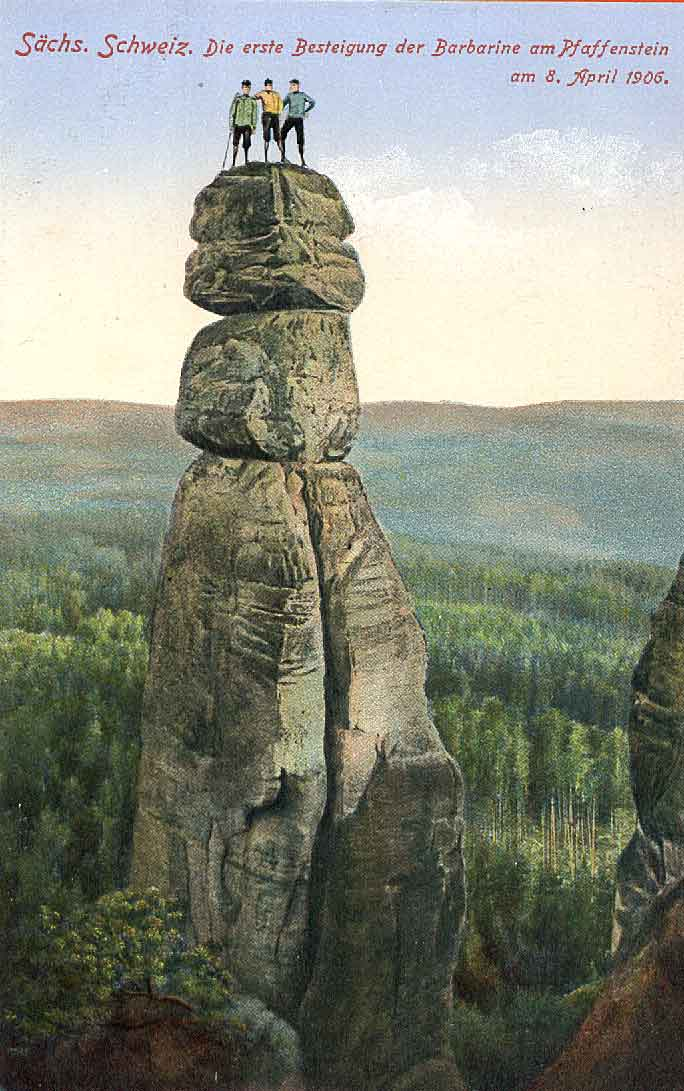
Postcard portraying the first ascent (with incorrect date: 8 April 1906)

On 19 September 1905 the Dresden climber, Rudolf Fehrmann, and the American, Oliver Perry-Smith, succeeded in becoming the first to conquer the Barbarine. They had climbed to just under the summit before midday, but were too tired to scale the last overhang on the summit head until later. Another route, on the valley side, was opened by Alfred Hermann on 8 July 1924.

Lightning strikes on the summit and progressive erosion rendered the upper part of the pinnacle increasingly unstable, so that in 1946 mountaineers poured concrete into the hollow. Due to the continued erosion, in 1964 further work was carried out; the summit block being underpinned and supported with steel cables. The broken summit block was protected from further erosion by a surrounding steel cable. Not until 1975 was a general ban on climbing the pinnacle imposed.

In 1979/80 the summit blocks were reinforced with sandstone. The upper block was given a cap of artificial sandstone and was treated with water-repellant chemicals. The geological natural monument is only climbed occasionally today – mainly by geologists and scientists who hope to avert further damage.

== The legend of the Barbarine ==
According to legend, the Barbarine is a petrified virgin, the "perpetual memorial of a punishment, according to which it so happened that a mother had told her daughter to go to church on Sunday, but during the service the daughter went up the Pfaffstein into the bilberries and when her mother found her there, she cursed her daughter in anger, pronouncing that she must be turned to stone on the spot; whereupon it happened in a moment, and therefore, this virgin turned to stone for ever warns all disobedient children with her stony appearance."'' The name Barbarine was taken from the girl's Christian name. In a variation of this legend the mother is an evil witch and the girl meets her beloved, a hunter, at the Pfaffenstein.

== Gallery ==
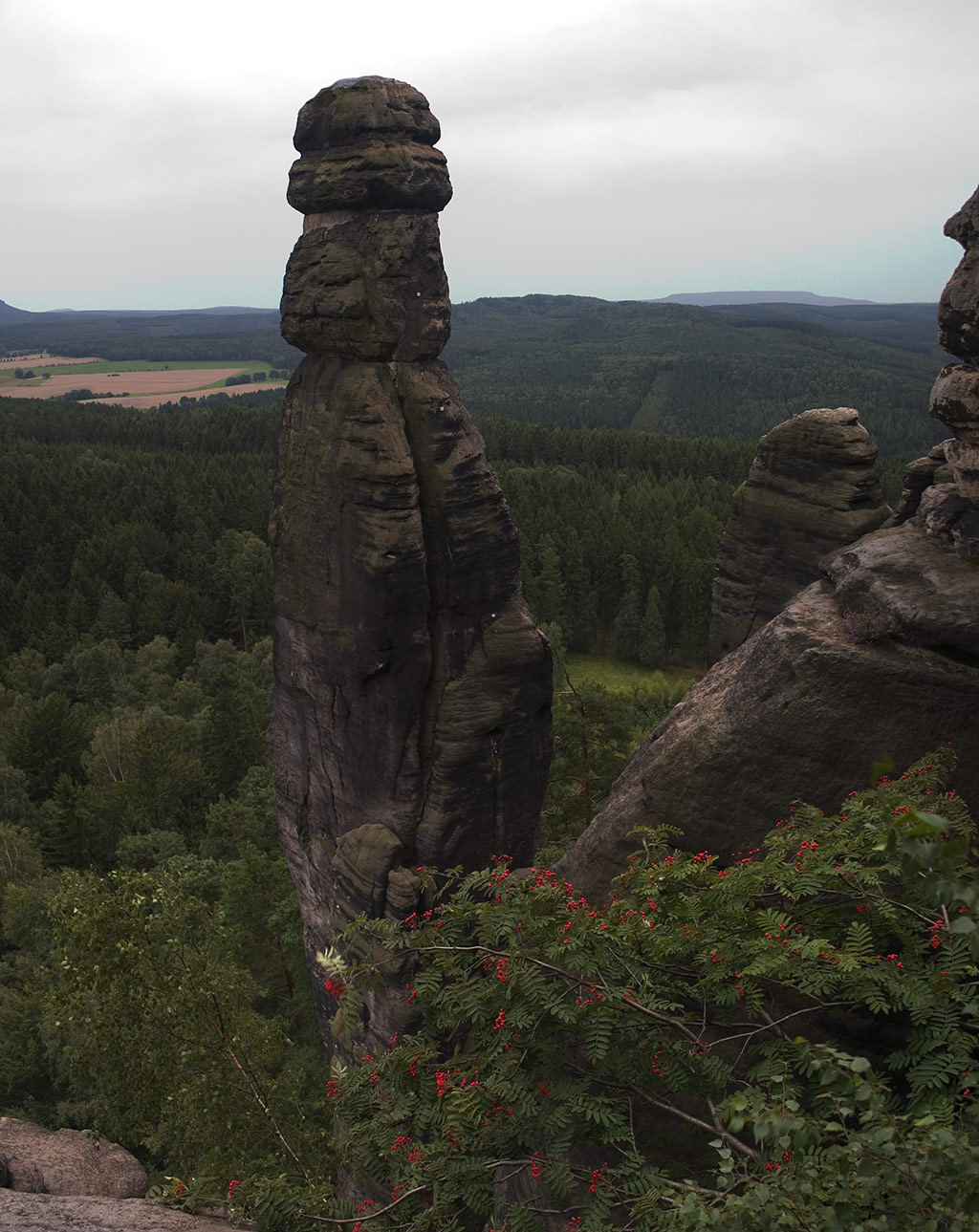
The Barbarine column in autumn

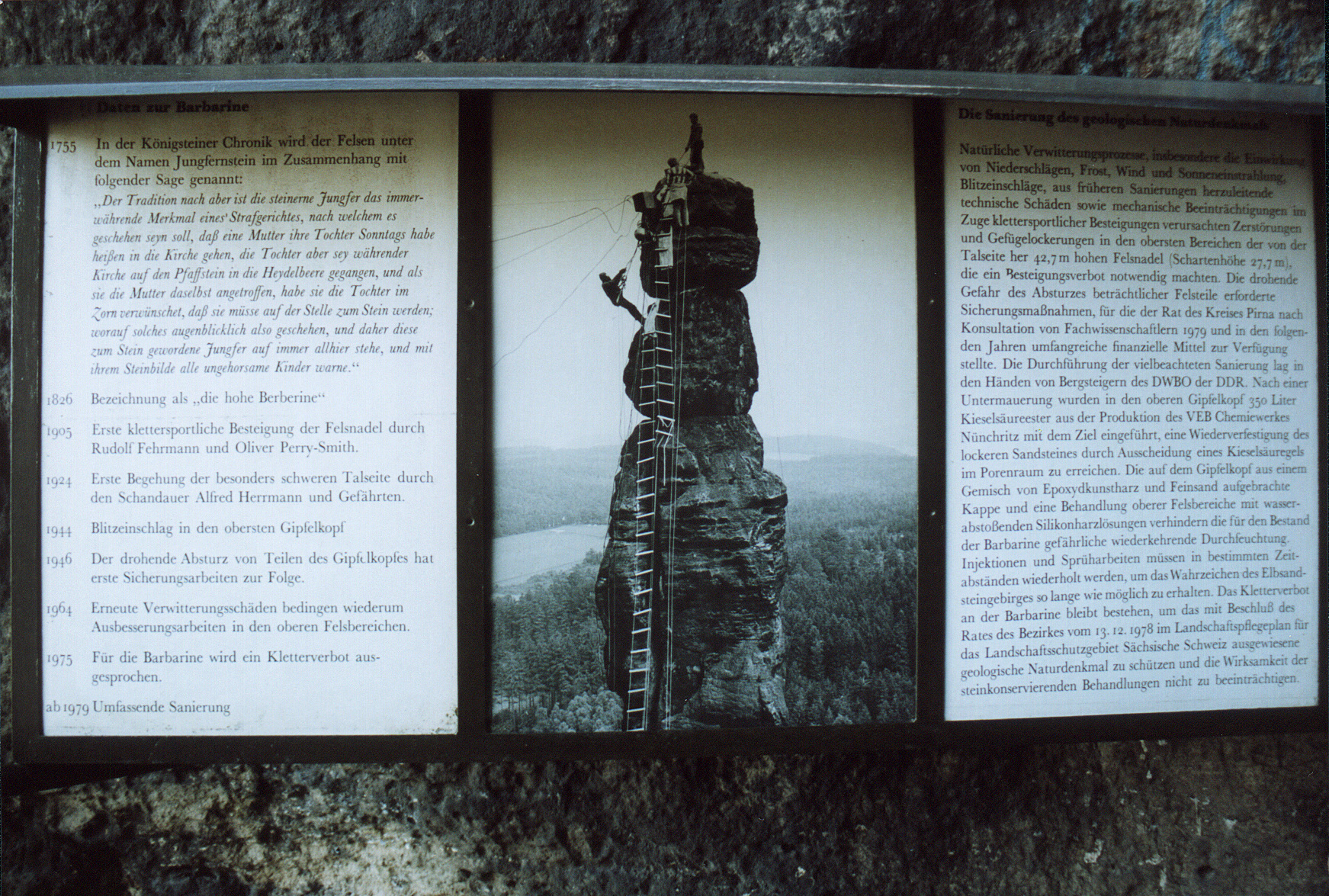
Display board on the Barbarine viewing point

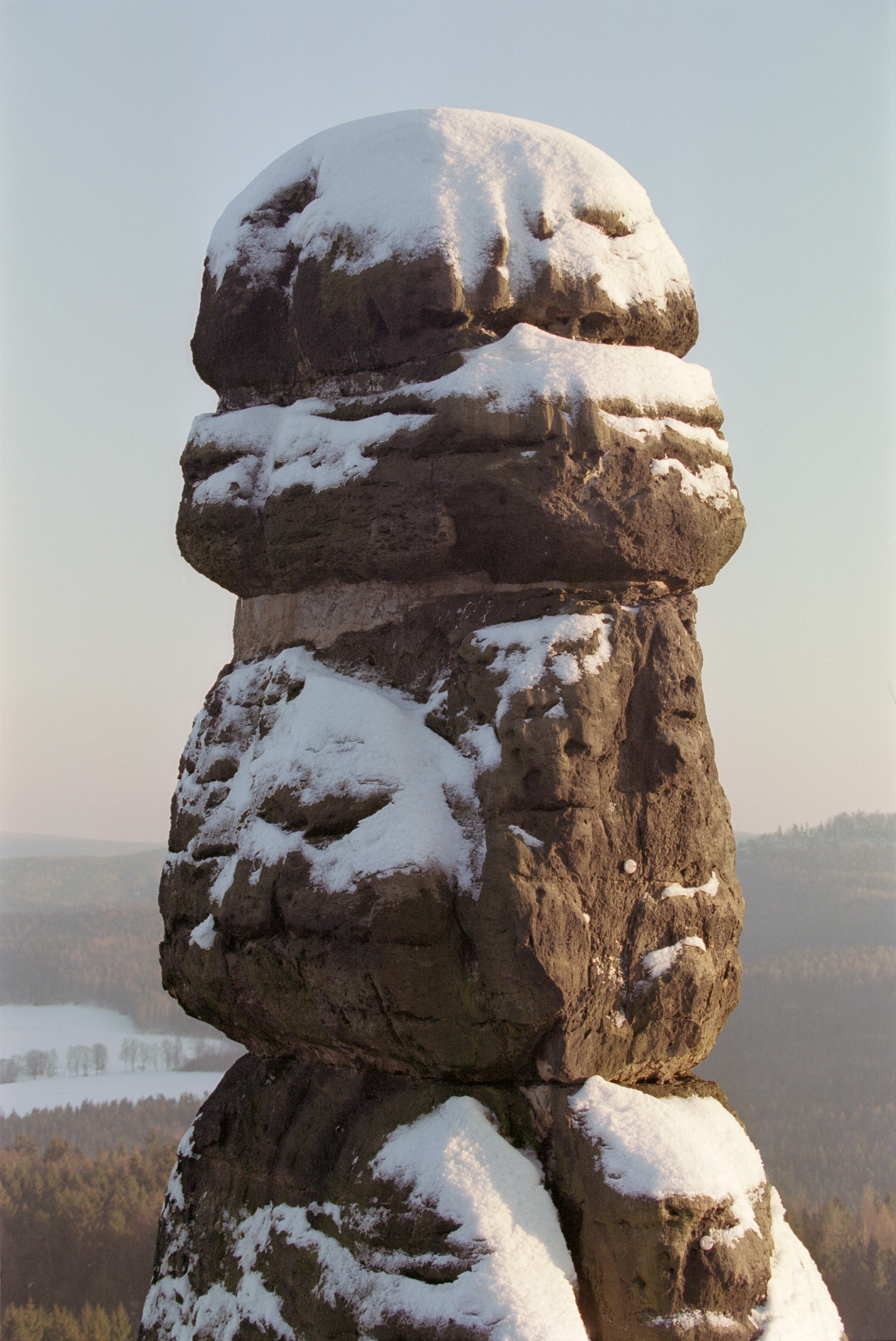
The head of the Barbarine

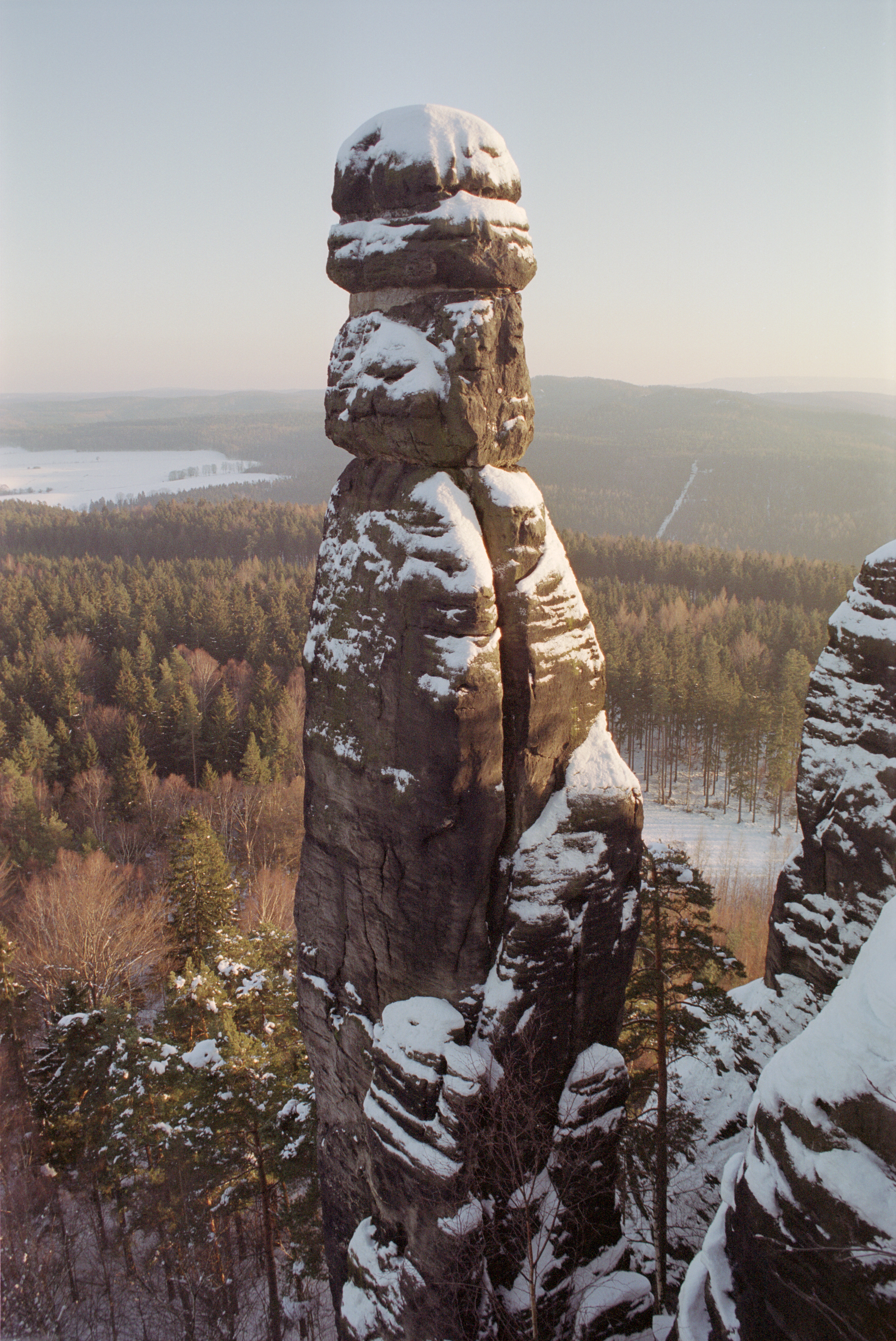
The Barbarine in winter

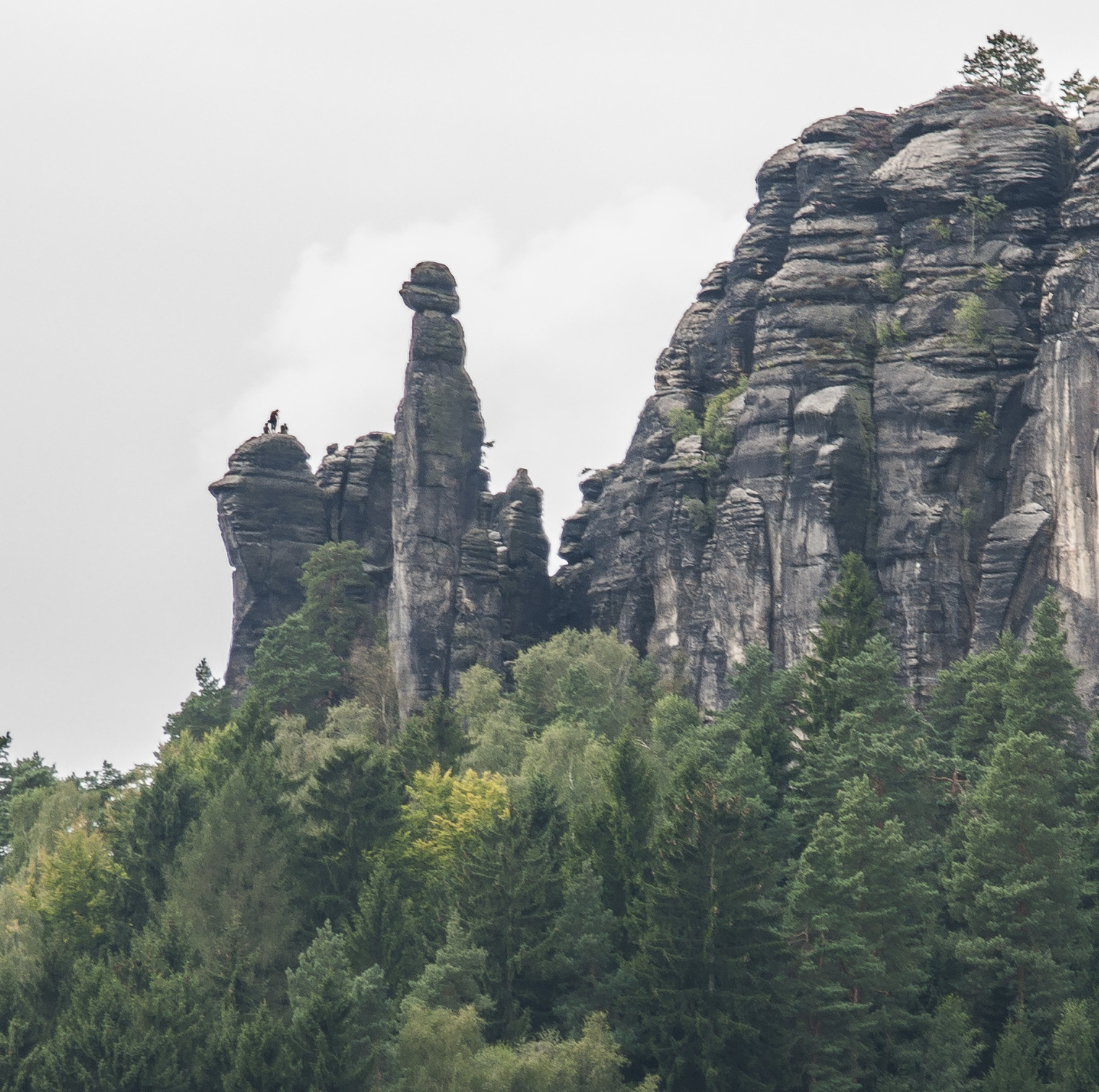
Barbarine

== See also ==
- Saxon Switzerland Climbing Area

== Sources ==
- Hans-Dieter Beeger: Natürliche und technische Sandsteinverwitterung an der Barbarine am Pfaffenstein. in: Sächsische Heimatblätter Heft 3/1965, p. 257-261
- Alfred Meiche: Sagenbuch der Sächsischen Schweiz und ihrer Randgebiete. Altis Verlag (2nd edition of the amended 2nd edition of 1929), Dresden 1997, ISBN 3-910195-02-4
