= Quirl =

Mountain in Germany

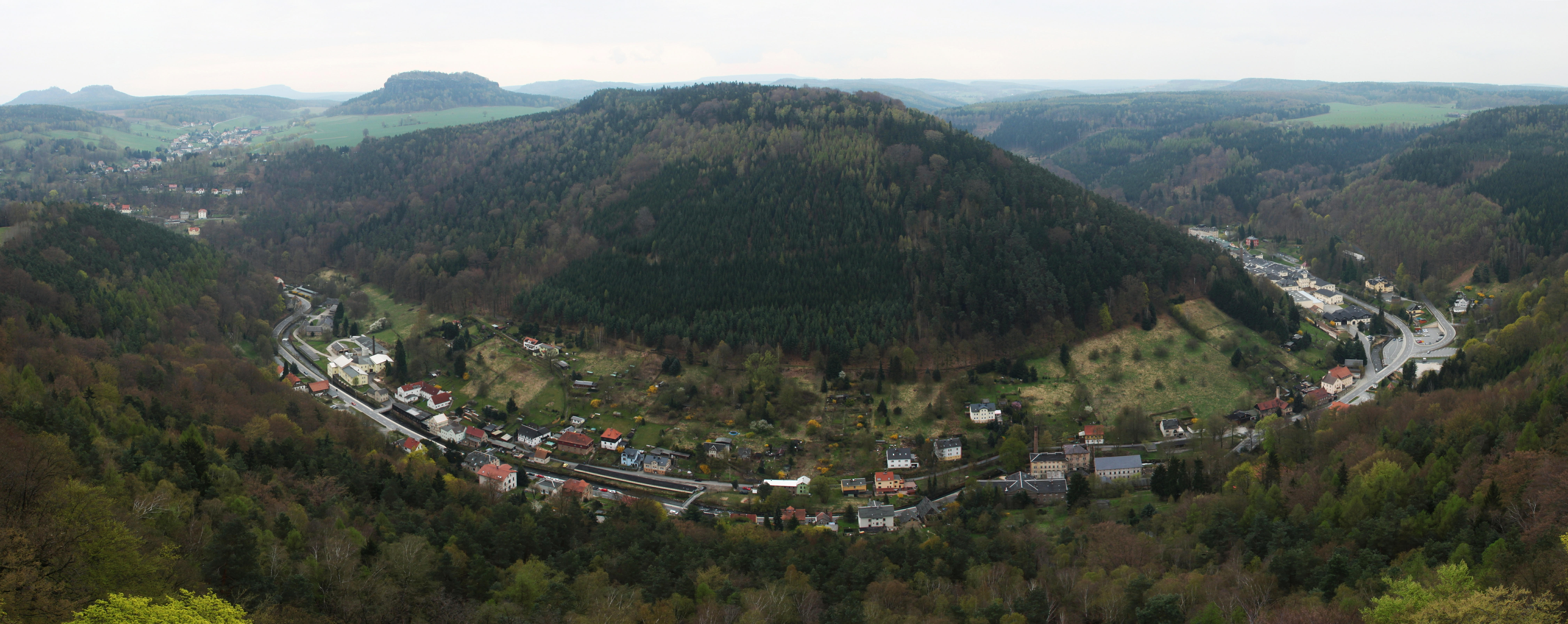
- View of the Quirl from Königstein Fortress

Highest point
- Elevation: 349.6 m above sea level (HN) (1,147 ft)
- Coordinates: 50°54′20″N 14°04′00″E

Geography
- Location within Saxony
- Location: Saxony, Germany
- Parent range: Elbe Sandstone Mountains

Geology
- Mountain type: Table hill
- Rock type: Sandstone

The Quirl is a low table hill, 349 metres high, in Saxon Switzerland, west of the River Elbe.

== Location and area ==
The Quirl rises about two kilometres south of Königstein in the so-called Land of Stones (Gebiet der Steine), part of Saxon Switzerland in which table hills (Tafelberge or Steine) are characteristic. In the immediate neighbourhood are the hills of Pfaffenstein and Königstein.

On the northern side of the Quirl is a large bedding cave, the Diebskeller ("Thieves' Cellar").

== History ==
Until around 1800 there were fields on the Quirl that belonged to the hereditary enfeoffed estate of Pfaffendorf. Later the Quirl was placed out of bounds to the public due to its proximity to Königstein Fortress and the fields were abandoned.

During the Austro-Prussian War of 1866 the old footpath to the summit plateau was blown up so that Prussian troops there could not emplace their guns there.

== Geology ==
The Quirl consists of sandstones of stage c, which are classified in the middle Turonian age of the Cretaceous in the geological time scale. In more recent publications these sandstones are also called Postelwitz Strata (Postelwitzer Schichten). The summit plateau corresponds to intermediate stratum γ3. The bedding caves on the north side of the Quirl are in the lightly weathered intermediate stratum γ2.

== Ascents ==
The best base for a visit to the Quirl is the town of Königstein. There a hiking trail, marked with a red dot runs around the Quirl an on to the neighbouring Pfaffenstein. An unmarked, but signposted branch, the Kanonenweg enables the summit plateau to be reached easily. Other unmarked ascents are located near the Diebskeller on the north side.

== Sources ==
- Gebiet Königstein, Sächsische Schweiz. Edition no. 1 Akademie-Verlag Berlin, Berlin 1957 (Werte der deutschen Heimat. Vol. 1).
- Roland H. Winkelhöfer: Der Quirl ohne Zweiffel. Eine Heimatkunde der 20 linkselbischen Tafelberge der Sächsischen Schweiz. Verlag DER HÖHLENFORSCHER, Dresden, ISBN 3-00-004380-2.
- Roland H. Winkelhöfer: Durch Höhlen der Sächsischen Schweiz. Höhlenführer und Katasterdokumentation. (1998 / 2010) Verlag DER HÖHLENFORSCHER, Dresden, ISBN 3-00-002609-6
