= Pfaffenstein =

Table hill in Elbe Sandstone Mountains

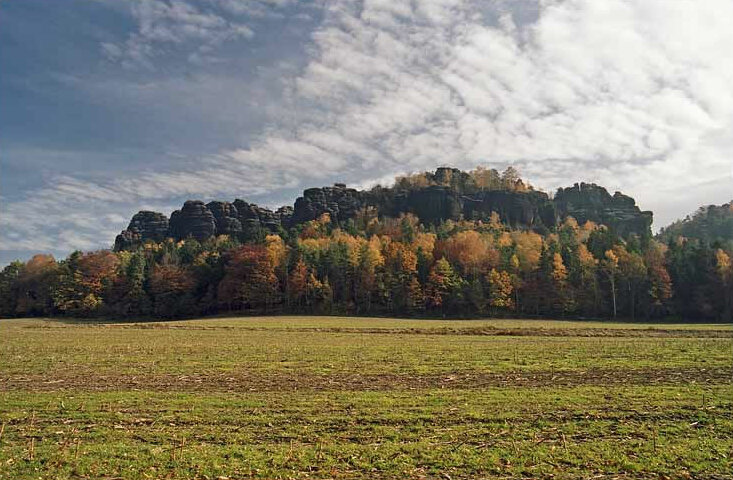
- The Pfaffenstein seen from the northwest (from the Quirl)

Highest point
- Elevation: 434.6 m (1,426 ft)
- Coordinates: 50°53′59″N 14°04′51″E

Geography
- Location within Saxony
- Location: Saxony (Germany)
- Parent range: Saxon Switzerland

Geology
- Mountain type: Table hill
- Rock type: Sandstone

The Pfaffenstein, formerly called the Jungfernstein, is a table hill, 434.6 m (1,426 ft) above sea level, in the Elbe Sandstone Mountains in Saxony. It lies west of the River Elbe near Königstein and is also referred to as "Saxon Switzerland in miniature" on account of its diverse structure.

The wild, jagged mountain with its numerous caves reveals traces of Stone and Bronze Age settlement and was later used frequently as a place of refuge during times of crisis as a result of its poor accessibility. Since the 19th century the Pfaffenstein has been developed for touristic purposes. The hill now boasts an inn, an observation tower, several viewing points and other places of interest on the mountain.

Since the early 20th century the massif of the Pfaffenstein has been used for rock climbing and, with its 32 rocks, is one of the most important climbing areas in Saxon Switzerland. The best-known rock and symbol of the Pfaffenstein is the Barbarine, a 43-metre-high (141 ft) rock pinnacle, that has been placed out of bounds to climbers since 1975 due to serious erosion damage.

== Location and area ==
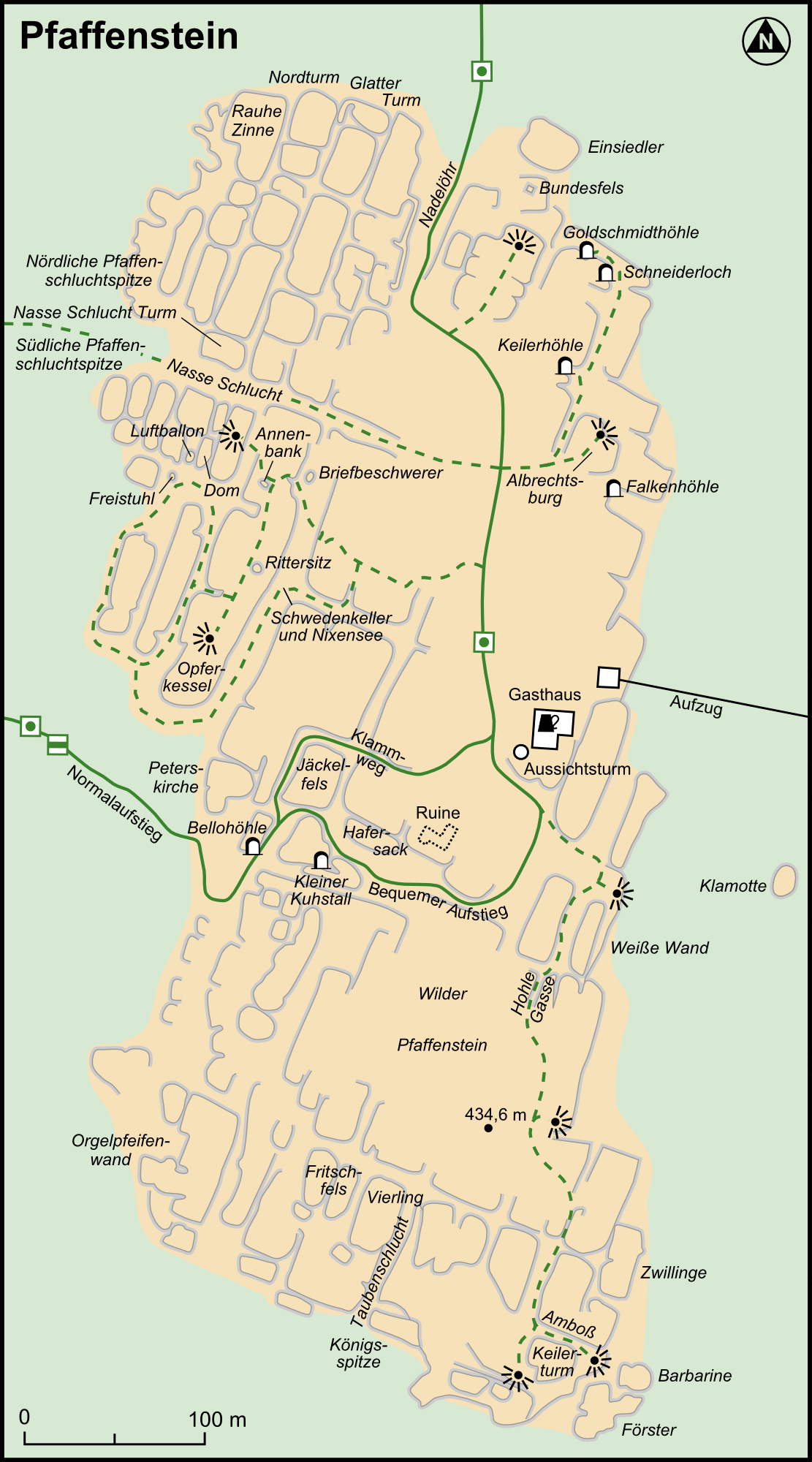
Map of the Pfaffenstein

The Pfaffenstein lies about 2 kilometres (1.2 mi) south of the village of Pfaffendorf in the borough of Königstein. Another nearby settlement is Cunnersdorf about 3 kilometres (1.9 mi) southeast. Its nearest neighbour is the 349.6-metre-high (1,147 ft) Quirl to the northwest, another table hill.

To the south, the mountain is surrounded by woods that drop away to the stream of Cunnersdorfer Bach. Around the northern part of the Pfaffenstein the land is predominantly used for agriculture.

The mountain looks like an elongated summit plateau running north-to-south for about 1 kilometre (0.62 mi), with a width of up to 400 metres (1,300 ft) from west-to-east. It has an area of some twelve hectares and rises about 100 metres (330 ft) above the surrounding countryside. The actual summit lies in the southern part of the plateau. The edge of the Pfaffenstein is formed by rugged and heavily fissured sandstone rocks. There are numerous isolated rock formations around the main massif, the best-known being the Barbarine on the southern tip of the Pfaffenstein. Other significant rock pinnacles are the Königspitze, the Förster, the Bundesfels, the Rauhe Zinne, the Jäckelfels, the Pfaffenschluchtspitzen, the Peterskirche and the Einsiedler.

== Origin of the name and legends ==
The name Pfaffenstein is very probably derived from the nearby village of Pfaffendorf. This settlement in the borough of Königstein was given its name because its inhabitants paid taxes to the church at Königstein in the Middle Ages, as evinced by the first mention of the village's name in the records in 1437. Its old name of Jungfernstein ("Virgin Rock") comes from a legend about the origin of the Barbarine rock pinnacle, according to which a woman sent her daughter to church on Sundays. However, when she caught her picking bilberries on the Pfaffenstein instead, the mother cursed her daughter, turning her to stone.

== History ==
=== Early history ===
The plateau of the Pfaffenstein had already been settled by about 3,000 years ago. Archaeological excavations unearthed both Stone Age and Bronze Age artefacts of the Lusatian Culture. On the plateau, near the present hilltop inn, various stone flat axes, clay vessels, a grinding stone and the site of a hearth came to light during digs from 1896 to 1912. In 1921 the innkeeper, Richard Keiler, found two bronze bangles. Other excavations were carried out on the plateau in 1967; they confirmed the settlement as being part of the Lusatian Culture. The diggers found more ceramic artefacts and a whetstone.

The site was probably one of the oldest fortifications of the Lusatian Culture. The only prehistoric relic still visible today is the semi-circular rampart, also dating to the Bronze Age, on the western side of the Pfaffenstein near the Bequemer Aufstieg trail. The 200-metre-long (660 ft) embankment probably guarded the only entrance to the plateau and was surrounded by a ditch. Archaeological investigations in 1959 and 1961 estimated its age at about 3,000 years. More pieces of ceramic were discovered inside the rampart.

=== Early Modern Era ===
The Pfaffenstein was first mentioned in the records in 1548: the official probate register of Pirna recording in that year the right of Pfaffendorf farmers to use the Pfaffenstein for grazing and wood gathering. The Pfaffenstein was also used in times of war by the villagers of Pfaffendorf as a refuge and hideaway for their cattle. During the Swedish invasion of 1706 a small hut was erected on the mountain for the Königstein senior forester. The local farmers last used the hill as a place of concealment during wartime in 1813, in this case the War of the Sixth Coalition against Napoleon. Even caves like the Kuhstall Cave must have been used as secret hideaways. However, apart from wartime, the Pfaffenstein had few visitors and those were mainly the electorate's appointed hunters who are probably responsible for the dates "1702" and "1714" scrawled in the Schwedenkeller and on the Bequemer Aufstieg.

On the eastern side of the hill a large rock face collapsed in 1838. One of the piles of rubble at the foot of the cliff is the present-day climbing area of Klamotte. The resulting fresh rock face is visible a long way off and is called the Weiße Wand ("White Wall") on account of its light-coloured, relatively unweathered surface.

=== First tourist activity in the 19th century ===
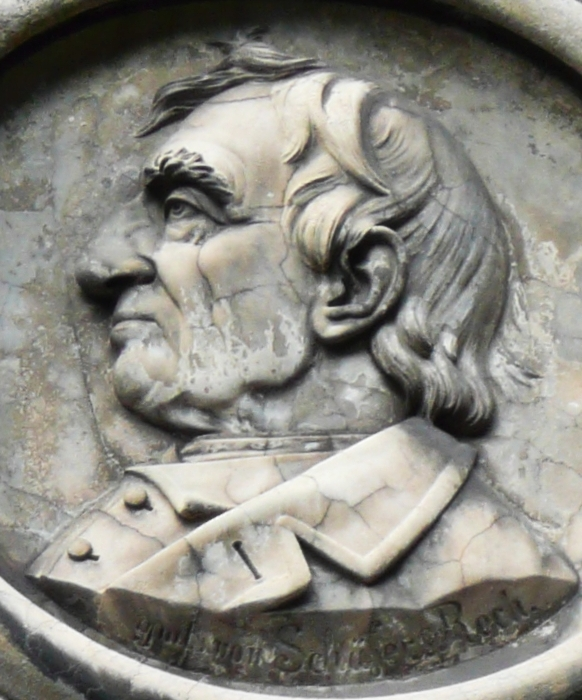
Carl Gottlob Jäckel (1803-1882), pioneer of tourism on the Pfaffenstein (part of the marble medallion on the Jäckelfels)

Carl Gottlob Jäckel (1803–1882) pioneered the exploitation of the Pfaffenstein for tourism in modern times. His good local knowledge made him a trusted tour guide and the locals referred to him as the "Mountain Spirit of the Pfaffenstein" (Berggeist vom Pfaffenstein) or the Rübezahl of the Pfaffenstein. He planned and led the establishment of the first trails and rediscovered the Kuhstall Cave. In 1881 a marble medallion was placed on the Jäckelfels, a crag named in his honour. The medallion has a life-sized head and shoulders relief with the inscription "The explorer and guardian of the Pfaffenstein, Mr. Karl Gottlob Jäckel honoured by the Fatherland. Alpine Club of Saxonia on 2 October 1881".

In 1852, at Jäckel's instigation, Carl Gottlieb Kliemann from Pfaffendorf established the first, small inn on the hill in a cattle stall. Kliemann also blazed the first trails to various viewing points and notable rock formations.

Supported by his brother-in-law Kliemann, probably out of self-interest, Friedrich Eduard Goldschmidt, a lithographer and counterfeiter who had escaped from prison in Königstein on the night of 27 September 1854, forged Anhalt-Dessau five gulden notes in a cave near the cattle hut. It is commonly assumed that it was the cave that now bears his name, Goldschmidt Cave, however, it is possible that he hid in the rather drier Falken Cave. Another theory is that he only went to the cave during the day, but used to stay overnight in his brother-in-law's hut. Goldschmidt was arrested in Dresden at the end of November 1854. A court sentenced Goldschmidt, his brother-in-law Kliemann and other accomplices to jail; the Kliemann inn was then demolished.

In the time that followed, the hill was gradually made more accessible. An unknown visitor in 1863 had a stone bench hewn out of a rock. In 1878/1879 Carl Gottlob Jäckel established the first relatively accessible trail roughly along the line of the present day Bequemer Aufstieg. In order to be able to cater for visitors, in 1880 Paul Ulbrich, the innkeeper of the Pfaffendorf Inn, built a new summer restaurant on the site of the old hut, once again at the suggestion of Jäckel. It was replaced in 1891 by a stone building on the site of the present hilltop restaurant.

=== Fundamental changes around 1900 ===
The Widow Ulbrich sold the inn in 1895 to the Keiler family, who ran it for three generations until 1990. Hermann Keiler extended the inn between 1897 and 1904, giving it its present appearance. Until 1912 everything had to be laboriously carried up the hill, as a result it was decided to build a material lift which is still working today.

Hermann Keiler, who had already purchased three plots of land on the hill, originally rented land from several other owners of the hill in order to offer visitors access to the rock formations. Finally he and his son bought as many of the plots as possible, so that the family ended up owning eleven of the twelve hectares of the plateau.

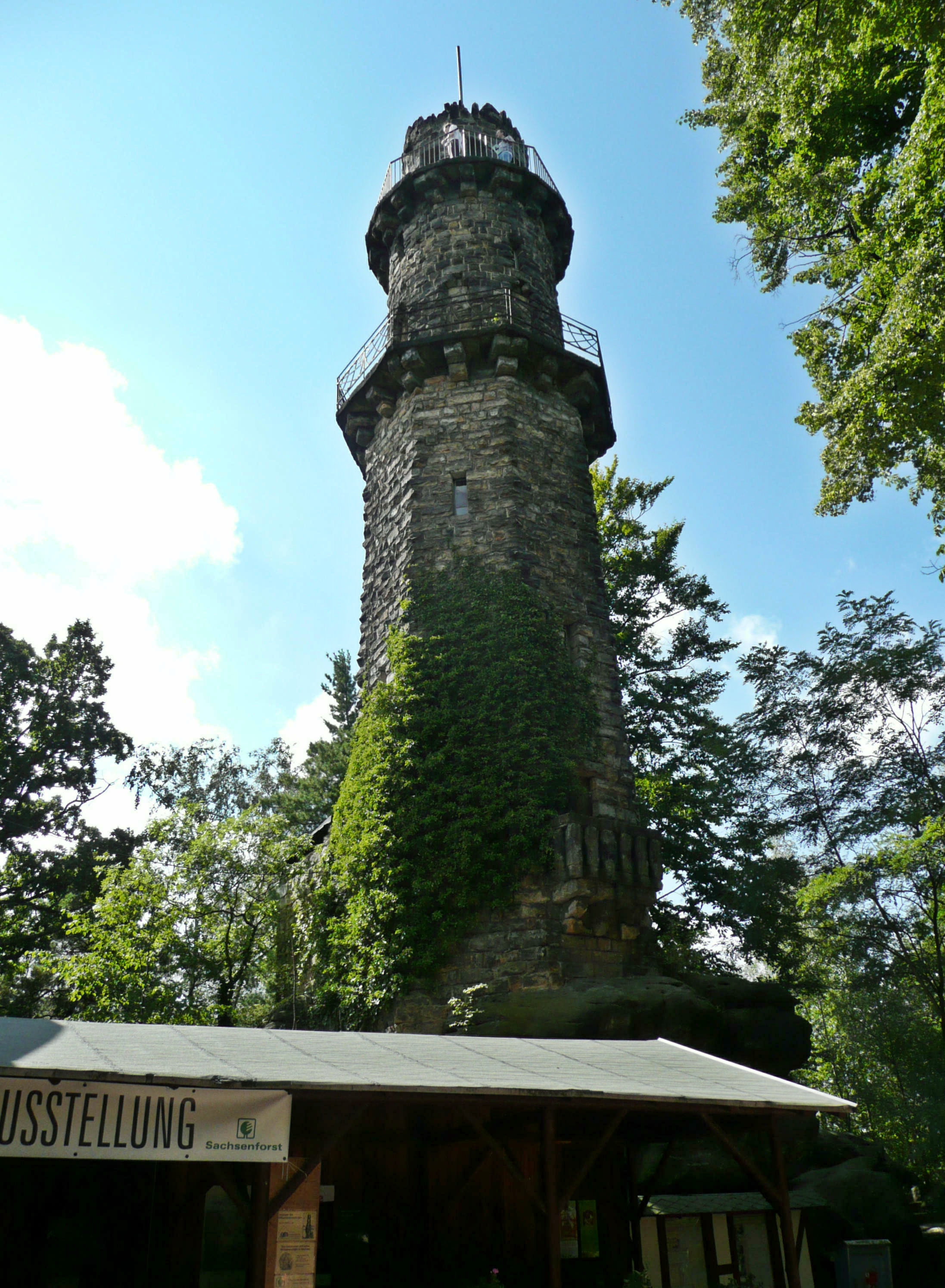
The observation tower on the Pfaffenstein (2008)

The first wooden observation tower was inaugurated on 2 September 1894 and offered a comprehensive all-round view from the Pfaffenstein, unimpeded by trees. Its construction was funded by the widow, Mrs Ulbrich. Because the tower had become dilapidated, the new tenant, Hermann Keiler, had it torn down in 1904 and replaced by a new structure made of sandstone. Under the direction of master builder Naumann from Königstein the new tower was ready by the spring. The requisite stone was cut on the site during the winter; all other materials, such as limestone, roof slates, windows and doors had to be painstakingly carried up the hill. On 7 August 1904 the 29-metre-high (95 ft) tower was consecrated by the priest, Hoyer, from Königstein.

To improve access, the Nadelöhr was opened in 1897. About the same time the hill began to be used for recreational climbing, the most important steps being the first ascents of the Nordturm in 1900 and the Barbarine in 1905. Another easy trail up to the Pfaffenstein, the Klammweg, was blazed in 1913. An indication of the popularity of the hill was the visit in 1915 of the Saxon king, Frederick Augustus III, who climbed the Pfaffenstein with his daughters and stopped by at the hilltop inn.

=== 20th century ===
After being damaged by a lightning strike in 1944 and suffering badly from the resulting erosion, the head of the Barbarine had to be reinforced more than once. Since 1975 it has been out of bounds to climbers, in order to preserve the rock.

In 1992 the state of Saxony purchased the land on the Pfaffenstein from the Keiler family for 2.9 million DM for the Saxon Switzerland Conservation Association. In 1993 the inn also went into the ownership of the association. The observation tower was reopened again in 1995 after renovation.

On 26 June 1997 the nature reserve created in 1990 was further extended. Several places of interest may now only be accessed for sport climbing, including the Dom, the Königsgarten and the Nasse Schlucht.

== Sources ==
- Deichmüller, Johannes (1897, 1898). Eine vorgeschichtliche Niederlassung auf dem Pfaffenstein in der Sächsischen Schweiz. In: Sitzungsberichte und Abhandlungen der Naturwissenschaftlichen Gesellschaft ISIS in Dresden, 1897 (July–December), Dresden 1898, p. 73–79. (digitalised)
- Deichmüller, Johannes (1907). Der Pfaffenstein. In: Alfred Meiche (publ.): Die Burgen und vorgeschichtlichen Wohnstätten in der Sächsischen Schweiz, Dresden, p. 8–14.
- Keiler, Ralph (2004) (with articles by Ulrich Augst, Dieter Beeger, Albrecht Kittler, Alfred Neugebauer, Holm Riebe, Peter Rölke, Klaus Schneider): Der Pfaffenstein. Berg- & Naturverlag Rölke, Dresden, ISBN 3-934514-15-4.
- Klenke, Friedemann (2008). Naturschutzgebiete in Sachsen Staatsministerium für Umwelt und Landwirtschaft, Dresden, ISBN 3-932627-17-2.
- Neugebauer, Alfred and Beeger, Dieter (1986). Pfaffenstein und Neurathen. Pirna.
- Torke, Matthias (2008). Zur Interpretation urgeschichtlicher Funde vom Pfaffenstein. In: Arbeitskreis Sächsische Schweiz im Landesverband Sächsischer Heimatschutz (publ.): Mitteilungen. Heft 8. Pirna, p. 19–72.
