= Kleiner Zschirnstein =

Mountain in Saxony, Germany

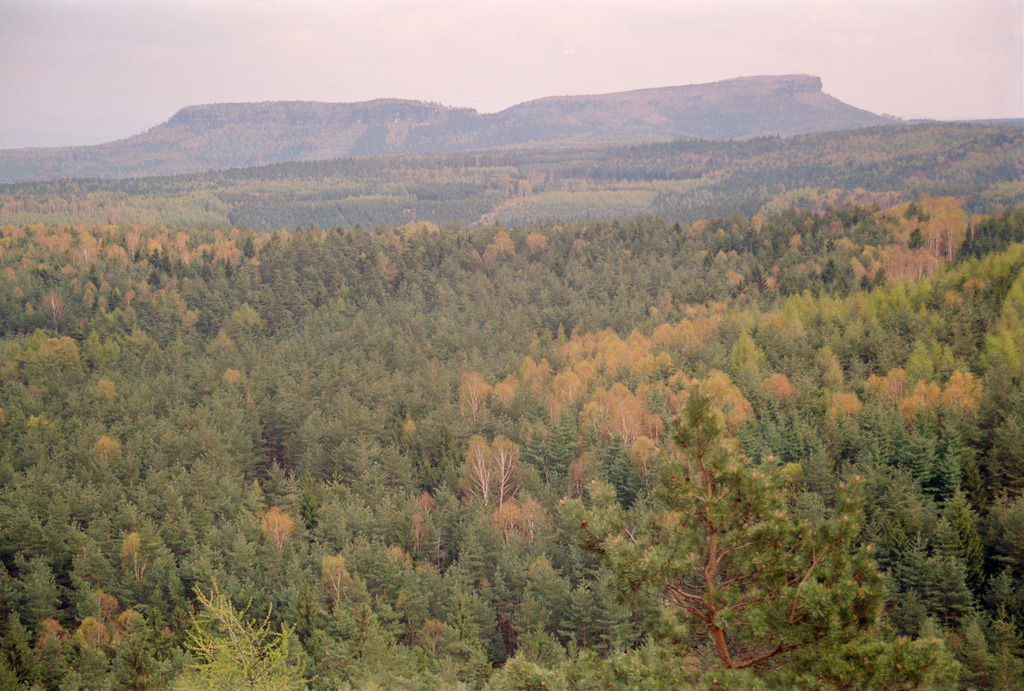
- The Zschirnsteine. Left: Little Zschirnstein, right: Great Zschirnstein

Highest point
- Elevation: 472.7 m above sea level (HN) (1,551 ft)
- Listing: Mountains and hills of Saxony
- Coordinates: 50°52′16″N 14°10′13″E

Geography
- Location within Saxony Location within Germany
- Country: Germany
- State: Saxony
- Parent range: Saxon Switzerland

Geology
- Mountain type: Table hill
- Rock type: Sandstone

The Kleine Zschirnstein ("Little Zschirnstein") is a 472.7-metre-high (1,551 ft) table hill in the Elbe Sandstone Mountains in Saxony.

It is located north of the Großer Zschirnstein above the village of Kleingießhübel. The summit plateau rises gently from east to west and is covered in forest. Whilst the southern end of the table descends gradually, there are steep rock faces on the northern side with several free-standing climbing summits. From the top there is an extensive view into Saxon-Bohemian Switzerland.
