= Zschirnsteine =

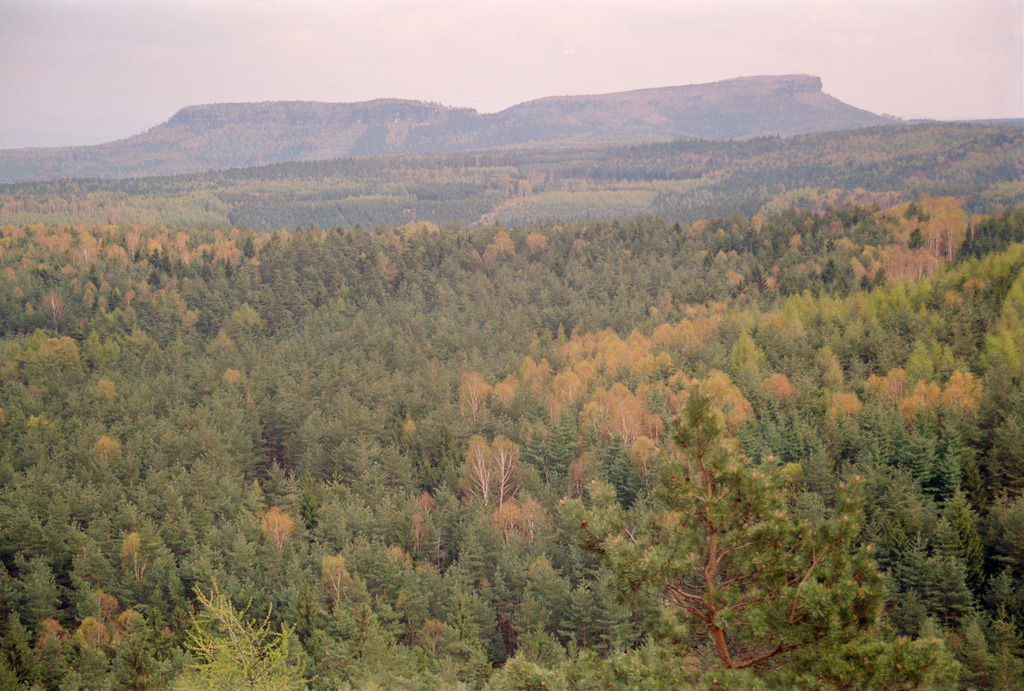
- The Zschirnsteine. Left: Kleiner Zschirnstein, right: Großer Zschirnstein

Highest point
- Elevation: 561 m above sea level (HN) (1,551 ft)
- Coordinates: 50°52′16″N 14°10′13″E

Geography
- Location within Saxony
- Location: Saxony (Germany)
- Parent range: Saxon Switzerland

Geology
- Mountain type: Table hill
- Rock type: Sandstone

The Zschirnsteine are two prominent table hills in the German part of the Elbe Sandstone Mountains. They are located in the municipality of Reinhardtsdorf-Schöna, about 7 km south of the German resort of Bad Schandau. They lie west of the River Elbe and not far north of the Czech border.

The 561 m high Großer Zschirnstein ("Great Zschirnstein") is the highest hill in Saxon Switzerland.

The Kleiner Zschirnstein ("Little Zschirnstein") is also a sandstone table hill. It is 473 m high and lies north of the Großer Zschirnstein.

Both tables lie in the midst of a forest and may be climbed on foot. They offer extensive views of the Elbe Sandstone Mountains and beyond. A good base for walking to the hills is the Panoramahotel Wolfsberg near the village of Reinhardtsdorf.

== Literatur ==
- Zwischen Sebnitz, Hinterhermsdorf und den Zschirnsteinen. Edition no. 1 Akademie-Verlag Berlin, Berlin 1959 (Werte der deutschen Heimat. Vol. 2).

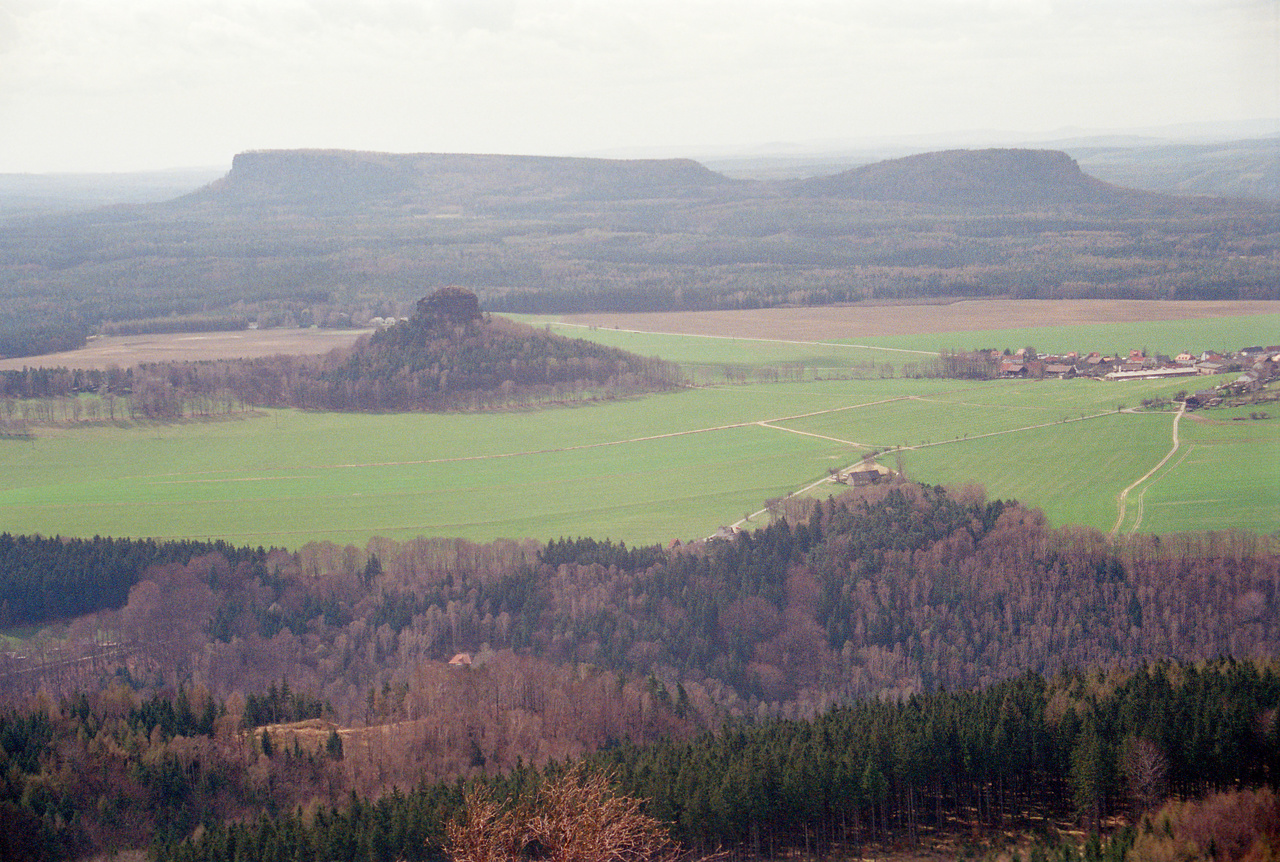
The Zschirnsteine from the side of the Großer Winterberg (Kipphorn viewing point). Left: the Great Zschirnstein; right: the Little Zschirnstein. In the foreground is the Zirkelstein
