= Kaiserkrone (hill) =

Hill in Saxony, Germany

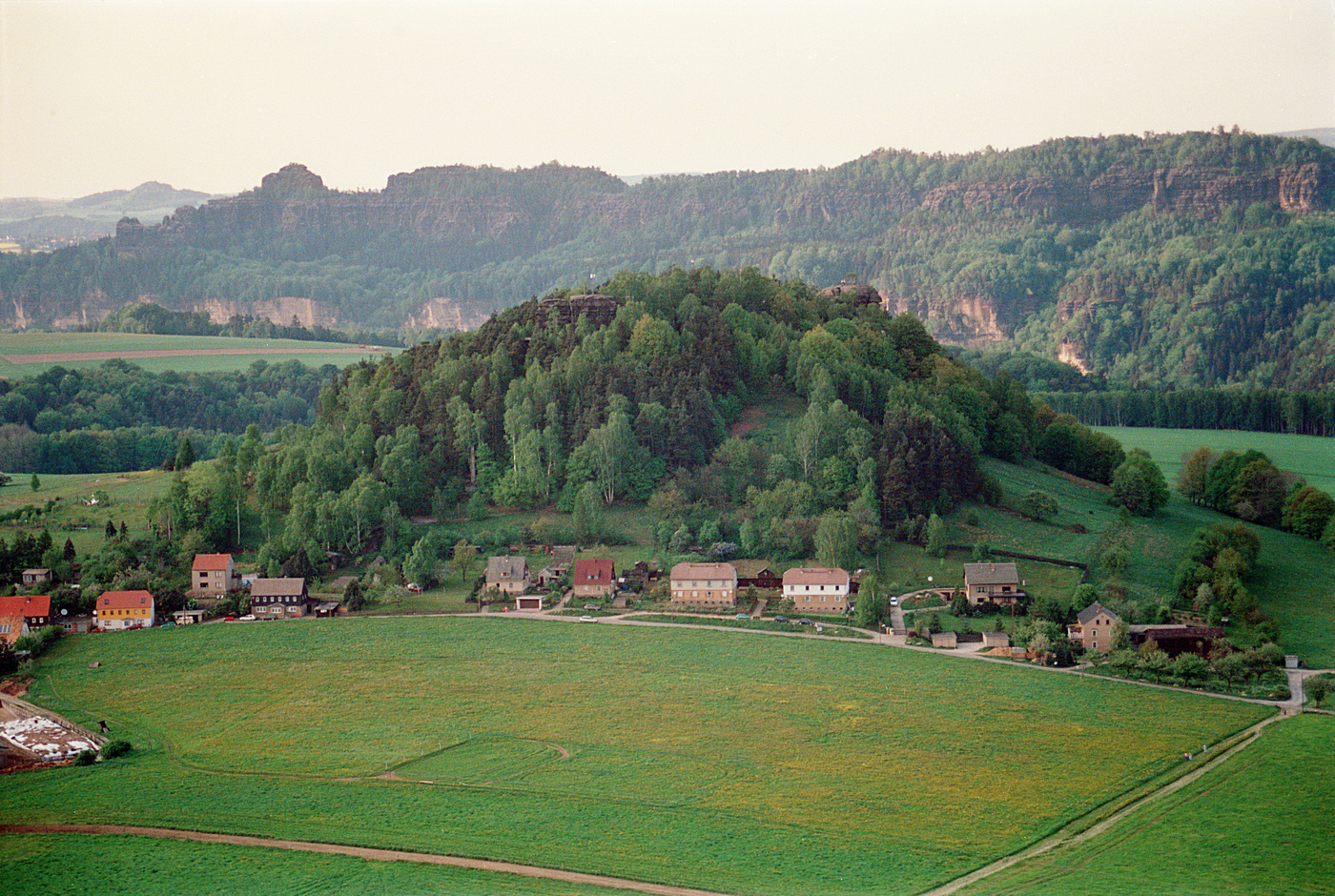
- View of the Kaiserkrone from the Zirkelstein

Highest point
- Elevation: 350.8 m above sea level (HN) (1,151 ft)
- Coordinates: 50°53′10″N 14°13′05″E

Geography
- Location within Saxony
- Location: Saxony (Germany)
- Parent range: Elbe Sandstone Mountains

Geology
- Rock age: Upper Turonian
- Mountain type: Sandstone Stage c3

The Kaiserkrone is a heavily abraded and jagged remains of a table hill that, together with the Zirkelstein, rises above the level plain of Schöna, immediately on the outskirts of the village in the Elbe Sandstone Mountains in the German state of Saxony.

The name "Kaiserkrone" means "imperial crown" and is derived from its appearance. The three points of the crown, each of which may be climbed, are part of the large sandstone step known as "c3", from the Upper Turonian stage, and were left behind as the wide rock crevices between them were formed. Mankind has also been involved in the formation or destruction of the plateau which is 350.8 m above sea level (NN). At the southern end of the rocks, two lions have been carved by unknown artists.

At the beginning of the 19th century, the Kaiserkrone was also known by other names like the Kahlstein, Zahnstein or Kronenberg. Even older designations are Galitzstein (end of the 16th century), Golzenstein (end of the 18th century) and Gollstein (early 19th century).

At the southern foot of the Kaiserkrone there are several sandstone rocks of unusual shape that were rediscovered in the sketch book of Caspar David Friedrich, which he drew during a visit to the Kaiserkrone and later used as the undercoat for his painting Der Wanderer über dem Nebelmeer.

== Gallery ==
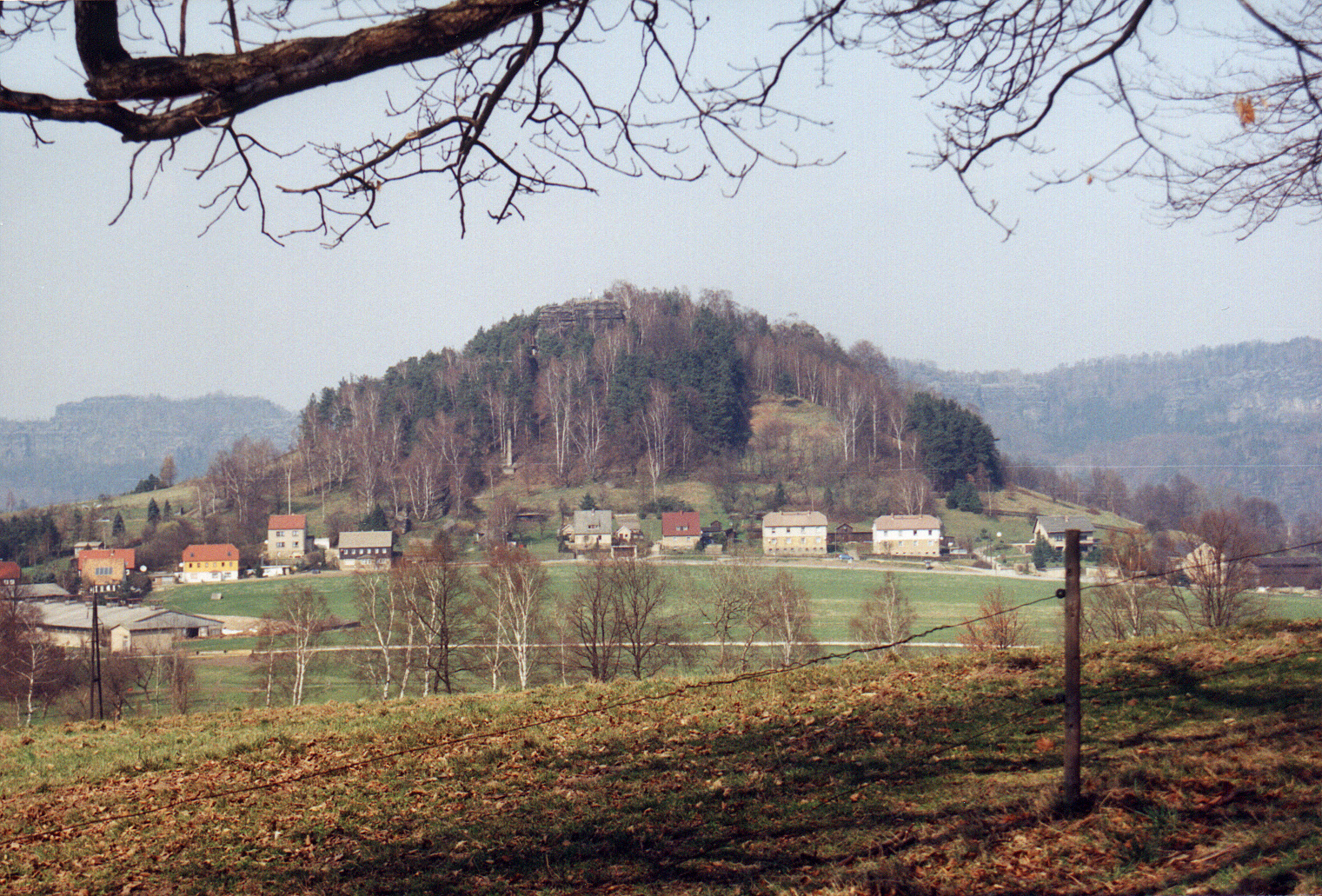
The Kaiserkrone from the foot of the Zirkelstein

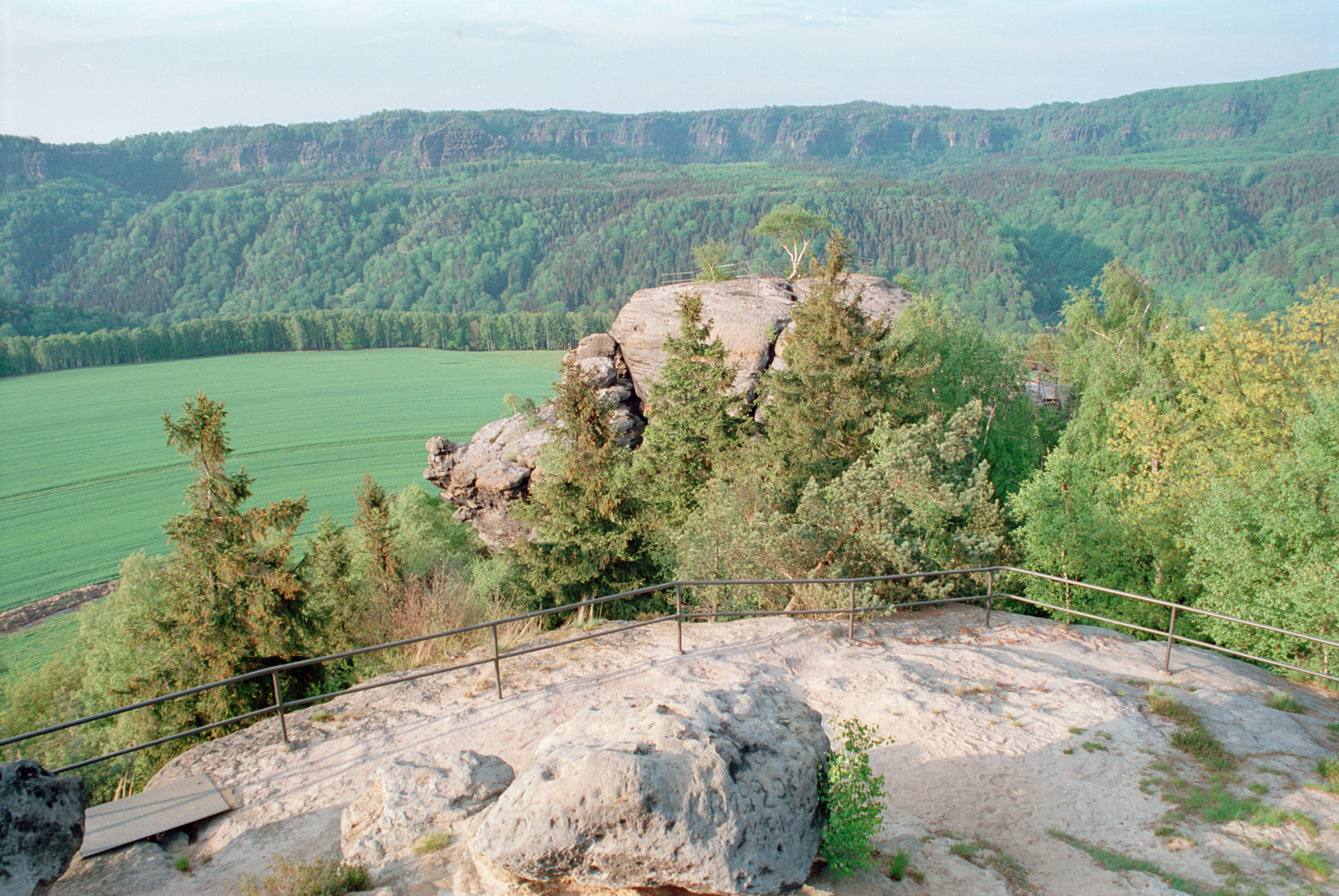
On one of the jags of the Kaiserkrone

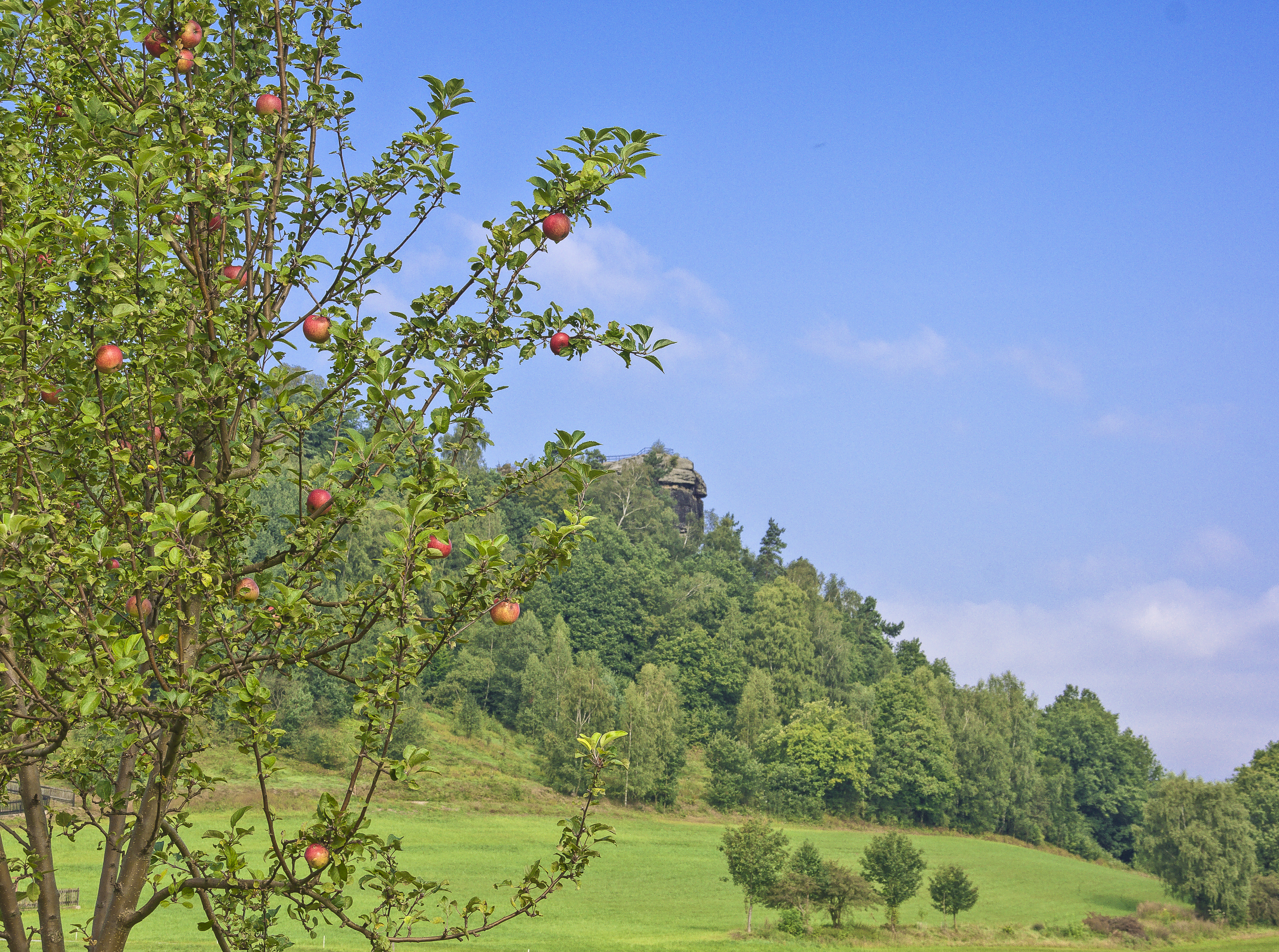
Kaiserkrone
