= Reinhardtsdorf-Schöna =

- Municipality
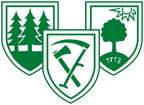
- Coat of arms

- Location of Reinhardtsdorf-Schöna within Sächsische Schweiz-Osterzgebirge district
- Interactive map of Reinhardtsdorf-Schöna
- Location within Germany Location within Saxony
- Coordinates: 50°54′N 14°12′E
- Country: Germany
- State: Saxony
- District: Sächsische Schweiz-Osterzgebirge
- Subdivisions: 3

Government
  - Mayor (2020–27): Andreas Heine

Area
  - Total: 31.75 km^{2} (12.26 sq mi)
- Elevation: 281 m (922 ft)

Population (2025-12-31)
  - Total: 1,252
  - Density: 39.43/km^{2} (102.1/sq mi)
- Time zone: UTC+01:00 (CET)
  - Summer (DST): UTC+02:00 (CEST)
- Postal codes: 01814
- Dialling codes: 035028
- Vehicle registration: PIR
- Website: www.reinhardtsdorf-schoena.de

Reinhardtsdorf-Schöna is a municipality in the Sächsische Schweiz-Osterzgebirge district in the German federal state of Saxony. It has a population of approximately 1,600 and is located close to the Czech border in Saxon Switzerland, a popular tourist region.

Reinhardtsdorf-Schöna encompasses the villages of Reinhardtsdorf, Schöna and Kleingießhübel. The municipality of Reinhardtsdorf-Schöna was formed in 1973 from the merger of these three parishes.

== History ==
=== Reinhardtsdorf ===
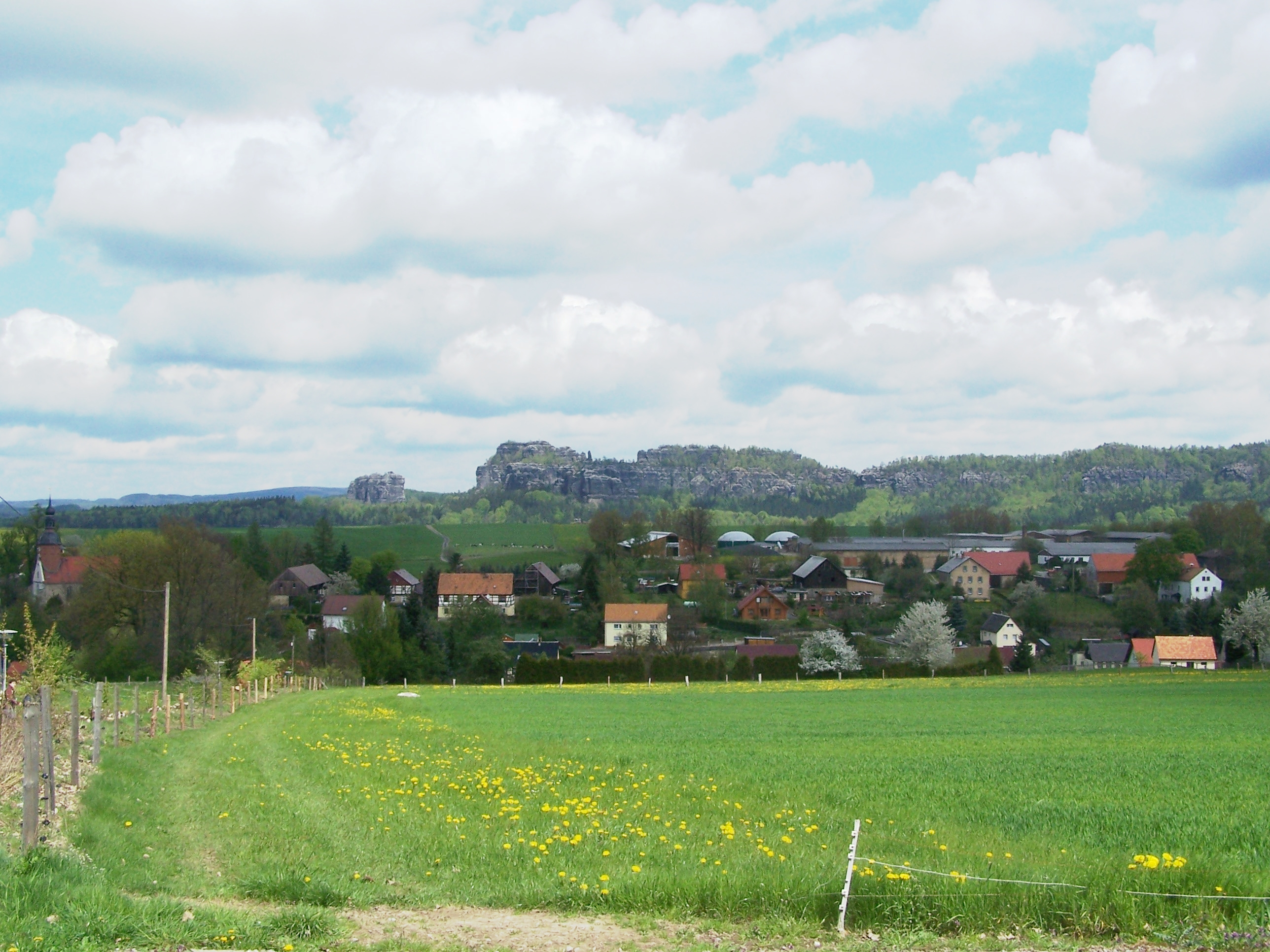
View of Reinhardtsdorf from the Wolfsberg. Background: the Schrammsteine

Reinhardtsdorf is a Waldhufendorf that was mentioned as long ago as 1368 and which used to be dominated by agriculture. Today the main source of economic income is tourism. South of the village lies an open-air pool, the Waldbad. Its Late Gothic church dates to the year 1523, its tower to 1685. Next to farmstead No. 7 stands an old, protected lime tree from about 1550. In house no. 21, and its barn there was an illegal printing press during the Nazi era, which is why it has become a listed building. In 2009 Reinhardtsdorf had 854 inhabitants (1999: 986).

=== Schöna ===
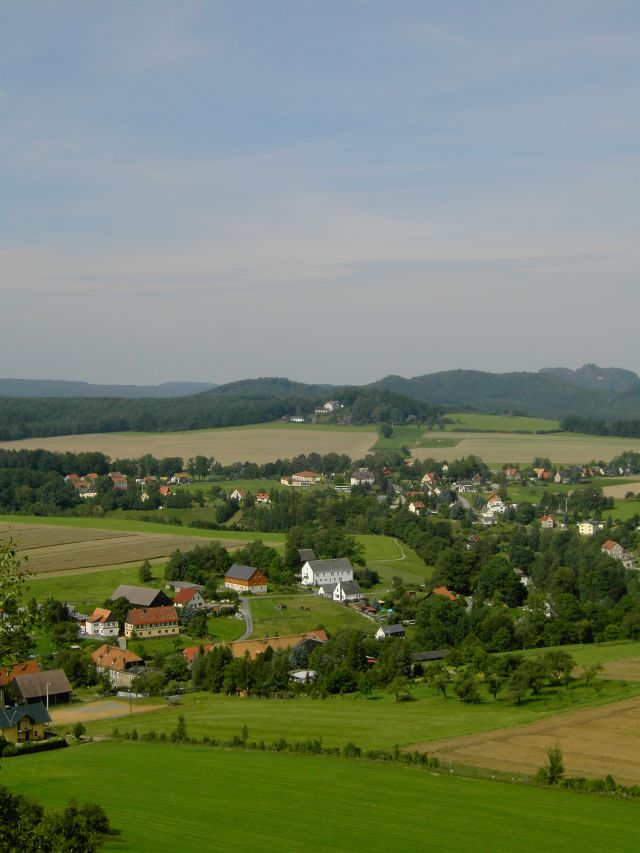
View of Schöna from the Kaiserkrone

Schöna lies at 280 m south of the River Elbe near the border with the Czech Republic. The old Waldhufendorf, first recorded in 1379, consists mainly of small cottages and old three-sided farmsteads. At the edge of the village of Schöna the Kaiserkrone towers above its surroundings and, somewhat further south is another hill, the Zirkelstein. The Hirschgrund valley runs down to the Elbe and the Hirsch Mill (Hirschmühle) and bisects the otherwise flat landscape of Schöna itself. Due to the copious quantities of water and steep gradient there used to be several mills in operation here. The few houses in the rather shaded and cool narrow valley belong to Schöna. In einem Upper Lusatian house in the high street is the Heimatstube Schöna, a local history museum with historic records of the life of the population in bygone centuries. In the northwest in the direction of the Großer Zschirnstein stands a prominent oak tree called "Kreusels Eiche".

An important son of the parish is Wilhelm Michael Schaffrath (1814–1893), a lawyer, state and imperial parliament representative. He was a delegate of the St. Paul's Church when it was a venue for the National Assembly in 1848. In 2009, Schöna had a population of 454 (1999: 565).

=== Kleingießhübel ===
Kleingießhübel was first recorded in 1379 as Gizobel. In addition to the mining of limonite on the Zschirnstein, the main source of income was the manufacture of pitch as a lubricant for wagons in the road to Děčín (formerly: Tetschen) that ran past the village.

== Places of interest ==
=== Reinhardtsdorf Church ===
The history of the church in Reinhardtdorf goes back to the first settlement around 1200 albeit first recorded in 1368. At the beginning of the 16th century it was expanded and in 1521 was given a Gothic winged altar. This carved altar with a portrayal of the Anna selbdritt was replaced when the church was renovated in 1681 by a baroque altar that depicted Jesus' Last Supper, his crucifixion and resurrection. The renovation also saw the construction of the tower. For a long time the Gothic altar was in a museum in Dresden and did not return to Reinhardtsdorf until January 1945, only a few days before the bombing of Dresden. It is now located next to the 1615 pulpit. From 1680 to 1711 the church was painted. The ceiling shows the Last Judgement and the Trinity, the upper storey, scenes from the Old Testament, mainly from the Book of Genesis, but also of the Exodus, of Samson, David und Elijah, the lower storey portrays the life of Jesus Christ. Under each painting is the name of the sponsor and the amount he donated. On the pews, Christian virtues and doctrine are portrayed graphically. The background to the paintings is the area around Reinhardtsdorf, the Elbe Sandstone Mountains. The church has an organ by Hermann Eule Orgelbau Bautzen from 1911.

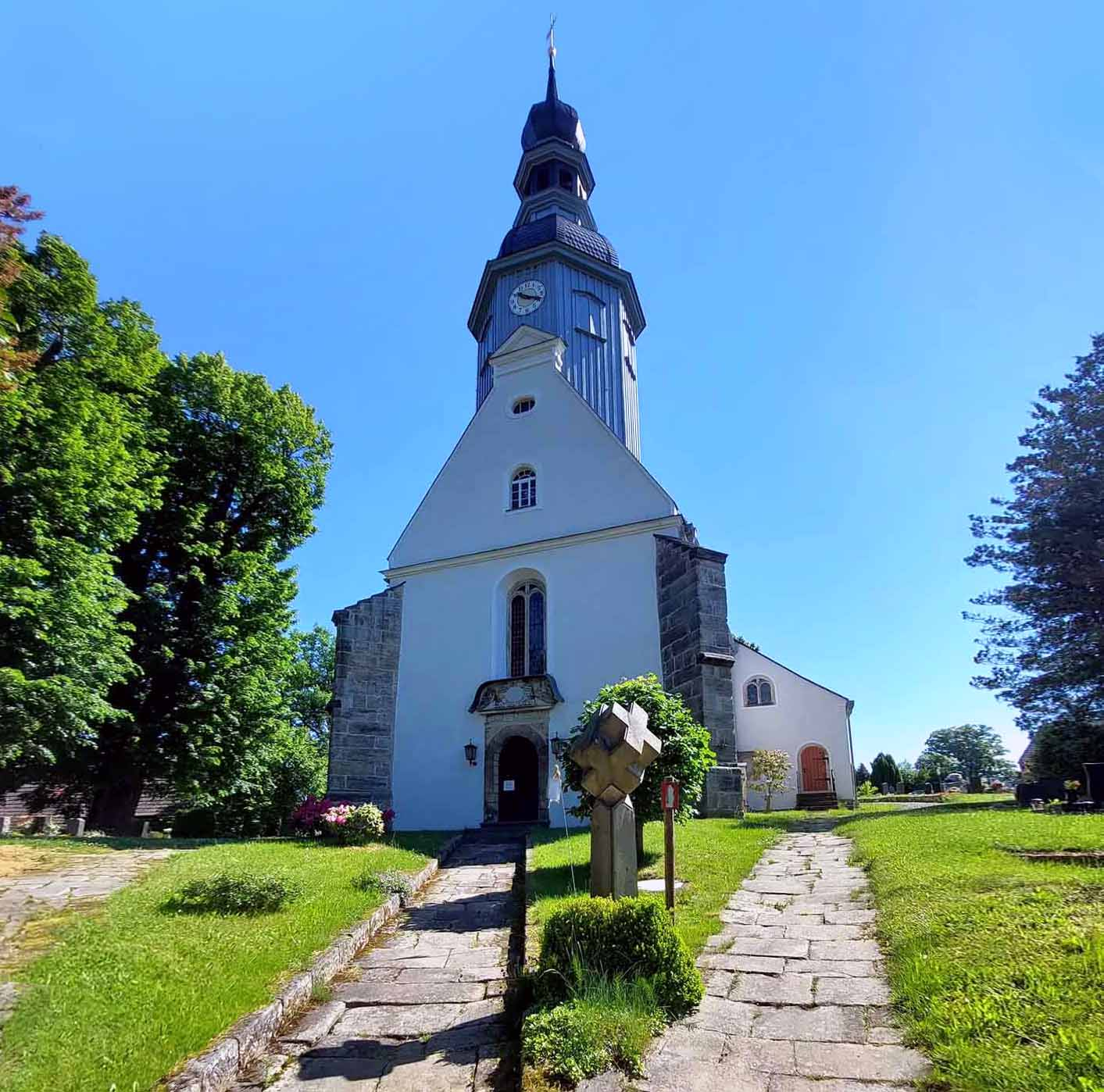

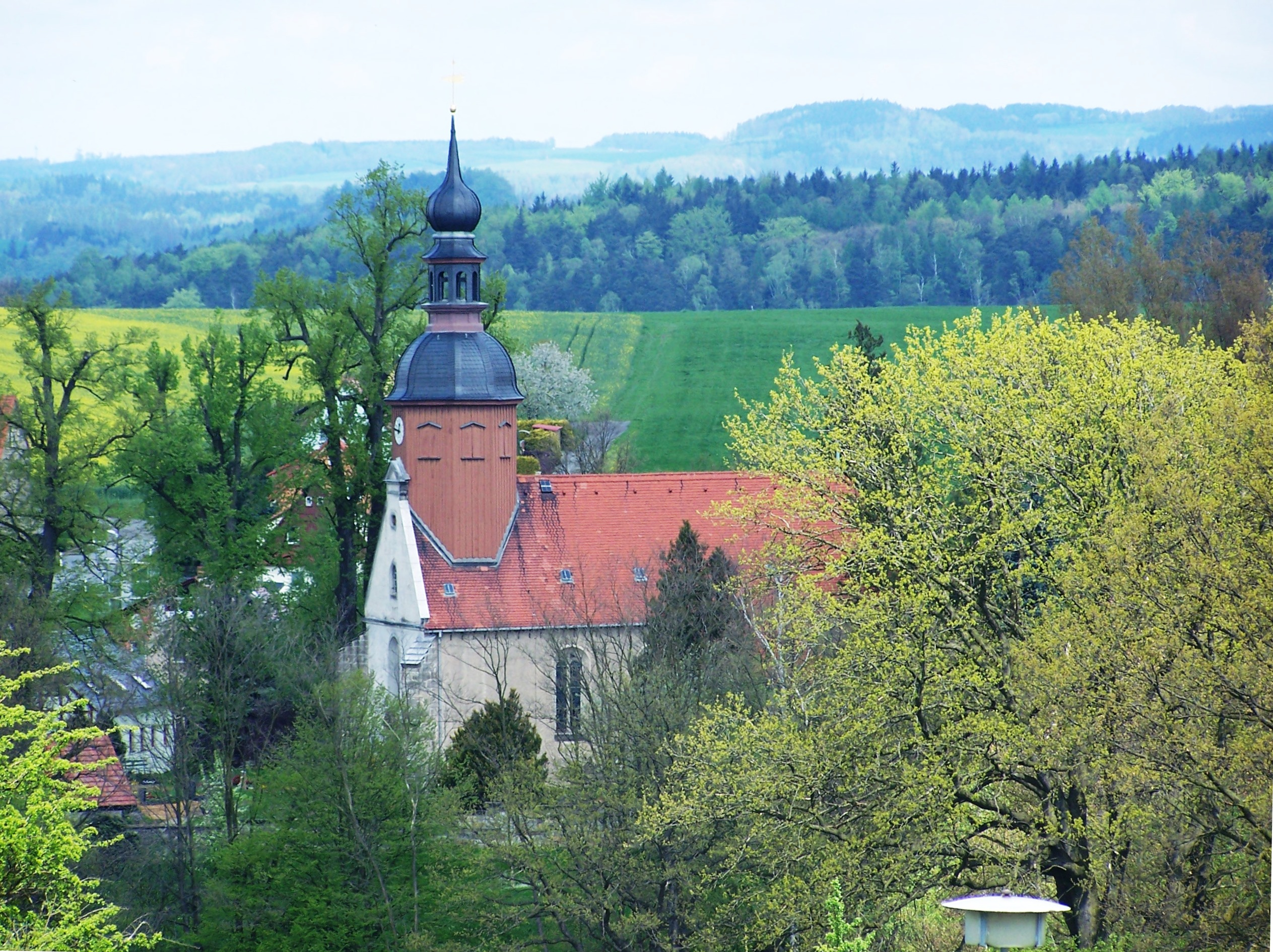
Rheinhardtsdorf Church

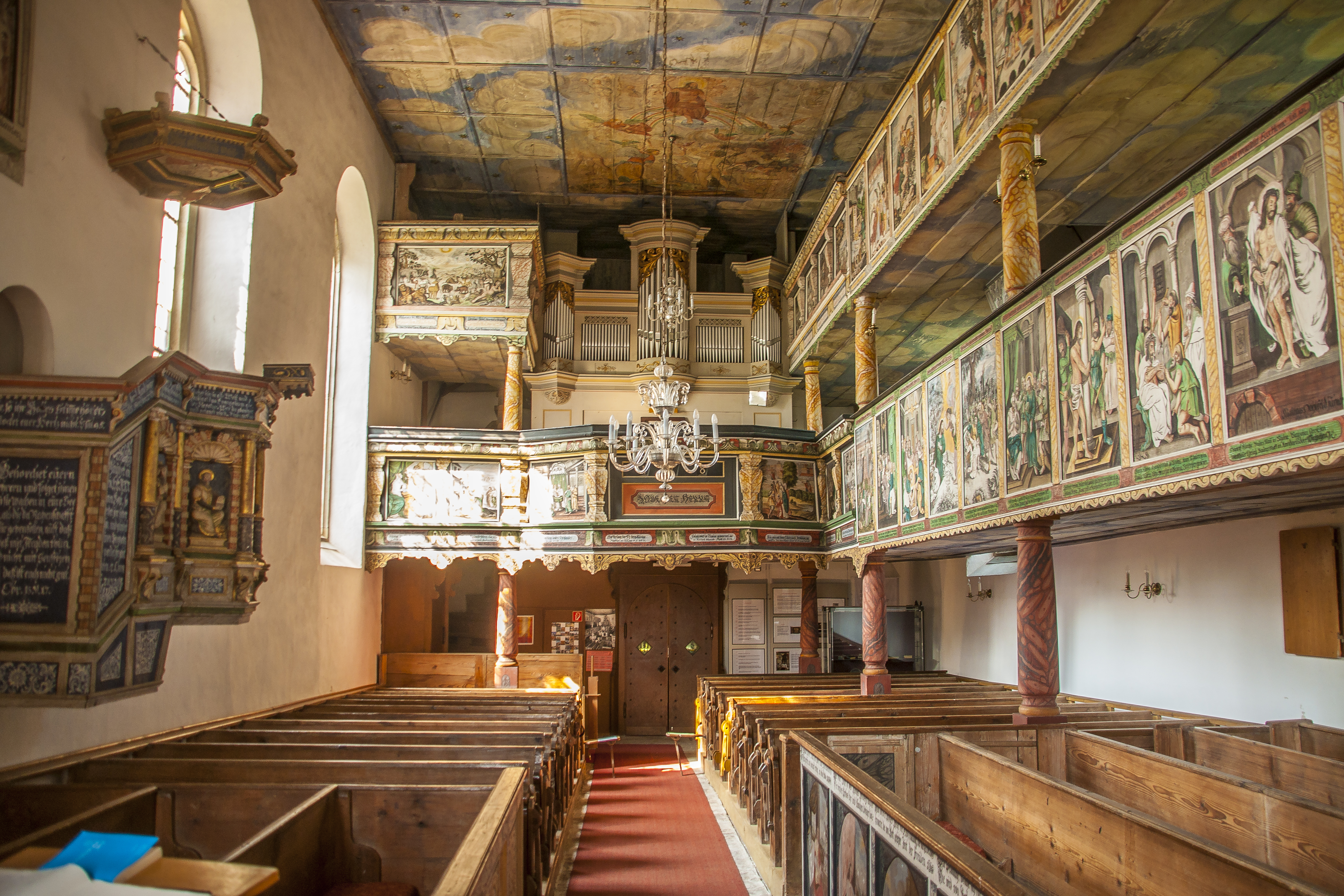
Inside Church

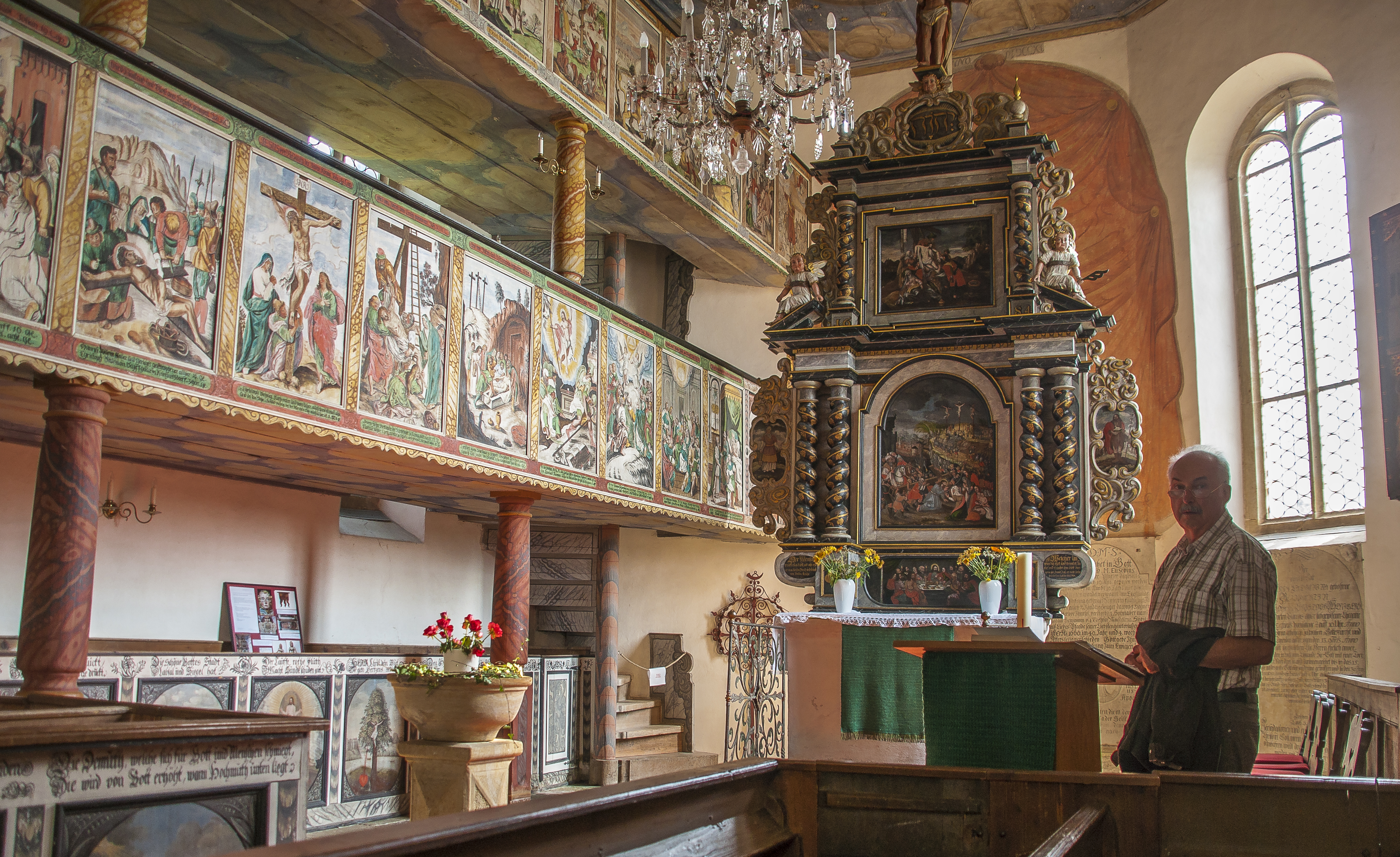
Inside Church

=== Memorials ===
- 1948 monument on the glazier's house (Glaserschmiede), house no. 50, for all victims of Fascism, and in particular for Nazi opponent, Bernhardt Geißler, who was murdered in 1940 at the Brandenburg Euthanasia Centre, for Walter Hering, who was murdered in 1937 at the Sonnenstein Euthanasia Clinic
- The Society of Nature House (Zirkelsteinhaus), no. 109 in East German days bore the name of the Jewish-Communist resistance fighter, Hans Dankner, who was murdered in 1944 at Auschwitz Concentration Camp

== Tourism ==
There are many activities to pursue here, including hiking, mountain biking and horse riding through the countryside. Reinhardtsdorf-Schöna is thus popular with German and international tourists and it is often difficult to find accommodation in peak season. Camping is an alternative.

Although tourism is a very important component of the local economy, there is still a great reliance on agriculture, with an emphasis on cereal grains as well as diversification into other crops such as Oilseed rape.

In a beeline to the northwest, it is 28 km to the outskirts of the city of Dresden.

English-speaking visitors will find it a challenge without some knowledge of German, but helpful for those wanting to practice their German. The concept of a two-week holiday to improve one's German, as is not uncommon in Poland, for example, is being considered by the Goethe Institute and their EU cultural partners. This may also include further development of the German courses made available by Deutsche Welle, so as to feature content that reflects aspects of life in Reinhardtsdorf-Schöna in detail and the region in general.

10 km in northwestern direction, on the far side of the River Elbe, the Rathen Rock Theatre is located. Here, dramatic reenactments of scenes from the famous western novels of Karl May are performed for tourists. Actors are dressed in period costumes, and a considerable amount of gun play and pyrotechnics use adds to the drama.

Berlin is approximately 175 km to the north. This is little more than a two-hour drive, traffic permitting, but there is also the option of taking straight InterCity and EuroCity trains from Bad Schandau or Dresden Hauptbahnhof to Berlin Hauptbahnhof. Travel times by train are usually between 2 and 3 hours, depending on the number of stops on the schedule, and the time of day or night.

14 km south of Reinhardtsdorf-Schöna, across the German-Czech border, lies the city of Děčín.

Whilst Reinhardtsdorf-Schöna is well placed compared to large urban areas in terms of employment, trade and tourism, for example, without having to worry unduly about overdevelopment that would spoil the local environment. That said, like any small town/village, there is a danger in it becoming simply a dormitory village, with little to encourage the younger generation to remain and earn a living.

== Environmental disasters ==
Reinhardtsdorf-Schöna, along with Bad Schandau and Pirna were damaged by the floods that happened Europe-wide in August 2002.

== See also ==
- Reinhardtsdorf Sandstone
- Schöna railway station
