= Zirkelstein =

Table hill in Germany

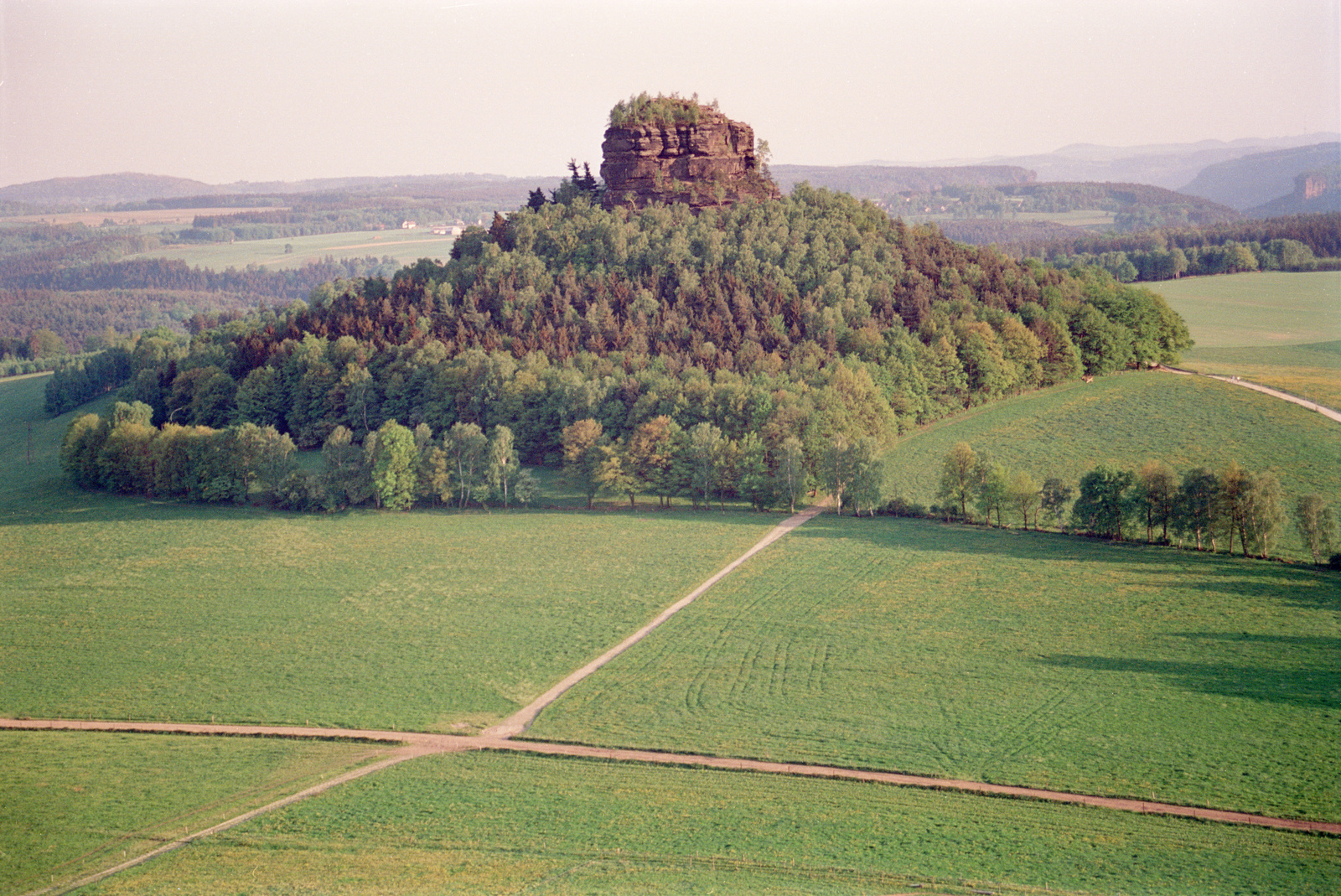
- View of the Zirkelstein from the Kaiserkrone

Highest point
- Elevation: 384.5 m above sea level (HN) (1,261 ft)
- Coordinates: 50°52′42″N 14°13′14″E

Geography
- Location within Saxony
- Location: Saxony (Germany)
- Parent range: Elbe Sandstone Mountains

Geology
- Mountain type: Table hill
- Rock type: Sandstone

The Zirkelstein is the smallest table hill of Saxon Switzerland, in Germany. It is a wooded, cone-shaped hill with a striking 40-metre-high (130 ft) summit block of sandstone rock.

== Location and area ==
The Zirkelstein is located five kilometres southeast of Bad Schandau in the part of Saxon Switzerland that lies left of the River Elbe. Immediately northwest of the hill is the village of Schöna in the municipality of Reinhardtsdorf-Schöna, whilst east of the hill – in the Elbe valley – is the municipality of Hřensko (Herrnskretschen), over the border in the Czech Republic. Immediately at the foot of the Zirkelstein is a former Friends of Nature house with a restaurant and a small bungalow village. The land of the Zirkelstein has been in private hands since 2008.

== History ==
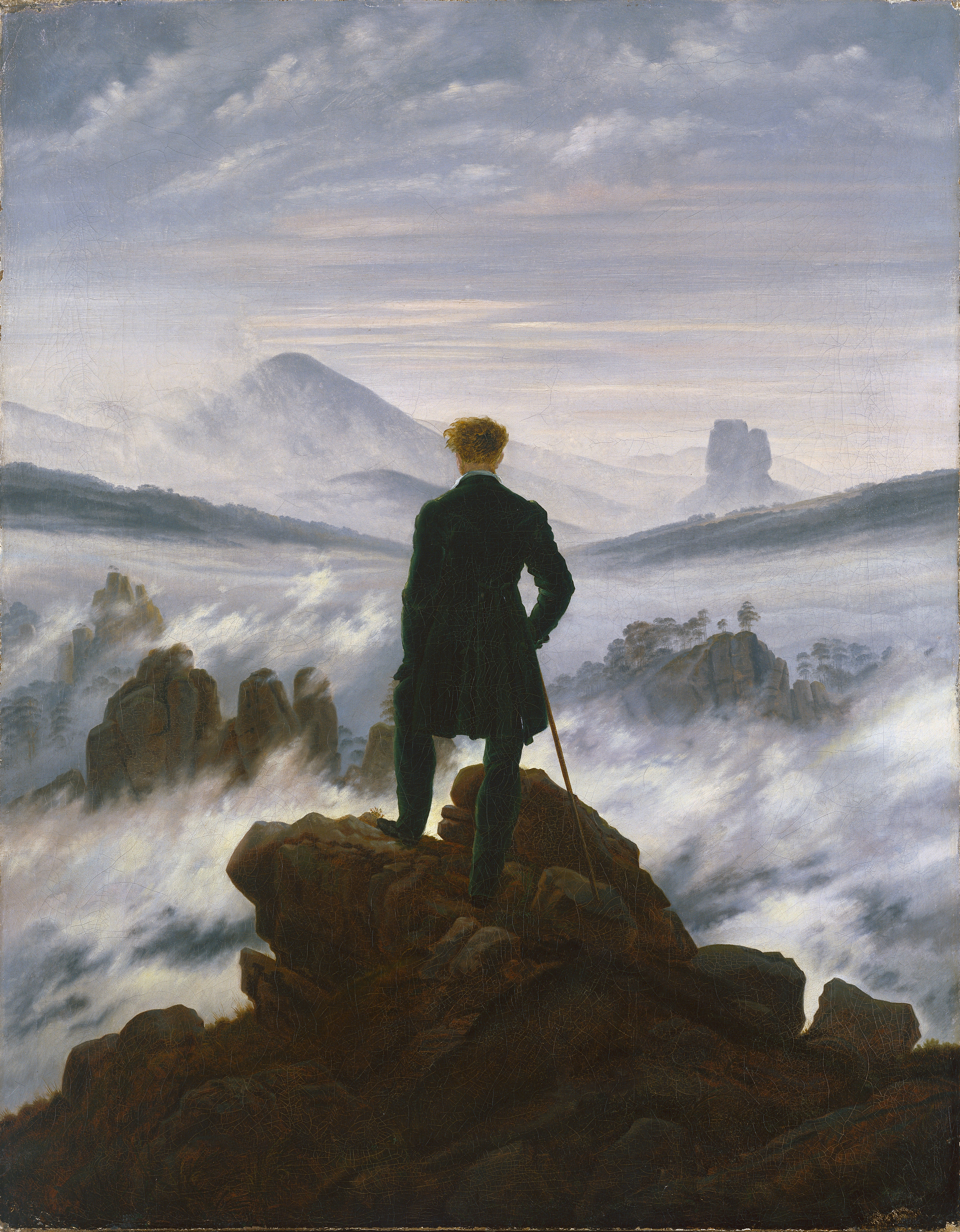
Caspar David Friedrich's Wanderer über dem Nebelmeer (Zirkelstein is on the right)

In 1841 the then owner of the hill, Johann Gottlob Füssel, built a small inn on the side of the Zirkelstein. In 1842 facilities were built to enable the summit to be made accessible to visitors. The inn was run by the family until 1913 and then the business was leased. On 3 September 1926 the inn was set on fire by lightning during a heavy thunderstorm and was razed to the ground.

Currently the hill, which has an area of 7 hectares, is owned by the ZirkelsteinResort gGmbH. The best-known painting of the Zirkelsteins is by Caspar David Friedrich. In the background of his 1818 painting, Der Wanderer über dem Nebelmeer, the hill appears in the background.

=== Name ===
The Zirkelstein gets its name from its characteristic shape that, from a distance, resembles a compass (German: Zirkel). In 1592 the hill was first mentioned, as the Circkelstein.

== Ascent ==
The Zirkelstein is best approached from Schöna along at yellow signed hiking trail. The summit itself may be gained using the metal steps and railings provided.

== Views ==
Due to its isolated situation the summit offers a comprehensive all-round view over the forests and crags of Saxon and Bohemian Switzerland and the Lusatian Mountains.

== Gallery ==
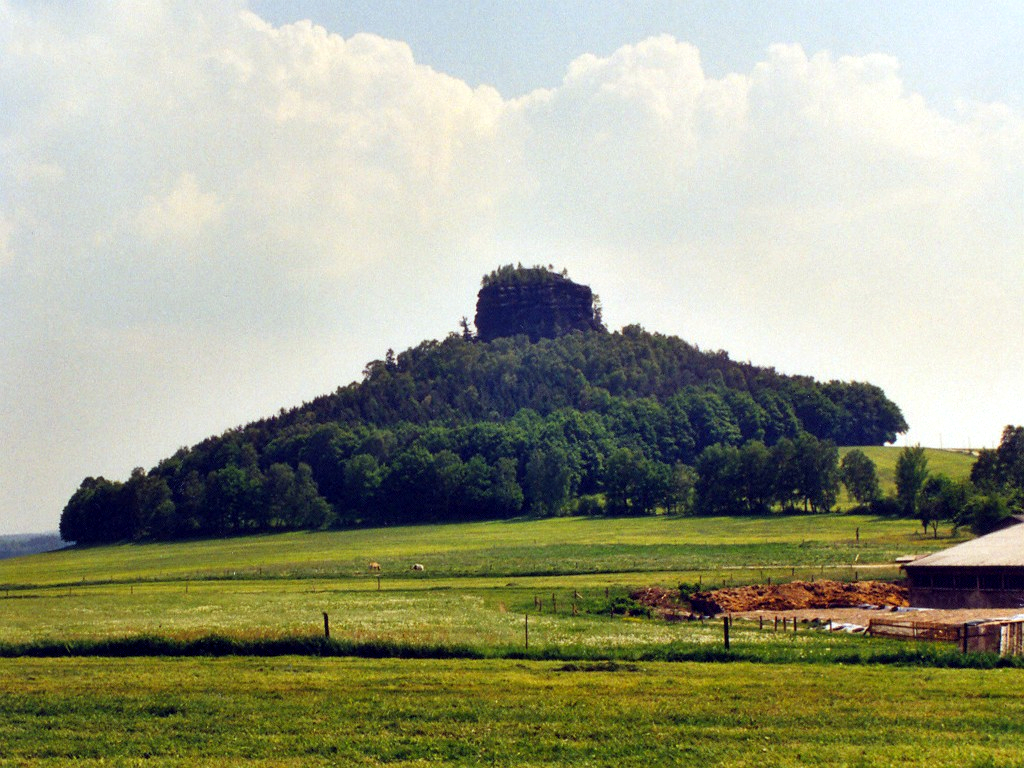
The Zirkelstein

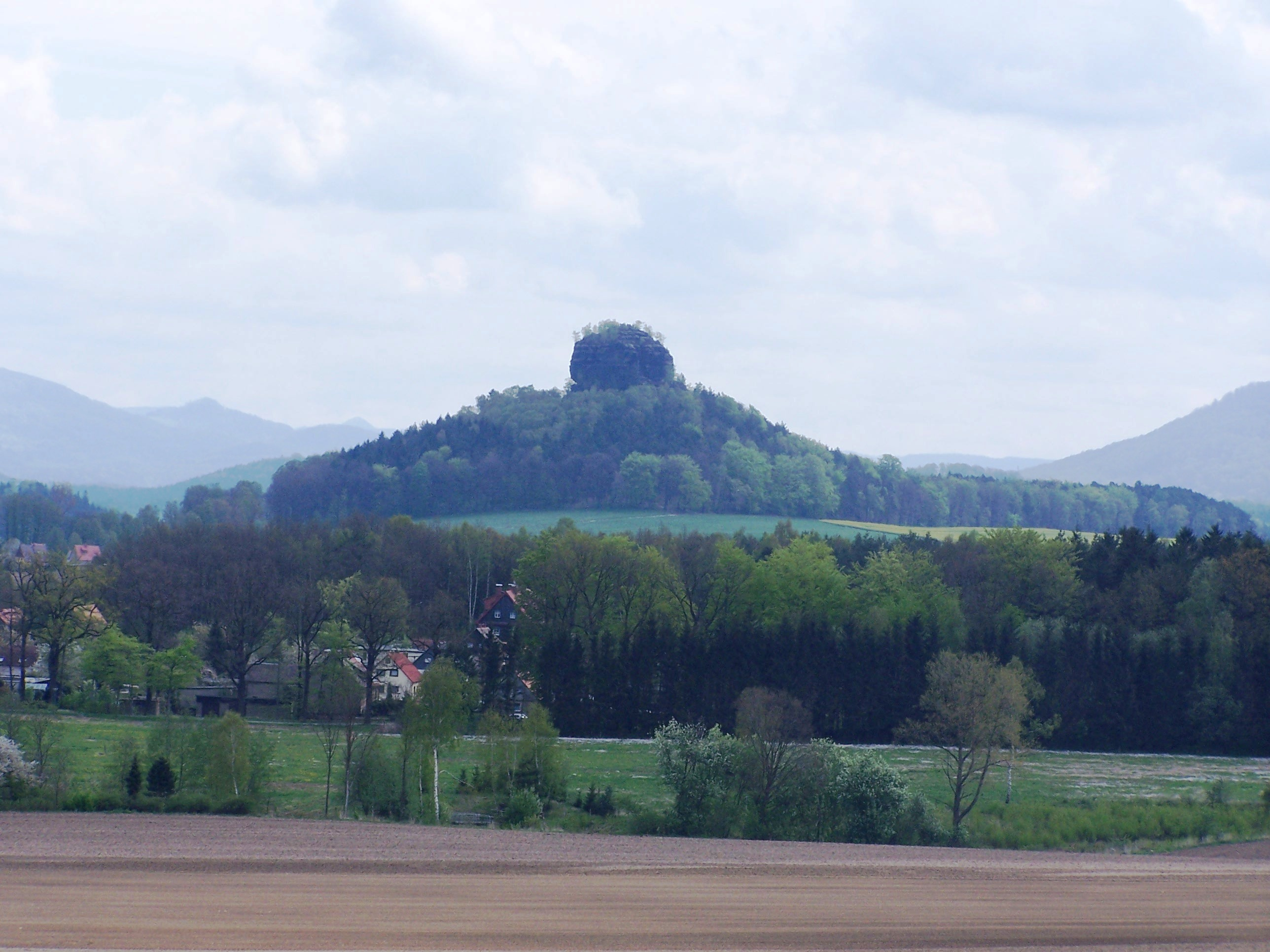
View from Wolfsberg

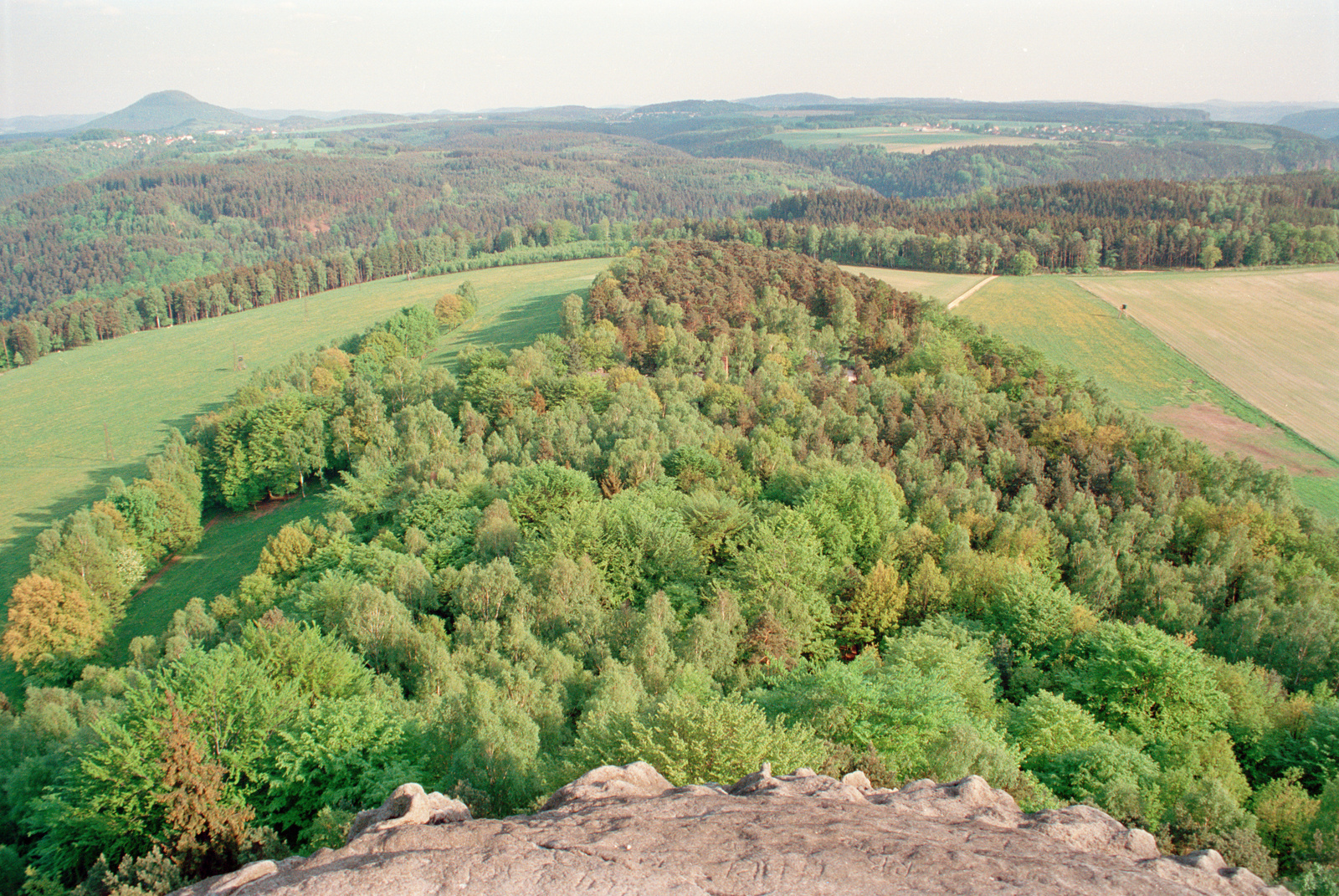
View from the Zirkelstein looking towards the Czech Republic. Left: the Rosenberg

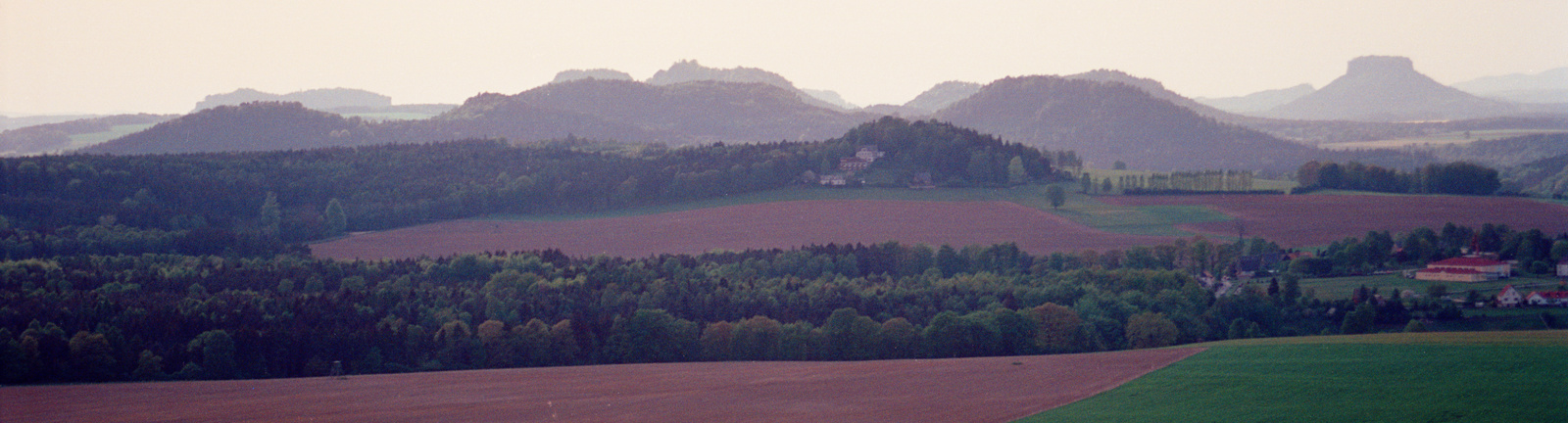
View from the Zirkelstein over the nearly table mountains of Saxon Switzerland
