= Großer Zschirnstein =

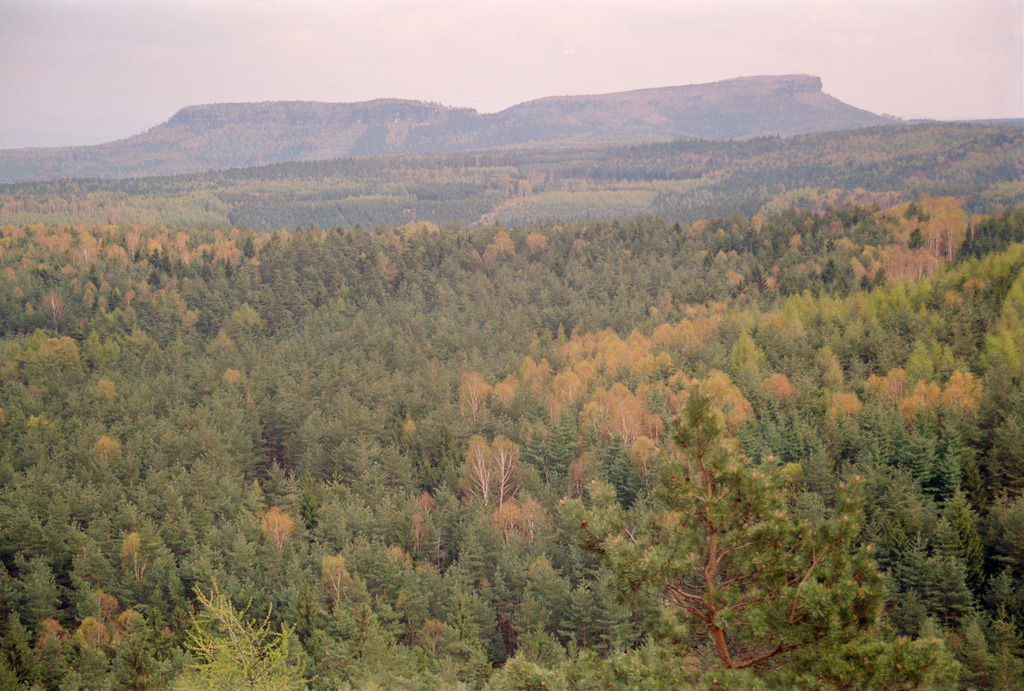
- The Zschirnsteine, left: Kleiner Zschirnstein; right: Großer Zschirnstein

Highest point
- Elevation: 561.74 m above sea level (HN) (1,843.0 ft)
- Listing: Mountains and hills of Saxony
- Coordinates: 50°51′23″N 14°10′34″E

Geography
- Location within Saxony
- Location: Saxony, Germany
- Parent range: Elbe Sandstone Mountains

Geology
- Mountain type: Table mountain
- Rock type: sandstone with basalt extrusion

The Großer Zschirnstein (561.74 m (1,843.0 ft)) is the highest hill in the Saxon and German part of the Elbe Sandstone Mountains.

== Origin of the name ==
The name appears to be derived from the Slavic root word for "black".

== Location and area ==
There are two climbing peaks on the Großer Zschirnstein - the Großer and Kleiner Zschirnsteinturm ("Great" and "Little Zschirnstein Tower"). There is also the Südwand (IV) climbing route that ends directly at the highest point on the hill. This climbing route is one of the three exceptions to Saxon climbing regulations which state that climbing of massifs is generally forbidden.

On the south summit, near the viewing point, a Nagel Column (Nagelsche Säule) has stood since 1865. It recalls August Nagel, the head of survey in Saxony in the 19th century. The survey was carried out using triangulation. Other trig points in the area are located inter alia on the Raumberg, the Lilienstein, the Cottaer Spitzberg and the Hoher Schneeberg. The column on the Großer Zschirnstein was lost around 1900. In May 2011 a replica was erected in its place.

== Geology ==
This typical table hill is made of sandstone. On the summit plateau is a Tertiary basaltic extrusion which was quarried in a small quarry in order to win gravel.

== View ==
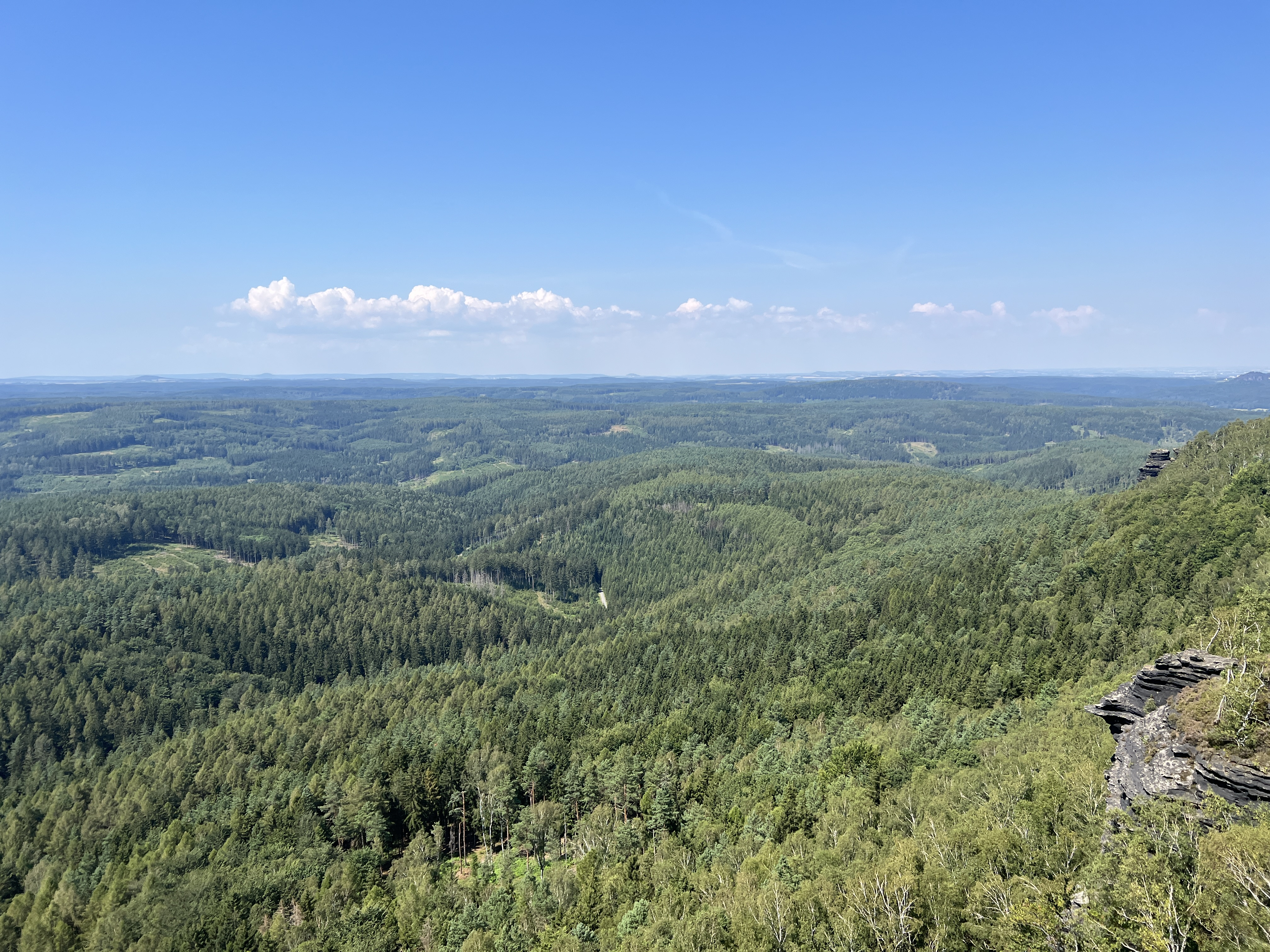
View to the northwest

The following hills, rock formations and settlements can be seen from the Großer Zschirnstein (from northeast through south to northwest): Falkenstein, Schrammsteine, Tanečnice (Tanzplan), Großer Winterberg, Zirkelstein, Kottmar, Prebischtor, Mezní Louka (Rainwiese), Vlčí hora (Wolfsberg), Jedlová (Tannenberg), Pěnkavčí vrch (Finkenkoppe), Studenec (Kaltenberg), Zlatý vrch (Goldberg), Růžovský vrch (Rosenberg), Ještěd (Jeschken), Klíč (Kleis), Bezděz (Bösig), Buková hora (Zinkenstein) (with its prominent TV tower), Lovoš (Lobosch), Kletečna (Kletschen), Milešovka (Milleschauer), Děčínský Sněžník (Hoher Schneeberg), Dresden.

== Air crash ==
On 14 February 2010 around 8.20 pm a Cessna Citation 550 light aircraft crashed into the southern flank of the hill in a craggy area. The aircraft belonged to the Czech airline, Time Air, and was under way from Prague to Karlstad in Sweden. The two pilots were killed. According to an evaluation of the voice recorder the cause of the crash was an aerobatic manoeuvre (aileron roll) for which the aircraft is not authorised.

== See also ==
- List of mountains and hills of the Elbe Sandstone Mountains
