= Wolfsberg (Saxon Switzerland) =

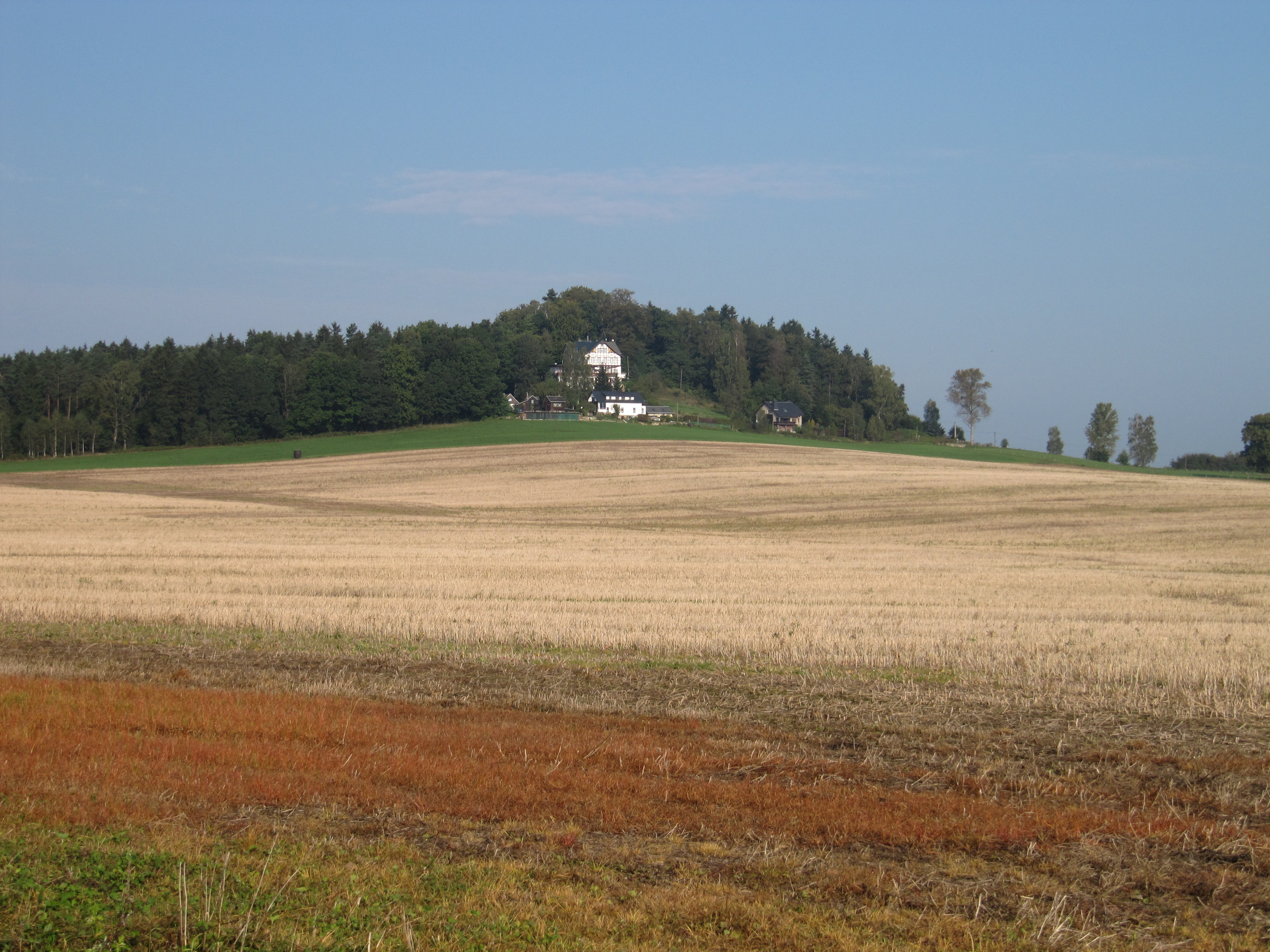
- The Wolfsberg seen from the forest edge north of Reinhardtsdorf.

Highest point
- Elevation: 342.9 m above sea level (HN) (1,125 ft)
- Coordinates: 50°53′15″N 14°10′59″E

Geography
- Location within Saxony
- Location: Saxony (Germany)
- Parent range: Saxon Switzerland

Geology
- Mountain type: Sandstone

The Wolfsberg (German pronunciation: [ˈvɔlfsˌbɛʁk]) is a 342.9 m high hill in Saxon Switzerland in the German Free State of Saxony.

== Location ==
The hill lies south of Reinhardtsdorf in the Elbe Sandstone Mountains. The actual summit is just behind the Panoramahotel Wolfsberg, but is on private land and not readily accessible. Just below the hotel an important hiking trail, the Artists' Way (Malerweg), intersects with the trail to Saxon Switzerland's highest hill, the Großer Zschirnstein. An information board describes the life of Caspar David Friedrich who is famous for his landscapes of Saxon Switzerland.

== History ==
An inn was built a little way below the summit in 1890 which became a popular destination as a result of its good views. The inn has now become a "panorama hotel".

== Ascent of the summit ==
- The hill may be ascended from the railway halt of Schmilka in the Elbe valley along a red-signed hiking trail that runs past the Kaiserkrone, through Schöna and Neue Sorge to the Wolfsberg. It is possible to continue along the path through the forest to the Großer Zschirnstein.
