= Tableland =

Raised landform with a flat top

A tableland is an area containing elevated landforms characterized by a distinct, flat, nearly level, or gently undulating surface. They often exhibit steep, cliff-like edges, known as escarpments, that separate them from surrounding lowlands. Depending on either their size, other physical characteristics, or geographic location, the landforms comprising a tableland are individually referred to by a number of names including butte, mesa, plateau, potrero, tepui, or tuya. A homologous landform under the sea is called either a tablemount or guyot.

== Sedimentary tablelands ==
Sedimentary tablelands are tablelands that typically have developed from the erosion of coarse-grained, clastic, sedimentary rocks in the form of relatively flat-lying sandstones and conglomerates that have not been strongly deformed by tectonics. The primary control on the geomorphology of sedimentary tablelands is the dip of the layers of the sandstones, conglomerates, and associated sedimentary strata. Sedimentary tablelands only form if the dip of the sedimentary layers is negligible. If the sedimentary layers are tilted, although otherwise little deformed, asymmetric ridges known as cuestas develop.

A really extensive sedimentary tablelands are often known as plateaus. As plateaus are dissected by the headward erosion and incision of river and stream courses and the retreat of their bounding escarpments, plateaus are fragmented into tablelands of smaller and smaller extent known as mesas, buttes, or pinnacles. Further erosion eventually reduces these landforms to piles of bouldery rubble as known as rock labyrinths. The tepui of South America are a type of sedimentary tableland composed of erosional outliers of flat-lying Precambrian quartz arenite sandstone that tower over the surrounding jungle underlain by crystalline basement rocks.

== Other tablelands ==
Flat-lying, coarse-grained, clastic sedimentary rocks are not the only layered rocks that serve as the caprock that forms the surface of tablelands. Flat-lying duricrusts and volcanic rocks also form the caprock of various tablelands. In case of duricrusts, e.g. laterite or silcrete, the formation of tablelands involves a three-stage process. First, the formation of a thick indurated surface layer duricrust by deep weathering beneath a relatively flat surface. Second, the breaching and incision of the duricrust layer by rivers or streams. Finally, the inward migration of valley walls and escarpments by slope erosion and denudation of mesas and buttes. An example of such tablelands is the laterite-capped Panchgani Tableland of India. Tablelands formed by the erosion of duricrusts are also quite common in parts of Australia and South America. In addition, the eruption of either lava or pyroclastic flows can deposit a solid surface layer of volcanic rock that is relatively flat. As in case of the duricrusts, the resulting lava or pyroclastic flows are sufficiently tough to form the flat-lying caprock of tablelands when breached and incised by rivers and streams.

== See also ==
- Paleosurface
- Strandflat
