= History of rock climbing =

Bouldering, single pitch and multi-pitch / big wall

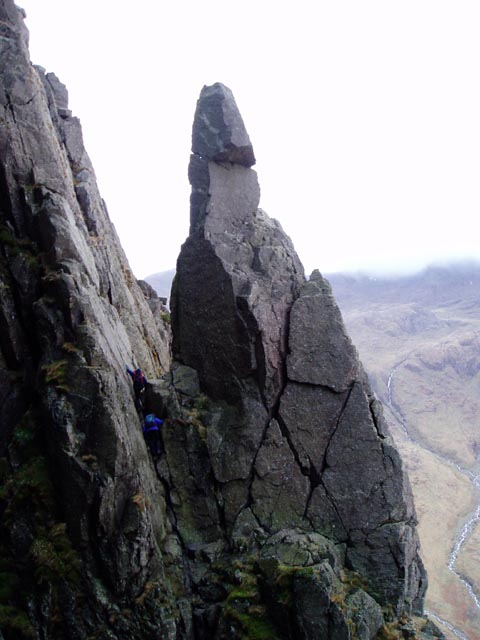
Napes Needle, on the Great Gable in the Lake District, England, was first climbed by W. P. Haskett Smith in June 1886; an act widely considered to be the start of the sport of rock climbing.

In the history of rock climbing, (Note: Rock climbing does not include general mountaineering or ice climbing-related disciplines such as alpine climbing (although it does include Alpine big wall climbing), or mixed climbing) the three main sub-disciplines – bouldering, single-pitch climbing, and big wall (and multi-pitch) climbing – can trace their origins to late 19th-century Europe. Bouldering started in Fontainebleau, and was advanced by Pierre Allain in the 1930s, and John Gill in the 1950s. Big wall climbing, mostly free climbing but with some sections of aid pitons, started in the Dolomites, and was spread across the Alps in the 1930s by climbers such as Emilio Comici and Riccardo Cassin, and in the 1950s by Walter Bonatti, before reaching Yosemite where it was led in the 1950s to 1970s by climbers such as Royal Robbins. Single-pitch climbing started pre-1900 in both the Lake District and in Saxony, and by the late-1970s had spread widely with climbers such as Ron Fawcett (Britain), Bernd Arnold (Germany), Patrick Berhault (France), Ron Kauk and John Bachar (USA).

As a free solo exercise with no artificial aid or climbing protection, bouldering remained largely consistent since its origins. Lead climbing on single-pitch climbing routes stopped using artificial aid in the early 20th-century, led by Paul Preuss and the "free climbing" movement. Free climbing of 'big walls' started before World War I, and was advanced by Emil Solleder in the 20s, Batista Vinatzer in the 30s, and Mathias Rebitsch in the late-40s. Climbing protection was needed for single-pitch and big-wall free climbing, and it was inserted into the rock by the lead climber and then removed by the following climber; this is now called "traditional climbing". By the 1980s, French pioneers like Patrick Edlinger wanted to climb rock faces in Buoux and Verdon that had few cracks in which to insert traditional-climbing protection. Controversially, they pre-placed—by abseiling from above—using battery-powered drills, strong permanent bolts for protection (but not as artificial aid) on new free climbs; this became known as "sport climbing". This extremely safe form of lead climbing, along with a softening of free climbing ethics (e.g. bolts, projecting, chalk, hangdogging, and pinkpointing) enabled a dramatic increase in climbing standards, grades, and tools (e.g. artificial climbing walls and campus boards), the development of competition climbing (initially dominated in the 1990s by French climbers such as François Legrand), and the "professional" rock climber.

By the end of the 20th century, the hardest sport-climbs were often combinations of bouldering-moves, and some of the best challenges lay in free climbing extreme big walls; this led to greater cross-over amongst the three sub-disciplines. Leading climbers such as Wolfgang Güllich, Jerry Moffatt, Alexander Huber, Fred Nicole, Chris Sharma, Adam Ondra, and Tommy Caldwell set records in several of these disciplines. Huber and Allain Robert also made ever-bolder single-pitch free solo climbs, while Sharma pushed standards in deep-water soloing; Alex Honnold's big wall free soloing was turned into the Oscar-winning film, Free Solo. In 2016, the IOC announced that competition climbing would be a medal sport in the 2020 Summer Olympics.

Female rock climbing also began in the late 19th-century, but women were initially a tiny percetage of climbers. By the mid-1970s female climbers became much more common and they began leading some of the hardest routes; all-female teams were not unusual. By the 1980s, climbers such as Lynn Hill and Catherine Destivelle were closing the gap to the standard of routes being climbed by the leading men. By the 21st-century, Josune Bereziartu, Angela Eiter and Ashima Shiraishi, had closed the gap to the highest sport and boulder climbing grades achieved by men to within one/two notches; Beth Rodden fully closed the gap for traditional climbing grades in 2008 and Janja Garnbret became the most successful competition climber in history with 50 IFSC world cup golds.Today women make up about 30% of rock climbers.

== Origins ==
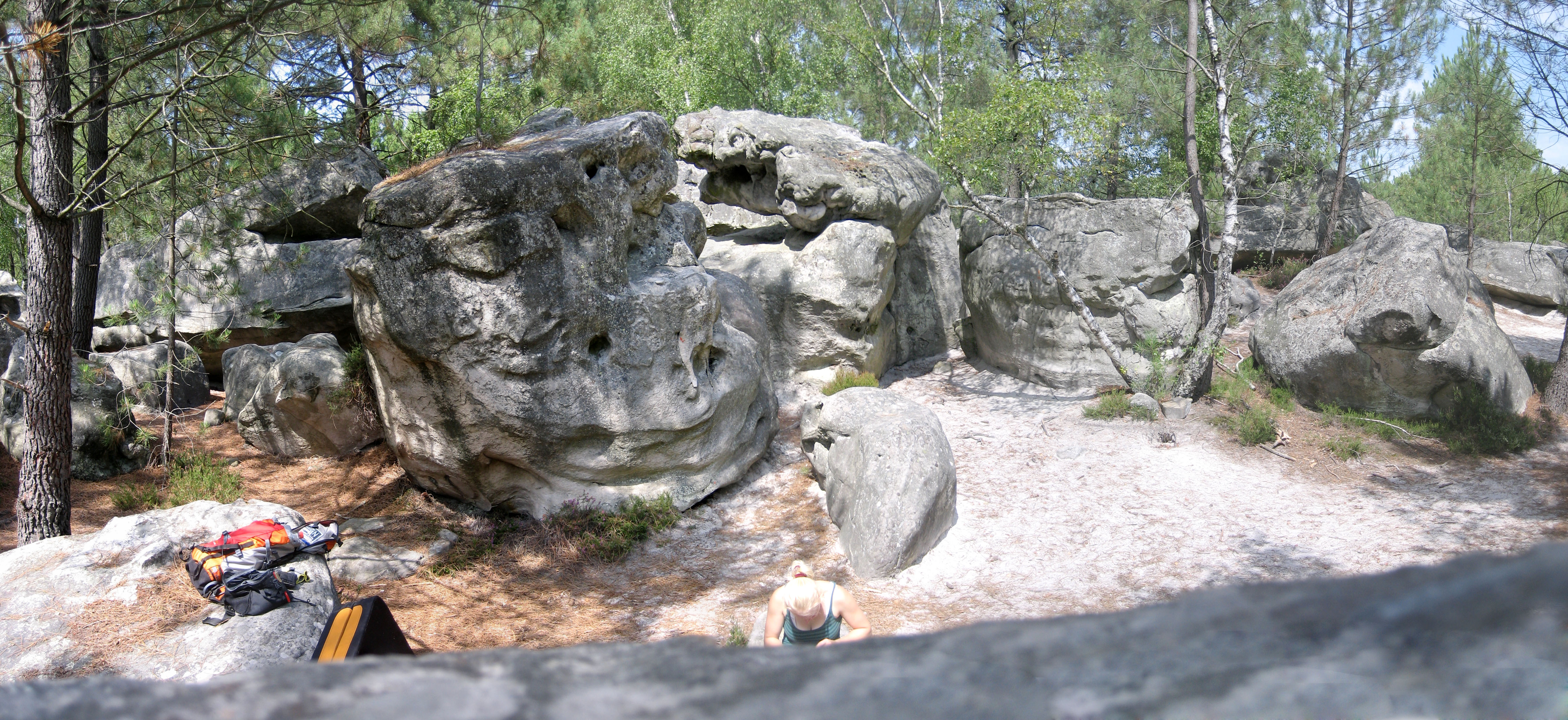
The forest of Fontainebleau outside Paris, was the birthplace of bouldering at the turn of the 20th-century.

There are early documented examples of people "rock climbing" to achieve various objectives. The Le Quart Livre records that in 1492, ordered by his king, Antoine de Ville used castle siege tactics to ascend Mont Aiguille, a 300-meter rock tower, near Grenoble, France. In 1695, Martin Martin described the traditional practice of fowling by climbing with the use of ropes in the Hebrides of Scotland, especially on St Kilda.

The first ascent of Mont Blanc in 1786, started mountaineering's "modern era"; however it would take another century until the fixed anchors of rock climbing appeared, including pitons, bolts, and rappel slings. By the early 19th-century, "alpine rock climbing" was developing as a pastime; the tools of the alpine shepherd guides (early mountain guides), the alpenstock and woodcutter's axe (later combined as the ice axe).

Although the action of rock climbing had become a component of 19th-century victorian era Alpine mountaineering, a sport of rock climbing (i.e. climbing short rock routes as a recreational activity without any summit objective), originated in the last quarter of the 19th century, and in four European locations: the Saxon Switzerland climbing region in Germany, the Lake District and Peak District in England, the Dolomites in Italy, and in the forest of Fontainebleau in France.

- The solo first ascent of Napes Needle in the Lake District, England, by Walter Parry Haskett Smith in June 1886 is widely considered to be the start of the sport of rock climbing in the UK. In 1897, O. G. Jones climbed Kern Knotts Crack at grade VS. By the early 20th-century, groups of 60 would gather at the Wastwater Hotel in the Lake District during vacations.
- The birth of climbing in Saxon Switzerland for nothing but sporting motivation is credited to gymnasts from nearby Bad Schandau who used ladders and other aid equipment to ascend the Falkenstein in 1864. Ten years later in 1874, O. E. Ufer and H. Frick free climbed the rock pinnacle "Mönch" with a similar motivation, consciously avoiding the use of aid equipment. Inspired by late 19th-century pioneers such as Oscar Schuster on Falkenstein, by 1903 there were 500 climbers in the Saxon Switzerland climbing region, including the well-known team of Rudolf Fehrmann and American Oliver Perry-Smith; their 1906 ascent of Teufelsturm at grade VIIb, set new standards of difficulty. By the 1930s, there were 200 climbing clubs in the area.
- The 1887 solo first ascent of the Vajolet Towers by the 17-year-old Munich high school student Georg Winkler, encouraged the acceptance and development of the sport in the Dolomites, and in particular opened up the era of big wall climbing on the huge rock faces of the Dolomites, which spread over the wider Alps including the important centre of Chamonix in France.
- By 1897, members of the French Club alpin français began to gather amongst the boulders of Fontainebleau to practice their rock climbing skills that they would use in the Alpine season; the boulders were shorter than the large walls being attempted in the Lake District, Saxon Switzerland or the Dolomites, but this led to the development of more advanced bouldering skills.

== 19th century ==
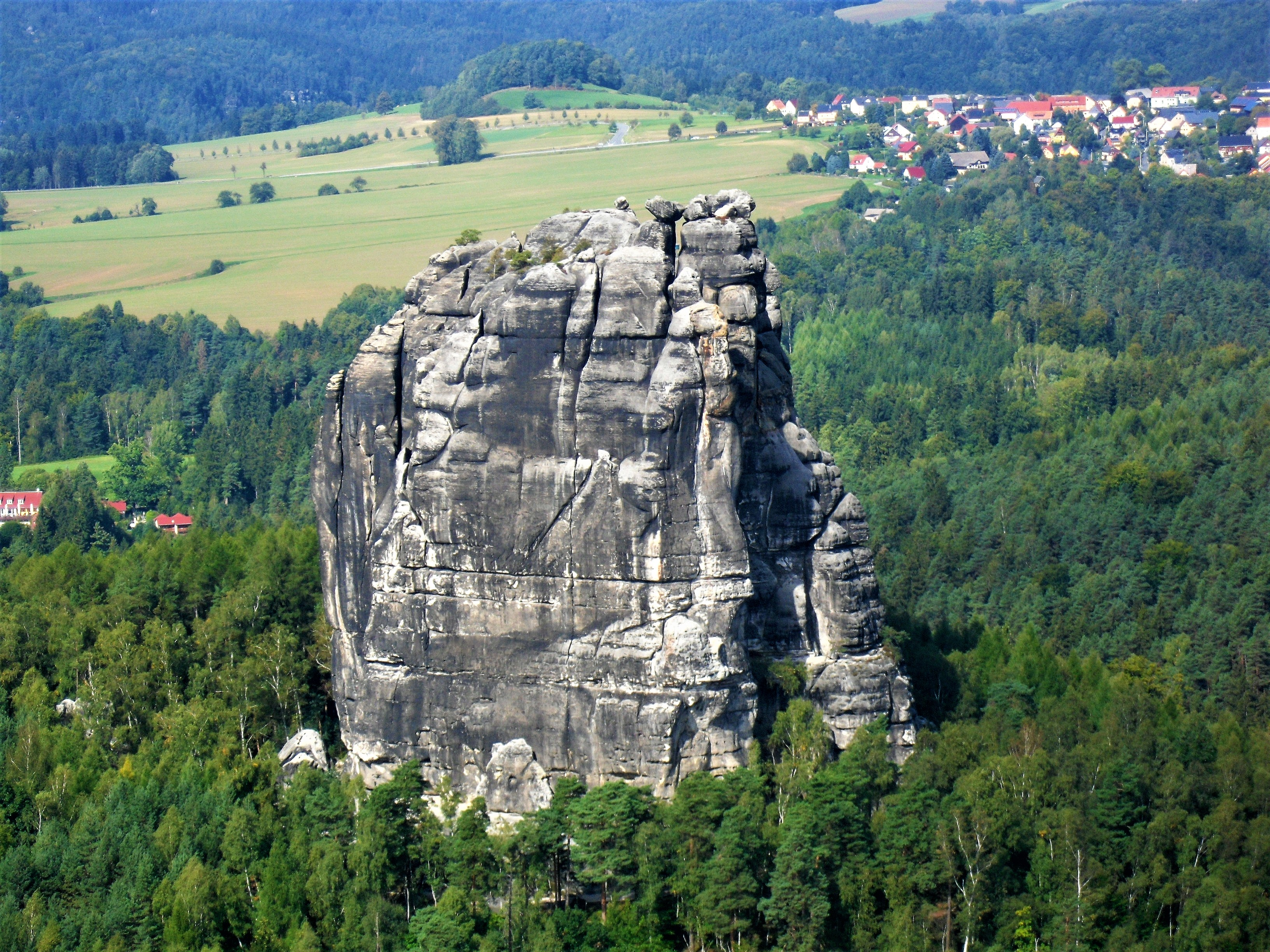
Falkenstein, in Saxon Switzerland where routes above grade 6a (5.10a) were first climbed in 1906.

- 1826: Pillar Rock (Mod), first climbed on the 9th July by John Atkinson, a farmer’s son from Croftfoot, Ennerdale.
- 1848: Sebastian Abratzky, a local chimney sweep, enters the hill-top Königstein Fortress by climbing a chimney to avoid the entrance fee; this is now considered the first free climb in the Saxon Switzerland climbing region, and is today a route called Abratzkykamin Sax IV (5.4).
- 1857: John Ball, future Alpine Club president, does a first ascent of Monte Pelmo in the Dolomites.
- 1859–1869: Paul Grohmann makes numerous first ascents of various rocky spires in the Dolomites, including Tofana di Mezzo, Sorapiss, Cristallo and Langkofel.
- 1864: Gustav Tröger, Ernst Fischer, J. Wähnert and H. Frenzel aid climb Turnerweg on Falkenstein, formally starting the sport of rock climbing in Saxon Switzerland.
- 1869 : John Muir free solos, and onsight, Cathedral Peak in Tuolumne Meadows, Yosemite.
- 1874: Otto Ewald Ufer and H. Frick do the FFA of Mönch, in the Saxon Switzerland climbing region.
- 1875 : George Anderson does the first ascent of Half Dome in Yosemite, using drilled eye bolts for aid and a fixed rope to return to his high point each day.
- 1876: Donald McDonald, a crofter from Lewis, climbs Handa—first recorded leisure climb in U.K.
- 1876: Jean Charlet-Straton invents the basic body rappel in the French Alps; the more popular dülfersitz is introduced 1910 by Hans Dülfer.
- 1881: Mountain guide Benedikt Venetz leads Albert Mummery and Alex Burgener on the first ascent of the Aiguille du Grépon (10-pitches), in Chamonix; the crux is the famous 40-foot Fissure Mummery ("Mummery Crack") at 5.6 (4c) is maybe first-ever grade HS 4b.
- 1881: Michael Innerkofler and Hans Innerkofler ascend the Cima Piccola of the Tre Cime di Lavaredo, Sexten Dolomites, at 5.5 (4b).
- 1886 : June, W. P. Haskett Smith free solos the 70-foot Napes Needle (V Diff), in the Lake District—considered the "birth" of the sport in the UK.
- 1887 : Georg Winkler, aged 17, free solos the Vajolet Towers (5.5, 7-pitches) in hemp-soled sailor's boots, initiating the sport in the Dolomites.
- 1892: Steel carabiners appear in the Saxon Switzerland climbing region—they can hold static body weight but are not reliable for dynamic falls.
- 1893: Lily Bristow is the first-ever female to summit the difficult Aiguille du Grepon, in Chamonix, France.
- 1893 : June, Devils Tower in Wyoming US is aid climbed using wooden poles by ranchers William Rogers and Willard Ripley.
- 1897: O. G. Jones does the FFA, after top rope, of Kern Knotts Crack, Great Gable in England; at VS 4c is potentially the first-ever 5.7 (5a).

== 1900s ==
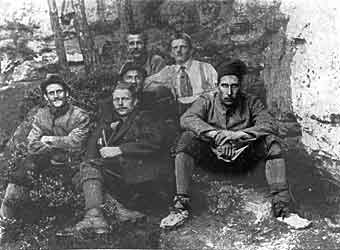
Oliver Perry-Smith (right) freed the first 6a (5.10a) with Perrykante in 1906 in the Saxon Switzerland; a region where the world's first 6a/a+ (Südriss, 1910), 6a+ (Westkante, 1918), 6a+/b (Kuniskante, 1921), 6b (Rostkante, 1922), and 6b+ (Talseite, 1952) would also be freed.

- 1900: (approximately) : Oscar Eckenstein demonstrates the concept of modern balance climbing on his eponymous bouldering route in Llanberis Pass, Wales.
- 1900 : Tita Piaz free solos onsight Piaz Route (7-pitches), Punta Emma, Catinaccio, Italy, at 5a (5.7).
- 1900 : Heinrich Pfannl, Thomas Maischberger, and Franz Zimmer do the first alpine first free ascent on the Southwest Face of Dent du Géant, in Chamonix, avoiding all spikes, ropes, and ladders.
- 1901 : Michele Bettaga, Beatrice Tomasson, Artolo Zagonel make the first ascent of the South Face of Marmolada, Dolomites, Italy in a day; first big-wall climb (5.5, using 4 pitons for anchors on 24-pitches).
- 1906 : Oliver Perry-Smith, W. Hünig, Rudolf Fehrmann climb Perrykante on Teufelsturm, in Saxon Switzerland; 90-feet, Sax VIIb with a shoulder stand; world's first-ever grade 5b (5.8) route.
- 1908 : Tita Piaz, J. Klammer, R. Schietzold, F Schroffenegger, do the first ascent of the West Face of Totenkirchl (19-pitches), Austria, UIAA Grade V (5.7 with a tension traverse).
- 1909 : (approximately) Specialist felt-soled climbing shoes are introduced for rock climbing.

== 1910s ==
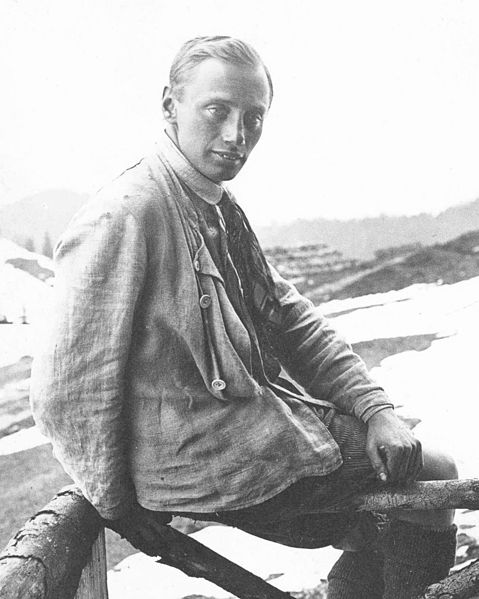
Free soloing pioneer Paul Preuss' advocacy of free climbing over aid climbing changed the sport forever.
- 1910 : Hans Fiechtl replaces the attached ring on pitons to the modern eye in the body.
- 1910 : Max Matthäus, Oliver Perry-Smith, and H. Wagner do the FFA of Großer Falknerturm in Saxon Switzerland, Sax VIIb, first-ever 5c (5.9).
- 1910 : Max Matthäus does the FFA of Südriss in Saxon Switzerland, Sax VIIc, first-ever 6a/a+ 5.10a/b .
- 1910 : Angelo Dibona, G. Mayer, M. Mayer, A. Dimai, and L. Rizzi climb the 2,500-foot North Face of Cima Una, in the Dolomites, UIAA V+ (5.8).
- 1910 : Franz Schroffenegger and Franz Wenter climb the 450-metre Northwest Face of Delago Tower, and the 500-metre North Face of Croda di Re Laurino, in the Dolomites. UIAA Grade VI− (5.9−).
- 1911 : Paul Preuss free solos the FFA of the East Face of Campanile Basso, Dolomites, big wall free solo at 5.7 (5a).
- 1911 : September, Paul Preuss, starts the famous Mauerhakenstreit (or piton dispute), advocating for free climbing; writing in the German Alpine Journal he defines "artificial aid" and lists 6 rules of free climbing including the important rule 4: "The piton is an emergency aid and not the basis of a system of mountaineering". (Note: The two principal uses of pitons on an ascent are as protective safeguards (not used for actual hand or footholds - climbers refrained from putting weight on them except in the event of a fall) and as direct aid (used to physically assist in ascending a steep or overhanging slope rather than merely as protection). Climbers like Paul Preuss and Geoffrey Winthrop Young argued strongly against direct aid, but others of that era, including Hans Dülfer and Tita Piaz, advocated using such devices as artificial aids in order to climb otherwise unscalable walls. After World War I most European climbers chose to employ artificial aid when necessary. However, from the beginning days of rock climbing as a sport, through the 1940s, another form of artificial assistance was at times employed by teams of two or more climbers: the shoulder stand. From our current perspective, it seems odd that many of those climbers who strenuously objected to hanging on a piton found the shoulder stand to be quite acceptable. Occasionally, historical climbing photos, (e.g., ) illustrate this strategy, which arose from the perception that ascending a route was a team effort, with two climbers constituting one natural climbing unit. Something to keep in mind when reading of very early climbs in the 5.8 to 5.10 range.)
- 1912 : Angelo Dibona, Luigi Rizzi, and Guido and Max Mayer, climb the South Face of the Meije, Massif des Écrins.
- 1913 : Hans Dülfer free solos, onsight, the 250-metre Dülferriss (6-pitches) on the Fleischbank, in Austria, at UIAA VI− (5.9−).
- 1913 : Hans Dülfer and Willi von Redwitz, climb the 700-metre West Face Direct (23-pitches), on Totenkirchl, in Austria, at UIAA V+ with two rope traverses at 5.8 (5b) X, is the world's longest rock climb to date.
- 1913 : Hans Dülfer, with only 3 pitons, leads the West Face (8-pitches) of the Cima Grande, in the Dolomites, at 5.8 (5b) X; he invents a 5-step grading system, the rope tension traverse technique, and the dülfersitz rappelling technique.
- 1913 : Rudolf Fehrmann publishes the second edition of Der Bergsteiger in der Sächsischen Schweiz with the first binding rules for climbing in the Saxon Switzerland to protect the soft sandstone rock; these rules for free climbing are still in use today.
- 1916 : Ivar Berg free solos the 60-foot Cave Arête Indirect at Laddow Rocks, Derbyshire, England, at E1 5a 5.9 (5c), it was the first E1.
- 1918 : Emanuel Strubich does the FFA of Westkante (2-pitches) at the Wilder Kopf, Saxon Switzerland, Sax VIIIa, first-ever 6a+ (5.10b).

== 1920s ==
- 1921 : Oswald Kunis does the FFA of Kuniskante on Rauschentorwächter, in the Saxon Switzerland Sax VIIIa/VIIIb, the first-ever 6a+/b 5.10b/c .
- 1921 :Otto Herzog and Gustav Haber climb the 1,000-foot Ha-He Dihedral on Dreizinkenspitze in Austria, at UIAA VI+ (5.9+).
- 1922 : Hans Rost does the FFA of Rostkante, on Hauptwiesenstein, in the Saxon Switzerland Sax VIIIb, the first-ever 6b (5.10c).
- 1922 : Paul Illmer does the FFA of Illmerweg on Falkenstein, Sax VIIc or 5.10a (6a), in the Saxon Switzerland; famous "mailbox" roof.
- 1923 : Willo Welzenbach, creates the Roman Numeral European rating system (Grades I to VI); becomes the UIAA grading system.
- 1924 : Felix Simon and Roland Rossi climb the 850-metre North Face of Monte Pelmo, in the Dolomites, Italy, at UIAA V+, placing 11 pitons.
- 1925 : July 28, Fritz Wiessner, Roland Rossi do the FA of the Southeast Face (11-pitches) of Fleischbank, Austria, at VI+/5.10a.
- 1925 : August 1, Emil Solleder and Fritz Wiessner climb the North Face (20-pitches) of Furchetta, Dolomites, at UIAA VI (5.9) near the top.
- 1925 : August 7, Gustav Lettenbauer and Emil Solleder ascend the NW Face (44-pitches) of Civetta, Dolomites, at UIAA VI− 5.9.
- 1927 : Laurent Grivel designs and sells the first rock drill and the climbing expansion bolt.
- 1927 : Fred Pigott slings natural chockstones—later machine nuts—for protection at Clogwyn Du'r Arddu, leading to the climbing nut.
- 1929 : Luigi Micheluzzi, Demitrio Christomannos and Roberto Perathoner do the first ascent of South Pillar of Marmolada, Dolomites at 5.9+.
- 1929 : Miriam Underhill and Alice Damesme make the first "manless" ascent of the Aiguille du Grépon, in Chamonix, France.

== 1930s ==
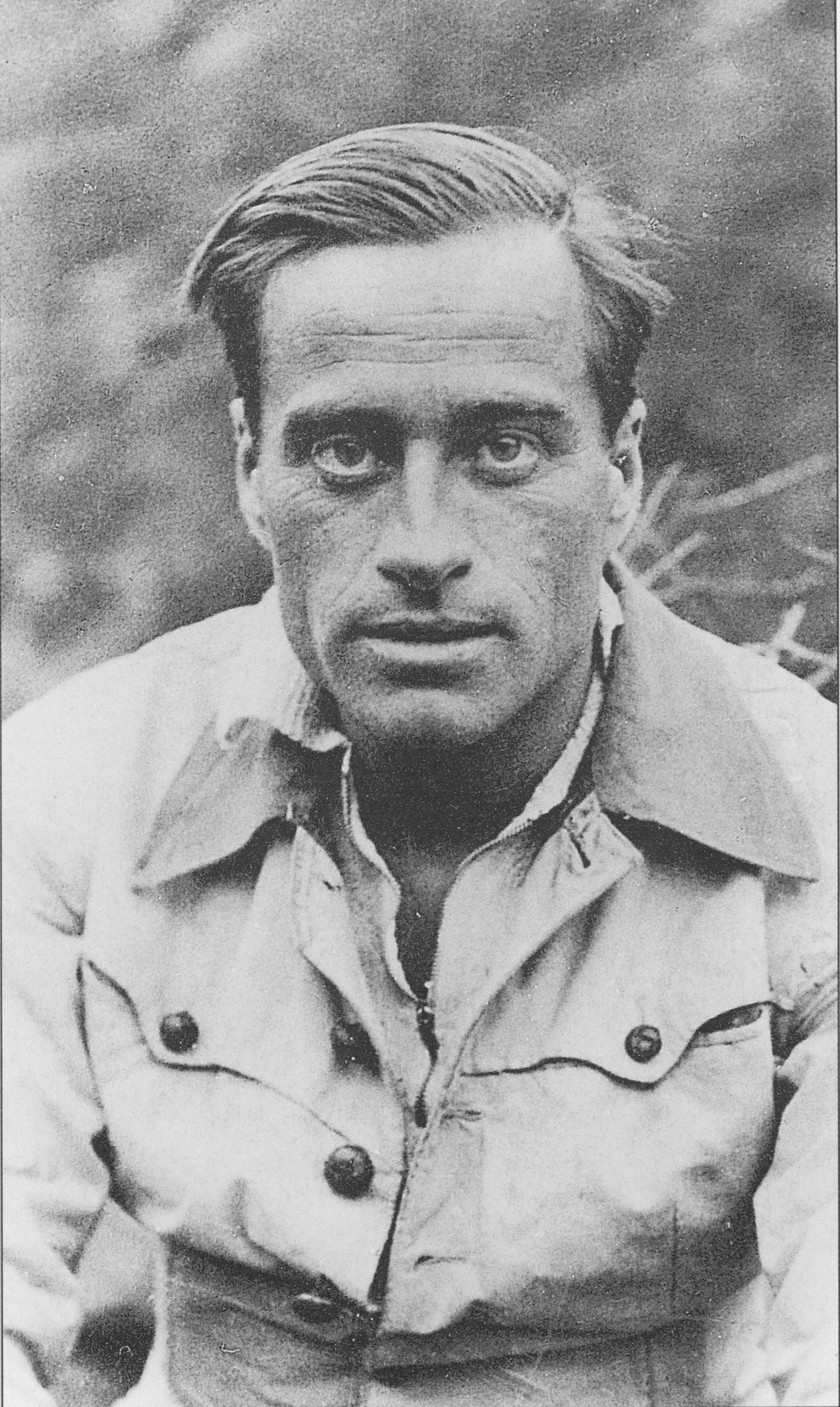
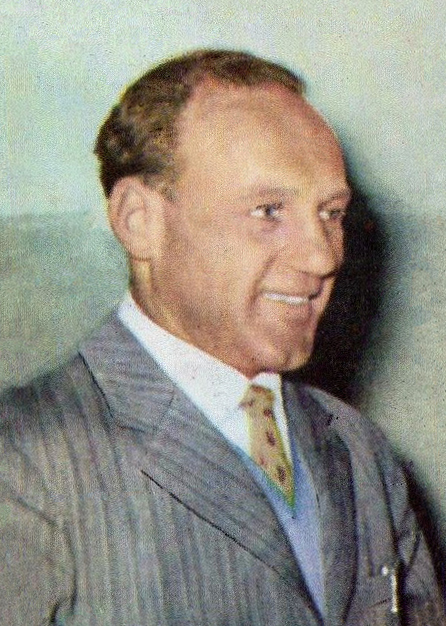
In the 1930s, Emilio Comici (left) and Riccardo Cassin (right, once taught by Comici) pioneered big wall climbing tools and techniques, and set new "hardest-ever" routes in the Alps.
- 1931 : Emilio Comici invents the aid ladder, solid belay anchor, taglining, and hanging bivouacs; tools that changed big wall climbing. He used them on his 3-day ascent of 1500-metre Northwest Face (57-pitches) of the Civetta, Dolomites, mostly free (5.9+ with 3 aid sections, only 35 pitons).
- 1932 : Batista Vinatzer and Giuani Rifesser climb Furchetta North Face route, Dolomites, adding a dangerous, 5-pitch direct finish, UIAA VII− (5.10b/c X), only 5 new protection pitons.
- 1933 : Emilio Comici, Giuseppi Dimai and Angelo Dimai climb, in 3 days, the 1,700-foot North Face Dimai Route of Cima Grande, in the Dolomites, at 5.9 and 3 aid pitches; becomes the world's most overhanging big wall climbing route.
- 1933 : Batista Vinatzer and Vincenzo Peristi climb the North Face of Monte Stevia, in the Dolomites, UIAA VII− (5.10c) (6-pitches).
- 1934 : Pierre Allain champions bouldering at Fontainebleau; climbs L'Angle Allain, 5C .
- 1934 : Raffaele Carlesso, Bartolo Sandri climb, in 2 days, the 750-metre South Face of Torre Trieste, Dolomites at UIAA VI+; one pitch is potentially the first-ever 6c+ (5.11b/c).
- 1935 : Riccardo Cassin, Vittorio Ratti climb the 700-metre North Face of Cima Ovest, in the Dolomites, takes 3 days and 60 pitons, 5.9 and 3 aid sections. Most committing big wall climbing to date.
- 1935 : Pierre Allain, adds a protective rubber rand to the side of a tennis shoe to create a climbing shoe; later, in 1947, with Edmond Bourdonneau (EB), he markets a stiffer, flat-soled edging shoe, the "PA".
- 1936 : Batista Vinatzer and Ettore Castiglioni do the FFA of a new 29-pitch route on the Marmolada, Dolomites, UIAA VII− (5.10c), hardest big wall long free climb in the world.
- 1937 : Emilio Comici re-climbs, and mostly as free solo, the North Face Dimai Route on the Cima Grande at 5.9 (5c).
- 1938 : Riccardo Cassin, Gino Esposito, Ugo Tizzoni do the first ascent of the 3,500-foot Walker Spur of the Grandes Jorasses at UIAA VI 5.9/5.10a with some aid; it is one of the Great north faces of the Alps described as "...perhaps the finest in existence" by Gaston Rébuffat.

== 1940s ==
- 1940s : World War II leads to the development of inexpensive, army-surplus pitons, carabiners and the newly invented nylon rope.
- 1945 : Chris Preston does the FFA, with no protection, of the two pitches of Suicide Wall, on the Idwal Slabs, Wales, at E2 5c (5.10c X).
- 1946 : Mathias Rebitsch and Sepp Spiegl do the FFA of an 8-pitch route on Fleischbank, Austria, UIAA VII (5.10d).
- 1946 : René Ferlet solves Marie-Rose, in Fontainebleau, France, considered one of the first-ever boulders at 6A (V3).
- 1947 : Pierre Allain, in France, and Raffi Bedayn, in the US, introduce lightweight, aluminum carabiners especially for climbing.
- 1947 : Mathias Rebitsch, and Franz Lorenz lead Nordverschneidung (21-pitches), on Laliderer Spitze, Austria, first big wall route at UIAA VII .
- 1949 : Peter Harding does the FFA of Demon Rib, at Black Rocks, in the UK, first-ever 6c (5.11a/b), or E3 5c.

== 1950s ==
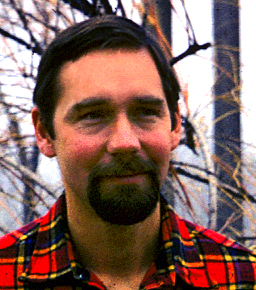
In the 1950s, "Father of Bouldering" John Gill, pioneered modern bouldering and set several new "hardest-ever" grades.
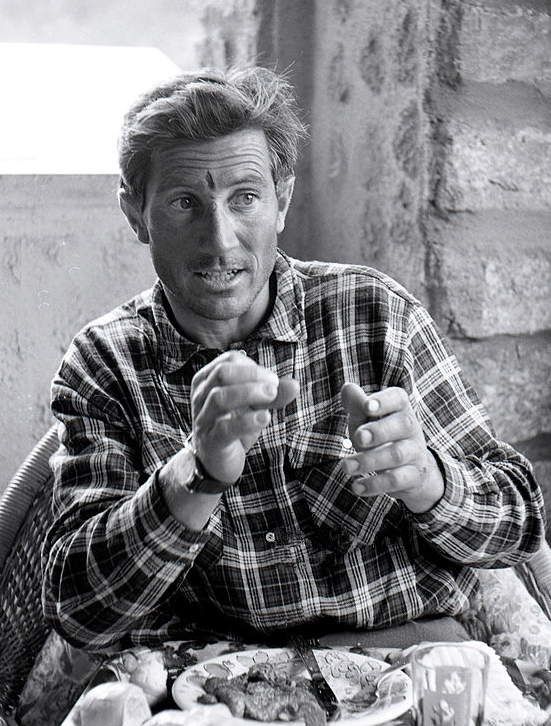
Walter Bonatti's iconic ascent of the Bonatti Pillar on the Dru cemented his status as one of the greatest big wall climbers in history.
- 1951 : Joe Brown, wearing tennis shoes, onsights Right Eliminate, at Curbar Edge, UK, at E3 5c or 6b+ (5.10d/11a).
- 1952 : Lionel Terray, Guido Magnone do the FA of Mount Fitzroy (16-pitches), Patagonia, big wall aid climb at 5.9 (5c).
- 1952 : John Streetly does the FFA, onsight, of Bloody Slab, at Clogwyn Du'r Arddu, in Wales, at E3 5b (5.10a X).
- 1952 : Cesare Maestri free solos the Solleder Route (44-pitches) on Monte Civetta, in the Dolomites, at UIAA VI− (5.9−).
- 1952 : Harry Rost leads, despite using 3 shoulder stands, one of the world's hardest free climbs, Talseite on Schwager, Schrammsteine, in Saxon Switzerland, at Sax VIIIc 6b+ (5.10d/11a), (today all free at IXa).
- 1952 : Hermann Buhl does the FFA, free solo and onsite, of Via Cassin, Piz Badile (21-pitches), on the 8th ascent, UIAA VI+ (5.10a).
- 1952: Guido Magnone, Lucien Bérardini, Adrien Dagory, Marcel Lainé climb the 1,000 metre big wall aid route West Face of Aiguille Dru in 2 pushes over 8 days.
- 1953 : Robert Paragot solves Le Joker, in Fontainebleau, France, first-ever boulder at 7A (V6).
- 1953 : Edelrid invents the "kernmantle rope" with an abrasion-protective sheath making nylon ropes safer.
- 1954 : Joe Brown and Don Whillans climb the West Face of Aiguille de Blaitiere, with the Fissure Brown at 5.10b (6a+).
- 1955 : Walter Bonatti does the first ascent, solo, of the Bonatti Pillar, on the Dru over six days at 5.9 A1, one of the most famous ascents in big wall climbing history.
- 1956: Chuck Wilts publishes A Climber's Guide to Tahquitz Rock, with the now dominant Yosemite Decmial System.
- 1957 : Walter Philipp and Dieter Flamm lead the 3,000-foot Philipp-Flamm on Monte Civetta, Dolomites. Most sustained Alpine free climb at UIAA VI+ (with two very short aid sections).
- 1957 : Royal Robbins, Jerry Gallwas, Mike Sherrick climb the NW Face of Half Dome, Yosemite, in 5 days. 25-pitches, 5.7 A3, 275 pitons and 20 direct aid bolts. Their ascent is considered the birth of modern US big wall climbing.
- 1958: July 9, Allan Austin free solos Western Front at Almscliff, England, first-ever free solo at E3 5c, 6c (5.11a/b).
- 1958 : Herbert "Fliege" Richter does the FFA of Fledermausweg in Saxon Switzerland, at VIIIc or 5.11a (6b+).
- 1958 : John Gill introduces gymnastic "chalk" to bouldering which would become standard rock-climbing equipment.
- 1958 : John Gill solves Gill Right Problem, in the Teton Range, in Wyoming, the first-ever boulder at V8 (7B/7B+);
- 1958 : Warren Harding and team aid climb The Nose, on El Capitan in Yosemite, using siege tactics (600 pitons and 125 bolts) over 45 days at 5.8/A3.
- 1958 : Don Whillans does the FFA onsight of Goliath, at Burbage, in England, one of the first-ever at 6c (5.11a/b).
- 1959 : John Gill solves Red Cross Overhang (or Gill Problem), in the Teton Range, in Wyoming, the first-ever boulder at V9 (7C).

== 1960s ==
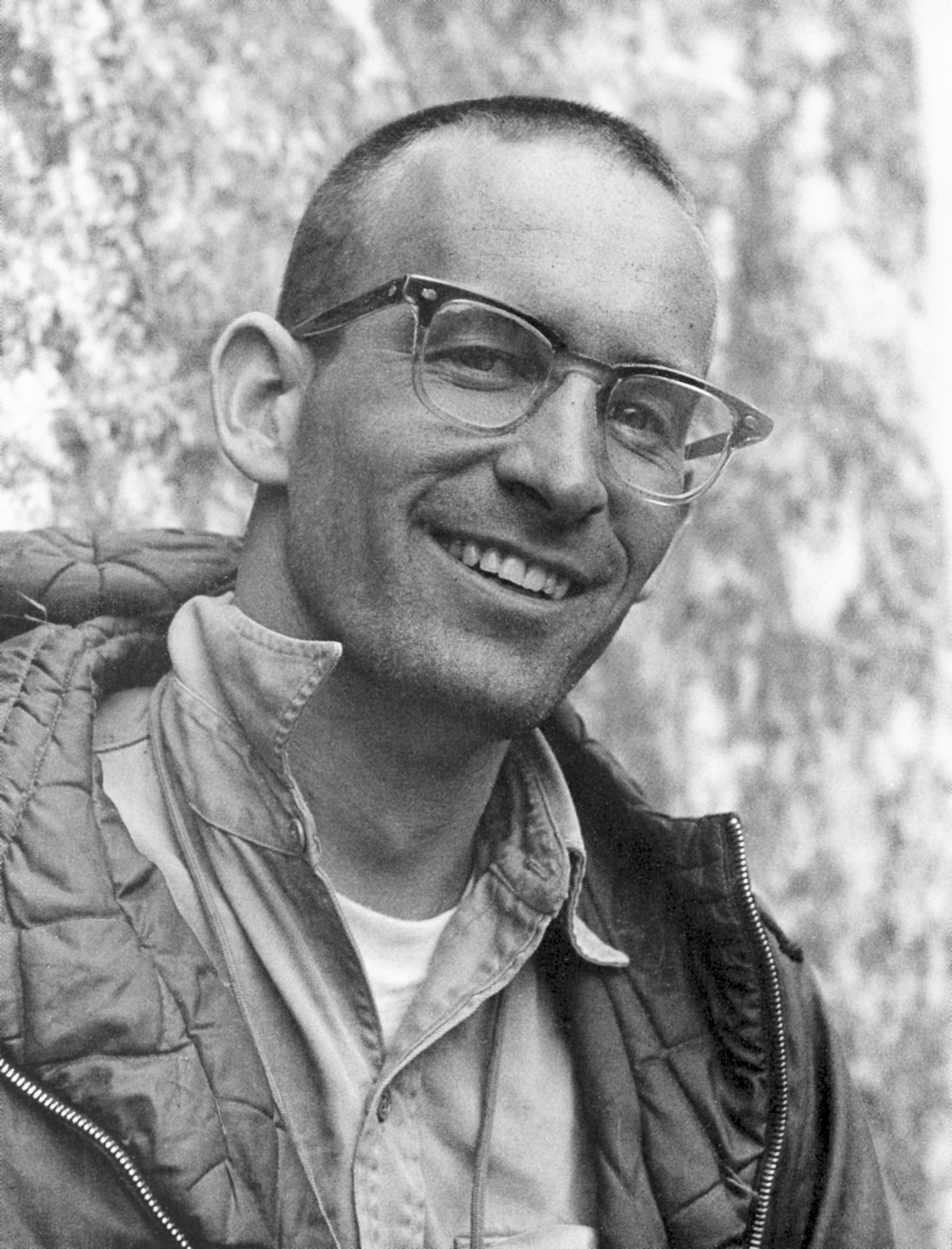
Royal Robbins led Yosemite's big wall "Golden Age" from the late 1950s to the early 1970s, minimizing use of aid, unlike his rival Warren J. Harding.
- 1961: June, Allan Austin free solos the FFA of Wall of Horrors, Almscliff, UK, first-ever free solo at 6c+ or E3 6a.
- 1961 : Royal Robbins, Chuck Pratt and Tom Frost, lead Salathe Wall on El Capitan in 6-days (484 pitons, 13 bolts); 5.9 A4. Single push by Robbins & Frost in 1962.
- 1961 : John Gill free solos Thimble, in the Needles, South Dakota, USA, first-ever 7a+ (5.12a).
- 1962 : Claudio Barbier free solos the 57-pitch Comici Route on the Monte Civetta, Dolomites, Italy, at UIAA VI+.
- 1964 : Royal Robbins, Chuck Pratt, Tom Frost, and Yvon Chouinard do the first ascent of the North American Wall (28-pitches) on El Capitan, Yosemite, at 5.8/A5 it was hardest aid climbing route in the world.
- 1964 : Dan Robinson builds the first climbing wall at Leeds University. After training two years on the wall, John Syrett onsights, in 1970, one of Britain's hardest routes, Wall of Horrors (E3 6a); climbing walls spread everywhere.
- 1965 : Fritz Eske does the FFA of Königshangel, on Frienstein, Saxon Switzerland, Sax IXa, first 6c+ (5.11b/c).
- 1965 : Norwegian and British teams do the first ascent of Europe's tallest rock face, Norway's 4,000-foot Troll Wall.
- 1967 : July, Greg Lowe does the FFA, and onsight, of Macabre Roof, in Ogden, Utah, the first-ever roped climb at 7a+ (5.12a). and also first-ever multi-pitch at 7a+ (5.12a).
- 1967 : October, John Stannard does the FFA of Foops, in the Shawangunks, considered the first-ever 7a (5.11d).
- 1968 : Royal Robbins rope solos the big wall aid climb Muir Wall on El Capitan, Yosemite—first time El Capitan is climbed alone.
- 1968 : Reinhold Messner onsights the 4th pitch Messner Slab, a short crux on a 7-pitch FA, Central Pillar of Heiligkreuzkofel, Italy; it is now considered the first-ever pitch of 7a (5.11d) on a big wall.

== 1970s ==
- 1970 : Warren Harding and Dean Caldwell aid climb Wall of Early Morning Light / Dawn Wall (28-pitches), on El Capitan, at 5.8/A5.
- 1971 : John Stannard promotes clean climbing with a "nuts-only" logbook and Eastern Trade newsletter; the 1972 Chouinard Equipment Catalog includes influential articles promoting 'clean climbing' by Yvon Chouinard, Tom Frost, and Doug Robinson.
- 1973 : May, Henry Barber, free soloed, onsight the Steck-Salathe route (16-pitches) on Sentinel Rock, a notable on sight big wall free solo at 5.10a (6a) .
- 1973 : May, John Long does the FFA of Paisano Overhang, at Suicide Rock, California, latterly considered the first-ever 7b+ (5.12c).
- 1973 : October, Beverly Johnson, Sibylle Hechtel, first female team to ascend El Capitan via Triple Direct; Hechtel called it "Walls without Balls".
- 1973 : November, John Bragg does the FFA of Kansas City, in the Shawangunks, USA, first-ever 7b (5.12b).
- 1974 : Steve Wunsch does the FFA of Super Crack, in the Shawangunks, USA, first-ever consensus 7b+ (5.12c).
- 1975 : Jim Holloway solves Trice, in Boulder, Colorado, first-ever boulder at 8A+ (V12).
- 1975 : Steve Wunsch does the FFA of Psycho Roof (pitch 2), in Eldorado Canyon State Park, USA, considered the first-ever 7c (5.12d).
- 1975 : Charlie Porter solos the FA of the Northwest Face (40-pitches) of Mount Asgard, Baffin Island, one of hardest big wall aid climbs at 5.10 A4.
- 1975 : Ron Kauk, John Bachar, and John Long, do the FFA (alternating leads) of Astroman, in Yosemite. first-ever big wall at 5.11c (6c+); first continuous free ascent by Kauk in June 1977 who led all pitches.
- 1976 : Ron Fawcett free solos Slip 'n' Slide, in Crookrise, North Yorkshire, England, one of the first-ever free solos at E6 6a (5.11c X).
- 1977 : Ray Jardine does the FFA of The Phoenix, in Yosemite Valley, USA, first-ever 7c+ (5.13a); uses his new SLCDs.
- 1977 : Barbara Devine redpoints Kansas City, in the Shawangunk Mountains, USA, first-ever female 7b (5.12b).
- 1978 : Ron Kauk solves the famous Midnight Lightning, in Camp 4, Yosemite, considered one of the first-ever boulders at 7B+ (V8).
- 1978 : John Gill solves The Groove, in Pueblo, Colorado, USA, first-ever boulder at 7C+ (V10).
- 1978 : Ray Jardine sells the first spring-loaded camming device ("cams" or "friends"), revolutionising climbing protection.
- 1978 : Dave Diegelman, Dale Bard, Jim Bridwell do the FA of Sea of Dreams (27-pitches) on El Capitan, Yosemite, hardest-ever aid route at 5.9/A5 .
- 1979 : Tony Yaniro does the FFA of Grand Illusion, at Sugarloaf, Lake Tahoe, first-ever 8a (5.13b).
- 1979 : Lynn Hill redpoints Ophir Broke, in Telluride, USA, first-ever female 7c (5.12d).
- 1979 : John Bachar, free solos the "Nabisco Wall" (3-pitches), in Yosemite, first-ever multi-pitch free solo at 5.11c (6c+).
- 1979 : Spanish manufacturer Boreal creates a "sticky rubber" board-lasted climbing shoe, the Firé, which materially increases grip.

== 1980s ==
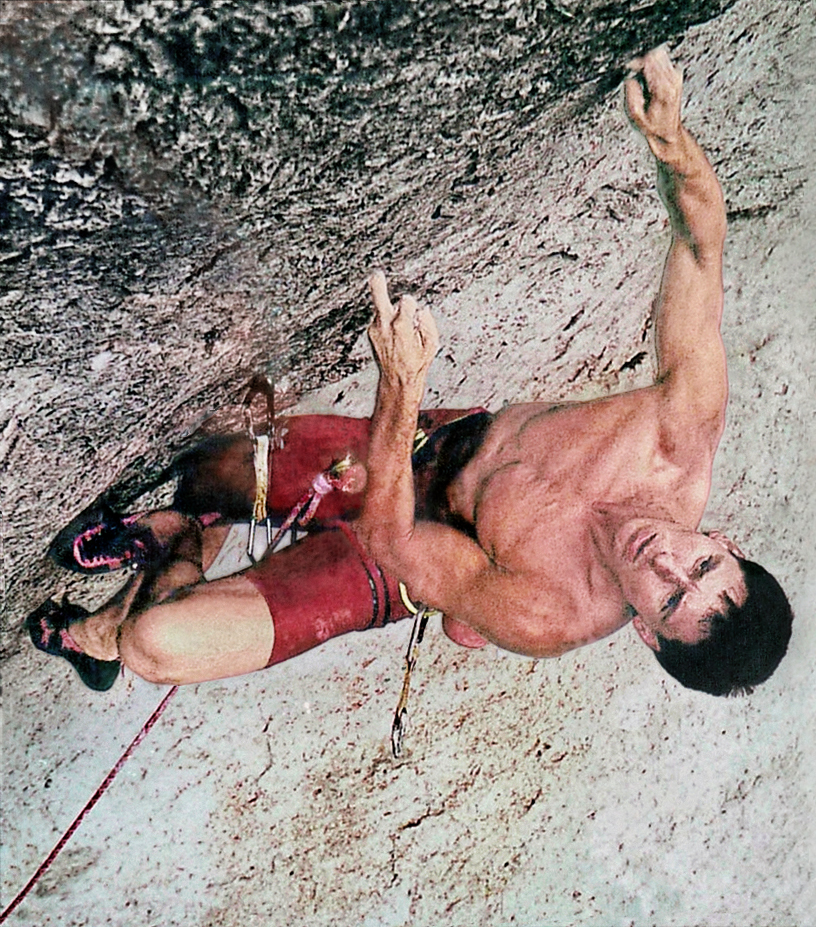
Wolfgang Güllich became the world's strongest sport climber by the mid-1980s and would set more new "hardest-ever" sport climbing routes than any other climber in history, and would revolutionize climbing training techniques.
- 1980 : Patrick Edlinger onsighted La Polka des Ringards, in Buoux, France, one of the first-ever onsights at 7c (5.12d).
- 1980: Sept, Chris Cantwell, Scott Burk,and Scott Cole free climb Hall of Mirrors in Yosemite CA, first big wall at 7b+ (5.12c); six pitches of 5.12, eight at 5.11.
- 1981: October, Dan Goodwin free soloed Mickey's Beach Crack, Stinson Beach, CA, first-ever free solo at 7b (5.12b).
- 1983 : Ron Fawcett does the FFA of Master's Edge at Millstone, England, first traditional route at E7 6c (5.12c R/X).
- 1983 : Jerry Moffatt does the FFA of The Face, in the Frankenjura, Germany, first-ever 8a+ (5.13c).
- 1984 : Lynn Hill redpointed Vandals, in the Shawangunks, USA, first-ever female 7c+ (5.13a)
- 1984 : Jerry Moffatt onsighted Pol Pot at Verdon Gorge, and The Phoenix at Yosemite, first-ever onsights at 7c+ (5.13a).
- 1984 : Wolfgang Güllich does the FFA of Kanal im Rücken, in Altmühl, Germany, first-ever 8b (5.13d).
- 1984 : Martin Scheel does the FFA of Amarcord, 7th Kirlichspitze, Switzerland, big wall at 7b+ (5.12c).
- 1985 : Spanish manufacturer Boreal makes a slip-lasted climbing shoe—the Boreal Ninja—becomes the template.
- 1985 : Catherine Destivelle redpointed Fleur de Rocaille, at Mouriès, France, first-ever female 7c+/8a .
- 1985 : Peter Croft free soloed the Rostrum, North Face, in Yosemite Valley, USA, big wall free solo at 5.11c (6c+).
- 1985 : August Antoine Le Menestrel free soloed Revelations, at Raven Tor, England, first-ever solo at 8a (5.13b).
- 1985 : Wolfgang Güllich does the FFA of Punks in the Gym, at Mount Arapiles, Australia, first-ever 8b+ (5.14a).
- 1985 : July 5–7, Stefan Glowacz and Catherine Destivelle win at Sportroccia, considered to be the first-ever proper International climbing competition, which was held on an outdoor natural rock surface in Bardonecchia, Italy.
- 1986 : Johnny Dawes does the FFA of Gaia at Black Rocks, End of the Affair at Curbar, and The Quarryman at Dinorwic, creating three of the hardest traditional routes in the world at the grade of E8/9 6c/7a (in film, Hard Grit).
- 1986 : Luisa Iovane redpointed Comeback, at Valle San Nicolo, Italy, first-ever female 8a (5.13b).
- 1986 : October 4, Johnny Dawes does the FFA of Indian Face, at Clogwyn Du'r Arddu, first-ever traditional route at E9 6c (5.13a X).
- 1986 : Wolfgang Güllich free soloed Weed Killer, at Raven Tor, Peak District, first-ever free solo at 7c (5.12d);
- 1986 : Jean-Baptiste Tribout redpointed To Bolt or Not to Be at Smith Rock (bolted by Alan Watts)—establishing sport climbing in the US.
- 1986 : Antoine Le Menestrel redpointed La Rage de Vivre, at Buoux, France, the first-ever 8b+/c .
- 1987 : Jean-Christophe Lafaille free soloed Rêve de gosse, at La Roche-des-Arnauds, France, first-ever free solo at 8a+ (5.13c).
- 1987 : Wolfgang Güllich redpointed Wallstreet, in the Frankenjura, Germany, Sax XI−, first-ever 8c (5.14b).
- 1987 : Peter Croft free soloed, after rehearsal, Astroman, in Yosemite; big wall free solo at 5.11c (6c+) (12-pitches).
- 1988 : Martin Scheel redpointed Via Acacia, 5th Kirlichspitze, Rätikon, Switzerland, first-ever big wall bolted climb at 7c+ (5.13a) (9-pitches).
- 1988 : Wolfgang Güllich invents the campus board to develop plyometrics training techniques that become standard for leading climbers.
- 1988 : Catherine Destivelle redpointed Chouca, at Buoux, France, first-ever female 8a+ (5.13c).
- 1988 : Isabelle Patissier redpointed Sortileges at Cimai crag, France, first-ever female 8b (5.13d).
- 1988 : Todd Skinner and Paul Piana do the FFA of the Salathe Wall, El Capitan, Yosemite, first-ever big wall route at 5.13b (8a); 4 pitches of 5.13, 4 of 5.12; is also the birth of free climbing on major El Capitan routes.
- 1988 : June 11–12, Patrick Edlinger and Catherine Destivelle win at Snowbird, Utah, first International climbing competition in the US.
- 1989 : Beat Kammerlander redpointed New Age, 7th Kirlichspitze, Switzerland, first-ever big wall bolted climb at 8a+ (5.13c) (5-pitches).
- 1989 : Simon Nadin and Nanette Raybaud, win the first annual UIAA Climbing World Cup, held over several legs during the year.

== 1990s ==
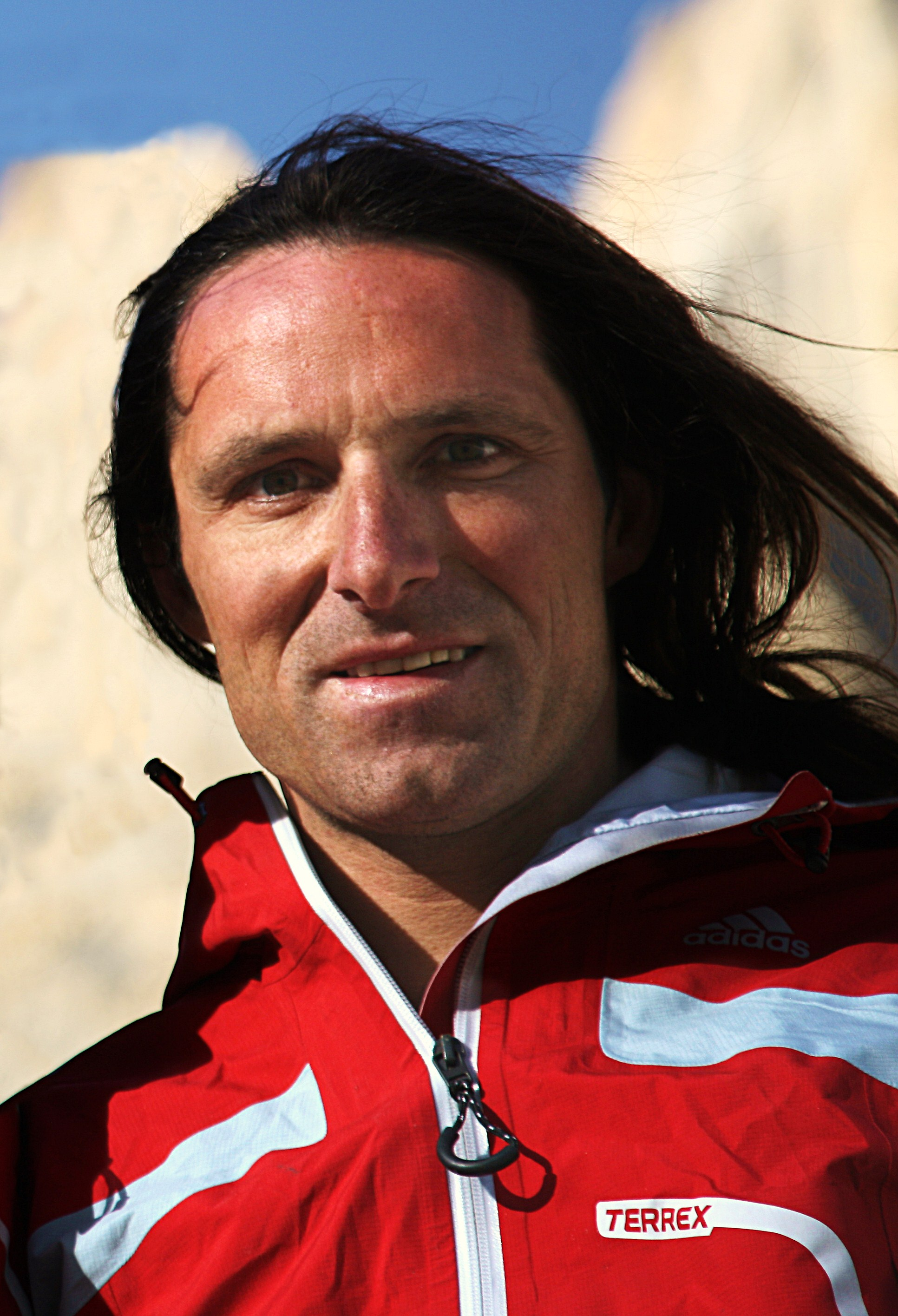
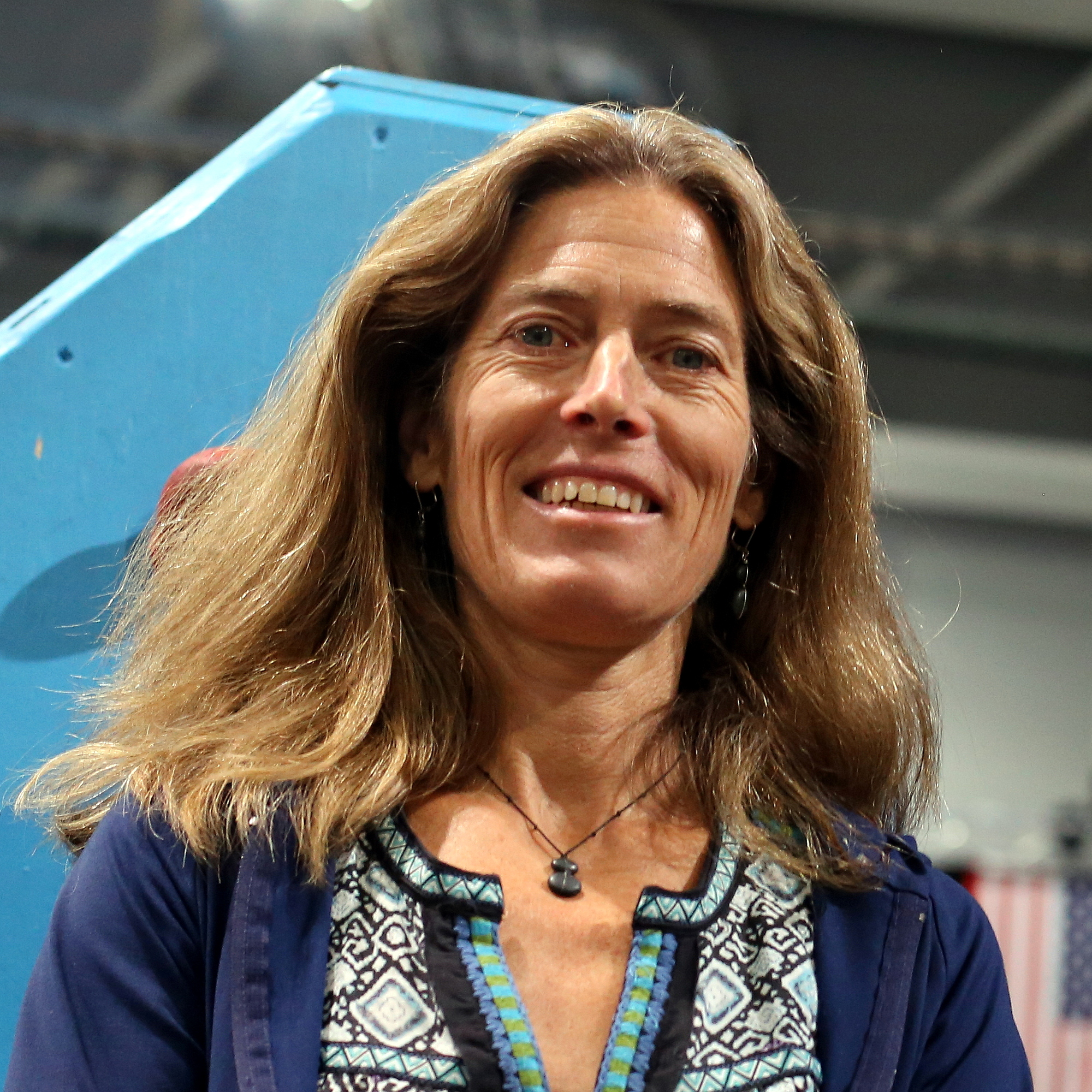
Alexander Huber and Lynn Hill were two of the most dominant rock climbers of the 1990s, setting "hardest-ever" records in both sport climbing and in big wall climbing.
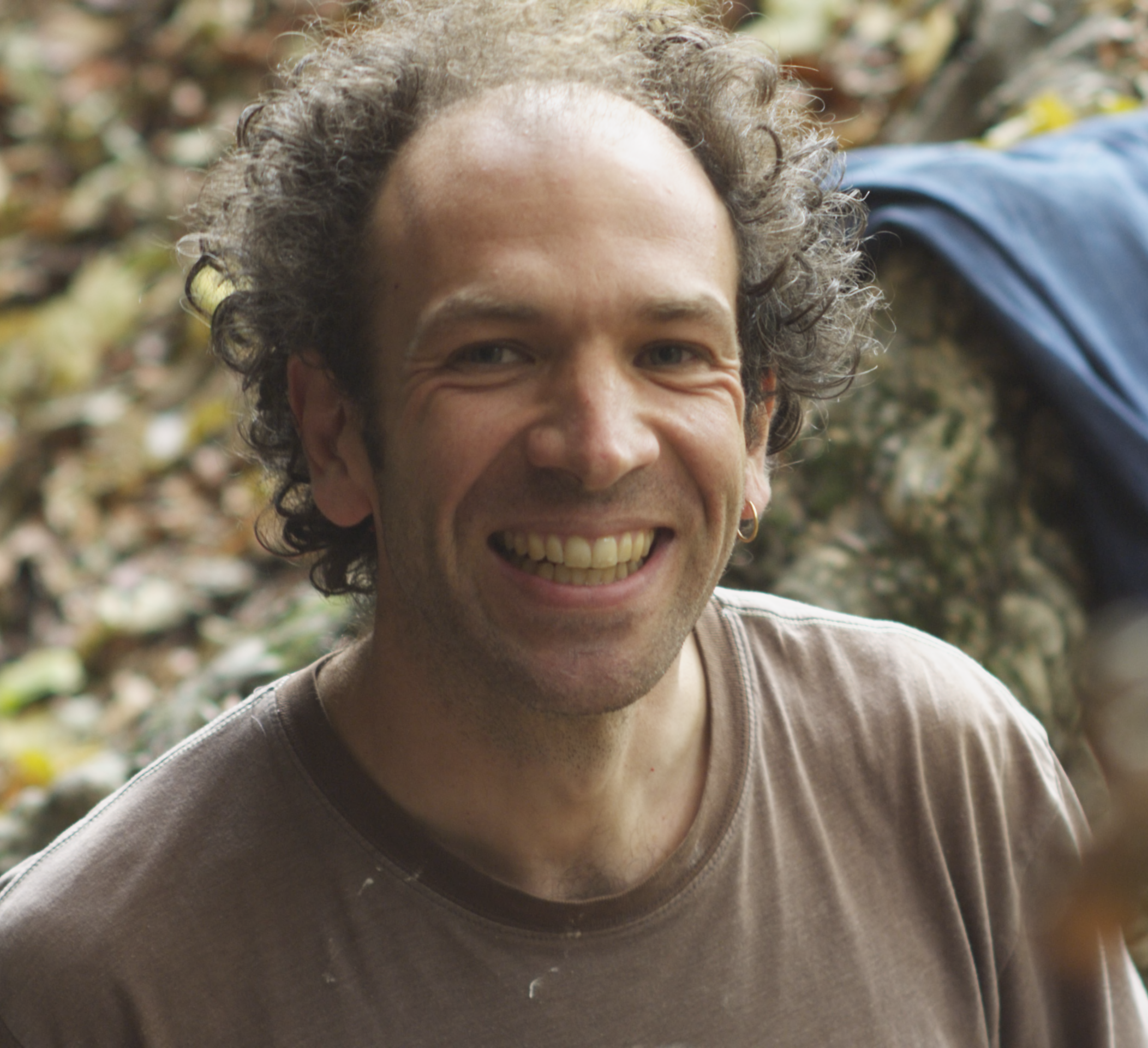
In the late 1990s and early 2000s, Fred Nicole revolutionized bouldering standards, setting many "hardest-ever" records.
- 1990 : May, Jerry Moffatt does the FFA of Liquid Ambar, at Pen Trwyn in Wales, first 8c+ (5.14c).
- 1990 : June 14, Ben Moon does the FFA of Hubble, at Raven Tor in England, first consensus 8c+ (5.14c), and possibly the first-ever 9a (5.14d).
- 1990 : Lynn Hill redpointed Masse Critique, at Cimai crag, France, first-ever female 8b+ (5.14a).
- 1990 : October, Catherine Destivelle solo climbs the 2,000 ft Bonatti Pillar, on the Petit Dru, at TD+ 5.9 A1, hardest-ever female solo of an Alpine big wall.
- 1991 : January, John Sherman publishes the Hueco Tanks Climbing and Bouldering Guide launching the now dominant V-grade rating system for bouldering.
- 1991 : Beat Kammerlander redpoints Neverending Story (11-pitches), 7th Kirlichspitze, Rätikon, first-ever big wall route at 8b+ (5.14a).
- 1991 : June, Catherine Destivelle solo climbed the first ascent of Voie Destivelle on the west face of the Petit Dru, at VI 5.11b A5, the hardest-ever female Alpine big wall.
- 1991 : September 14, Wolfgang Güllich does the FFA of Action Directe, in the Frankenjura, Germany, first-ever consensus 9a (5.14d); a ground breaking route.
- 1991 : October 1–2, François Legrand and Susi Good, win the first biennial UIAA Climbing World Championships, held in Frankfurt, Germany, which would later become the IFSC Climbing World Championships.
- 1992 : John Middendorf and Xaver Bongard do the FA of the 4,400 ft The Grand Voyage, on Great Trango Tower in Pakistan, hardest big wall aid climb at 5.10+, A4+ (and high altitude); longest 'vertical' rock-climbing route in history.
- 1992 : Lynn Hill onsights Simon, in the Frankenjura, Germany, first-ever female onsight at 8a (5.13b).
- 1992 : Fred Nicole solves La Danse des Balrogs, at Branson, Valais, Switzerland, first-ever boulder at 8B (V13).
- 1993 : Robyn Erbesfield-Raboutou onsights Overdose, at Lourmarin, France, first-ever female onsight at 8a/+ .
- 1993 : Lynn Hill does the FFA of The Nose on El Capitan, 3,000 ft., in Yosemite, first-ever female big wall at 5.14a (8b+), some considered it the biggest prize in big wall climbing at the time.
- 1993 : Alain Robert free solos Compilation in Omblèze, France, first-ever free solo of an 8b (5.13d).
- 1993 : Elie Chevieux onsights Liaisons Dangereuses, in Les Calanques, France, first-ever onsight at 8b (5.13d).
- 1993/94 : The completion of the "Alpine Trilogy", some of the hardest-ever alpine big walls at 8b+ (5.14a):
  - 1993/94 Beat Kammerlander does the FFA of Silbergeier (6-pitches), in Rätikon, Switzerland.
  - 1994 Thomas Huber does the FFA of The End of Silence (11-pitches), at Berchtesgaden, Germany.
  - 1994 Stefan Glowacz does the FFA of Des Kaisers neue Kleider (9-pitches), in Fleischbank, Austria.
- 1995 : Alexander Huber does the FFA (leading all pitches) of the Salathe Wall, El Capitan, Yosemite, first-ever big wall 5.13b (8a).
- 1996 : Catherine Miquel solves Miss World, in Fontainebleau, France, first-ever female boulder at 7C (V9).
- 1996 : Ron Kauk does the FFA of Magic Line, in Yosemite, first-ever traditional route at E10 5.14b (8c).
- 1996 : January, Fred Nicole solves Radja, at Branson, Valais, Switzerland, first-ever bouler at 8B+ (V14).
- 1996 : Alexander Huber does the FFA of Open Air, at the Schleierwasserfall in Austria, first-ever 9a+ (5.15a).
- 1996 : Elie Chevieux onsighted Massey Ferguson, in Calanques, France, first-ever onsight at 8b+ (5.14a).
- 1997 : Catherine Miquel solves Halloween, in Fontainebleau, France, first-ever female boulder at 7C+ (V10).
- 1998 : April, Josune Bereziartu redpoints Honky Tonky, at Onate, Spain, first-ever female 8c (5.14b).
- 1998 : October, Catherine Miquel solves Duel, in Fontainebleau, France, first-ever female boulder at 8A (V11).
- 1999 : April, Catherine Miquel solves Liaison Futile, in Fontainebleau, France, first-ever female boulder at 8A+ (V12).
- 1999 : June, Catherine Destivelle solos the Brandler-Hasse Route on Cima Grande di Lavaredo, at ED-: 5.10c A0, first female big wall free solo.
- 1999 : Christian Core and Stéphanie Bodet win the first annual UIAA Bouldering World Cup, held over several legs during the year.

== 2000s ==
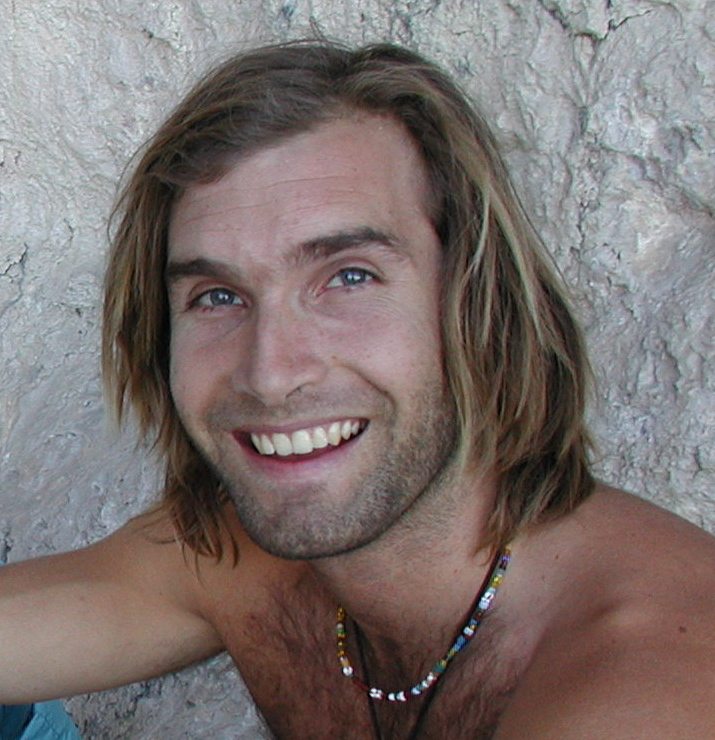
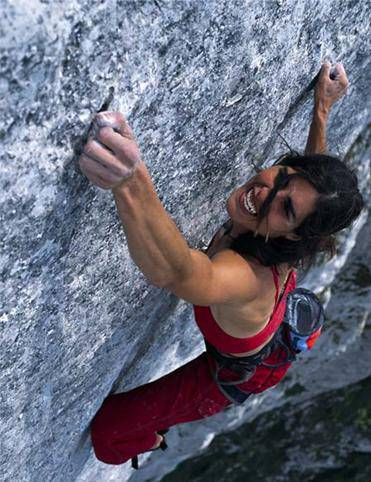
Chris Sharma and Josune Bereziartu were among the most dominant male and female rock climbers of the 2000s, each breaking new "hardest-ever" grades on multiple occasions
- 2000 : February 24, Neil Bentley does the FFA of Equilibrium, in Burbage, Derbyshire, one of the first-ever traditional routes at E10 7a 8c (5.14b) X.
- 2000 : April, Josune Bereziartu onsights Bon Vintage, in the Terradets, Spain, first-ever female onsight at 8a+ (5.13c).
- 2000 : June, Josune Bereziartu redpoints Honky Tonk Mix, at Oñati, in Spain, first-ever female 8c+ (5.14c).
- 2001 : July 18, Chris Sharma does the FFA of Realization/Biographie, at Céüse, France, first-ever consensus 9a+ (5.15a); a ground-breaking route at the time.
- 2001 : July 18, Alexander Huber redpoints the 1,000 ft Bellavista (10-pitches), on the Cima Ovest, Dolomites, Italy, first-ever big wall route at 8c (5.14b).
- 2002 : Alexander Huber free solos, the 1,500 ft Hasse-Brandler on the Cima Grande, Dolomites, first-ever big wall solo at 5.12a (7a+).
- 2002 : August, Fred Nicole solves Monkey Wedding and Black Eagle SDS, in Rocklands, South Africa, first-ever boulder at 8C (V15).
- 2002 : October 29, Josune Bereziartu redpoints Bain de Sang, at Saint-Loup, Switzerland, first-ever female 9a (5.14d).
- 2004 : October 6, Yuji Hirayama onsights White Zombie, at Baltzola, Spain, first-ever onsight at 5.14b (8c).
- 2004 : Alexander Huber free solos Kommunist in the Tyrol, Austria, first-ever free solo at 8b+ (5.14a).
- 2004 : December, Josune Bereziartu onsights Steroid Performance, in Horai, Japan, first-ever female onsight at 8b (5.13d).
- 2005 : May, Josune Bereziartu redpoints Bimbaluna, at Saint Loup, Switzerland, first-ever female 9a/9a+ .
- 2005 : Michael Reardon free solos, onsight, Romantic Warrior (10-pitches) in the Sierra Nevada, USA, first-ever big wall solo at 5.12b (7b).
- 2005 : October, Steph Davis does the FFFA of the 3,000 ft Salathe Wall, on El Capitan, in Yosemite, at 5.13b (8a).
- 2006 : April, Dave MacLeod does the FFA of Rhapsody, in Dumbarton Rock, U.K.; first-ever traditional route at E11 7a 8c+ (5.14c).
- 2006 : April, Josune Bereziartu onsights Hydrofobia, in the Montsant, Spain, first-ever female onsight at 8b+ (5.14a)
- 2006 : June, Sonnie Trotter does the FFA of Cobra Crack, in Squamish, Canada; one of the hardest-ever traditional routes at 5.14c (8c+).
- 2007 : Hansjörg Auer free solos Fish Route (35-pitches), on the Marmolada, Dolomites, Italy, first-ever big wall solo at 5.12c (7b+) .
- 2007 : January, the UIAA separates out competition climbing into the newly formed International Federation of Sport Climbing (IFSC), with a goal to make competition climbing an Olympic sport; in December, the International Olympic Committee granted the IFSC provisional recognition.
- 2007 : September 26, Chris Sharma does the FFA of Es Pontàs, in Mallorca, Spain, first-ever deep-water soloing route at 9a+ (5.15a).
- 2007 : December 11, Patxi Usobiaga onsights Bizi Euskaraz, at Etxauri, Spain, first-ever onsight at 8c+ (5.14c).
- 2008 : September 11, Chris Sharma does the FFA of Jumbo Love, at Clark Mountain, California, first-ever 9b (5.15b).
- 2008 : Christian Core solves Gioia, in Varazze, Italy, first-ever boulder at 8C+ (V16).
- 2008 : Beth Rodden does the FFA of Meltdown, in Yosemite, first-ever female traditional route at 5.14c (8c+).

== 2010s ==
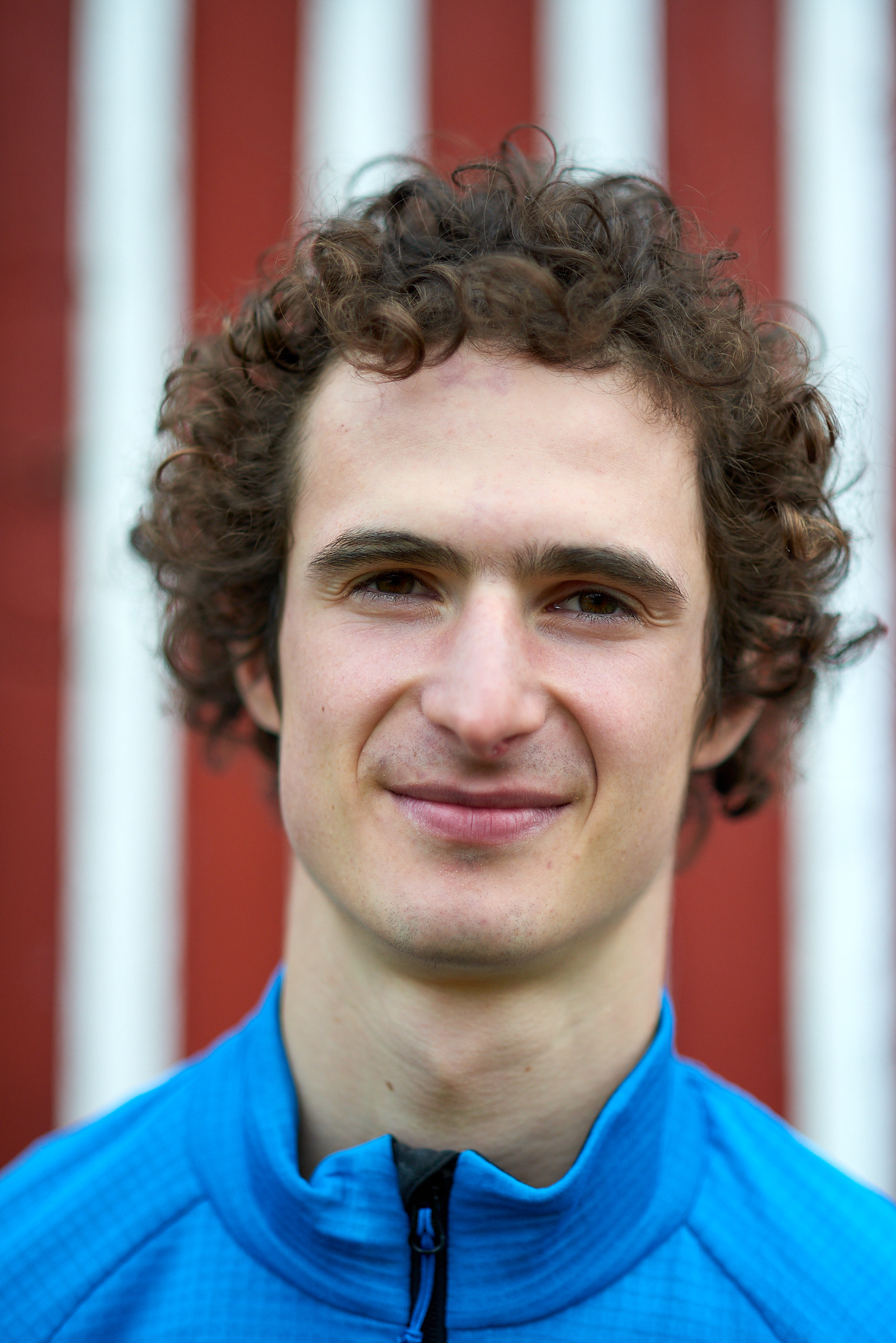
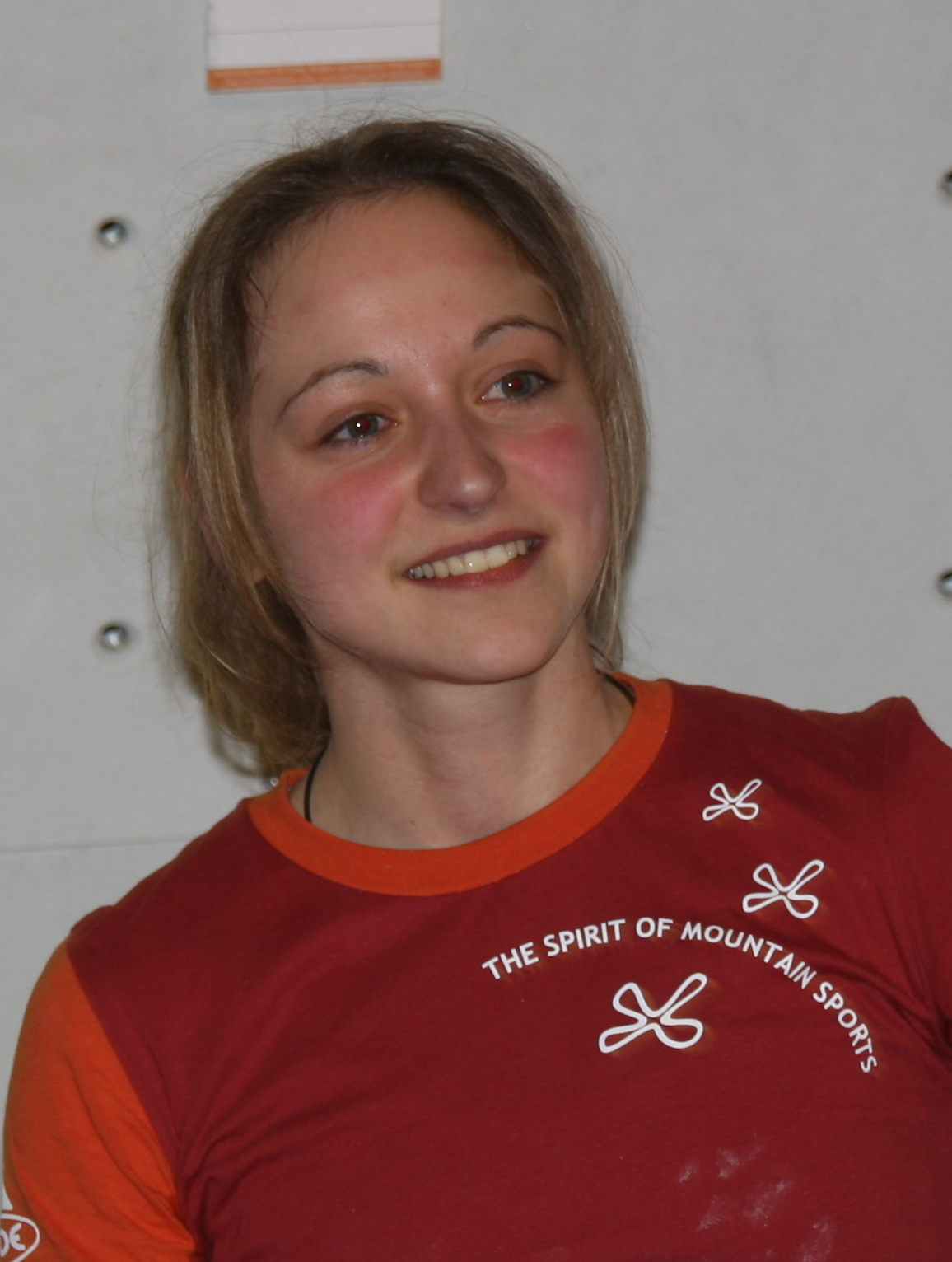
In the 2010s, Adam Ondra took on the mantle of "world's strongest climber" from Chris Sharma, with Angela Eiter the strongest female climber.
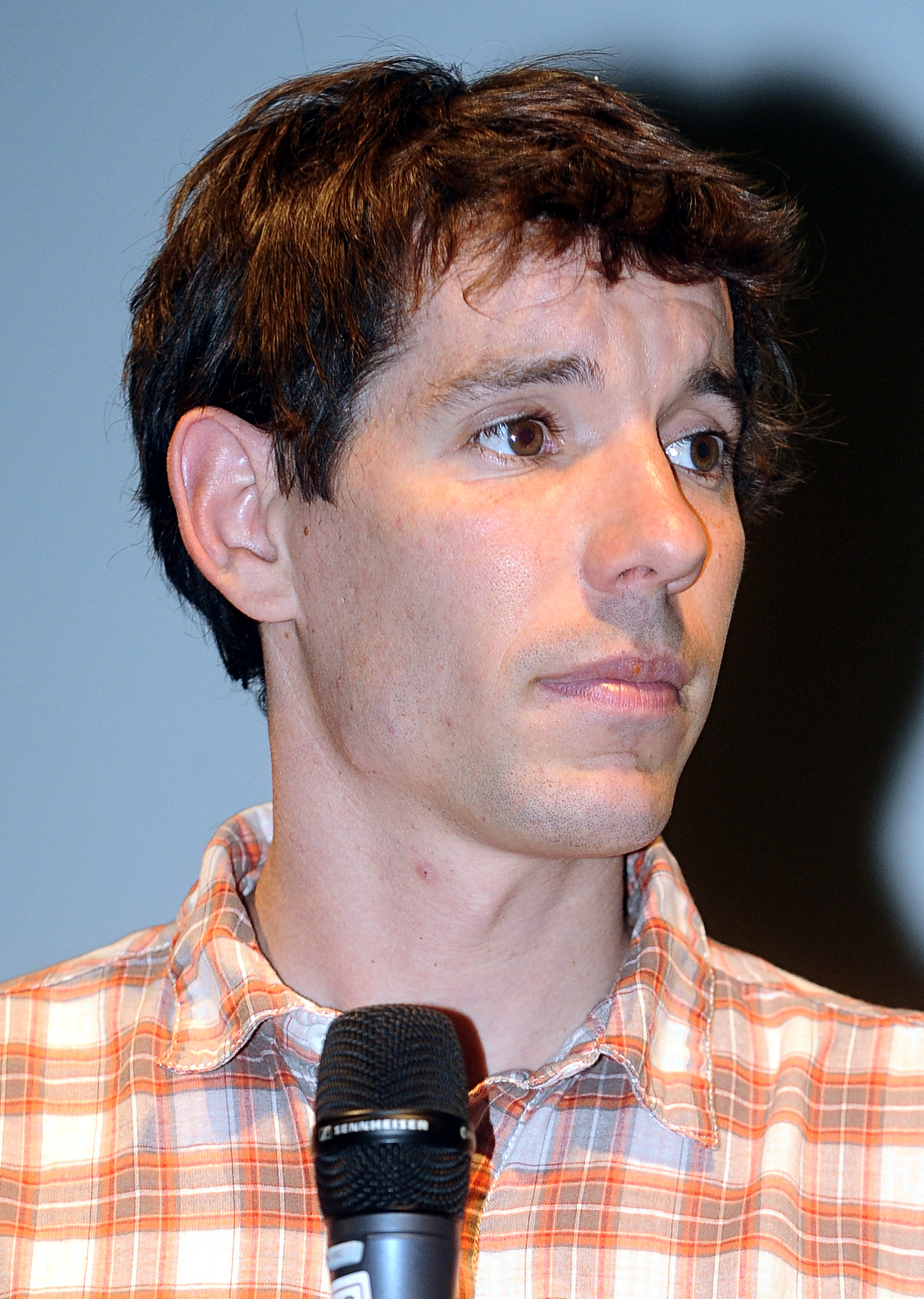
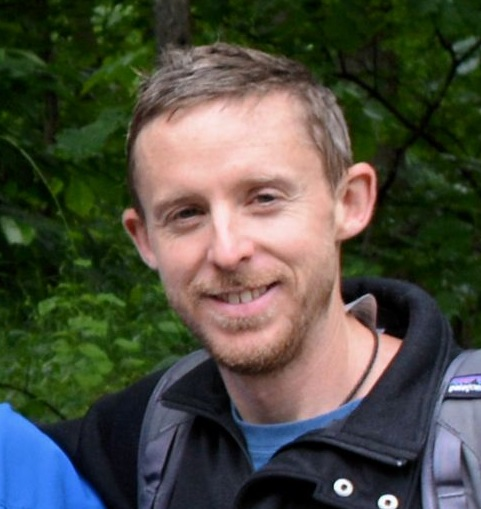
Alex Honnold (left) and Tommy Caldwell (right) made two of the most iconic climbs in history at Yosemite, both of which became Netflix films
- 2010 : August 17, Angie Payne solves The Automator, in RMNP, USA, first-ever female boulder at 8B (V13).
- 2012 : October 4, Adam Ondra does the FFA of Change, in Flatanger, Norway, first-ever 9b+ (5.15c).
- 2012 : October 20, Tomoko Ogawa solves Catharsis, in Shiobara, Japan, first-ever female boulder at 8B+ (V14).
- 2013 : February 7, Adam Ondra does the FFA of La Dura Dura, in Oliana, Spain, first confirmed 9b+ (5.15c).
- 2013 : March 24, Alexander Megos onsighted Estado Critico, in Siurana, Spain, first-ever onsight at 9a (5.14d).
- 2015 : January 14, Tommy Caldwell and Kevin Jorgeson do the FFA of the 3,000 ft The Dawn Wall, on El Capitan in Yosemite, first-ever big wall at 5.14d (9a) (in film, The Dawn Wall).
- 2016 : March 22, Ashima Shiraishi solves Horizon, at Mount Hiei, Japan, first-ever female boulder at 8C (V15).
- 2016 : August 3, the IOC announced that competition climbing would be a medal sport in a unique combined lead, bouldering and speed climbing event for the 2020 Summer Olympics.
- 2016 : October, Nalle Hukkataival solves Burden of Dreams, in Lappnor, Finland, first-ever boulder at 9A (V17).
- 2017 : February 26, Margo Hayes redpoints La Rambla at Siurana in Spain, first-ever female 9a+ (5.15a).
- 2017 : June 3, Alex Honnold free solos the 3,000 ft Freerider, on El Capitan in Yosemite, first-ever big wall free solo at 5.13a (7c+) (in film, Free Solo).
- 2017 : September 3, Adam Ondra does the FFA of Silence in Flatanger, Norway, first-ever proposed 9c (5.15d) (still unrepeated).
- 2017 : September 11, Anak Verhoeven does the FFA of Sweet Neuf, in Pierrot, France, first-ever female FFA at 9a+ (5.15a).
- 2017 : October 22, Angela Eiter redpointed La Planta de Shiva in Villanueva del Rosario, Spain, first-ever female 9b (5.15b).
- 2018 : February 10, Adam Ondra flashed Super Crackinette, in Saint Léger, France, first-ever flash (not onsight) at 9a+ (5.15a).
- 2019 : March, Jacopo Larcher does the FFA of Tribe in Val d'Ossola, Italy, first-ever traditional route at 5.14d (9a).
- 2019 : June, Janja Garnbret becomes the first climber to win every IFSC world cup event in a season in the 2019 Bouldering World Cup.

== 2020s ==
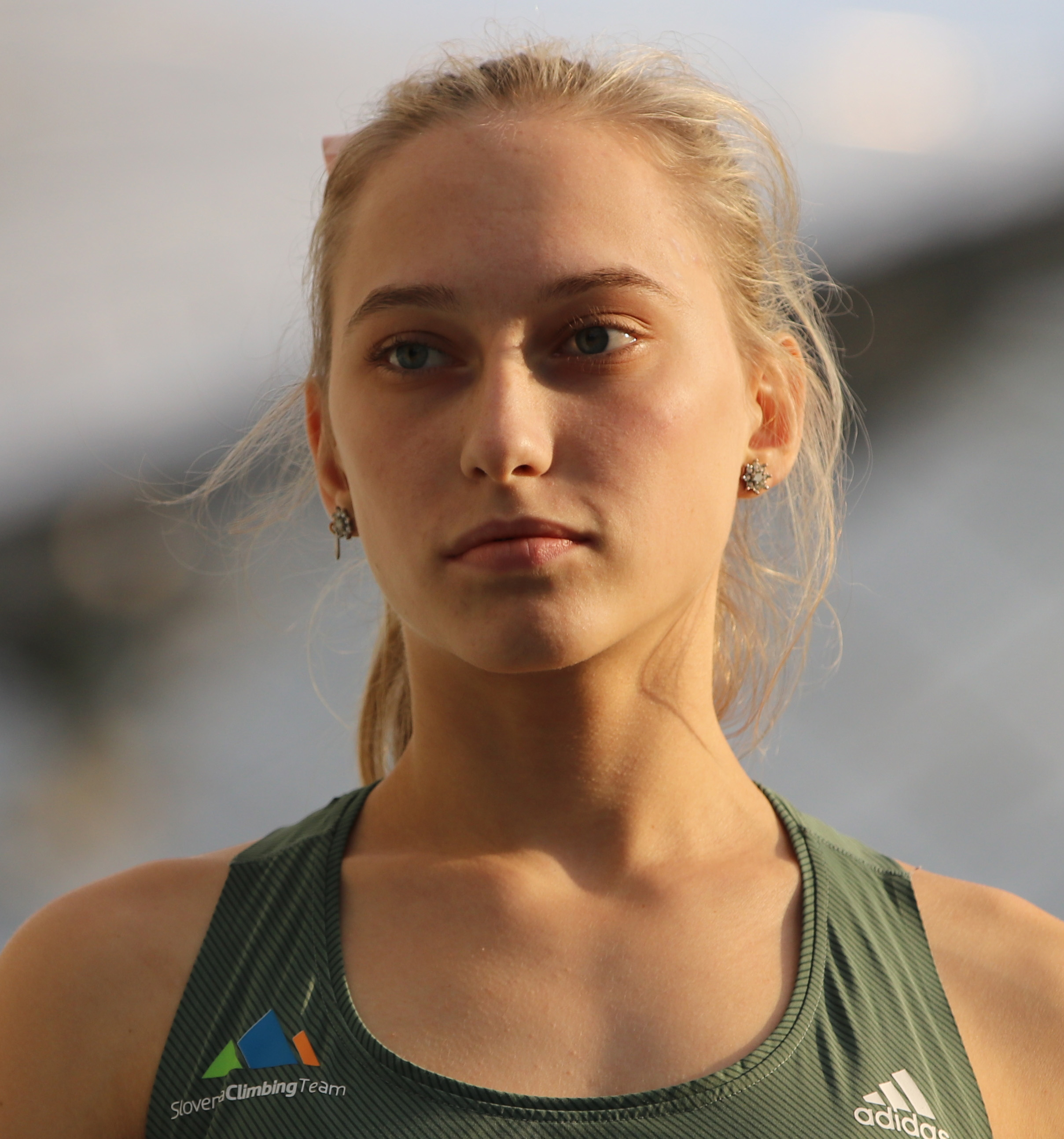
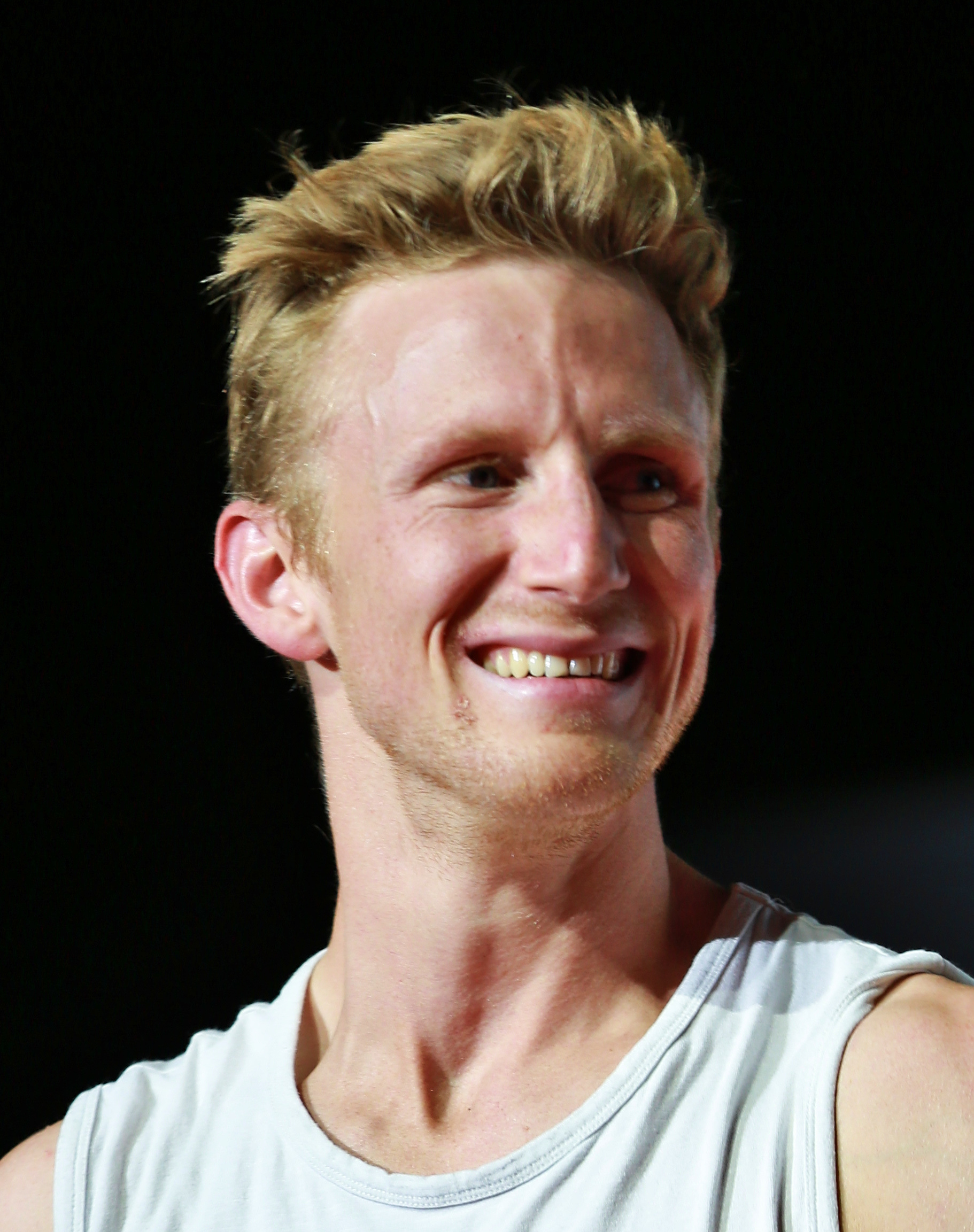
In the 2020s, Janja Garnbret and Jakob Schubert became the most successful female and male competition climbers of all time.
- 2020 : December 16, Angela Eiter does the FFA of Madame Ching in the Tyrol in Austria, first-ever female FFA at 9b (5.15b) (still unrepeated).
- 2021 : March, Alfredo Webber free solos Panem et Circenses in Arco, Italy, first-ever free solo at 8c (5.14b).
- 2021 : August 3–6, Alberto Ginés López and Janja Garnbret win the first-ever men's and women's Olympic competition climbing gold medals at the 2020 Tokyo Olympics in a combined lead climbing, bouldering and speed climbing event, a format unique to the 2020 Olympics.
- 2021 : September, Janja Garnbret becomes the most successful competition climber in history with 31 IFSC World Cup golds, at the Kranj leg of the 2021 IFSC Climbing World Cup.
- 2021 : November 1–4, Janja Garnbret onsights Fish Eye and American Hustle, in Oliana, Spain, first-ever female onsight at 8c (5.14b).
- 2023 : February, James Pearson does the FFA of Bon Voyage in Annot, France, first-ever traditional route at E12 9a (5.14d).
- 2024 : August 5–9, Toby Roberts and Janja Garnbret win the second-ever men's and women's Olympic competition climbing golds at the 2024 Paris Olympics in a combined lead and bouldering event; Veddriq Leonardo wins the men's speed, and Aleksandra Mirosław wins the women's speed.
- 2025 : April 5, Brooke Raboutou redpointed Excalibur in Arco, Italy, first-ever female 9b+ (5.15c).
- 2025 : April, 10, the IOC announces that lead climbing and bouldering will be standalone medal events in the 2028 Summer Olympics.
- 2025 : April, Katie Lamb solves The Dark Side, in Yosemite National Park, first-ever female boulder at 8C+ (V16).
- 2025: July 14, Connor Herson does the FFA of Drifter's Escape in Squamish, Canada, first-ever traditional route at 9a+ (5.15a).
- 2025 : July 28, Laura Rogora onsighted Ultimate Sacrifice in Gorges du Loup, France, first-ever female onsight at 8c+ (5.14c).
- 2025 : November, Elias Iagnemma solves Exodia, in Rifugio de Barbara, Italy, first-ever proposed boulder at 9A+ (V18).
- 2025: December 10, the International Federation of Sport Climbing (IFSC) is re-branded to World Climbing.

== See also ==
- History of Aid climbing
- History of Big Wall climbing
- History of Deep-water soloing
- History of Ice climbing
- History of Mixed climbing
- History of Sport climbing
- List of first ascents of mountain summits
- List of grade milestones in rock climbing
