= Josune Bereziartu =

Spanish rock climber

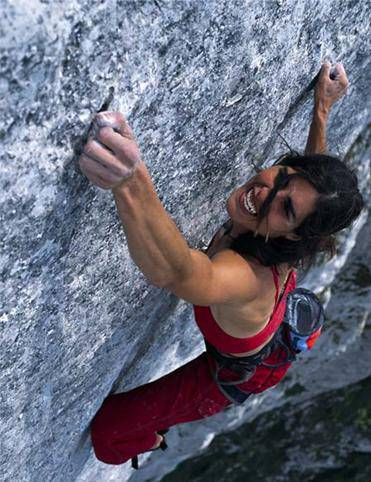
- Josune Bereziartu on Yeah Man, 2004

Personal information
- Nationality: Spanish
- Born: 19 January 1972 (age 54) Lazkao, Gipuzkoa, Spain
- Occupation: Financial services
- Height: 174 cm (5 ft 9 in)
- Weight: 57 kg (126 lb)
- Spouse: Rikar Otegui (m. 1999)

Climbing career
- Type of climber: Sport climbing, bouldering, Competition climbing, Traditional climbing, Alpine climbing
- Highest grade: Redpoint: 9a+ (5.15a); Onsight/Flash: 8b+ (5.14a); Bouldering: 8C (V15)
- First ascents: Yeah Man (8b+, 300m, 2002); El Pilar del Cantabrico (8a+, 500m, 2004); Super Weissmuller (8a+, 300m, 2007); Firenze (ED+ M7 R, 450m)
- Known for: First female to climb 8c (5.14b), 8c+ (5.14c), 9a (5.14d) and 9a/9a+ ; first female to onsight 8a+ (5.13c), 8b (5.13d), 8b+ (5.14a); first female to solve 8B+ (V14), 8C (V15)
- Updated on 20 January 2022

Josune Bereziartu (born January 19, 1972), also known as Josune Bereciartu Urruzola, is a Basque rock climber. For a decade starting in the late 1990s, she was considered the strongest female sport climber in the world and is regarded as one of the most important female rock climbers in history.

In 2005, Bereziartu almost completely closed the gap with the strongest male climbers by climbing to grade 9a/9a+ when the world's hardest climb was at 9a+/9b. She is known for being the first-ever female in history to climb grade 8c (5.14b), 8c+ (5.14c), 9a (5.14d) and 9a/9a+ sport climbing routes. Bereziartu is also known for being the first-ever female in history to onsight 8a+ (5.13c), 8b (5.13d), and 8b+ (5.14a) graded routes. She was one of the first-ever females to solve bouldering problems at 8A (V11) and above.

== Early life ==
Josune Bereziartu was born on January 19, 1972, in Lazkao, a Basque town of the province of Gipuzkoa, northern Spain. Josune was first inspired to climb after watching a Spanish TV show documenting two girls climbing in the Verdon Gorge, and started climbing at 17.

== Climbing career ==
In 1998, Bereziartu came to international attention with her repeat of Honky Tonky at Oñati, which made her the first-ever female in history to climb an 8c (5.14b) route. In 1999, she consolidated this achievement by repeating 8c routes White Zombie and Ras at Baltzola. In 2000, Bereziartu set a new record by becoming the first-ever female in history to climb 8c+ (5.14c) when she redpointed Honky Tonk Mix at Oñati. In October 2002, she set another record by becoming the world's first-ever female climber to climb a 9a (5.14d) route, when she redpointed Fred Nicole's Bain de Sang in St Loup, Switzerland. In 2004, she climbed Logical Progression in Japan, another 9a (5.14d) route that was only freed a few years earlier by Dai Koyamada. In May 2005, she set a further record, becoming the first-ever female to climb 9a/9a+ when she redpointed Bimbaluna in St Loup, in Switzerland; at that time, no male climber had broken the 9b (5.15b) grade barrier, and it would be another three years until Chris Sharma would climb Jumbo Love, the world's first consensus 9b route.

Bereziartu also set new records for onsight ascents. In 2000, she made the first-ever female onsight of an 8a+ (5.13c) route in history when she climbed Bon Vintage at Terradets in Catalonia, Spain. In 2002 she made the first-ever female onsight of an 8b (5.13d) route in history when she climbed Steroid Performance at Horai in Japan. Finally, in 2006, she made the first-ever female onsight of an 8b+ (5.14a) route in history when she climbed Hidrofobia in Montsant, Catalonia.

Bereziartu was a keen bouldering climber, in which she also set several records. In 2001, she became the second-ever female to solve an 8A (V11) problem, with Berezi, and in 2002, became the second-ever female to solve an 8A+ (V12) problem with Solaris. In 2002, she became the first-ever female to complete an 8B+ (V14) boulder traverse, when she solved La traversia De Balzola, at Baltzola in the Basque Country. In 2004, she pushed the female record further by completing the 8C (V15) boulder traverse, E la nave va, Lindental, at Lindental in Switzerland.

Bereziartu has also followed the path of earlier female sport climbers like Lynn Hill and Catherine Destivelle, freeing old aid climbing routes into major new multi-pitch traditional climbing routes in the mountains, such as Yeah Man (8b+, 300m, 9 pitches, with Rikar Otegui) in 2002, and El Pilar del Cantabrico (8a+, 500m, 13 pitches, with Iker Pou) in 2004, and Super Weissmuller (8a+, 300m, 8 pitches, with Rikar Otegui) in 2007. In March 2008, Bereziartu and Otegui created a new seven-pitch alpine route on the north face of Peña Telera, called Frenesi (ED+ M7 R, 450m, 7 pitches), while in late 2008 they were climbing hard mixed ice routes in Banff, such as Nemesis (VI WI6), and Phyllis Diller (M11).

Bereziartu participated in few climbing competitions which reduced her sponsorship profile, preferring instead the feel of real rock, and the challenge of bringing female sport climbing to the highest grades. In 2001, she told PlanetMountain when asked about the state of female sport climbing: "What can I say about that? It looks as if women are only present in competitions. It's obvious that this isn't the case but there are so few women climbing hard outside". Talking about her choices in a 2021 Climbing interview, she said: "Looking at my career with the perspective of age, I’ve learned that it’s important to maintain your freedom and to follow the things that excite you—not what others expect you to do".

== Legacy ==
In 2003, Climbing awarded her the Golden Piton Award for the sport climbing category (and an honorable mention in the 2004 bouldering category), calling her "hands down, the world’s top female redpoint climber, with numerous extreme bouldering endurance tests to her credit". In 2005, she was named one of National Geographic's Adventurers of the Year, for her ascent of Bimbaluna. In 2006, she was awarded one of the first Arco Rock Legends awards (known as the Oscars of climbing), the Salewa Rock Award, for her contribution to sport climbing. In 2007, reporting on her freeing of multi-pitch alpine routes, Alpinist said: "This climb serves as yet another testament to Bereziartu's prowess; since the late 90s, Bereziartu has worked to push the limits of female climbing in various disciplines".

In 2008, Climbing called her "the strongest female rock climber in the world". National Geographic noted that at the height of her career in the early to mid-2000s, "She was also climbing two or three grades harder than any other woman". A 2017 Climbing magazine review of the history of women's climbing noted that "In the late 1990s and early 2000s, the Basque Josune Bereziartu became the world’s best female sport climber", and that she had "dramatically narrowed the gap between men and women". In 2021, PlanetMountain, ranked Bereziartu as one of the most important female climbers in history, saying: "In short, from 1998 to 2005 Bereziartu's hegemony on rock was absolute. With these redpoints, and with her first female 8b+ onsight completed in 2006, Bereziartu reduced the gender gap on multiple occasions, inspiring thousands of other climbers. In addition to these physical achievements, it is worth dwelling on how they were carried achieved: always with absolute modesty, always with a smile".

== Personal life ==
In 1999, Bereziartu wedded her long-term climbing partner, Rikar Otegui, who himself climbs to 8b+ (5.14a). Bereziartu was not always a full-time professional climber, and during the week, Bereziartu sold insurance and investments for a Spanish insurance company, Mapfre in the early 2000s. In addition, Bereziartu designed resin holds to sell for indoor climbing walls.

== Notable ascents ==
=== Redpointed routes ===
9a/9a+ (5.14d/5.15a):

- Bimbaluna – Saint Loup (SUI) – May 1, 2005; world's first-ever female ascent of a 9a/9a+ route.

9a (5.14d):

- Logical Progression – Jo Yama (JPN) – November 22, 2004; world's second-ever female ascent of a 9a route.
- Bain de Sang – Saint Loup (SUI) – October 29, 2002; world's first-ever female ascent of a 9a route.

8c+ (5.14c):

- Powerade – Vadiello (ESP) – May 21, 2007; world's fourth-ever female ascent of an 8c+ route.
- Na Nai – Baltzola (ESP) – June 18, 2003; world's third-ever female ascent of an 8c+ route.
- Noia – Andonno (ITA) – October 18, 2001, world's second-ever female ascent of an 8c+ route.
- Honky Tonk Mix – Onate (ESP) – 2000, world's first-ever female ascent of an 8c+ route.

8c (5.14b):

- Ras at Baltzola – Baltoza (ESP) – 1999, world's third-ever female ascent of an 8c route.
- White Zombie – Baltoza (ESP) – 1999, world's second-ever female ascent of an 8c route.
- Honky Tonky – Onate (ESP) – 1998, world's first-ever female ascent of an 8c route.

=== Onsighted routes ===
8b+ (5.14a):

- Hidrofobia – Montsant (ESP) – April 18, 2006; world's first-ever female onsight of an 8b+ route.

8b (5.13d):

- Fuente de energia – Valdiello – November, 2005; world's third-ever female onsight of an 8b route.
- La Réserve – St Léger (FRA) – October 1, 2005; world's second-ever female onsight of an 8b route.
- Steroid Performa – Japan – December 28, 2004; world's first-ever female onsight of an 8b route.

8a+ (5.13c):

- Bon Vintage – Terradets – Valdiello – 2000; world's first-ever female onsight of an 8a+ route.

=== Boulder problems ===
8C (V15):

- E la Nave va – Lindental (SUI) – May 10, 2003 - Traverse; world's first-ever female ascent of 8C boulder traverse.

8B+ (V14):

- Travesia De Balzola – Baltzola (ESP) – April 6, 2002 - Traverse world's first-ever female ascent of an 8B+ boulder traverse.

8A+ (V12):

- Solaris – Baltzola (ESP) – April 15, 2003; only the second-ever female ascent of an 8A+ boulder problem after Catherine Miquel ascended Liaison Futile in 1999.

8A (V11):

- Berezi – Larraona (ESP) – 2000. Only the second-ever female ascent of an 8A boulder problem after Catherine Miquel ascended Duel in 1998.

=== Multi-pitch routes ===
- El Castillo de los Sacristanes 8a+ (5.13c), 400-metres, 10 pitches – Ordesa Park (ESP) – 2009 – First free ascent with Rikar Otegui.
- Zaratustra 8a+ (5.13c), 400-metres, 10 pitches – Ordesa Park (ESP) – 2008 – Fully free ascent with Rikar Otegui.
- El Ojo Critico – 8a (5.13b), 400-metres, 10 pitches – Ordesa Park (ESP) – July 6, 2007 – First free ascent with Rikar Otegui.
- Super Weissmuller 8a+ (5.13c), 300-metres, 8 pitches – Petit Pic De Ansabere (FRA) – June 2007 – First free ascent with Rikar Otegui.
- Divina Comedia 7c (5.12d) A2, 275-metres, 11 pitches – Ordesa Park (ESP) – July 2006 – First free ascent with Rikar Otegui.
- Yeah man 8b+ (5.14a), 300-metres, 9 pitches – Grand Pfad (SUI) – July 1, 2004 – First free ascent with Rikar Otegui.
- El Pilar del Cantabrico 8a+ (5.13c), 500-metres, 13 pitches – Naranjo de Bulnes (ESP) - July 2002 - First free ascent with Iker Pou.

=== Mixed ice routes ===
- Firenze (ED+ M7 R), 450m, 7 pitches – Peña Telera (North Face) (ESP) – March 2008 – First free ascent with Rikar Otegui.

== Awards ==
- Arco Rock Legends, Salewa Rock Award, 2006.
- National Geographic, Adventurers of the Year, 2005.
- Climbing Magazine, Golden Piton Award (Sport Climbing), March 2003.

== Filmography ==
- Documentary on Bereziartu: Manuel Rojo, Carmen Portilla (director) (2012). Viviendo al filo con Josune Bereziartu (Motion picture). RTVE.
- Documentary on climbing in Naranjo de Bulnes: Sebastián Álvaro, Manuel Rojo (director) (2002). La ola perfecta (Motion picture). RTVE.

== See also ==
- List of grade milestones in rock climbing
- History of rock climbing
- Catherine Destivelle, one of the greatest female sport climbers of the 1980s
- Lynn Hill, one of the greatest female sport climbers of the 1980s and early 1990s
