= John Gill (climber) =

American mathematician (born 1937)

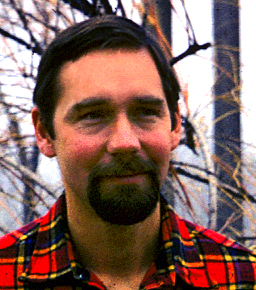
- John Gill in 1968

Personal information
- Nationality: American
- Born: February 16, 1937 (age 89)
- Website: www.johngill.net

Climbing career
- Type of climber: Bouldering
- Updated on 12 December 2015

John Gill (born 16 Feb 1937) is an American mathematician who has achieved recognition for his rock climbing. He is widely considered to be the father of American bouldering.

== Early life and professional career ==
As a child, Gill lived in several southern U.S. cities, including Atlanta, Georgia, where he graduated from Bass High School in 1954. He attended Georgia Tech from 1954 to 1956, and graduated from the University of Georgia with a degree in mathematics in 1958. He entered the U.S. Air Force as a second lieutenant, and also attended a special graduate meteorology program at the University of Chicago in 1958 and 1959. He was assigned to Glasgow AFB in Montana until 1962, and resigned from the USAF Reserves as a captain several years later.

After obtaining a master's degree in mathematics from the University of Alabama in 1964, Gill became an instructor at Murray State University from 1964 to 1967. In 1967 he enrolled as a graduate student at Colorado State University, and received his PhD in classical complex analysis in 1971. His dissertation on Möbius transformations was supervised by Arne Magnus.

During his career as a college professor, Gill wrote approximately thirty research papers on the analytic theory of continued fractions, complex functions, linear fractional transformations, and related topics. He also started a minor mathematical journal entitled Communications in the Analytic Theory of Continued Fractions with John McCabe of St Andrews University, served terms as mathematics department chair, president of the Sigma Xi (research) Club, Board of Governors of the Mathematical Association of America, and received an Outstanding Faculty Award. Gill retired as professor of mathematics from the University of Southern Colorado in 2000.

== Bouldering ==
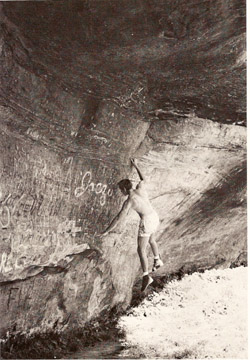
John Gill, performing a dynamic move at Pennyrile Forest, KY in the mid-1960s.

John Gill began mountain and rock climbing in 1953 as a traditional climber. By the mid-1950s he had begun to specialize in very short, acrobatic routes on outcrops and boulders, establishing problems in the 1950s and early 1960s considerably harder than those existing at the time.

=== A modern perspective ===
Being a gymnast and thinking of climbing as an extension of gymnastics rather than hiking, in the mid-1950s he introduced the use of gymnastic chalk into American rock climbing. The use of chalk then spread internationally throughout the climbing world. At the same time he introduced controlled dynamics, recommending it as a technique of choice, as well as one of necessity. As for bouldering specifically, Gill's article, "The Art of Bouldering", published in the journal of the American Alpine Club in 1969 describes the sport of bouldering, the modern version of an activity that in the past had been viewed as informal training for longer climbs.

According to Alpinist magazine, "His introduction of chalk and dynamic movement marked the beginning of modern climbing in America."

Gill's climbing style showed the influence of formal gymnastics. He emphasized form and grace of motion over simple efficiency, the cornerstone of contemporary climbing. His performances, as recorded on film taken when he was forty (Disciples of Gill, 2009), 2013 John Gill Exercising (a), and forty-five John Gill bouldering at age 45 from "On the Rocks" - movie, demonstrate straight lines and minimal contact with the rock. He preferred an application of strength and sometimes avoided efficient moves like the heel hook, which he considered unaesthetic. Gill's approach to bouldering—artistic style being on par with difficulty—was rarely followed by climbers of his generation and is considered unusual today, difficulty remaining paramount. He also practiced bouldering as a form of moving meditation.

Although certainly not the first serious boulderer—his notable predecessors include Oscar Eckenstein (1859–1921) and Pierre Allain (1904–2000)— Gill was probably the first climber in the history of rock climbing to make bouldering his primary specialty and to advocate acceptance of bouldering as a legitimate sport in its own right. His focus on bouldering and the high difficulty level climbs he established inspired a number of traditional climbers to take a more serious view of the sport, which, for the most part had been seen merely as training for longer roped climbs.

After retiring, Gill spent several years researching the origins of rock climbing, particularly bouldering. He also compiled a chronicle of bodyweight feats associated with climbing. These results, along with a history of gymnastic rope climbing, may be found on his website.

Gill received the 2008 American Alpine Club's Pinnacle Award for outstanding climbing achievement. He received one of the club's highest awards, Honorary Membership, in 2023.

=== Early bouldering & short climbs ===
Gill on Red Cross Rock Eliminate V9. With initial fingertip hold on the right the problem is V7.

In the Tetons, in 1958, John Gill climbed a short route on Baxter's Pinnacle that lies in the 5.10 realm, before that grade was formally recognized—one of the first to be done in America. By the end of the 1950s, Gill had reached what would now be considered V9 levels on a few eliminate boulder problems. (He later stated he probably never progressed beyond V10 throughout his climbing career.).

Two of his problems on Red Cross Rock in the Tetons—a V8 in 1957 and a V9 in 1959—set new standards of bouldering difficulty. And his 1961 route on a steep face of a small granite spire named the Thimble (Needles of South Dakota)—an unrehearsed and unroped 30-foot 5.12a free-solo climb (or V4 or V5 highball)— is considered one of the great classics of modern climbing, and—may be the first at the 5.12 grade. Gill climbed the route without the benefit of modern climbing shoes, significantly increasing the difficulty of the climb.

=== "B" Grading system ===
In the 1950s, John Gill introduced a very early—if not the first—grading system specifically designed for bouldering and not restricted to a particular area. The system, (B1, B2, B3), had two subjective levels of difficulty, and one objective level, and was predicated on prevailing and future standards attained in traditional rock climbing. The introduction of sport climbing some twenty years later and more intense competition weakened the philosophical underpinnings of the three-tiered structure, although climbers such as Jim Holloway adopted personal three-level systems similar to Gill's. Today, Gill's B-system is rarely used, abandoned in favor of open-ended grading systems such as the V-scale.

== Longer climbs—free solo explorations ==
From his early ascent of the east face of Longs Peak in 1954, throughout his climbing career until he left the sport in the early 2000s, a recurring theme of Gill's climbing was exploratory free soloing (at times with a light rappel rope) - usually, but not always, at moderate levels of difficulty. In fact, the Thimble—which he considered a climb and not a boulder problem - was a test of how far he was willing to go in that direction. Once he completed a route (most were unreported) he might return to it, perhaps many times, to enjoy the continuous movement and flow of the climb.

== Gymnastics and strength exercises ==
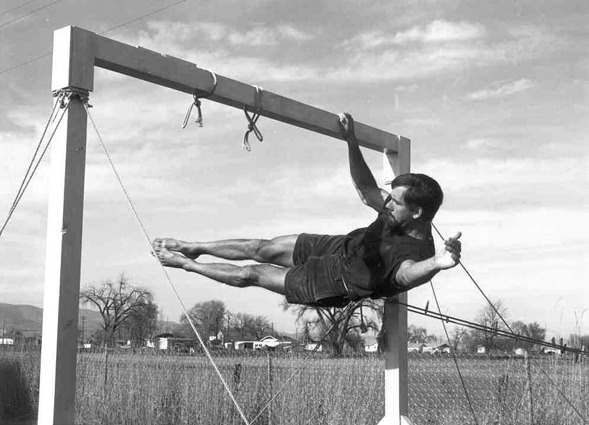
John Gill, performing a one arm front lever in the late 1960s. Gill is known for his applications of gymnastics to rock climbing.

As an amateur gymnast in the 1950s, 6 feet 2 inches (1.88 m) and 180 pounds (82 kg), Gill specialized in the competitive rope climb and the still rings, achieving a time of 3.4 seconds for the 20' rope climb (from seated position on the floor, arms only). The existing record—set in the 1950s - is 2.8 seconds. He accomplished a number of difficult stunts on the rings, including inverted and olympic crosses, giant swings, and slow pulls from hang to handstand. He also engaged in what are now called bodyweight exercises similar to gymnastics, achieving seven one-arm pullups with the right arm and five with the left, several one-finger one-arm pullups, one-arm pullups carrying twenty pounds, one-arm pullups on a one-half inch ledge, and one-arm front levers.

== Magazine articles and interviews ==
- Climbing (1976, 1996, 2000) (USA)
- Mountain (1977, 1986) (Britain)
- Iwa To Yuki (1984, 1992) (Japan)
- New Age Journal (1985) (USA)
- High (1986) (Britain), Outside (1989) (USA)
- Rock & Ice (1993, 1997, 2005)) (USA)
- Flash Communique (1993) (USA)
- Roc'NWall (1995) (France)
- VBouldering (1995) (USA)
- Math Horizons (1997) (USA)
- RotPunkt (2000) (Germany)
- Klettern (2003) (Germany)
- GÓRY (2003) (Poland)
- Montana (2003) (Czech Republic)
- Outsider (2004) (Ireland)
- Alpinist (2005) (USA)
- Campobase (2006) (Spain)
- Urban Climber (2006) (USA)
- Hoogtelijn (2007) (Netherlands)
- Climb (2007) (Britain)
- Rock & Snow (2015) (Japan)

== See also ==
- John Sherman, a pioneer in modern bouldering
- Fred Nicole, a pioneer in modern bouldering
- History of rock climbing
- List of grade milestones in rock climbing
