= Georg Winkler =

German mountain climber

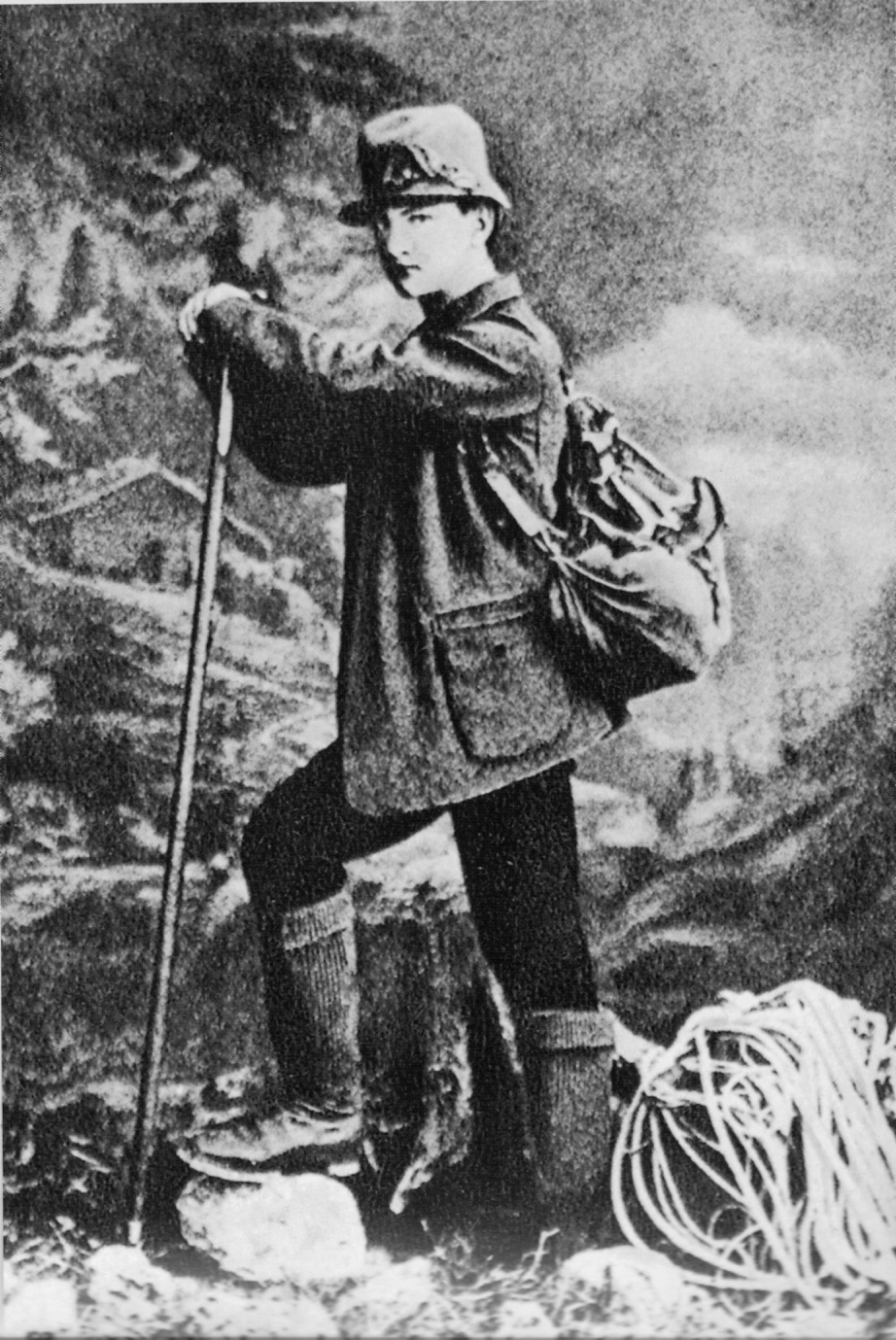
Georg Winkler 1888, photo taken by Anton Karg

Georg Winkler was a climber famed for his solo ascents which included the Winkler Turme in the Vajolet Towers in 1887, at the age of 17. He was killed by an avalanche on the face of the Weisshorn in 1888.
