= Hans Dülfer =

German alpinist

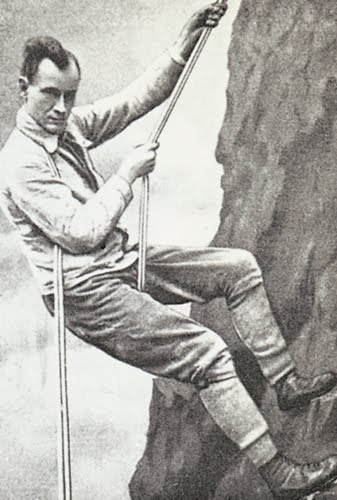
Hans Dülfer

Hans (Johannes Emil) Dülfer was a German mountain climber (23 May 1892 in Barmen / Wuppertal – 15 June 1915 in Arras).

Dülfer started studying medicine from 1911 in Munich, and then changed to law and later to philosophy. The proximity of the Alps enticed him to make 50 first ascents, particularly the Kaisergebirge (in the Northern Limestone Alps) and in the Rosengarten in the Dolomites.

- 1911 Dülfer-Kamin am Totenkirchl (literal English: Duelfer chimney at the dead church)
- 1912 Fleischbank-Ostwand (literal English: meat-bank east wall)
- 1913 Dülfer-Riss der Fleischbank (literal English: Duelfer crack of the meat bank)

Dülfer developed several early climbing techniques, such as the Dülfersitz rappel, a basic emergency abseil skill.

He died in World War I, on the battlefield at Arras.
