= Dülfersitz =

Classical abseiling technique

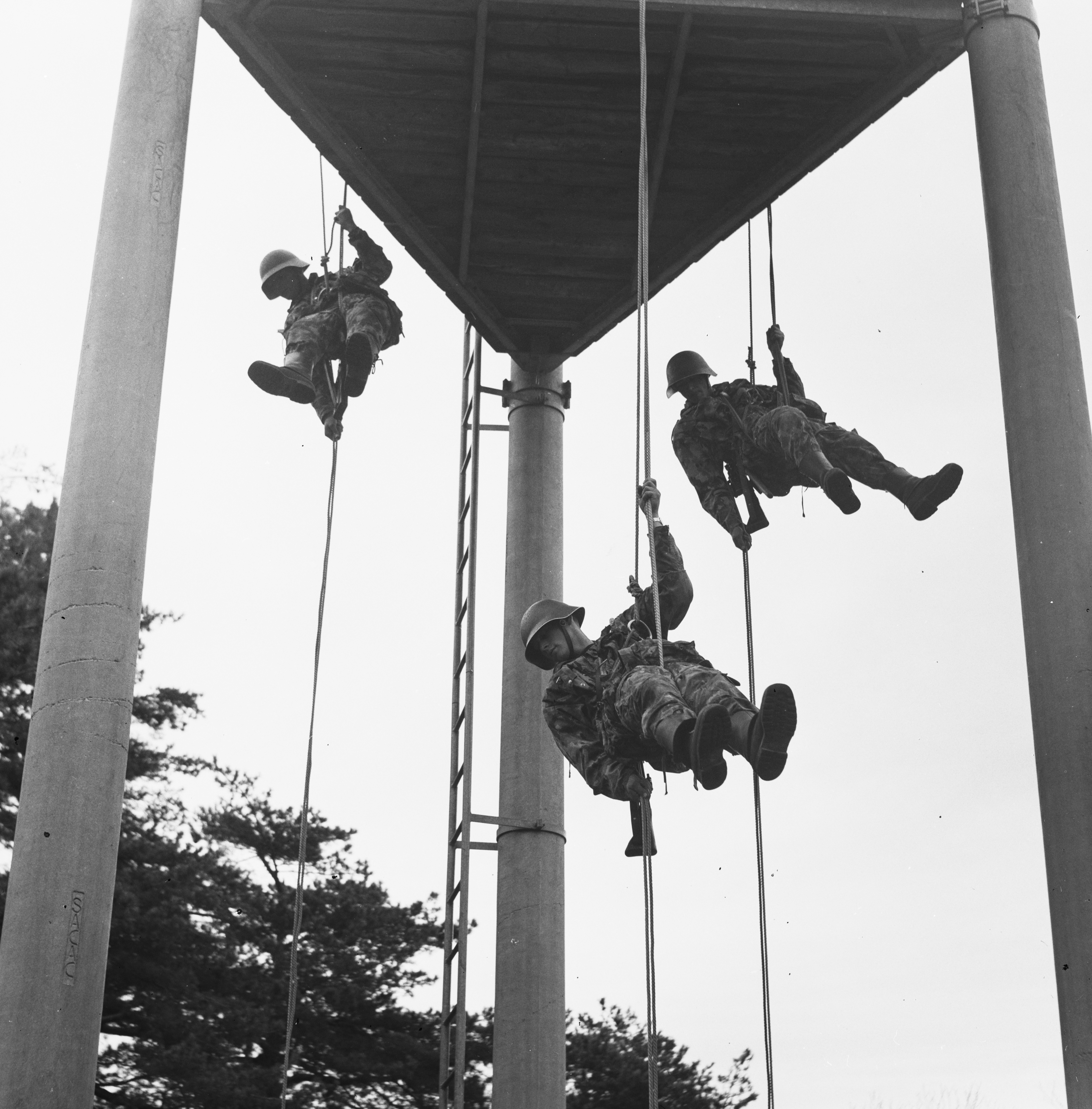
Swiss soldiers abseiling using the Dülfersitz

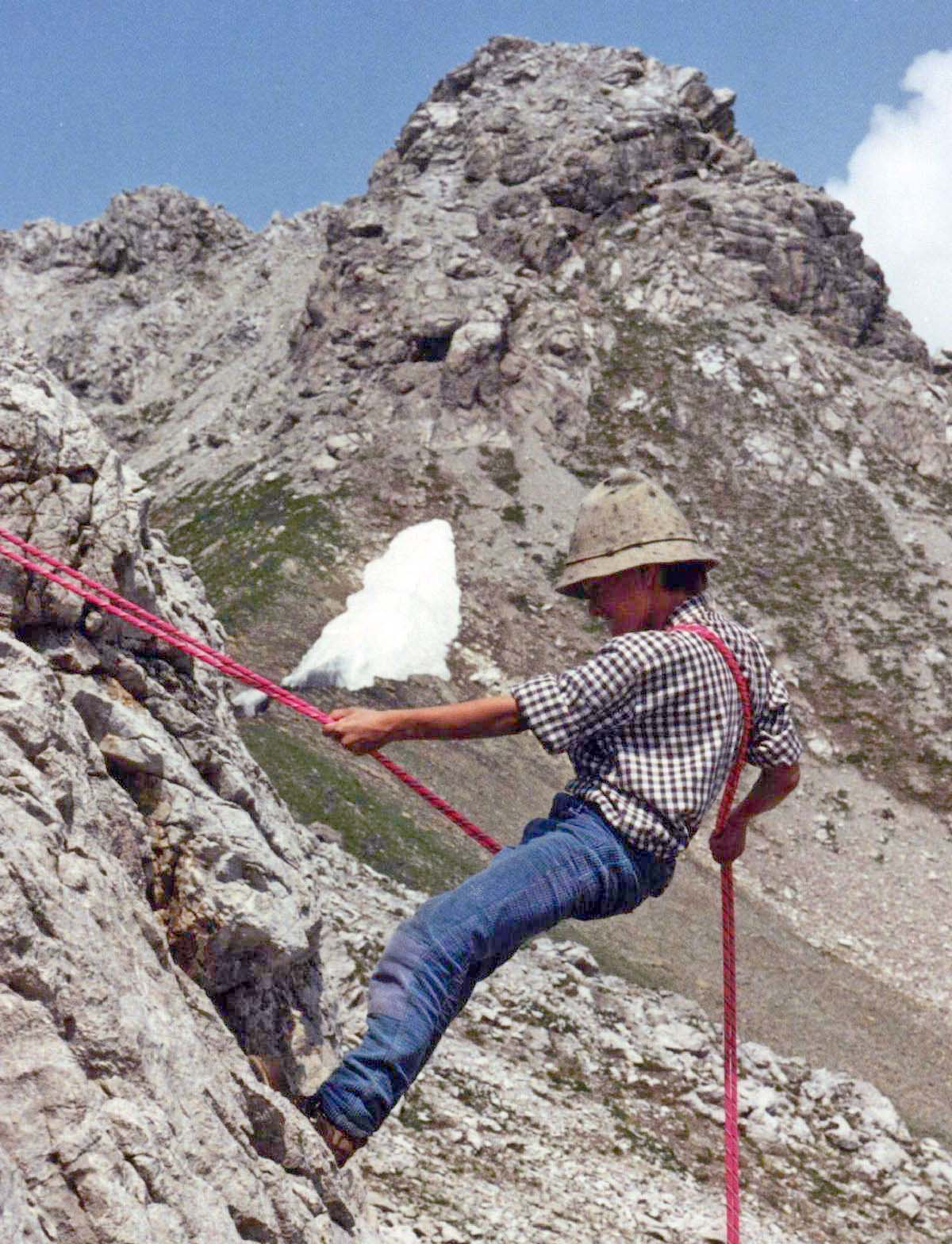
Abseiling by means of the Dülfersitz (not free-hanging)

The Dülfersitz (named after mountaineer Hans Dülfer who had developed a different but related technique), also known as body rappel, is a classical, or non-mechanical abseiling technique, used in rock climbing and mountaineering. It is not used frequently any more, since the introduction of belay devices. In the Dülfersitz, the rope is wound around the body, and the speed of descent is controlled using the friction of the rope against the body.

The advantages of the Dülfersitz are that one can descend without a climbing harness or belay device, and because the rope is not kinked or subjected to concentrated forces, it does not experience as much wear. The major disadvantage of this method is that intense heat is generated by the friction on the shoulder, neck and thigh, which can be painful, and can damage clothing.

== Technique ==
- The doubled rope is passed between the legs
- The rope is passed behind one thigh
- Crossing the chest, the rope is taken to the opposite shoulder
- From the shoulder, the rope is passed diagonally across the back to the braking hand (the hand on the same side as the thigh around which the rope has been passed)
- The rope is placed under load
- The free hand is held forward, maintaining the balance
- The braking hand controls the movement of the rope: to allow the rope to move, the braking hand moves backwards; to arrest movement, it moves forwards.

Although the Dülfersitz is an effective method of abseiling when practised correctly, it is less safe than some modern methods: if the braking hand releases the rope (due to panic, impact from a falling stone, or cramp), a fall is unavoidable if no additional means of security, such as prusik cords, is used.
