= Cathy Miquel =

French rock climber

Catherine Miquel
Personal information
- Occupations: Artist and rock climber
- Height: 157 cm (5 ft 2 in)

Climbing career
- Type of climber: Bouldering; Sport climbing
- Highest grade: Bouldering: 8A+ (V12)
- Known for: First-ever woman to climb boulder grades of 7C (V9), 7C+ (V10), 8A (V11), and 8A+ (V12)

Catherine "Cathy" Miquel is a French artist and rock climber who specialises in bouldering. She is known for being the first-ever woman in the world to solve boulder problems at the grade of 7C (V9), 7C+ (V10), 8A (V11), and 8A+ (V12).

== Bouldering ==
Miquel began bouldering in Fontainebleau in the 1980s. She quickly distinguished herself on difficult routes. In 1989, she became the first female climber to successfully complete Le Carnage V8 (7B/7B+). In 1996, she was the first woman to boulder V9 (7C) with Miss World. In 1997, she achieved V10 (7C+) with Halloween.

In 1998, she was the first woman to solve an 8A (V11) boulder when she climbed the Duel at Franchard Cuisiniere, Greater Fontainebleau. That year she completed V11 Sale gosse assis. In 1999 she completed V12 Liaison Futile.

In 2002, she was the first woman to complete an 8B boulder problem, when she climbed Trafic in the Bois des Hauts de Milly. It would be over 15 years before another woman would ascend Trafic. Miquel remains active as a climber today, three decades on from her first ascents.

In 2003, Miquel began creating ephemeral art installations in the Fountainebleau forest, where many of her bouldering feats were accomplished. The art uses found materials and is designed in a way to respect nature, without polluting the environment.

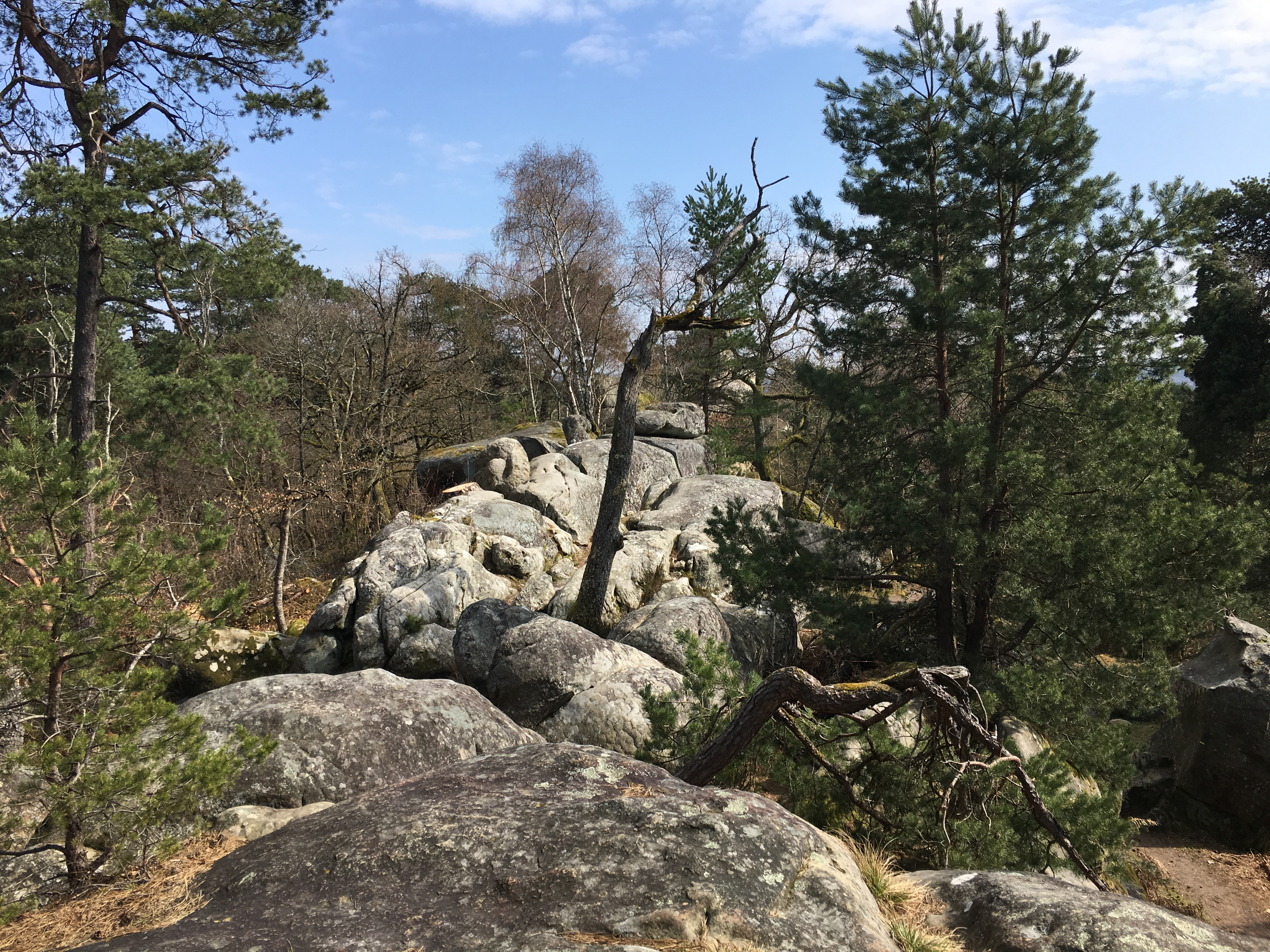
Forest of Fontainebleau, where Miquel would make her most famous bouldering ascents.

== Filmography ==
- Tour de blocs, 2002
- Sauvage, 2000
- Bleau, 1999

== See also ==
- Fontainebleau rock climbing
