= Vajolet Towers =

Mountain in the Dolomites

Vajolet towers
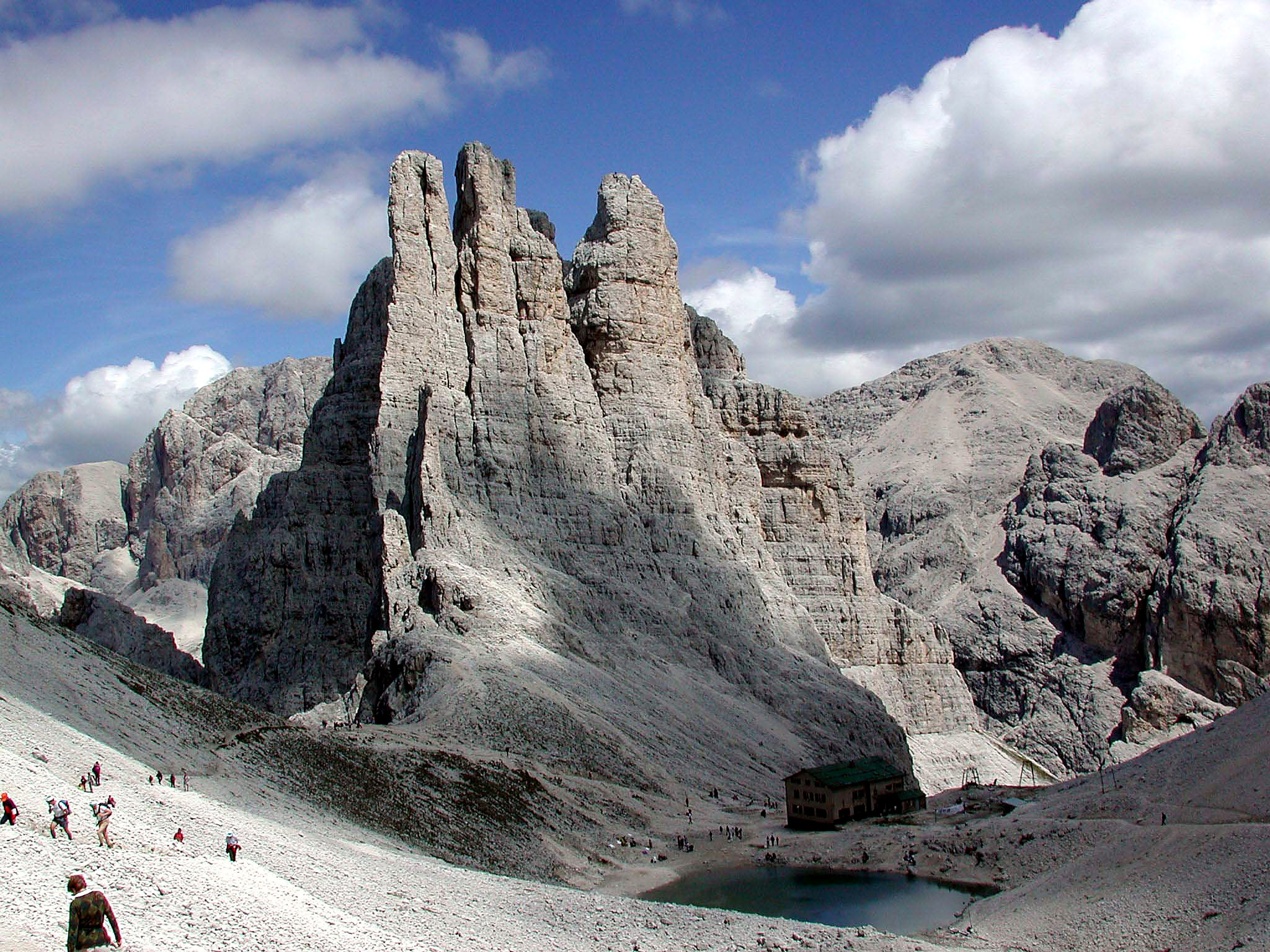

Highest point
- Elevation: 2,821 m (9,255 ft)
- Coordinates: 46°27′34″N 11°37′16″E

Geography
- Location within Alps Location within Italy
- Location: Italy
- Parent range: Dolomites

The Vajolet towers are six summits in the Dolomites between the Fassa Valley and the Tiers Valley, on the border between the Trentino and South Tyrol in Italy.
