= Pierre Allain =

French boulderer and alpinist

- Born: Pierre Jean Allain; 7 January 1904; Mirebeau
- Died: 19 December 2000 (aged 96); Saint-Martin-d'Uriage

Pierre Allain (7 January 1904 – 19 December 2000) was a French alpinist and an innovator of climbing equipment.

== Early climbing ==
Allain began climbing in the 1920s. In the 1930s he was joined by several others at Fontainebleau, where his group of "'Bleausards" developed a love of bouldering that went beyond simple training for the Alps. The famous Allain Angle (V2 – V3), done in 1934, is a testament to their dedication and to the resulting elevation of standards. In Allain's 1949 book, Alpinisme et Competition, he expresses his appreciation of this simple and understated climbing specialty.

In 1935, between 31 July and 1 August, he made the first ascent of the north face of the Petit Dru with Raymond Leininger. Their climbing equipment comprised a 7mm hemp rope, six carabiners, no crampons and only one ice-axe.

== Equipment development ==
To facilitate the rock-climbing experience he developed – in the 1930s – the first rubber-soled, soft shoes specifically engineered for serious rock work. He wore these on the sandstone boulders as well as on the granite walls of the Alps, where he made several famous first ascents, including the north face of the Aiguille du Dru. These shoes, known as "PAs", became the model for future generations of climbing footwear. Indeed, the version available in the 1950s looked remarkably like modern climbing footwear.

In the 1950s Allain opened a mountaineering store in Paris, where he offered the first lightweight carabiners which were made using modern alloys. Prior to that time, these indispensable snaplinks were made of heavy steel. His other innovations encompassed rappel devices, down jackets and climbing shoes. His brand name then became "EB", out of his associate's name Edmond Bourdonneau who purchased the store from him in 1950.

When Allain's name comes up these days, it is more frequently in connection with his pioneering bouldering efforts at Fontainebleau.
