= List of grade milestones in rock climbing =

Historic single pitch, multi-pitch and boulder climbs

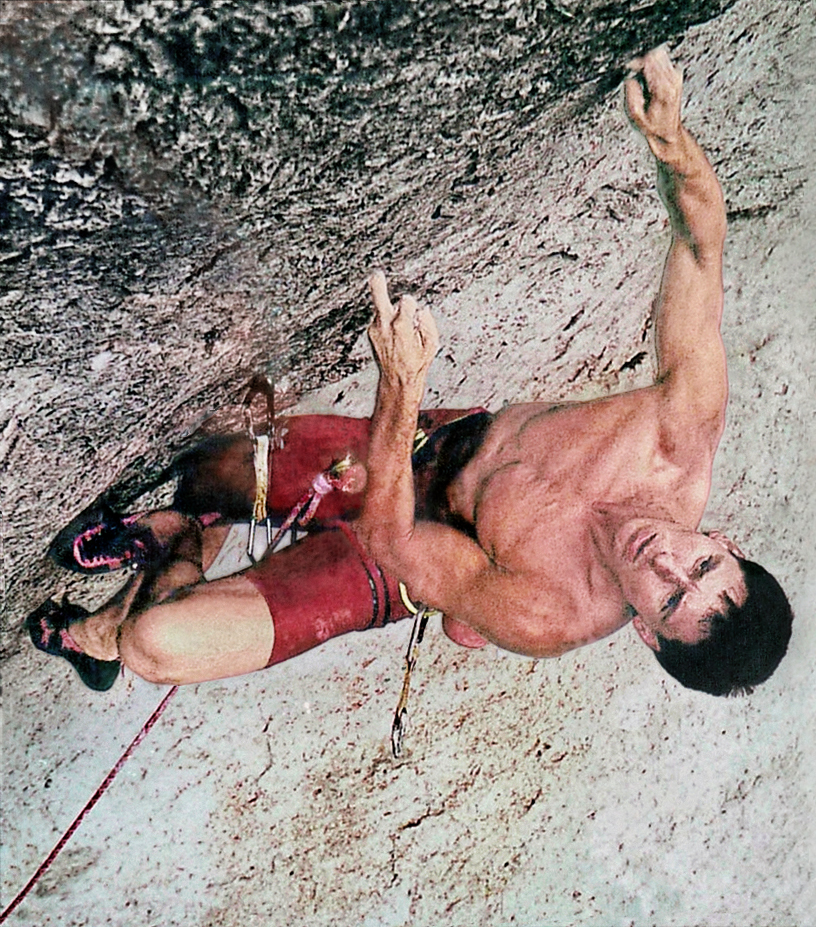
Wolfgang Güllich set new "hardest-ever routes" multiple times.

In rock-climbing, a first free ascent (FFA) is the first redpoint, onsight or flash of a single-pitch, multi-pitch or bouldering climbing-route that did not involve using aid equipment to help progression or resting—the ascent must thus be performed in either a sport, a traditional, or a free solo manner. First-free-ascents that set new grade milestones are important events in rock climbing history, and are listed below. While sport climbing has dominated grade milestones since the mid-1980s (i.e. are now the highest grades), milestones for modern traditional-climbing, free-solo-climbing, onsighted and flashed-ascents, are also listed.

A climbing route's grade is provisional until enough climbers have repeated it to establish a "consensus". At the highest grades, this can take years as few climbers are capable of repeating these routes. For example, in 2001, Realization was considered the world's first 9a+ (5.15a), however, the first repeat of the 1996 route Open Air, which only happened in 2008, suggested that it was possibly the first 9a+ (5.15a). Open Air has had no further repeats, and has had holds broken since 1996, whereas Realization has had many ascents and is thus a "consensus" 9a+. Thus, the 2nd to 4th ranked candidates are also recorded.

As of October 2026, the hardest-ever redpoint of a single-pitch rock-climbing route is at the technical grade of 9c (5.15d) for men and 9b+ (5.15c) for women. The hardest onsight is at 9a (5.14d) for men and 8c+ (5.14c) for women. The hardest boulder solved is at V17 (9A) for men and V16 (8C+) for women. The hardest redpoint of a multi-pitch (or big wall) route is at 9a+ (5.15a) for men and 8c (5.14b) for women. The hardest free solo of a single-pitch route is at 8c (5.14b) for men and 7a (5.11d) for women, and the hardest free solo of a multi-pitch (or big wall) route is at 7c+ (5.13a) for men and 7a (5.11d) for women.

== Single-pitch routes ==
=== Redpointed by men ===
9c (5.15d): (Note: Excluded from 9c: Alex Megos's Bibliographie (2020) is excluded post its 2021 downgrade by Stefano Ghisolfi (that Megos agreed with), and Sean Bailey's (2020) further confirmation that it is at 9b+ (it ranks as the fifth-ever 9b+ in history).)

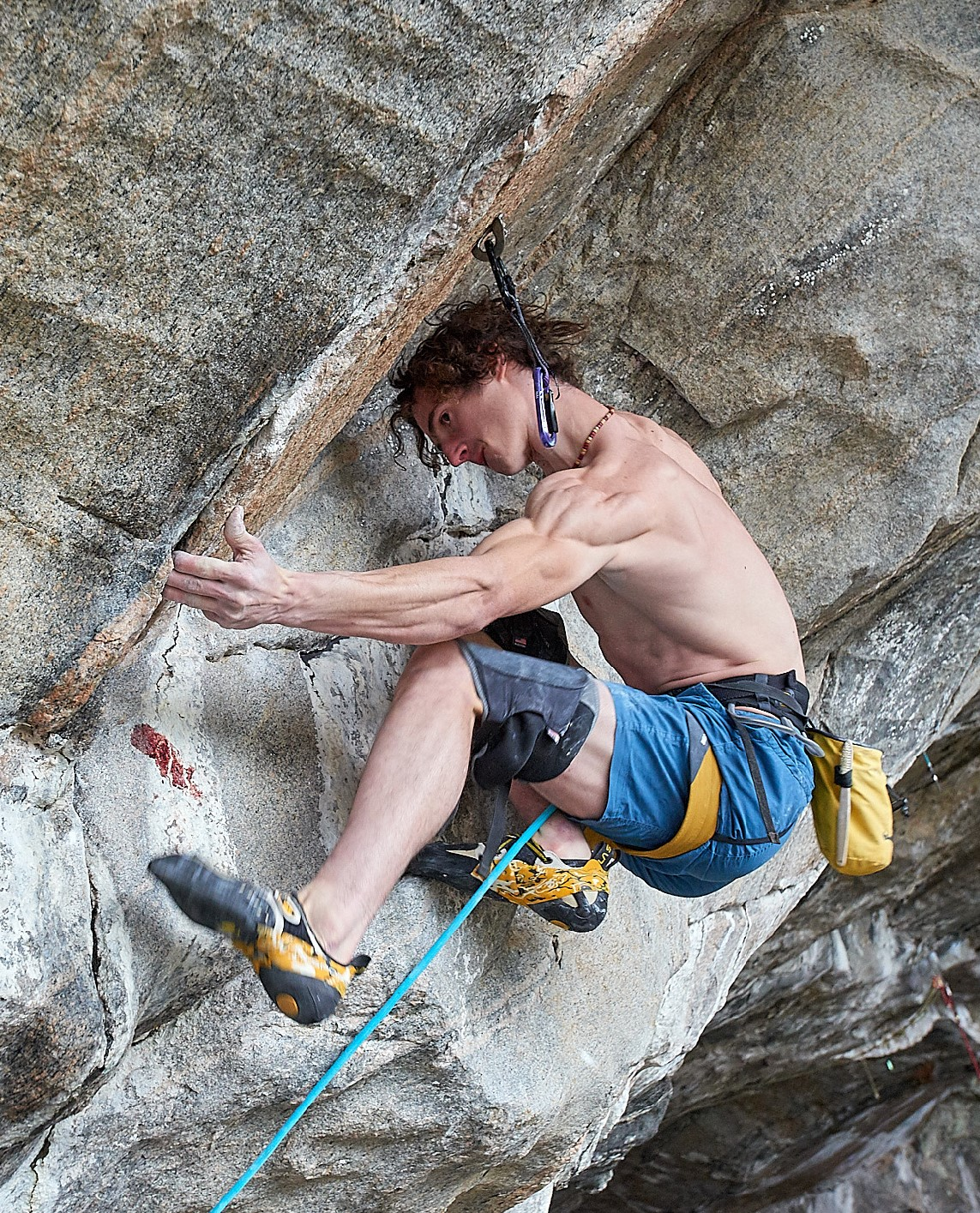
Adam Ondra on Silence

- Silence – Flatanger Municipality (NOR) – September 3, 2017 – First ascent by Adam Ondra, who described it as "much harder than anything else" he had previously done, and cautiously suggested the 9c rating for the 45 m route. Is unrepeated (November 2026).
- DNA – Verdon Gorge (FRA) – April 29, 2022 – First ascent by Sébastien Bouin. On October 10, 2026, it became the first-ever 9c to be repeated when it was ascended by Jakob Schubert who confirmed the grade and felt it was harder than B.I.G.
- B.I.G (also Project Big) – Flatanger Municipality (NOR) – September 20, 2023 – First ascent by Jakob Schubert who worked it with Adam Ondra and after consulting with him, proposed 9c saying it was "definitely harder" than Perfecto Mundo a "benchmark" 9b+ route. Is unrepeated (November 2026).
- Duality of Man – Dry Canyon, Arizona (USA) – March 6, 2025 – First ascent by Sean Bailey who worked on the project for several years, and is the first-ever proposed 9c in North America. It is unrepeated (November 2026).

9b+ (5.15c): (Note: Excluded from 9b+: Bernabè Fernandez's Chilam Balam (2003), was an unconfirmed and disputed first ascent that Fernandez proposed at 9b+ (5.15c) (the world's first-ever 9b+), which Adam Ondra regraded to a "low end" 5.15b (9b) in 2008, and which was further downgraded by later repeaters to a consensus of "hard 9a+ or 9a+/b".)

- Change – Flatanger Municipality (NOR) – October 4, 2012 – First-ever 9b+ in history, by Adam Ondra; grade confirmed by Stefano Ghisolfi (2020). Third ascent was by Seb Bouin (2022), who felt a kneebar made it closer to 9b/9b+ (5.15b/c); fourth was by Alex Megos (2024).
- La Dura Dura – Oliana (ESP) – February 7, 2013 – Second-ever 9b+, by Adam Ondra; first-ever 9b+ repeat by Chris Sharma (March 23, 2013).
- Vasil Vasil – Moravský Kras (CZE) – December 4, 2013 – Third-ever 9b+, by Adam Ondra. Remains unrepeated (January 2025).
- Perfecto Mundo – Margalef (ESP) – May 9, 2018 – Fourth 9b+, by Alexander Megos; repeat by Stefano Ghisolfi (2018), and Jakob Schubert (2019); considered a "benchmark" 9b+ route.

9b (5.15b): (Note: Excluded from 9b: Dani Andrada's Ali Hulk Sit Start Extension (2007) is excluded post its 2021 downgrade to 9a+/b by Alex Garriga, and further downgraded to 9a by Dani Moreno in 2023.) (Note: Excluded from 9b: Dani Andrada's Delincuente Natural (2008) is excluded post its 2021 downgrade to 9a by Jonathan Flor, who made the first repeat.) (Note: Excluded from 9b: Fred Rouhling's Akira (1995) is excluded post its 2020 downgrade to 9a by Seb Bouin and Lucien Martinez.) (Note: Not included in 9b: Tommy Caldwell's Flex Luthor (2003) is not included as Matty Hong's 2021 upgrade to 9b included the breaking of over a dozen handholds and twenty footholds, so much so that Hong could not opine on whether it was the same route Caldwell climbed, and Caldwell himself intervened to say that it was not as hard as Jumbo Love. In November 2022, Jonathan Siegrist made the fourth ascent and downgraded it to 9a+ (5.15a))

- Jumbo Love – Clark Mountain (US) – September 11, 2008 – First-ever 9b (5.15b) in history, by Chris Sharma. Repeated by Ethan Pringle (2015), Jonathan Siegrist (2018), and Seb Bouin (2022).
- Golpe de Estado – Siurana (ESP) – December 17, 2008 – Second-ever 9b (5.15b), by Chris Sharma. First-ever 9b repeat by Adam Ondra (2010) (was Ondra's first 9b).
- Neanderthal – Santa Linya (ESP) – December 18, 2009 – Third-ever 9b (5.15b), by Chris Sharma. Repeated by Jakob Schubert (2018), and Adam Ondra (2019).

9a+ (5.15a): (Note: Excluded from 9a+: Alexander Huber's Weiße Rose (1994) was graded 8c+ but Adam Ondra's 2008 repeat estimated it at 9a (and potentially 9a+, which would have made it the world first-ever 9a+), however, Jakob Schubert's 2020 repeat confirmed it 9a.) (Note: Excluded from 9a+: Bernabè Fernandez's Orujo (1998), was an unconfirmed and disputed ascent that Fernandez proposed at 9a+ (5.15a) (the world's first-ever 9a+ at the time), which has not been repeated due to concerns over manufacturing of holds.)

- Open Air – Schleier Waterfall (AUT) – 1996 – First ascent by Alexander Huber, who proposed 9a (5.14d); it has only been repeated once in 2008 by Adam Ondra who felt it was 9a+ (5.15a), but the breaking of holds means it is uncertain whether Ondra did the same route.
- Mutation – Raven Tor, Peak District (ENG) – 1998 – First ascent by Steve McClure, who graded it 9a (5.14d). Will Bosi completed the first repeat in October 2021 and suggested the route is 9a+ (5.15a), or even harder.
- Realization – Céüse (FRA) – July 2001 – First ascent by Chris Sharma. First consensus 9a+ (5.15a) in history.
- La Rambla – Siurana (ESP) – March 2003 – First ascent by Ramón Julián Puigblanqué. Second consensus 9a+ (5.15a) in history.

9a (5.14d):

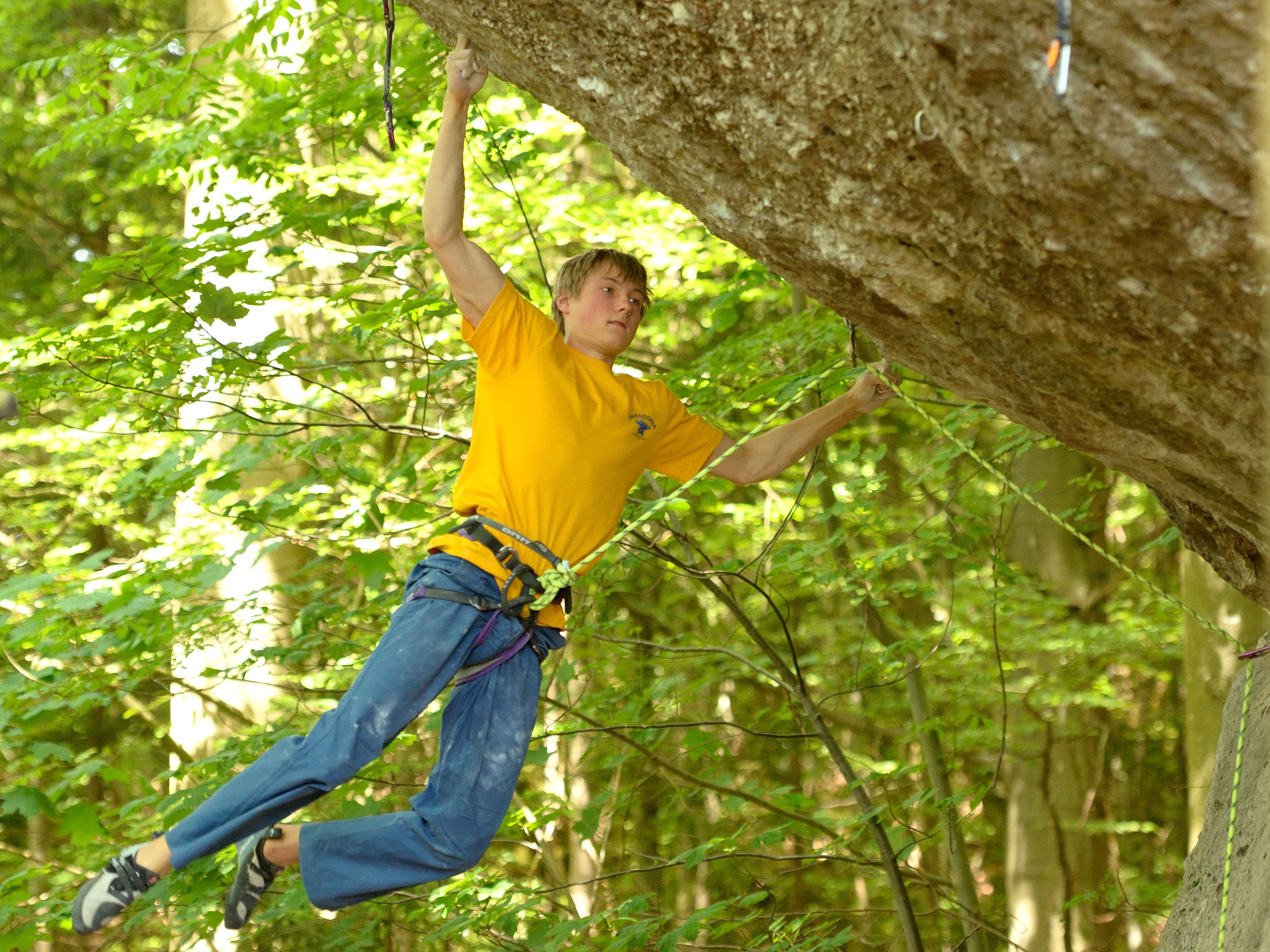
Alex Megos on Action Directe

- Action Directe – Frankenjura (DEU) – 1991 – First-ever consensus 9a in history, by Wolfgang Güllich, who originally graded it 8c+, but now the "benchmark" for 9a.
- Om – Endstal, Berchtesgaden (DEU) – 1992 – Second-ever 9a, by Alexander Huber.
- Bain de Sang – Saint Loup (SUI) – 1993 – Third-ever 9a, by Fred Nicole.
- Hugh – Les Eaux-Claires (FRA) – 1993 – Fourth-ever 9a, by Fred Rouhling.

8c+ (5.14c):

- Liquid Ambar – Pen Trwyn, (WAL) – May 1990 – First ascent by Jerry Moffatt who graded 8c (5.14b), but subsequent repeats have regraded it to 8c+.
- Hubble – Raven Tor, Peak District (ENG) – June 1990 – Considered first-ever consensus 8c+ (5.14c) in history, by Ben Moon; later considered a possible first 8c+/9a, or even the first-ever 9a.
- Just Do It – Smith Rock (US) – 1992 – Considered second-ever consensus 8c+ (5.14c) (after Hubble), by Jean-Baptiste Tribout.
- Super Plafond – Volx, (FRA) – 1994 – Considered third-ever consensus 8c+ (5.14c), by Jean-Baptiste Tribout.

8c (5.14b): (Note: Not included in 8c:Jerry Moffatt's Stone Love (1988), is listed in some climbing databases as the world's second-ever 8c, however, its consensus grade is considered at 8b+.)

- Wallstreet – Frankenjura (DEU) – 1987 – First-ever consensus 8c (5.14b) in history, by Wolfgang Güllich.
- Anaïs et le canabis – Saint Loup (SUI) – 1988 – Second-ever consensus 8c (5.14b), by Fred Nicole.
- Agincourt – Buoux (FRA) – 1989 – Third-ever consensus 8c (5.14b), by Ben Moon.
- Maginot Line (Plafond) – Volx (FRA) – 1989 – Fourth-ever consensus 8c (5.14b), by Ben Moon.

8b+ (5.14a): (Note: Not included in 8b+: Wolfgang Güllich's Dead Line (1986) is listed in some climbing databases as the world's third-ever 8b+, however, its consensus grade is now closer to 8b.)

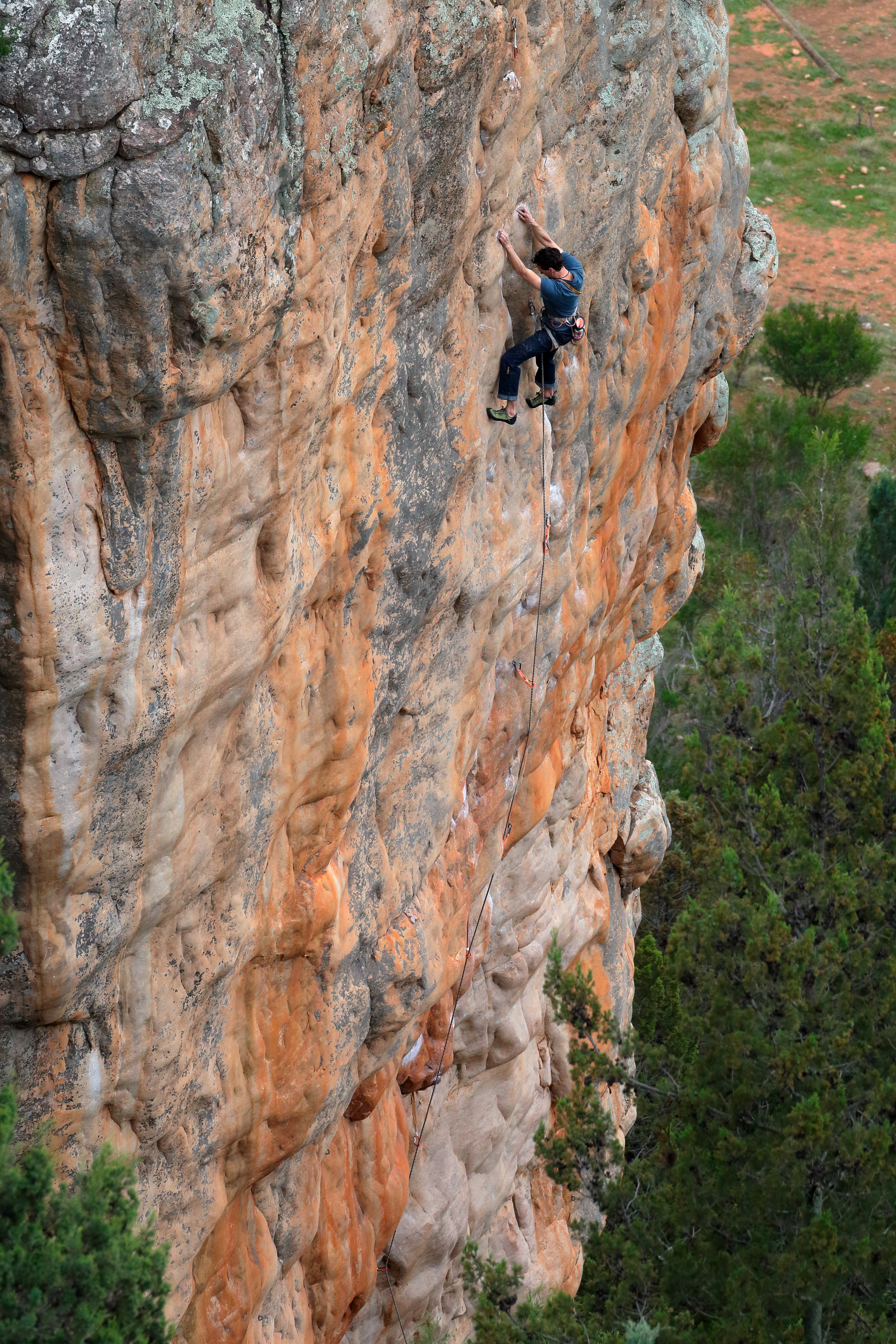
Climber nearing the top of Punks in the Gym 32 8b+ (5.14a)

- Punks in the Gym – Mount Arapiles (AUS) – 1985 – First-ever consensus 8b+ (5.14a) in history, by Wolfgang Güllich.
- La Rage de Vivre – Buoux (FRA) – 1986 – Second-ever consensus 8b+ (5.14a), by Antoine Le Menestrel.
- To Bolt or Not to Be – Smith Rock (US) – 1986 – Third-ever consensus 8b+ (5.14a), by Jean-Baptiste Tribout.
- Le Minimum – Buoux (FRA) – 1986 – Fourth-ever consensus 8b+ (5.14a), by Marc Le Menestrel.

8b (5.13d): (Note: Not included in 8b: Martin Scheel's Vuelo a Ciegas Direct (trans: Blind Fight) which was Spain's first 8b and sometimes mistaken as being climbed in 1984, whereas Scheel did the first ascent in 1986.)

- Kanal im Rücken – Frankenjura (DEU) – 1984 – First-ever consensus 8b (5.13d) in history, by Wolfgang Güllich.
- Les Mains Sales – Buoux (FRA) – 1985 – Second-ever consensus 8b (5.13d), by Marc Le Menestrel.
- Le fluide enchanté – Mouriès (FRA) – 1985 – Third-ever consensus 8b (5.13d), by Marc Le Menestrel.
- La Rose et le Vampire – Buoux (FRA) – 1985 – Fourth-ever consensus 8b (5.13d), by Antoine Le Menestrel.

8a+ (5.13c) (Note: Not included in 8a+: Dave Cuthbertson's traditional climb Requiem (1983) is listed in some climbing databases as the world's second-ever 8a+, however, its consensus grade is now closer to 8a (or E8 6b in the English traditional grading system).)

- The Face – Altmühltal (DEU) – 1983 – First-ever consensus 8a+ (5.13c) in history, by Jerry Moffatt.
- Le Bidule – Le Saussois (FRA) – 1984 – Second-ever consensus 8a+ (5.13c), by Marc Le Menestrel.

==== Pre-sport era ====
The notable first ascents to propose a new highest-grade prior to The Face were traditional climbing routes:

8a (5.13b) (Note: Not included in 8a: Peter Cleveland's Phlogiston (1977) at Devil's Lake is sometimes proposed as a first 8a (5.13b), but it was clarified as a top rope.)

- Grand Illusion – Sugar Loaf, Lake Tahoe, CA (US) – 1979 – First-ever consensus 8a (5.13b) in history, by Tony Yaniro.
- Cosmic Debris – Yosemite Valley, CA (US) – May, 1980 – Early 8a led by Bill Price.
- Sphinx Crack – South Platte, CO (US) – April, 1981 – Early 8a led by Steve Hong.
- 13 Boulevard du Vol – Rochers de Freyr, (BEL) – 1981 – Early consensus 8a (5.13b), by Arnould t'Kint.

7c+ (5.13a)

- The Phoenix – Yosemite, CA (US) – 1977 – Considered the first-ever consensus 7c+ (5.13a) in history, by Ray Jardine (used his new cams).
- Le Toit – Baou de Quatre Ouro (FRA) – 1981 – Second-ever consensus 7c+ (5.13a) in history, by Patrick Edlinger.
- Le Haine – La Turbie (FRA) – March, 1981 – Third-ever consensus 7c+ (5.13a) in history, by Patrick Berhault.
- Chimpanzodrome – Le Saussois (FRA) – April, 1981 – Fourth-ever consensus 7c+ (5.13a) in history, by Jean-Pierre Bouvier.

7c (5.12d)

- Psycho Roof – Eldorado, CO (US) – 1975 – Estimated as the first-ever 7c (5.12d) in history, by Steve Wunsch; only one ascent, due to large broken flake, and was possibly harder than 7c in 1975.
- The Pirate – Suicide Rock, CA – (US) – 1978 – Early 7c (5.12d) by Tony Yaniro.
- Iron Cross – Shawangunks, NY – (US) – 1978 – Early 7c (5.12d) by John Bragg.
- Nymphodalle – Les Calanques (FRA) – 1979 – Sometimes considered first-ever consensus 7c (5.12d) in history, by Patrick Edlinger.

7b+ (5.12c)

- Paisano Overhang – Suicide Rock, (US) – 1974 – First-ever consensus 7b+ (5.12c) climbs, by John Long.
- Super Crack – Shawangunks, (US) – 1974 Oct – Long considered the first-ever consensus 7b+ (5.12c), by Steve Wunsch.
- Hangdog Flyer – Royal Arches Yosemite NP – (US) – 1976 Sept – Early 7b+, by Ray Jardine and John Lakey.
- Super Crack – Shawangunks, (US) – 1977 – First-ever repeat of a consensus 7b+ (5.12c), by Ron Kauk.

7b (5.12b)

- Kansas City – Shawangunks, NY (US) – 1973 – One of the first-ever 5.12b/c climbs in history, by John Bragg.
- Fish Crack – Yosemite (US) – 1975 May – One of the first-ever 7b (5.12b) climbs in history, by Henry Barber.
- Hotline (Pitch two) – Worst Error Yosemite (US) – 1975 – Early consensus 5.12b pitch, FFA by Ron Kauk and John Bachar.

7a+ (5.12a)

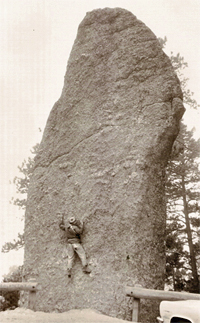
Thimble, the 1960s

- Thimble – Needles, SD, (US) – 1961 – First-ever 7a+ (5.12a), free soloed by John Gill.
- Macabre Roof – Ogden, Utah, (US) – 1967 – First-ever roped 7a+ (5.12a) in history, flashed by Greg Lowe.
- English Hanging Gardens – Big Rock, Lake Perris CA (US) – 1970 – Likely third-ever 7a+, by John Gosling.
- Constable's Overhang – Wilton, (ENG) – 1973 – Early 7a+ (5.12a) as is graded E5 6b, by Hank Pasquill.
- The Throne – Shawangunks, NY (US) – 1973 – Early 7a+ (5.12a) lead, by John Stannard.

7a (5.11d)

- Foops – Shawangunks, NY (US) – 1967 October – Often considered a first-ever consensus 7a (5.11d), by John Stannard.
- Our Father – Stoney Middleton (ENG) – June 1968 – Early 7a lead (E4 6b), by Tom Proctor.
- Messner Slab – Pilastro di Mezzo, Sas dla Crusc/Heiligkreuzkofel, (ITA) – 1968 July – Now considered very early 7a (5.11d), onsight by Reinhold Messner.
- Schwager Nordwand – Schrammsteine, Saxon Switzerland, (DEU) – 1970 – Notable early 7a (5.11d) IXb, by Bernd Arnold.

6c+ (5.11b/c)

- Wall of Horrors – Almscliff (UK) – June 28, 1961 – Very early E3 6a (5.11b), free soloed by Allan Austin.
- Königshängel – Friensteine, Saxon Switzerland, (DEU) – August 12, 1965 – Early 6c+ (5.11b/c) Saxon IXa, by Fritz Eske.
- Crack of Doom – City of Rocks ID (US) – 1965 – Early 5.11c led by Greg Lowe.

6c (5.11a/b):

- Demon Rib – Black Rocks (ENG) – May 13, 1949 – Sometimes considered the first-ever 6c (E3 5c), by Peter Harding.
- Schwager Talweg – Schrammsteine, Saxon Switzerland (DEU) – August 31, 1952 – Even with shoulder stands at all three cruxes, 6c (Saxon VIIIc) free climbing was led by Harry Rost.
- Nordwand – Rohnspitze Affensteine, Saxon Switzerland (DEU) – Sept 14, 1956 – Second Saxon VIIIc using one shoulder stand, (IXa All Free today), led by Wulf Scheffler.
- Goliath – Burbage South Edge, (ENG) – 1958 – Very early 6c (5.11a/b), harder today at E4 6a, onsight, by Don Whillans.

6b+ (5.10d/11a):

- Suicide Wall, Route 1 – Idwal Slabs (WAL) – 1945 – One of the first-ever 6b+ (E2 5c), by Chris Preston.
- Rebitsch-Spiegl (Pitch Two) – Fleischbank Wilder Kaiser (AUT) – June 20, 1946 – Early 6b+ (UIAA VII) lead by Mathias Rebitsch.
- Right Eliminate – Curbar Edge (ENG) – 1951 – Early 6b+ (E3 5c) onsight, by Joe Brown.

6b (5.10c):

- Rostkante – Hauptwiesenstein Bielatel, Saxon Switzerland (DEU) –1922 – First consensus 6b (Saxon VIIIb, UIAA VII), by Hans Rost.
- Gemeinschaftsweg – Wilder Zinne Saxon Switzerland (DEU) – 1938 – Early 6b by Richard Dressler.
- Dolch – Rohnspitze Affensteine Saxon Switzerland (DEU) – June 5 1947 – Early Saxon VIIIb (UIAA VII), by Karl-Heinz Gonda.

6a+ (5.10b):

- Westkante – Wilderkopf Affensteine, Saxon Switzerland (DEU) – 1918 – First-ever 6a+ (Saxon VIIIa) by Emanuel Strubich.
- Wall End Slab Direct – Stanage Plantation (ENG) – 1930 – E2 5b lead, by Frank Elliott.

6a (5.10a):

- Südriss – Kreuzturm Affensteine, Saxon Switzerland (DEU) – 1910 – First-ever 6a (Sax VIIc) by Max Matthäus.

5b (5.8):

- Perrykante – Spannagelturm, Bielatel, Saxon Switzerland (DEU) – June 1, 1906 – Often considered the first-ever 5b, even with two shoulder stands (Saxon VIIb then, harder if redpointed), by Oliver Perry Smith.
- Alter Weg – Teufelsturm Schmilka Saxon Switzerland (DEU) – Sept 1, 1906 – Likely the second-ever 5b, utilizing one shoulder stand at Saxon VIIb, harder if done all free, by Oliver Perry Smith.

=== Redpointed by women ===
9b+ (5.15c)

- Excalibur – Arco, Trentino (ITA) – April 5, 2025 – First-ever female ascent of a 9b+ route, by Brooke Raboutou.
- Bibliographie – Céüse (FRA) – June 6, 2026 – Second-ever female ascent of a 9b+ route, by Janja Garnbret.
- Bibliographie – Céüse (FRA) – August 16, 2026 – Third-ever female ascent of a 9b+ route, by Laura Rogora.

9b (5.15b): (Note: Excluded from 9b: Laura Rogora's 2020 ascent of Dani Andrada's Ali Hulk Sit Start Extension (2007), is excluded post its 2021 downgrade from 9b to 9a+/b by Alex Garriga.)

- La Planta de Shiva – Villanueva del Rosario (ESP) – October 22, 2017 – First-ever female ascent of a 9b route, by Angela Eiter. Repeated by Anak Verhoeven in 2024, making her only the fourth-ever female to redpoint a 9b route.
- Eagle–4 – Saint-Léger-du-Ventoux (FRA) – November 7, 2020 – Second-ever female ascent of a 9b, by Julia Chanourdie.
- Madame Ching – Tyrol (AUT) – December 16, 2020 – Third female 9b and first-ever female FFA of a 9b, by Angela Eiter, (unrepeated).
- Erebor – Eremo di San Paolo, Arco (ITA) – October 2, 2021 – Fourth-ever female ascent of a 9b (downgraded from 9b+), by Laura Rogora.

9a+ (5.15a):

- La Rambla – Siurana (ESP) – February 26, 2017 – First-ever female ascent of a 9a+ route, by Margo Hayes.
- Sweet neuf – Pierrot Beach (FRA) – September 11, 2017 – Second-ever female ascent, and first-ever female FFA of a 9a+, by Anak Verhoeven. Confirmed by Cédric Lachat (2019).
- Realization – Céüse (FRA) – September 24, 2017 – Third-ever female ascent of a 9a+ route, by Margo Hayes.
- Papichulo – Oliana (ESP) – March 22, 2019 – Fourth-ever female ascent of a 9a+ route, by Margo Hayes.

9a/9a+ :

- Bimbaluna – Saint Loup (SUI) – 1 May 2005 – World's first-ever female ascent of a 9a/9a+ route, by Josune Bereziartu.
- Open your Mind direct – Santa Linya (ESP) 17 March 2015 – Second female ascent of a 9a/9a+ route, by Ashima Shiraishi.

9a (5.14d): (Note: Excluded from 9a: Sasha Digiulian's 2012 ascent of Era Vella, which was at the time considered the fourth-ever female ascent of a 9a. Era Vella has since been downgraded to 8c+/9a in the main climbing databases.) (Note: Not included in 9a: Alizée Dufraisse's 2012 ascent of La Reina Mora, which is sometimes considered as being 9a (thus the fourth-ever female 9a), but the climbing databases regard La Reina Mora as 8c+/9a.)

- Bain de Sang – Saint Loup (SUI) – October 29, 2002 – First-ever female ascent of a 9a route, by Josune Bereziartu.
- Logical Progression – Jo Yama (JPN) – November, 2004 – Second-ever female ascent of a 9a route, by Josune Bereziartu.
- Les 3 P – La grotte du Galetas, Verdon Gorge (FRA) – August, 2011 – Third-ever female ascent of a 9a route, by Charlotte Durif.
- PuntX – Gorges du Loup, (FRA) – November, 2013 – Fourth-ever female ascent of a 9a route, by Muriel Sarkany.

8c+ (5.14c):

- Honky Tonk Mix – Onate (ESP) – June, 2000 – First-ever female ascent of an 8c+ route, by Josune Bereziartu.
- Noia – Andonno (ITA) – October, 2001 – Second-ever female ascent of an 8c+ route, by Josune Bereziartu.
- Na Nai – Baltzola (ESP) – June 18, 2003 – Third-ever female ascent of an 8c+ route, by Josune Bereziartu.
- Powerade – Vadiello (ESP) – May 21, 2007 – Fourth-ever female ascent of an 8c+ route, by Josune Bereziartu.

8c (5.14b):

- Honky Tonky – Onate (ESP) – May, 1998 – First-ever female ascent of an 8c route, by Josune Bereziartu.
- White Zombie – Baltzola (ESP) – May, 1999 – Second-ever female ascent of an 8c route, by Josune Bereziartu.
- Raz – Baltzola (ESP) – May, 1999 – Third-ever female ascent of an 8c route, by Josune Bereziartu.
- Welcome to Tijuana – Rodellar (ESP) – May, 2000 – Fourth-ever female ascent of an 8c route, by Josune Bereziartu.

8b+ (5.14a):

- Masse Critique – Cimai (FRA) – 1990 – First-ever female ascent of an 8b+ route, by Lynn Hill.
- No Sika, No Crime – Lehn (CHF) – 1993 – Second-ever female ascent of an 8b route, by Suzi Good.
- Silence Vertical – Troubat (FRA) – 1993 – Third-ever female ascent of an 8b route, by Robyn Erbesfield.
- Attention on vous regarde – Saint-Antonin-Noble-Val (FRA) – 1993 – Fourth-ever female ascent of an 8b route, by Robyn Erbesfield.

8b (5.13d):

- Sortilèges – Le Cimai (FRA) – 1988 – First-ever female ascent of an 8b route, by Isabelle Patissier.
- Sortilèges – Le Cimai (FRA) – 1989 – Second-ever female ascent of an 8b route, by Lynn Hill.
- Sortilèges – Le Cimai (FRA) – 1989 – Third-ever female ascent of an 8b route, by Corinne Labrune.

8a+ (5.13c):

- Choucas – Buoux (FRA) – March 1988 – First-ever female ascent of an 8a+ route, by Catherine Destivelle.

8a (5.13b):

- Come Back – Val San Nicolò (ITA) – 1986 – First-ever female ascent of an 8a route, by Luisa Iovane.
- Rêve de Papillon – Buoux (FRA) – 1987 – Second-ever female ascent of an 8a route, by Christine Gambert.
- Rêve de Papillon – Buoux (FRA) – 1987 – Third-ever female ascent of an 8a route, by Lynn Hill.
- Rêve de Papillon – Buoux (FRA) – 1988 – Fourth-ever female ascent of an 8a route, by Catherine Destivelle.

7c+/8a (5.13a/b) :

- Fleur de Rocaille – Mouriès, (FRA) – 1985 – First-ever female ascent of an 7c+/8a route, by Catherine Destivelle (grade softened from 8a).

==== Pre-sport era ====
The notable first female ascents that set a new highest-grade pre Fleur de Rocaille were traditional climbing routes:

7c+ (5.13a):

- Vandals – Shawangunk Mountains (US) – 1984 – First-ever female ascent of a 7c+ route, by Lynn Hill.
- Artificial Intelligence – Shawangunk Mountains (US) – 1985 – Second-ever female ascent of a 7c+ route, by Lynn Hill.
- Chimpanzodrome – Le Saussois (FRA) – 1985 – Third-ever female ascent of a 7c+ route, by Christine Gambert.

7c (5.12d):

- Ophir Broke – Telluride (US) – 1979 – First free ascent and first-ever female lead of a 7c route (subsequently upgraded), by Lynn Hill.
- Organic Iron – Shawangunk Mountains (US) – 1984 – Second-ever female ascent of a 7c route (was considered first), by Lynn Hill.
- Katapult – Frankenjura (GER) – 1985 – Third-ever female ascent of a 7c route, by Isabelle Patissier.

7b+ (5.12c):

- Super Crack – Shawangunk Mountains (US) – 1983 July – Early female ascent of a 7b+ route, by Barbara Devine.
- Yellow Crack Variation – Shawangunk Mountains (US) – 1984 – Early female ascent of a 7b+ route, by Lynn Hill.
- Pichenibule (en libre) – Verdon Gorge (FRA) – 1985 – First free ascent and early female lead of a 7b+ route, by Catherine Destivelle.

7b (5.12b):

- Kansas City – Shawangunk Mountains (US) – 1977 – Early female ascent of a 7b route, by Barbara Devine.
- Tales of Power – Yosemite Valley CA (US) – 1981 – Redpoint of a 7b route by Louise Shepherd

7a (5.11d):

- Foops – Shawangunk Mountains (US) – 1976 – Early female ascent of a 7a route, by Barbara Devine.:

6c (5.11a/b):

- Wide Country (Pitch One) – Eldorado Canyon CO (US) – 1973 June – Early female lead of a 6c pitch by Diana Hunter.

=== Onsighted / Flashed by men ===
With route beta on the internet, the distinction between an onsight (no prior beta) and a flash (had prior beta) is less relevant; it is recorded where noted.

9a+ (5.15a):

- Super Crackinette – Saint Léger (FRA) – 10 February 2018 – First-ever 9a+ flash (not onsight) in history, by Adam Ondra.

9a (5.14d):

- Southern Smoke Direct – Red River Gorge (USA) – 29 October 2012 – First-ever 9a flash (not onsight), by Adam Ondra.
- Estado Critico – Siurana (ESP) – 24 March 2013 – First-ever 9a onsight, by Alex Megos.
- Cabane au Canada – Rawyl (SUI) – 9 July 2013 – Second-ever 9a onsight, by Adam Ondra.
- Il Domani – Baltzola (ESP) – 3 May 2014 – Third-ever 9a onsight, by Adam Ondra.

8c+ (5.14c):

- Bizi Euskaraz – Etxauri (ESP) – December 11, 2007 – First-ever 8c+ onsight, by Patxi Usobiaga.
- Kidetasunaren Balio Erantsia – Etxauri (ESP) – March 6, 2011 – Second-ever 8c+ onsight, by Adam Ondra.
- Bizi Euskaraz – Etxauri (ESP) – March 7, 2011 – Third-ever 8c+ onsight, by Adam Ondra.
- Powerade – Vadiello (La Caverna) (ESP) – March 9, 2011 – Fourth-ever 8c+ onsight, by Adam Ondra.

8c (5.14b):

- White Zombie – Baltzola (ESP) – October 6, 2004 – First-ever 8c onsight, by Yuji Hirayama.
- Pata Negra – Rodellar (ESP) – August 10, 2005 – Second-ever 8c onsight, by Tomáš Mrázek.
- Gaua – Lezaia (ESP) – October 10, 2005 – Third-ever 8c onsight, by Patxi Usobiaga.
- La Teoria Dell'8a – Grotta dell'Aeronauta (ITA) – November 23, 2005 – Fourth-ever 8c onsight, by Tomáš Mrázek.

8b+ (5.14a):

- Massey Fergusson – Calanques (FRA) – 1995 – First-ever 8b+ onsight, by Elie Chevieux.
- Maldita María – Cuenca (ESP) – 1996 – Second-ever 8b+ onsight, by Elie Chevieux.

8b (5.13d):

- Liaisons Dangereuses – Les Calanques (Les Goudes), (FRA) – 1993 – First-ever 8b onsight, by Elie Chevieux
- Public Enemy – Cuenca, (ESP) – 1993 – Originally considered the first 8a+/8b onsight, by Stefan Glowacz, but consensus grade is now 8b.

8a+ (5.13c):

(unknown)

8a (5.13b):

- Samizdat – Cimai (FRA) – 1987 – First-ever 8a on-sight, by Antoine Le Menestrel.

7c+ (5.13a):

- Pol Pot – Verdon Gorge (FRA) – 1984 – First-ever 7c+ onsight, by Jerry Moffatt.
- The Phoenix – Yosemite (FRA) – 1984 – Second-ever 7c+ onsight, by Jerry Moffatt.
- Yesterday Direct – Mount Arapiles (AUS) – 1985 – Third-ever 7c+ (Australia 28) onsight, by Wolfgang Güllich.

7c (5.12d):

- Equinox – Joshua Tree (US) – 1982 – First-ever 7c flash (not onsight), by Jerry Moffatt (originally considered 7b+).
- La Polka des Ringards – Buoux (FRA) – 1982 – First-ever 7c onsight, by Patrick Edlinger.
- Heisse Finger – Frankenjura (GER) – 1983 – Second-ever 7c onsight, by Jerry Moffatt.
- Chasin' the Trane – Frankenjura (GER) – 1983 – Third-ever 7c onsight, by Jerry Moffatt.

7b+ (5.12c):

- Super Crack – Shawangunks (US) – 1982 – First-ever 7b+ flash (not onsight), by Jerry Moffatt.
- Captain Crochet – Buoux (FRA) – 1982 – First-ever 7b+ onsight, by Patrick Edlinger.

7a+ (5.12a):

- Thimble – Black Hills SD (US) – 1961 – First ascent and first-ever flash at 5.12a, free soloed by John Gill.
- Macabre Roof – Ogden UT (US) – 1967 – FFA and first onsight at 5.12a, by Greg Lowe.

7a (5.11d):

- Messner Slab – Pilastro di Mezzo Sas dla Crusc Dolomites (ITA) – July 1968 – First ascent and first-ever onsight at 7a, by Reinhold Messner.
- Nordwand – Schwager Schrammsteine Saxon Switzerland (DEU) – June 30 1970 – First ascent and onsight at Sax IXb, by Bernd Arnold.

6c+ (5.11b/c):

- Crack of Doom – City of Rocks ID (US) – Spring 1965 – FFA and first-ever flash at 5.11c, by Greg Lowe.
- Son of Great Chimney – Devils Lake SP WI (US) – 1968 – First ascent and onsight lead at 5.11c, by Pete Cleveland.

6c (5.11a/b):

- Talweg – Schwager Schrammsteine Saxon Switzerland (DEU) – 1952 – First ascent and first onsight of one of the cruxes at Sax VIIIc, by Harry Rost.

6b+ (5.10d/11a):

- Right Eliminate – Curbar Edge (ENG) – 1951 – First ascent and first-ever onsight at E3 5c (5.11a), by Joe Brown.
- Goliath – Burbage South (ENG) – 1958 – First ascent and onsight lead at E4 5c (5.11a then, a bit harder today due to broken holds), by Don Whillans.

6b (5.10c):

- Rostkante – Hauptwiesenstein Bielatel Saxon Switzerland (DEU) – 1922 – First ascent and first-ever on sight at 6b (Sax VIIIb), by Hans Rost.

6a+ (5.10b):

- Westkante – Wilderkopf Affensteine Saxon Switzerland (DEU) – 1918 – First ascent and first-ever on sight at 6a+ (Sax VIIIa), by Emanuel Strubich.
- Kuniskante – Rauschentorwächter Schmilka Saxon Switzerland (DEU) – 1921 – First ascent and on sight lead at Sax VIIIa/VIIIb, by Oswald Kunis.

=== Onsighted / Flashed by women ===
With route beta on the internet, the distinction between an onsight (no prior beta) and a flash (had prior beta) is less relevant; it is recorded where noted.

8c+ (5.14c):

- Ultimate Sacrifice – Gorges du Loup (FR) – July 28, 2025 – First-ever female 8c+ onsight, by Laura Rogora
- Puro Dreaming – Arco, Trentino (ITA) – October 24, 2025 – Second-ever female 8c+ flash/onsight, by Janja Garnbret; the original grade was 9a (5.14d) but was softened due to use of kneepads, which Garnbret did not use on her ascent, making it a possible first flash at 9a.

8c (5.14b): (Note: Excluded from 8c:Kajsa Rosén's onsight of T-1 Full Equip in March 2016 was considered a possible first female 8c onsght, but the consensus grade was settled at 8b+ in 2021.)

- La Fabelita -– Santa Linya (ESP) – December 31, 2015 – First-ever female 8c flash, by Janja Garnbret (flash of Rollito Sharma downgraded).
- Fish eye – Oliana (ESP) – November 1, 2021 – First-ever female 8c onsight, by Janja Garnbret
- American Hustle – Oliana (ESP) – November 4, 2021 – Second-ever female 8c onsight, by Janja Garnbret
- L'Antagonista – Montsant (ESP) – November 25, 2022 – Third-ever female (and the second female) 8c onsight, by Chaehyun Seo.

8b+ (5.14a): (Note: Not included in 8b+: Katie Brown's onsight of Omaha Beach in 1999 is sometimes mistakenly classed as an 8b+ onsight, however, several holds had broken from the sandstone route since Brown's onsight, and the original route was not considered an 8b+ (5.14a)-graded route.) (Note: Not included in 8b+:Charlotte Durif lists a number of 8b+ onsights in her personal database: Spider cochon (2008), Ultime démence (2009), Basse température (2009) and Snails paradise (July 2010), that would rank as the earliest 8b+ female onsights, however, they have not been verified in climbing media (unlike Les Rois du Pétrole in 2010).)

- Hidrofobia – Montsant (ESP) – April, 2006 – First-ever female 8b+ onsight, by Josune Bereziartu (later considered possible 8b).
- Humildes pa casa – Oliana (ESP) – April, 2010 – Second-ever female 8b+ onsight, by Maja Vidmar.
- Les Rois du Pétrole – Pic Saint-Loup (FRA) – July, 2010 – Third-ever female 8b+ onsight, by Charlotte Durif (was 8c).
- Omaha Beach – Red River Gorge (US) – March, 2011 – Fourth-ever female 8b+ onsight, by Sasha Digiulian.

8b (5.13d):

- Steroid Performance – Horai (JPN) – December, 2004 – First-ever female 8b onsight, by Josune Bereziartu.
- Il Veccho et il Mare – Millennium Cave, Sardinia (ITA) – July, 2005 – Second-ever female 8b onsight, by Caroline Ciavaldini.
- La Réserve – Saint-Léger-du-Ventoux, (FRA) – October, 2005 – Third-ever female 8b onsight, by Josune Bereziartu.
- Fuente de Energia – La Caverna, Vadiello (ESP) – November, 2005 – Fourth-ever female 8b onsight, by Josune Bereziartu.

8a+ (5.13c):

- Bon Vintage – Terradets (ESP) – April, 2000 – First-ever female 8a+ onsight, by Josune Bereziartu.
- Naska – Apellániz (ESP) – October, 2001 – Second-ever female 8a+ onsight, by Josune Bereziartu.
- Déversé Satanique – Gorges du Loup (FRA) – October, 2001 – Third-ever female 8a+ onsight, by Josune Bereziartu.

8a (5.13b):

- Overdose – Lourmarin (FRA) – 1993 – First-ever female 8a/+ onsight, by Robyn Erbesfield.
- Simon – Frankenjura (GER) – 1992 – First-ever female 8a onsight, by Lynn Hill.
- Rampaneu – Frankenjura (GER) – 1992 – Second-ever female 8a onsight, by Robyn Erbesfield.

=== Free-solo by men ===
8c (5.14b):

- Panem et Circenses – Length: 15 metres (49 ft) – Arco (IT) – March 2021 – First-ever 8c free solo, by Alfredo Webber, aged 52.

8b+ (5.14a):

- Kommunist – Length: 22 metres (72 ft) – Tyrol (AUT) – 2004 – First-ever 8b+ free solo, by Alexander Huber.
- Darwin Dixit – Length: 15 metres (49 ft) – Margalef (ESP) – March 2008 – Originally 8c, but downgraded to 8b+, by Dave MacLeod.

8b (5.13d):

- Compilation – Omblèze (FRA) – 1993– First-ever 8b free solo, by Alain Robert.
- Der Opportunist – Schleierfall (AUT) – 2003 – Second-ever 8b free solo, by Alexander Huber.

8a+ (5.13c):

- Rêve de gosse – La Roche-des-Arnauds (FRA) – 1987 – First-ever 8a+ free solo, by Jean-Christophe Lafaille.
- La Nuit du Lézard – Length: 30-meters – Buoux (FRA) – 1991 – Early free solo at 8a+, by Alain Robert.
- Lou Pape – Length: 30-meters – Omblèze (FRA) – 1991 – Free solo at 8a+, by Alain Robert.
- Pour Une Poignée de Chamallow – Length: 25-meters – Cornas (FRA) – 1993 – Free solo at 8a+, by Alain Robert.

8a (5.13b):

- Revelations – Length: 15 meters – Raven Tor, Peak District (ENG) – 1985 – First-ever 8a free solo, by Antoine Le Menestrel.
- Orange Mécanique – Length: 30 meters – Cimai (FRA) – 1989 – Early 8a free solo, by Patrick Edlinger.
- Reve de Papillon – Length: 25-meters – Buoux (FRA) – 1990 – 8a free solo, by Alain Robert.

7c+ (5.13a):

- Chimpanzodrome – Length: 15 meters – Le Saussois (FRA) –1984 – First-ever 7c+ free solo, by Jean-Pierre Bouvier.
- Polpot – Length: 50 meters (2-pitches) – Barre de l'Escales Verdon Gorge (FRA) – 1996 – Early 7c+ free solo, by Alain Robert.

7c (5.12d)

- Bagatelle – Length: 16-meters – Devils Lake State Park WI (US) – 1983 – Free solo ascent at 7c, by Dan Goodwin.
- Weed Killer – Length: 8 meters – Raven Tor, Peak District (ENG) – 1986 – Early 7c free solo, by Wolfgang Güllich.

7b+ (5.12c):

- Supercrack – Length: 18-meters – Shawangunks NY (US) – 1985 – Free solo ascent at 7b+, by Russ Clune.

7b (5.12b)

- Mickey's Crack – Length: 18 meters – Mickey's Beach, San Francisco (US) – October 1981 – First-ever 7b free solo, by Dan Goodwin.
- Baby Apes – Length: 15 meters – Joshua Tree National Park (US) – 1982 – Second-ever 7b free solo, by John Bachar.

7a+ (5.12a)

- Thimble – Length: 9 meters – Needles, SD, (US) – 1961 – First ascent and first-ever 7a+ free solo, by John Gill.
- Leave It To Beaver – Length: 18-meters – Joshua Tree CA (US) –1980 – Free solo at 7a+, by John Yablonski.
- Linden – Length: 23-meters – Stanage Edge (ENG) – 1982 – Onsight free solo at E6 6b, by Phil Davidson.
- Courage Fuyons – Length: 35-meters – Buoux (FRA) – 1990 – Onsight free solo at 7a+, by Alain Robert.

7a (5.11d):

- Spider Line – Length: 16 meters – Joshua Tree, CA, (US) – February 1978 – First lead and first-ever free solo at 7a, by John Yablonski.
- Self Contrôle – Length: 35-meters – Verdon Gorge (FRA) – 1991 – Onsight free solo at 7a, by Alain Robert.

6c+ (5.11b/c):

- Wall of Horrors – Length: 18 meters – Almscliff, (ENG) – 1961 – First-ever free solo at E3 6a (5.11b), by Allan Austin.
- Slip N Slide – Length: 8 meters – Peak District, (ENG) – 1976 – First-ever free solo at E6 6a, by Ron Fawcett.

6c (5.11a/b):

- Western Front – Length: 13 meters – Almscliff (ENG) – July 9, 1958 – One of the first-ever free solos at E3 5c, unrehearsed, by Allan Austin.

6b+ (5.10d/11a):

- Sentinel Crack – Length: 17 meters – Chatsworth Edge Derbyshire (UK) – 1959 – New route and free solo at 5.10d (E3 5c), by Don Whillans.

=== Free-solo by women ===
7a (5.11d):

- Coyne Crack – Length: 21 metres (69 ft) – Indian Creek Utah, (US) – 1999 – One of the first female free solos at 7a, by Steph Davis.

6c (5.11a/b):

- Scarface – Length: 22 metres (72 ft) – Indian Creek Utah, (US) – 1999 – One of the first female free solos at 6c, by Steph Davis.

6b (5.10c):

- Supercrack – Length: 30 metres (98 ft) – Indian Creek Utah, (US) – 1992 – One of the first female free solos at 6b, by Catherine Destivelle; captured in the 1992 climbing film, Ballade à Devil's Tower.

== Boulder problems ==
=== Solved by men ===
9A+ (V18):

- Exodia – Rifugio de Barbara (ITA) – November 2025 – First ascent by Elias Iagnemma of a Christian Core project, who proposed the grade at 9A+ (V18), which would be the world's first-ever at this grade. In October 2026, Adam Ondra made the first repetition and proposed a downgrade to 9A (V17), arguing that it was "harder than Soudain Seul, similar to Alphane or Monte Fato".

9A (V17): (Note: Excluded from V17: Charles Albert's No Kpote Only (2019) was proposed at V17 but was downgraded by the first and second repeaters, Ryohei Kameyama (to V16 in 2020) and Nicolas Pelorson respectively (to V15 in 2020). Shawn Raboutou's Megatron (November 2022), was the fifth ascent of a V17 boulder.)

- Burden of Dreams – Lappnor (FIN) – October 2016 – First ascent by Nalle Hukkataival; confirmed by Will Bosi in April 2023.
- Soudain Seul – Coquibus Rumont (FRA) – February 8, 2021 – First ascent by Simon Lorenzi; disputed by Nicolas Pelorson (2021), who felt it was V16, but generally upheld at V17 on future repeats including from Adam Ondra who felt it could be a "soft [V17]".
- Return of the Sleepwalker – Red Rock Canyon (US) – April 2021 – First ascent by Daniel Woods; a sit start into Jimmy Webb's Sleepwalker 8C+ (V16); confirmed by Will Bosi in February 2024.
- Alphane – Chironico (SUI) – April 6, 2022 – First ascent by Shawn Raboutou, and first repeat by Aidan Roberts (October 2022). Grade confirmed by William Bosi (November 2022).

8C+ (V16): (Note: Excluded from 8C+: Dai Koyamada's The Wheel of Life (2004), once considered the first 8C+ but since downgraded to 8C (V15); it links several boulder problems over 68 moves and is now regarded as more a sport climbing route, with grade of 9a (5.14d).)

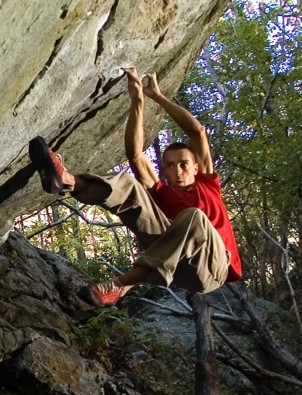
Christian Core on Gioia

- Gioia – Varazze (ITA) – 2008 – Considered the first-ever 8C+ (V16), by Christian Core. First repeat in 2011 by Adam Ondra who proposed an 8C+ grade, describing the boulder as one of the hardest in the world, together with Terranova (see below). Third ascent by Nalle Hukkataival in 2014, and Niccolo Ceria in 2020, who were silent on grade. In 2015, new chipped holds were discovered on the route, which Core tried to fix but not with complete success, leaving one new crimp that Core felt lowers the grade. In 2021, a fifth repeat by Elias Iagnemma suggested a slightly lower grade of 8C/+ (using a kneepad).
- Livin' Large – Rocklands (ZAF) – August 2009 – First ascent by Nalle Hukkataival who graded it 8C (V15) which first repeat by Jimmy Webb (2015) upheld; however, a second and third repeat by Shawn Raboutou (2018) and Ryuichi Murai (2023), suggests it is more likely an 8C+ (V16) boulder.
- Hypnotized Minds – Rocky Mountain (US) – October 2010 – Considered one of the first-ever consensus 8C+ (V16) boulders, by Daniel Woods who initially proposed V15; first repeat by Rustam Asatowitsch Gelmanow (2016), and a second repeat by Dave Graham (2019), confirmed it as V16.
- Terranova – Holstejn (Moravsky Kras, CZE) – November 2011 – Considered an early 8C+ (V16), by Adam Ondra. Remains unrepeated (January 2025)

8C (V15): (Note: Not included in V15: Markus Bock's Gossip (April 2002) was proposed by Bock at 8B+ (V14) but later revised upwards by Bock to 8C (V15), however, a first repeat by John Gaskins disputed the grade and felt it was closer to 8B+ (V14); led to a very acrimonious public exchange with Bock.) (Note: Not included in V15: Klem Loskot's Emotional Landscapes SS (November 2002), was originally proposed by Loskot at 8B+ (V14), and Martin Moser's 2004 repeat was silent on the grade (he used different beta), however, Nalle Hukkataival's second repeat in 2014 (who also used different beta) suggested a possible 8C (V15), one of the world's first; currently listed at 8B+/C (note the standing start is 8A+).)

- Monkey Wedding – Rocklands (ZAF) – August 2002 – First-ever consensus 8C (V15), by Fred Nicole.
- Black Eagle SDS – Rocklands (ZAF) – August 2002 – Second-ever consensus 8C (V15), by Fred Nicole.
- Viva l'Evolution – Tyrol (AUT) – September 2002 – Third-ever consensus 8C (V15), by Bernd Zangerl.
- Walk Away SDS – Lake District (ENG) – October 2002 – Considered the fourth-ever 8C (V15), by John Gaskins (unrepeated).

8B+ (V14): (Note: Excluded from V14: Werner Thom's Zerberus (1997), was downgraded to V13 (8B) on its repeat by Thomas Lindinger in 2017.)

- Radja – Branson, Valais (SUI) – January 1996 – First-ever consensus 8B+ (V14), by Fred Nicole.
- Nanuk – Königsee (GER) – 1997 – After repeated in 2012, second-ever 8B+ (V14), by Klem Loskot.
- Coeur de Lion – Hueco Tanks (US) – 1998 – Third-ever consensus 8B+ (V14), by Fred Nicole.

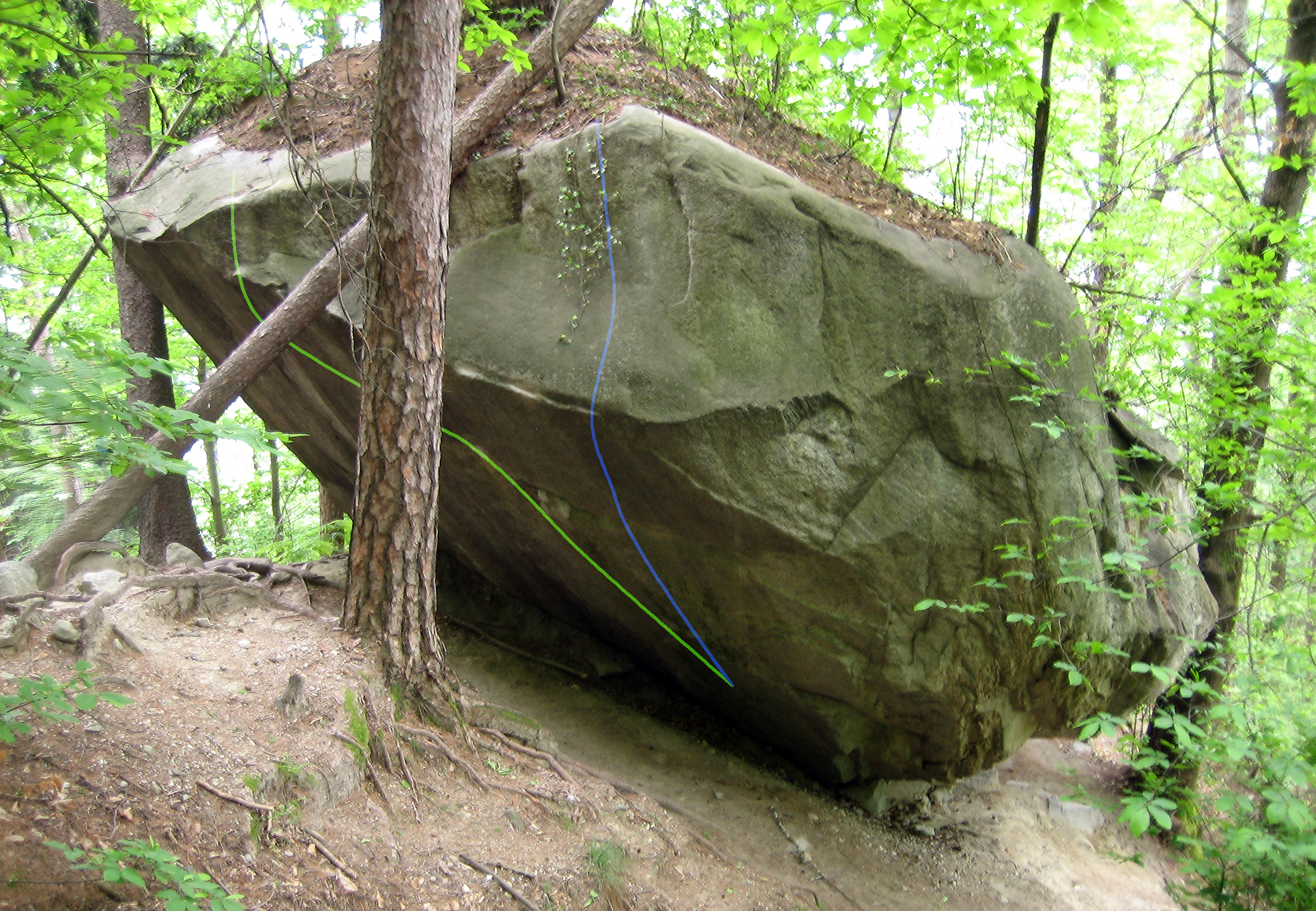
Dreamtime in Switzerland

- Dreamtime – Cresciano (SUI) – October 28, 2000 – First ascent by Fred Nicole who proposed as the world's first 8C (V15), but grade settled at 8B+ (V14) Dreamtime became as iconic as Midnight Lightning due to its beauty and challenge; a broken hold in 2009 regraded it to 8C (V15).

8B (V13):

- La Danse des Balrogs – Branson, Valais (SUI) – 1992 – First-ever consensus 8B (V13), by Fred Nicole.
- Enigma – Fontainebleau (FRA) – 1992 – Second-ever 8B (V13), by Philippe le Denmatt.
- Fatman – Fontainebleau (FRA) – 1993 – Considered important early 8B (V13), by Jacky Godoffe.
- The Dominator – Yosemite (US) – 1993 – Considered important early 8B (V13), by Jerry Moffatt.

8A+ (V12): (Note: Excluded from V12: Jacky Godoffe's Partenaire Particulier (1987), which was considered at 8A+ (V12), but has since been regraded to 8A (V11) in the main climbing databases.)

- Trice – Boulder, Colorado (US) – 1975 – Ungraded and unrepeated for 32 years, first-ever 8A+ (V12), by Jim Holloway.
- Slapshot – Flatirons (US) – 1977 – Ungraded and unrepeated for years, second-ever 8A+ (V12), by Jim Holloway, and possibly V13 (8B).
- L’à Plat du Gain – Fontainebleau (FRA) – 1988 – Considered one of the first-ever ascents of an 8A+ (V12), by Alain Ghersen.
- Superman – Cressbrook (ENG) – 1988 – Considered one of the first-ever ascents of an 8A+ (V12), by Jerry Moffatt; now a possible 8B.

8A (V11):

- C’était Demain – Fontainebleau (FRA) – 1984 – First-ever ascents of an 8A (V11), by Jacky Godoffe.
- Careless Torque – Stanage Edge (ENG) – 1987 – Considered one of the first-ever ascents of an 8A+ (V12), by Ron Fawcett; now at 8A.

7C+ (V10):

- The Groove – Pueblo, Colorado (US) – 1978 – First-ever ascent of a 7C+ (V10), by John Gill.

7C (V9):

- Red Cross Overhang, or Gill Problem – Teton Range (US) – 1959 – First-ever ascent of a 7C (V9), by John Gill.
- Double Clutch – Flagstaff Mountain, Boulder, CO (US) – 1972 – Very early 7c (V8-V9) by Bob Williams.
- Speed of Light Dyno – Black Mountains (US) – 1979 – Considered an important early ascent of a 7C (V9), by John Long.
- L'Abbé Résina – Fontainebleau (FRA) – 1983 – Considered an important early ascent of a 7C (V9), by Pierre Richard.

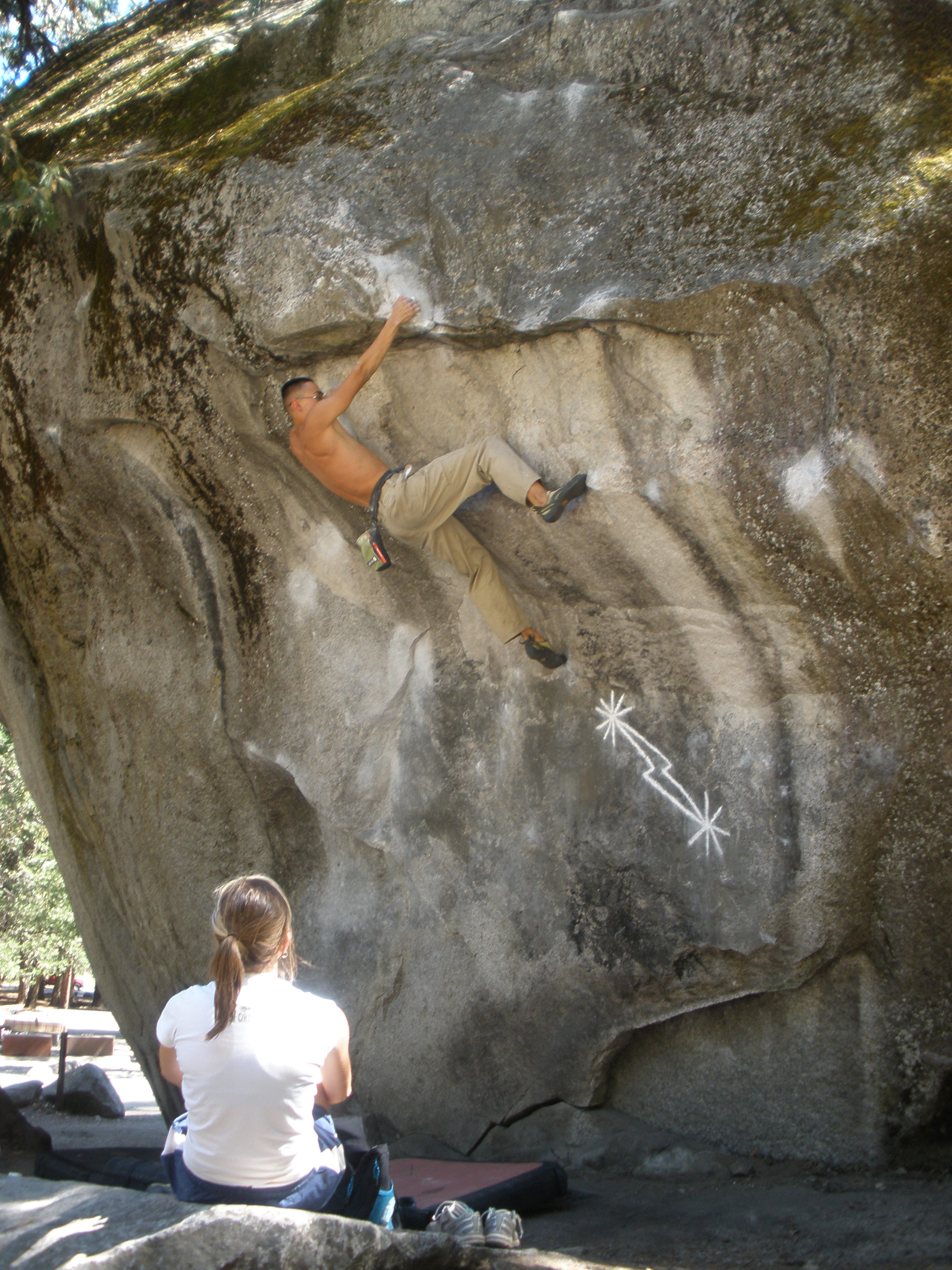
Climber on Midnight Lightning

7B+ (V8):

- Le Carnage – Fontainebleau (FRA) – 1977 – First-ever ascent of a 7B+ (V8), by Jérôme Jean-Charles.
- Midnight Lightning – Camp 4, Yosemite (US) – 1978 – Second-ever ascent of a 7B+ (V8), by Ron Kauk.

7B (V8):

- Gill Right Problem – Teton Range (US) – 1958 – First-ever ascent of a V8 (7B/7B+), by John Gill.

7A (V6):

- Le Joker – Fontainebleau (FRA) – 1953 – First-ever ascent of a V6 (7A), by Robert Paragot.

6A (V3):

- Marie-Rose – Fontainebleau (FRA) – 1946 – First-ever ascent of a V3 (6A/6A+), by Rene Ferlet.

=== Solved by women ===
8C+ (V16) :

- The Dark Side – Yosemite National Park, (US) – April 2025 – First-ever female ascent of a consensus 8C+ (V16), by Katie Lamb.

8C/8C+ (V15/16) :

- Box Therapy – RMNP, (US) – 28 July 2023 – First-ever female ascent of an 8C+ (V16), by Katie Lamb. Originally solved by Daniel Woods in 2018 who graded it 8C+ (V16), and upheld by repeaters, Brooke Raboutou suggested it was at 8C (V15) after repeating it in October 2023.

8C (V15):

- E la nave va – Lindental, (SUI) – 2003 – First-ever female ascent of an 8C (V15) boulder traverse, by Josune Bereziartu.
- Horizon – Mount Hiei, (JPN) – March 22, 2016 – First-ever female ascent of an 8C (V15), by Ashima Shiraishi.
- Sleepy Rave – Hollow Mountain Cave, (AUS) – 2 August 2016 – Second-ever female ascent of an 8C (V15), by Ashima Shiraishi.
- Kryptos – Morchelstock, Balsthal, (SUI) – June, 2018 – Third-ever female ascent of an 8C (V15), by Kaddi Lehmann.
- Byaku-dou – Mount Hurai, (JPN) – May 5, 2019 – Fourth-ever female ascent of an 8C (V15), by Mishka Ishi.

8B+ (V14):

- La traversia De Balzola – Balzola, (ESP) – 2002 – First-ever female ascent of an 8B+ (V14) boulder traverse, by Josune Bereziartu.
- Catharsis – Shiobara, (JPN) – 20 October 2012 – First-ever female ascent of an 8B+ (V14), by Tomoko Ogawa.
- Golden Shadow – Rocklands, (RSA) – 11 July 2014 – Second-ever female ascent of an 8B+ (V14), by Ashima Shiraishi.
- New Base Line – Magic Wood, (SUI) – 12 July 2014 – Third-ever female ascent of an 8B+ (V14), by Shauna Coxsey.

8B (V13): (Note: Not included in V13: Therese Johansen's ascent of Bernd Zangerl's Propaganda (May 2011) would have ranked as the third-ever female ascent of a V13 (8B), but she downgraded the boulder herself to hard V12 or maybe V13 after climbing it.)

- The Automator – RMNP, (US) – 17 August 2010 – First-ever female ascent of an 8B (V13), by Angie Payne.
- The Riverbed – Magic Wood, (SUI) – 16 September 2010 – Second-ever female ascent of an 8B (V13), by Anna Stöhr.
- Crow of Aragorn – Hueco Tanks, (US) – 20 March 2012 – Third-ever female ascent of 8B (V13), by Ashima Shiraishi, and youngest (age 10).

8A+ (V12):

- Liaison Futile – Fontainebleau, (FRA) – 13 April 1999 – First-ever female ascent of an 8A+ (V12), by Catherine Miquel.
- Atomic Playboy – Fontainebleau, (FRA) – 2 March 2001 – Second-ever female ascent of an 8A+ (V12), by Catherine Miquel.
- Solaris – Baltzoia, (SPA) – 15 April 2003 – Third-ever female to ascend a 8A+ (V12), by Josune Bereziartu.

8A (V11):

- Duel – Fontainebleau, (FRA) – October, 1998 – First-ever female ascent of an 8A (V11), by Catherine Miquel.
- Berezi – Larraona, (SPA) – 2001 – Second-ever female ascent of a consensus 8A (V11), by Josune Bereziartu.

7C+/8A :

- Sale gosse assis – Fontainebleau, (FRA) – 1998 – First-ever female ascent of an 7C+/8A , by Catherine Miquel.
- Plain High Drifter – The Buttermilks, (US) – March, 2001 – Second-ever female ascent of a consensus 7C+/8A , by Lisa Rands.

7C+ (V10):

- Halloween – Fontainebleau, (FRA) – 1997/96 – First-ever female ascent of a 7C+ (V10), by Catherine Miquel.
- Le Grande Bleu – Fontainebleau, (FRA) – 1999 – Second-ever female ascent of a 7C+ (V10), by Catherine Miquel.

7C (V9):

- Miss World – Fontainebleau, (FRA) – 1996 – First-ever female ascent of a 7C (V9), by Catherine Miquel.
- Mayonnaise de Passion – Fontainebleau, (FRA) – 1996 – Second-ever female ascent of a 7C (V9), by Catherine Miquel.

7B+ (V8):

- Nat's Traverse – Mortar Rock, (US) – 1988 – First-ever female ascent of a 7B+ (V8) boulder traverse, by Susan Patenaude.
- Le Carnage –Fontainebleau, (FRA) – 1989 – First-ever female ascent of a 7B+ (V8), by Catherine Miquel.
- Trois graines d'éternité – Fontainebleau, (FRA) – 1995 – Second-ever female ascent of a 7B+ (V8), by Dany Riche.
- Midnight Lightning – Camp 4, Yosemite, (US) – 1998 – Notable female ascent of a famous 7B+ (V8), by Lynn Hill.

== Multi-pitch routes ==
Given the smaller number of entries for multi-pitch and big wall routes, the sections below combine milestones for overall and female ascents. In some cases (e.g. Astroman, Salathé Wall and Dawn Wall), the first free ascent was by climbers alternating free leads, while the others followed on aid. In such instances, the first individual to free climb all the pitches is also recorded.

=== Redpointed ===
9a+ (5.15a):

- Valhalla (405-meters, 14 pitches) – Grand Arch, Getu Valley National Park (CHN) – 4 March 2019 – The world's longest continuous roof climb and the first-ever big wall redpoint at 9a+ (5.15a), by Edu Marin.

9a (5.14d):

- The Dawn Wall (3,000-feet, 32-pitches) – El Capitan, Yosemite (USA) – 14 January 2015 – First-ever big wall redpoint at 9a (5.14d), by Tommy Caldwell and Kevin Jorgeson in 19 days. First repeat on 21 November 2016 by Adam Ondra in 8 days, leading all 32-pitches.
- Wu Wei (180-metres, 5-pitches) – Picco delle Aquile, Dolomites (ITA) – 16 August 2023 – Second-ever multi-pitch redpoint at 9a (5.14d), by Alessandro Zeni.

8c+ (5.14c):

- Lurgorri (250-metres, 6-pitches) – Naranjo de Bulnes (ESP) – 13 August 2006 – First-ever multi-pitch redpoint at 8c+ (5.14c), by brothers Iker Pou and Eneko Pou .
- Nirwana (200-metres, 5-pitches) – Sonnwendwand, (AUT) – 9 September 2012 – Second-ever multi-pitch redpoint at 8c+ (5.14c), by Alexander Huber.

8c (5.14b):

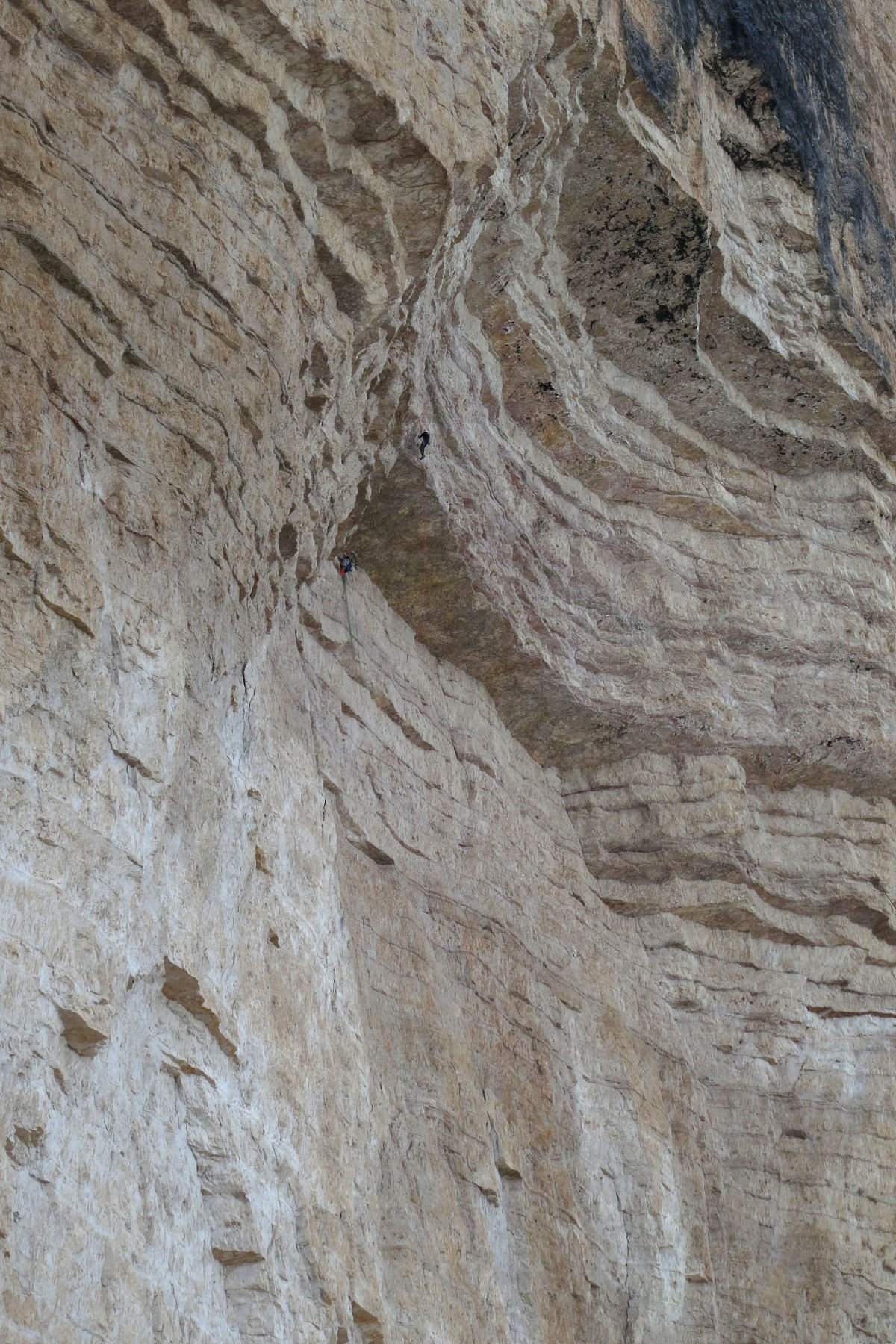
Climbers on the roof of Pan Aroma (and Bellavista) 8c (5.14b) on the Cima Ovest in the Dolomites

- Bellavista (500-metres, 10-pitches) – Cima Ovest, Dolomites (ITA) – 18 July 2001 – First-ever big wall redpoint at 8c (5.14b), by Alexander Huber; repeating the route in 2007 (to create Pan Aroma, also 8c), Huber found some key holds were "treated" from a 2005 attempt, and the crux was heavily lined with pegs, which had softened the grade to 8b/8b+.
- Pan Aroma (450-metres, 9-pitches) – Cima Ovest, Dolomites (ITA) – 26 July 2007 – Second-ever big wall redpoint at 8c (5.14b), by Alexander Huber; shares the first 5 pitches of Bellavista to the great roof and then follows Bauer's famous aid climbing route.
- WoGü (250-metres, 7-pitches) – Rätikon (SUI) – 26 July 2008 – Third-ever multi-pitch redpoint at 8c (5.14b), by a 15-year old Adam Ondra; created by Beat Kammerlander who never fully freed the line.
- Orbayu (510-metres, 13-pitches) – Naranjo de Bulnes (ESP) – 2009 – Fourth-ever big wall redpoint at 8c (5.14b), by brothers Iker Pou and Eneko Pou .

8b+ (5.14a):

- Neverending Story (450-metres, 11-pitches) – 7th Kirlichspitze, Rätikon (SUI) – 1991 – First big wall at 8b+ (5.14a), by Beat Kammerlander.
- The Nose (870-metres, 31-pitches) – El Capitan, Yosemite (USA) – 1993 – Second big wall at 5.14a (8b+), by Lynn Hill (partnered by Brooke Sandahl); a major milestone in female rock climbing; in 1994, Hill led it all in under 24 hours;.
- The Alpine Trilogy were the next 8b+ (5.14a) graded multi-pitch routes to be freed:
  - Des Kaisers neue Kleider, (250-metres, 9-pitches) – Fleischbank (AUT) – 1994 – Multi-pitch at 5.14a (8b+), by Stefan Glowacz.
  - The End of Silence (350-metres, 11-pitches) – Berchtesgaden (GER) – 1994 – Big wall at 5.14a (8b+), by Thomas Huber.
  - Silbergeier (185-metres, 6-pitches) – Rätikon (SWZ) – 1993/94 – Multi-pitch at 5.14a (8b+), by Beat Kammerlander.

8a+ (5.13c):

- New Age (150-metres, 5-pitches) – 7th Kirlichspitze, Rätikon (SUI) – 1989 – First multi-pitch at 8a+ (5.13c), by Beat Kammerlander.

8a (5.13b):

- Salathé Wall (870-metres, 35-pitches) – El Capitan, Yosemite (USA) – 1988 – First big wall free climb at 8a (5.13b), by Todd Skinner and Paul Piana (alternating free leads). In 1995, Alexander Huber led all 35-pitches to become the first individual to free a big wall route at the grade.

7c+ (5.13a):

- Via Acacia (330-metres, 9-pitches) – 5th Kirlichspitze, Rätikon (SUI) – 1988 – First big wall free climb at 7c+ (5.13a), by Martin Scheel.

7b+ (5.12c):

- Pichenibule (400-meters, 11-pitches) – Barre de l' Escales Verdon (FRA) – 1980 – Early big wall FFA at 7b+ by Patrick Berhault.
- Hall of Mirrors (650-meters, 16 pitches) – Glacier Point, Yosemite (USA) – Sept 1980 – Early big wall free climb at 7b+ (5.12c) by Chris Cantwell, Scott Burk, Scott Cole.
- Amarcord (400-metres, 9-pitches) – 7th Kirlichspitze, Rätikon (SUI) – 1984 – Big wall free climb at 7b+ (5.12c), by Martin Scheel.

7b (5.12b)

- Regular Northwest Face (690-meters, 24 pitches) – Half Dome, Yosemite (USA) – 1976 – First big wall free climb at 7b (5.12b) by Art Higbee and Jim Erickson. 20 years later, a variation to the crux 3rd Zigzag pitch was found to allow a free ascent at 5.12a.
- Pegasus (440-meters, 14-pitches) – West Quarter Dome Yosemite (US) – 1979 – Early big wall free climb at 5.12b/c by Mark Hudon and Max Jones.

7a+ (5.12a):

- Macabre Wall (180-meters, 5-pitches) – Ogden UT (US) – July 1967 – First multi-pitch free climb at 7a+ flashed by Greg Lowe.
- Air Voyage (550-meters, 13-pitches) – Black Canyon National Park CO (US) – 1978 – First big wall free climb at 7a+ by Leonard Coyne and Ken Simms.
- D1 Original Line (420-meters, 10-pitches) – Longs Peak Rocky Mountain NP CO – (US) – July 1980 – Second big wall free climb at 7a+ by Roger Briggs and Jeff Achey.

7a (5.11d):

- Mittelpfeiller (300-meters, 7-pitches) – Heiligkreuzkofel – Dolomites – (ITA) – July 6,7 1968 – First-ever big wall free climb at 7a by Reinhold and Günther Messsner.
- Via Lacedelli (620-meters, 16-pitches) – Cima Scotoni Dolomites – (ITA) – 1979 – Second big wall FFA at 7a by Kurt Albert.

6c+ (5.11b/c):

- Naked Edge (220-metres, 7-pitches) – Eldorado Canyon CO – (USA) – Oct 3, 1971 – First multi-pitch free climb at 5.11b by Jim Erickson and Duncan Ferguson.
- Astroman (300-metres, 12-pitches) – Washington Column Yosemite (USA) – May 1975 – First big wall free climb at 5.11c by Ron Kauk, John Long, John Bachar (alternating free leads). First repeat in June 1977 by Ron Kauk, leading all 12 pitches (belayed by Werner Braun).
- The Yellow Wall (420-meters, 11-pitches) – Longs Peak Rocky Mountain National Park CO – (US) –1976 – Early big wall free climb at 5.11b by Roger Briggs and Rob Candelaria.

6c (5.11a/b):

- Schwager Talseite (60-meters, 3-pitches) – Schrammsteine Saxon Switzerland (DEU) – 1952 – First multi-pitch free climb with obligatory Sax VIIIc by Harry Rost.
- Athlete's Feat (95-meters, 5-pitches) – Boulder Canyon, Castle Rock (US) – 1964 – Second-ever multi-pitch FFA at 6c by Royal Robbins and Pat Ament.

6b+ (5.10d/11a):

- Rebitsch-Spiegl (290-metres, 8-pitches) – Fleischbank Wilder Kaiser – (AUT) – June 20, 1946 – First multi-pitch free climb at 5.10d (UIAA VII) by Mathias Rebitsch, Sepp Speigl.
- The Cruise (515-meters, 12-pitches) – Black Canyon NP CO – (US) – May 1976 – Second big wall FFA at 5.10d by Jimmie Dunn and Earl Wiggins.
- Via Comici Dimai (540-meters, 17-pitches) – Tre Cima Dolomites – (ITA) – July 17, 1978 – Early big wall FFA by Jean Claude Droyer.

6b (5.10c):

- Nordverschneidung (810-meters, 21-pitches) – Lalidererwand Karwendel – (AUT) – 1947 – First big wall free climb at 6b by Mathias Rebitsch and Franz Lorenz.
- Inverted Staircase (364-meters, 9-pitches) – Fairview Dome Yosemite NP – (US) – 1963 August – Big wall free climb at 5.10b/c by Bob Kamps and Wally Reed.
- East Buttress (330-meters, 12-pitches) – Middle Cathedral Rock Yosemite – (US) – 1964 – Big wall FFA at 5.10c by Frank Sacherer and Ed Leeper.

6a+ (5.10b):

- Via Vinatzer (830-metres, 29-pitches) – Marmolada Dolomites – (ITA) – Sept 2,3 1936 – First big wall free climb at 6a+ by Gian Battista Vinatzer and Ettore Castiglioni.
- Brown-Whillans (350-meters, 11-pitches) – Aiguille de Blaitiere Mont Blanc – (FRA) – 1954 – Alpine big wall free climb at 6a+ by Joe Brown and Don Whillans.

6a (5.10a):

- Via Micheluzzi (720-metres, 19-pitches) – Marmolada Dolomites – (ITA) – August 6,7 1929 – First ever big wall climb at UIAA grade VI+ by Luigi Micheluzzi, Roberto Perathoner, Demitrio Christomannos.
- Via Carlesso Sandri (815-meters, 37-pitches) – Torre Trieste Dolomites – (ITA) – August 7-8, 1934 – Big wall with VI+ (or harder) free climbing by Raffaele Carlesso, Bartolo Sandrii.
- Via Andrich (750-meters, 18-pitches) – Monte Civetta Dolomites – (ITA) – August 23-24, 1934 – All free big wall at VI+ by Alvise Andrich and Emani Fae.

5c (5.9):

- Via Solleder (1,100-meters, 44-pitches) – Civetta Dolomites – (ITA) – August 7, 1925 – First ever big wall climb at consensus UIAA grade VI by Emil Solleder and Gustl Lettenbauer.
- North Face (850-meters, 28-pitches) – Aiguille du Dru Mont Blanc – (FRA) – August 1, 1935 – Alpine big wall climb at 5c/6a by Pierre Allain and Raymond Leiniger.

5b (5.8):

- Dibona-Rizzi (900-meters, 28-pitches) – Croz dell'Altissimo Dolomites – (ITA) – August 16 1910 – First big wall free climb at V+/VI- by Angelo Dibona, Luigi Rizzi, Max and Guido Mayer.
- West Face (350-meters, 10-pitches) – Tre Cima Dolomites – (ITA) – August 18, 1913 – Big wall free climb at UIAA V+ by Hans Dülfer and Walter von Bernauth.

5a (5.7):

- Piaz Route (600-meters, 19-pitches) – Totenkirchl Kaiser Mountains – (AUT) – Oct 13 1908 – First-ever big wall climb at UIAA V/V+ by Tita Piaz, F. Schroffeneggar, R. Scheitzold, J. Klammer.

=== Free-soloed by men ===
7c+ (5.13a):

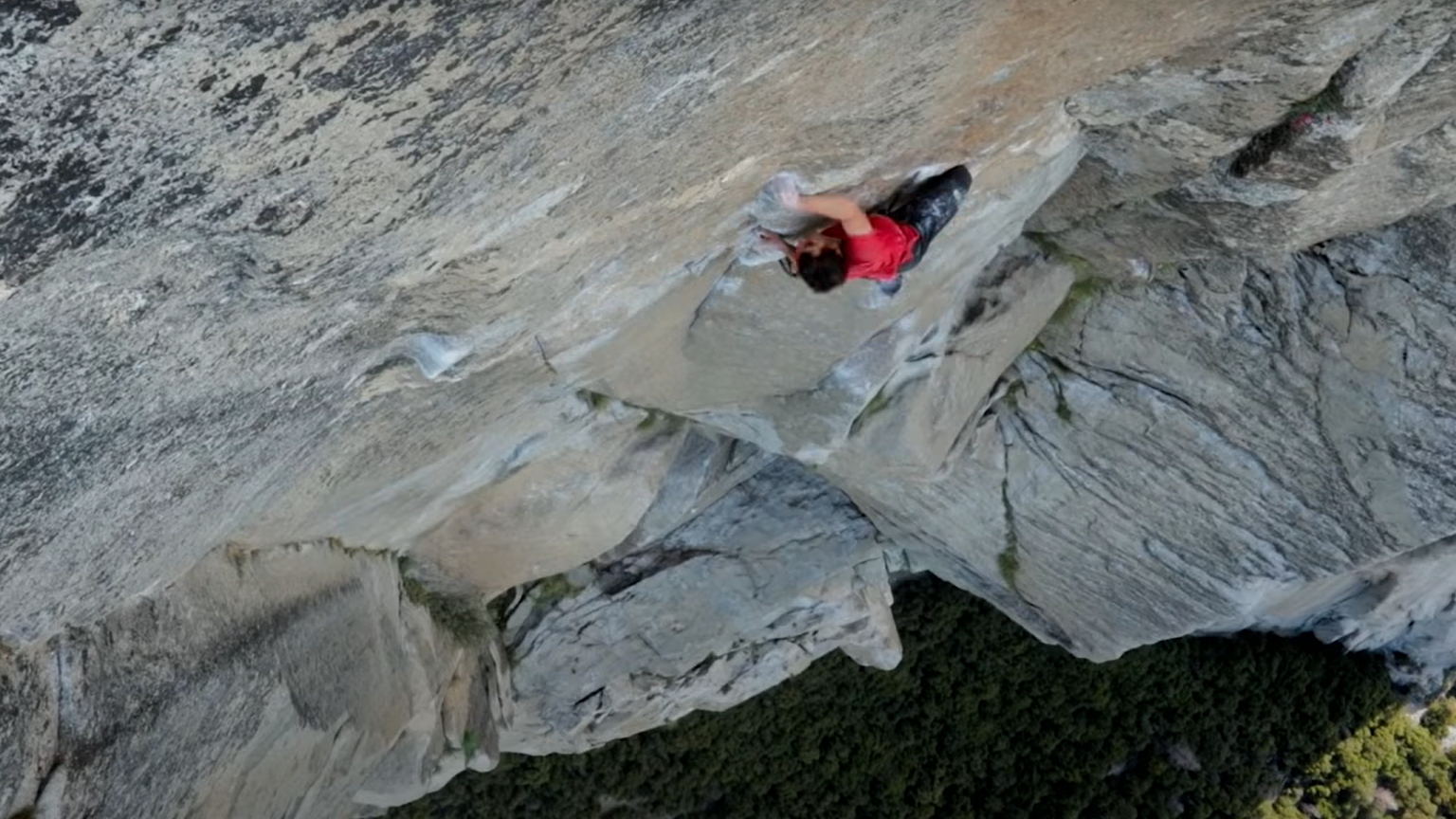
Alex Honnold's 2017 free solo of Freerider (5.13a, 7c+), El Capitan

- Freerider (915-meters, 30-pitches) – El Capitan, Yosemite (US) – 3 June 2017 – First-ever big wall free solo at 5.13a (7c+), by Alex Honnold; took 3 hours, 56 minutes.

7b+ (5.12c):

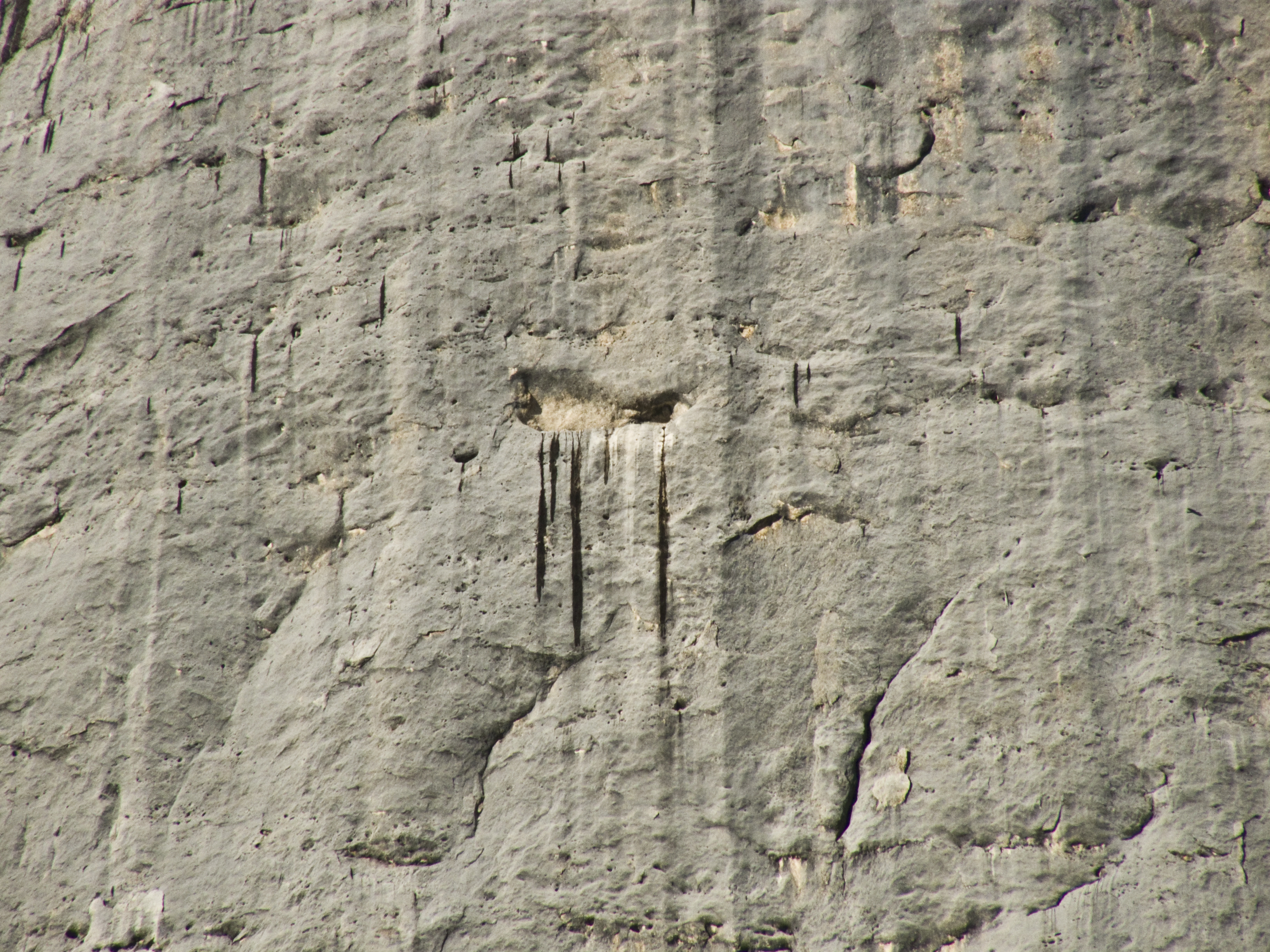
The famous "fish" feature on The Fish Route, Marmolada

- The Fish Route (850-meters, 37-pitches) – Marmolada, Dolomites (Italy) – April 2007 – First-ever big wall free solo at 7b+ (5.12c), by Hansjorg Auer; took 2 hours, 55 minutes.
- The Moonlight Buttress (364-meters, 10-pitches) – Zion National Park (USA) – 1 April 2008 – Likely the second-ever big wall free solo at 7b+ (5.12c), by Alex Honnold; took 83 minutes.

7b (5.12b):

- Romantic Warrior (305-meters, 9-pitches) – Needles, California (USA) – 2005 – Climbed on sight. First-ever big wall free solo at 7b (5.12b), by Michael Reardon;
- Deep Blue Sea (300-meters, 9-pitches) – Eiger-Nordwand (CHF) – 6 August 2008 – First-ever free BASE free-solo, and likely the second-ever big wall free solo at 7b (5.12b) by Dean Potter.

7a+ (5.12a):

- Brandler-Hasse Direttissima (580-meters, 17-pitches) – Cima Grande, Dolomites (Italy) – 2002 – First-ever big wall free solo at 7a+ (5.12a), by Alexander Huber.

7a (5.11d):

- Pilier des Fourmis (120-meters, 4-pitches) – Buoux (FRA) – 1982 – Likely the first-ever multi-pitch free solo at 7a, by Patrick Edlinger.
- L'Ange en Décomposition (100-meters, 3-pitches) – Barre de l'Escalès Verdon (FRA) – 1988 – Early multi-pitch free solo, by Alain Robert.

6c+ (5.11b/c):

- Naked Edge (210-meters, 7-pitches) – Eldorado Canyon State Park (USA) – 1978 – First-ever multi-pitch free solo at 5.11b, by Jim Collins.
- Nabisco Wall (via Butterballs) (110-meters, 3-pitches) – Yosemite Valley, (USA) – 1979 – First-ever multi-pitch free solo at 5.11c (6c+), by John Bachar.
- The Moratorium (95-meters, 4-pitches) – Schuttz's Ridge Yosemite Valley (USA) – 1980 – Onsight multi-pitch free solo at 5.11b, by John Bachar.
- Astroman (300-meters, 12-pitches) – Washington Column Yosemite Valley, (USA) – 1987 – First-ever big wall free solo at 5.11c, by Peter Croft.

6c (5.11a/b):

- Cassandra (75-meters, 3-pitches) – Ralston Buttes Golden CO (US) – January 2 1973 – First ascent and onsight multi-pitch free solo at 5.11a/b, by Jim Erickson.
- New Dimensions (95-meters, 3-pitches) – Arch Rock Yosemite Valley CA (US) – April 1976 – Early multi-pitch free solo at 5.11a, by John Bachar.
- Directe Américaine (850-meters, 21-pitches) – Petit Dru Chamonix (FRA) – June 30 1982 – Likely the first big wall free solo at 6c, by Christophe Profit.

6b+ (5.10d/11a):

- Scenic Cruise (600-meters, 14-pitches) – Black Canyon NP (USA) – 1979 – Early big wall free solo at 5.10d, by Earl Wiggins.

6a+ (5.10b):

- Solda-Conforto (700-meters, 23-pitches) – Marmolada Dolomites – 1953 – First-ever big wall free solo at 6a+, by Cesare Maestri.

6a (5.10a):

- Via Cassin (800-meters, 21-pitches) – Piz Badile (SUI) – July 1952 – First-ever Big Wall free solo at 6a, on sight in 4 hours 30 minutes, by Hermann Buhl.

5c (5.9):

- Via Solleder (1,100-meters, 44-pitches) – Civetta Dolomites (ITA) – 1952 – First-ever big wall free solo at 5c, by Cesare Maestri.

5b (5.8):

- Dülferriss (240-meters, 6-pitches) – Fleischbank Kaiser Mountains (AUT) – Sept 3 1913 – First ascent and first-ever multi-pitch free solo at VI- (5.8+), by Hans Dülfer.

5a (5.7):

- Via Piaz (280-meters, 7-pitches) – Punta Emma Rosengarten Dolomites (ITA) – 1900 – First ascent and first-ever multi-pitch free solo at V+ (5.7), by Tita Piaz.
- Piaz Route (600-meters, 19-pitches) – Totenkirchl Kaisergebirge (AUT) – July 22, 1911 – First-ever Big Wall free solo at UIAA V+ in 2 hrs 30 min, by Paul Preuss.

4c (5.6):

- Via Preuss (220-meters, 6-pitches) – Campanile Basso Brenta (ITA) – July 28, 1911 – First ascent and first-ever multi-pitch free solo at V (5.6-5.7), by Paul Preuss.

=== Free-soloed by women ===
7a (5.11d):

- Alfredo Alfredo – (280-meters, 7-pitches) – Monte Oddeu, Sardinia, (ITA) – May 2026 – One of the few female multi-pitch free solos at 7a, by Aleksandra Taistra.

6c (5.11a/b):

- Chiaro di Luna – (750-meters, 20-pitches) – Aguja Saint Exupery, Patagonia (ARG) – February 2015 – One of the few female big-wall free solos at 6c, by Brette Harrington.

6b+ (5.10d/11a):

- Pervertical Sanctuary – (350-meters, 9-pitches) – Longs Peak Rocky Mountain NP CO (US) – 2007 – Female big-wall free solo at 6b+, by Steph Davis.

== See also ==
- History of rock climbing
- Notable ascents and grade milestones in deep-water soloing
- Hardest routes in traditional climbing
- Evolution of grade milestones in dry-tooling
- Evolution of grade milestones in mixed climbing
- Evolution of grade milestones in ice climbing
