= Jim Holloway (climber) =

American rock climber

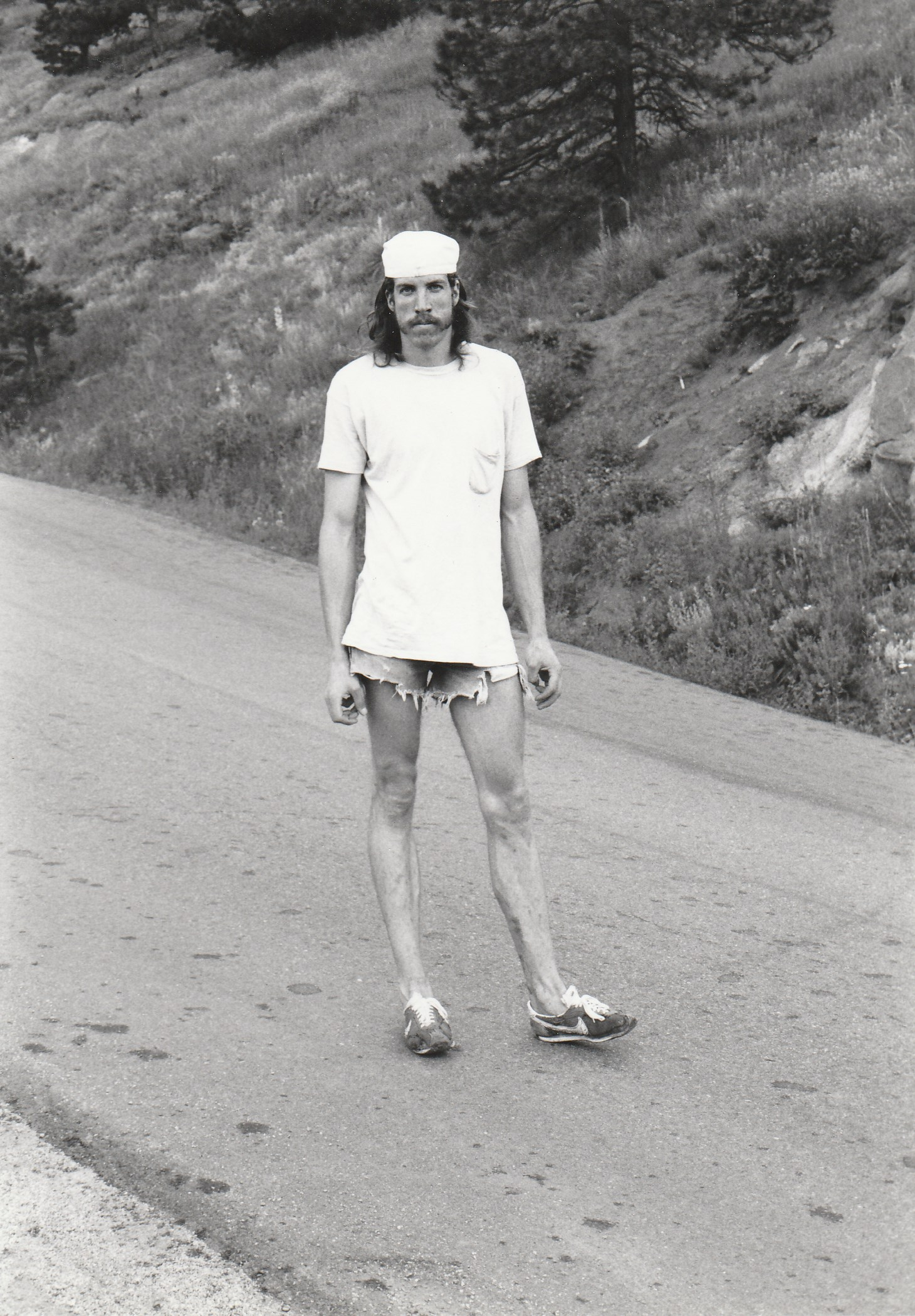
Jim Holloway on Flagstaff Mountain, Boulder, Colorado, late 1970s

Jim Holloway (born 1954), an American, was one of the first of a new generation of boulderers for whom the sport was a lifestyle rather than a recreation. He began bouldering in the early 1970s in Boulder, Colorado, and in 1973 established his first notable route, Just Right (so named because it fit his very tall frame). In 1975 he put up Trice (a.k.a. AHR - Another Holloway Route) – at today's grade of V12 (8A+), now considered the first-ever at that grade in bouldering history.

John Sherman's V-System didn't come into existence for another fifteen years. In an effort to rate his routes, Jim devised a personal variant on the old Gill B-System. For Holloway, difficulty fell into three categories: JHE (Jim Holloway easy), JHM (Jim Holloway medium), and JHH (Jim Holloway hard).

Holloway was one of the first boulderers to devote more than a few hours to creating a particular route. In the mid-1970s he began visiting Horsetooth Reservoir in Fort Collins, Colorado, where John Gill and his friend Rich Borgman had established a Dakota sandstone bouldering area. Gill's problems there, having been fashioned in a matter of minutes or hours, were far easier than the standards Jim was setting, clearly demonstrating the change in bouldering philosophy that was taking place. As an example, Holloway worked on creating a line directly up Gill's Left Eliminator, which had been done from the side. Calling his project Meathook, he worked on the problem for twenty days, between 1974 and 1975, before finally solving it. Meathook was at about V11 to V12, whereas most of the problems at Horsetooth were in the V3 to V7 range.

In 1977, Holloway climbed Slapshot, on Dinosaur Mountain near Boulder, also considered one of the world's first-ever V12 routes.

Holloway stopped bouldering about 1980 and became involved in bicycle racing.

Thirty-two years after its first ascent, Trice was repeated. On the 15th of November 2007 Carlo Traversi and Jamie Emerson made the 2nd and 3rd ascents of Trice and grading it V12 (8A+). It was repeated again by James Pearson and Daniel Woods in December 2007, by Dave Graham in January 2008, by Seth Allred in February 2008, and by Giovanni Traversi in March 2008. In October 2008 after 4 days of effort Alex Puccio made the first female free ascent (FFFA) of Trice.
