= Elias Iagnemma =

Italian rock climber (born 1995)

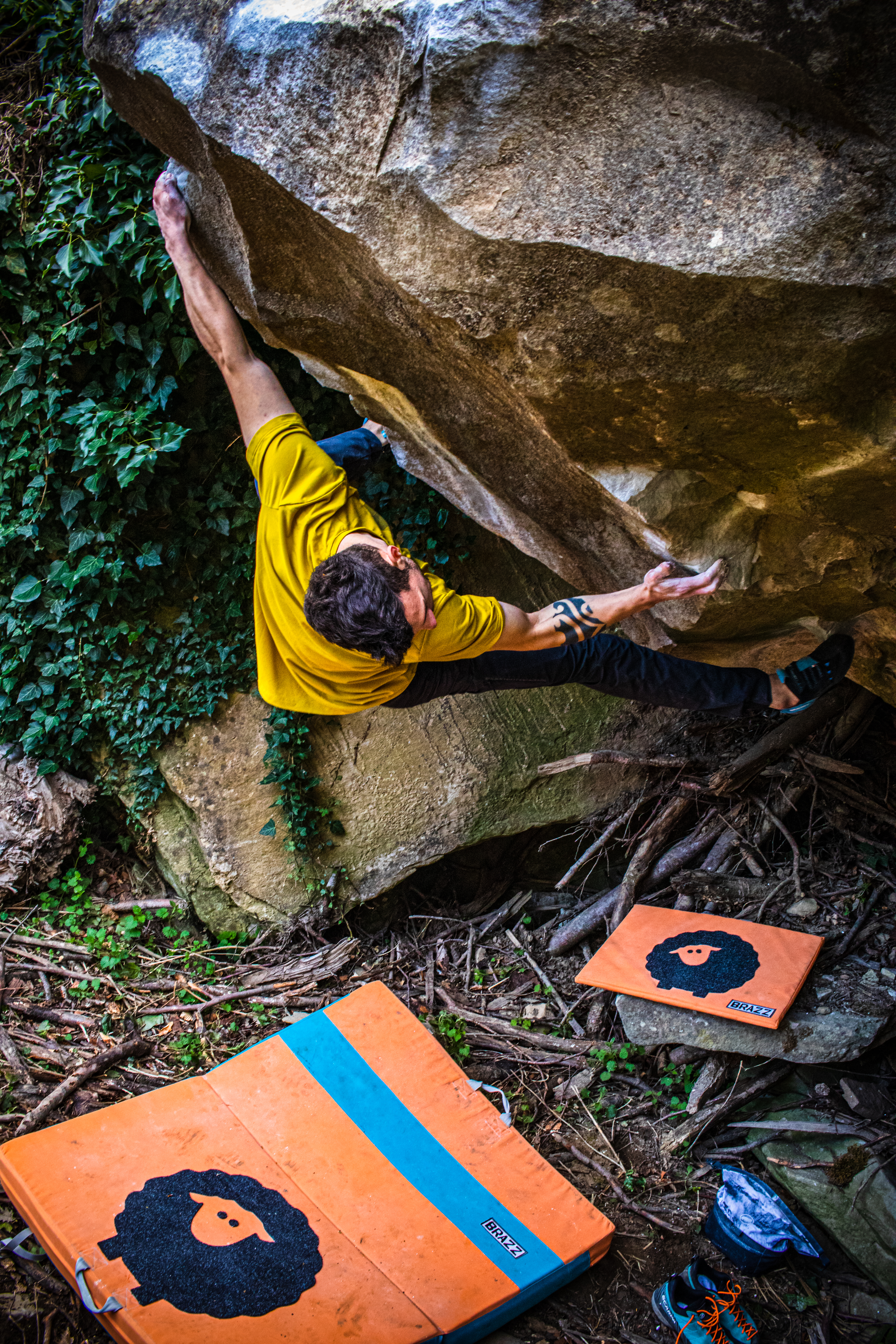
- Elias Iagnemma on Smaug (grade 8B+ V14) in Tintorale, Abruzzo in Italy

Personal information
- Nationality: Italian
- Born: 17 November 1995 (age 30) L'Aquila, Italy
- Occupation: Professional rock climber

Climbing career
- Type of climber: Competition climbing; Sport climbing; Bouldering
- Highest grade: Redpoint: 5.15a (9a+); Bouldering: 9A (V17)
- First ascents: The Big Slamm (V17, 2025): Exodia (V17, 2025)
- Known for: First person to propose a boulder at V18 (9A+)
- Updated on 18 October 2026

Elias Iagnemma (born 17 November 1995 in L'Aquila) is an Italian professional rock climber who specializes in bouldering. In March 2024, he became only the fourth person to repeat Burden of Dreams in Finland, the world's first-ever grade 9A (V17) graded bouldering route. In January 2025, Elias completed the first ascent of the first 9A in Italy, The Big Slamm, in Tintorale.

In November 2025, Iagnemma completed the first ascent of the bouldering route Exodia, in Italy, which he proposed at the grade of 9A+ (V18), which if confirmed, would have been the first-ever boulder to be climbed at that grade. In October 2026, Adam Ondra made the first repetition of Exodia, completing it in 4 days. He proposed to downgrade it to 9A (V17), arguing that it was "harder than Soudain Seul, similar to Alphane or Monte Fato".

== See also ==
- List of grade milestones in rock climbing
