= Schrammsteine =

Group of rocks in the Elbe Sandstone Mountains, Switzerland

Coordinates: 50°54′51″N 14°12′12″E

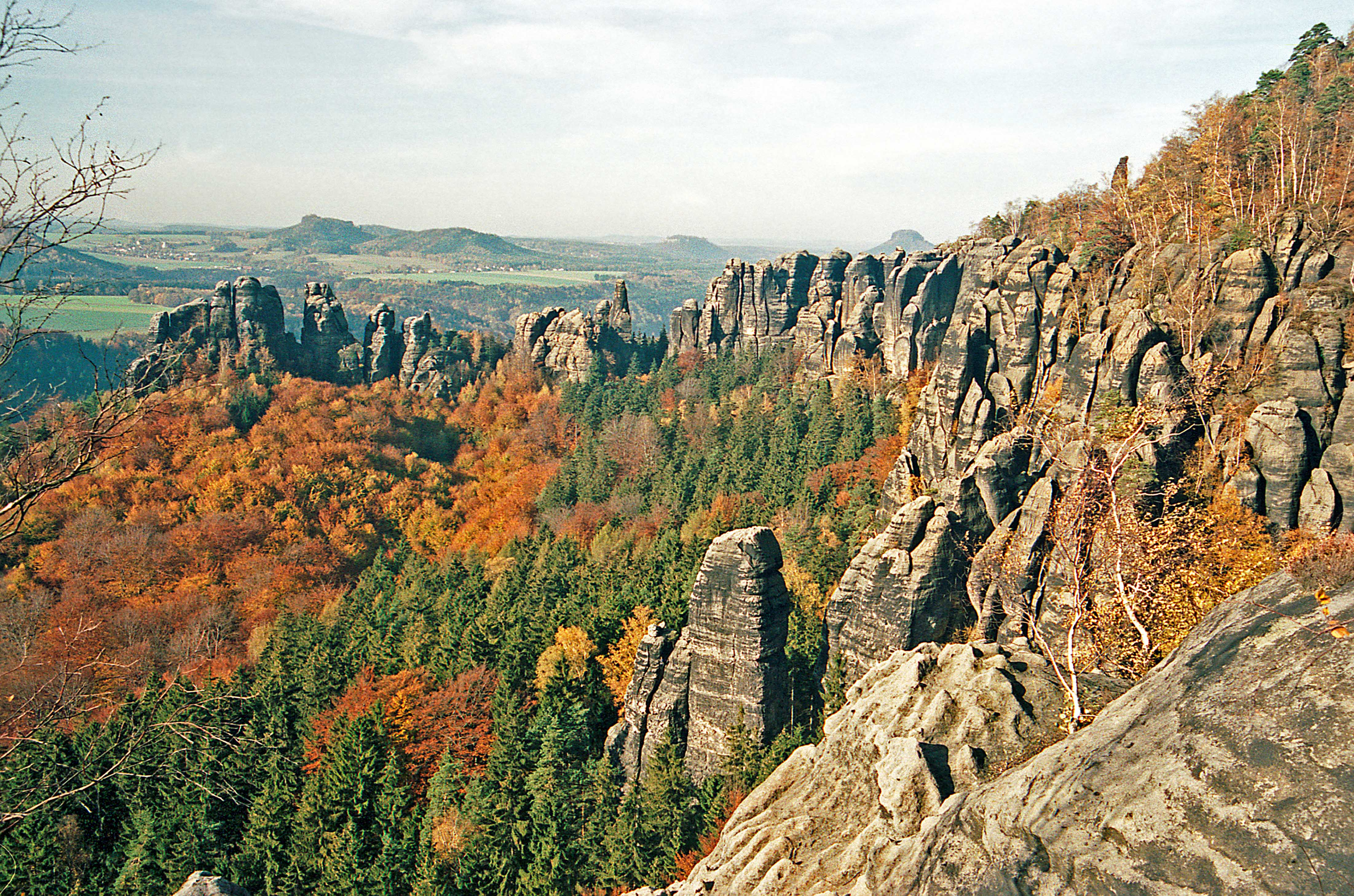
The Schrammsteine

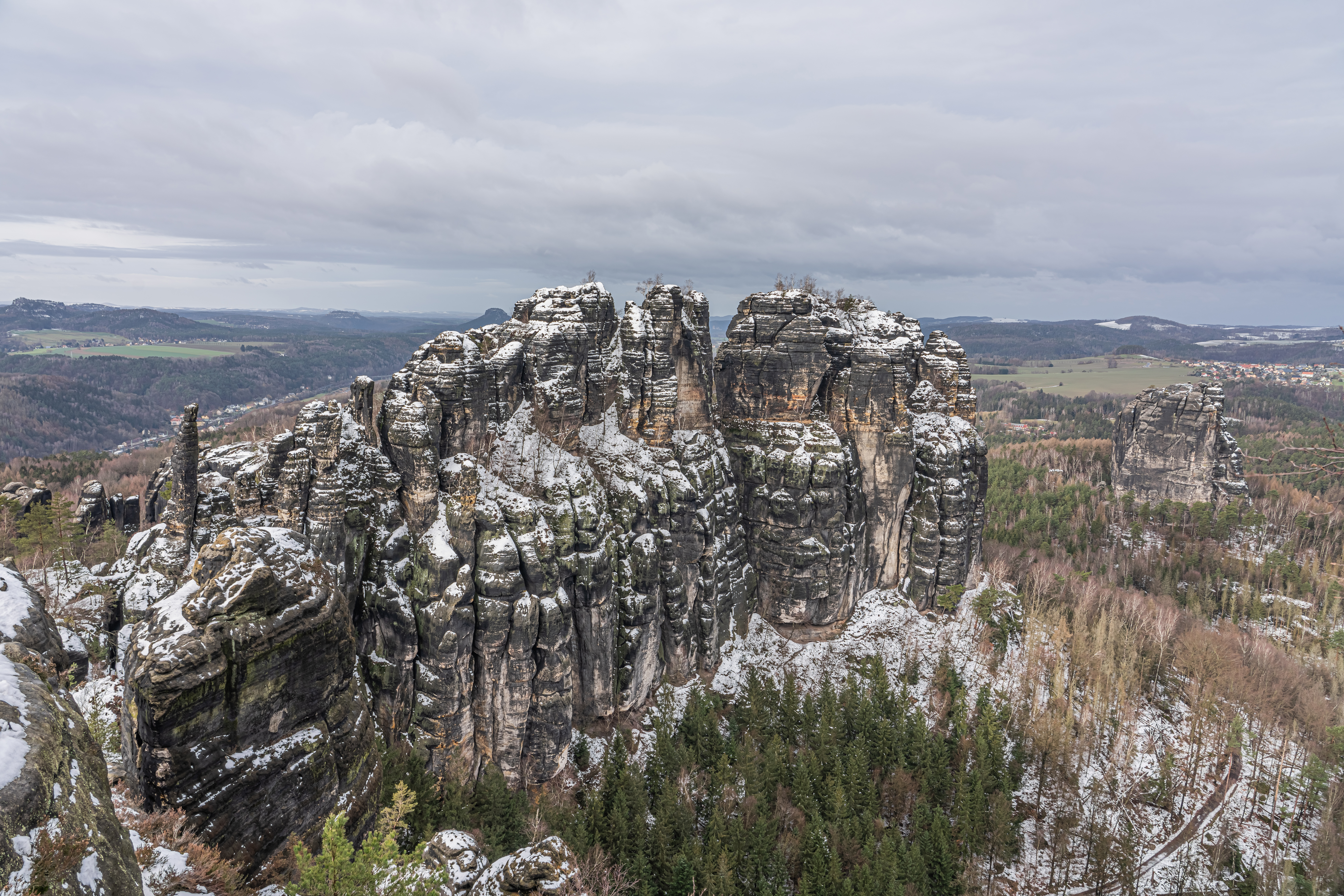
The High and Middle Torstein - part of the Schrammsteine. Background: the Falkenstein near Bad Schandau

The Schrammsteine are a long, strung-out, very jagged group of rocks in the Elbe Sandstone Mountains located east of Bad Schandau in Saxon Switzerland in eastern Germany. To the north they are bordered by the Kirnitzsch valley, to the south by the Elbe valley and to the east by the Affensteine rocks. The high point of the chain lies at over 400 m above sea level (HN). The viewing point on the Schrammsteine lies at a height of 417.2 m above HN.

== Overview ==
To the west the frontmost Torstein forms the start of the chain of rocks in the southwest. The rocks then run up to the Schrammstein viewing point, gashed by three, mighty, vertical rock openings, the Schrammtoren (Toren = gateways or openings in German, vorderer = before, hinterer = behind). This is the end of the Vordere Schrammsteine. It is followed by the Hinterer Schrammsteine that run away in the direction of Schmilka. The solitary Falkenstein with a height of 381.2 m above NHN and the Hoher Torstein at 425 m above NHN are the most important peaks in the Schrammsteine. The other summits of the rock group are almost exclusively found on the terrace-like massif of the Schrammstein ridge.

The Schrammsteine are a much frequented tourist destination; the plateau-like viewing points and the ridge being especially popular. The complex rock massif has much to offer both hikers and climbers with its multitude of trails of various levels of difficulty and its climbing rocks.

== Rotkehlchenstiege ==
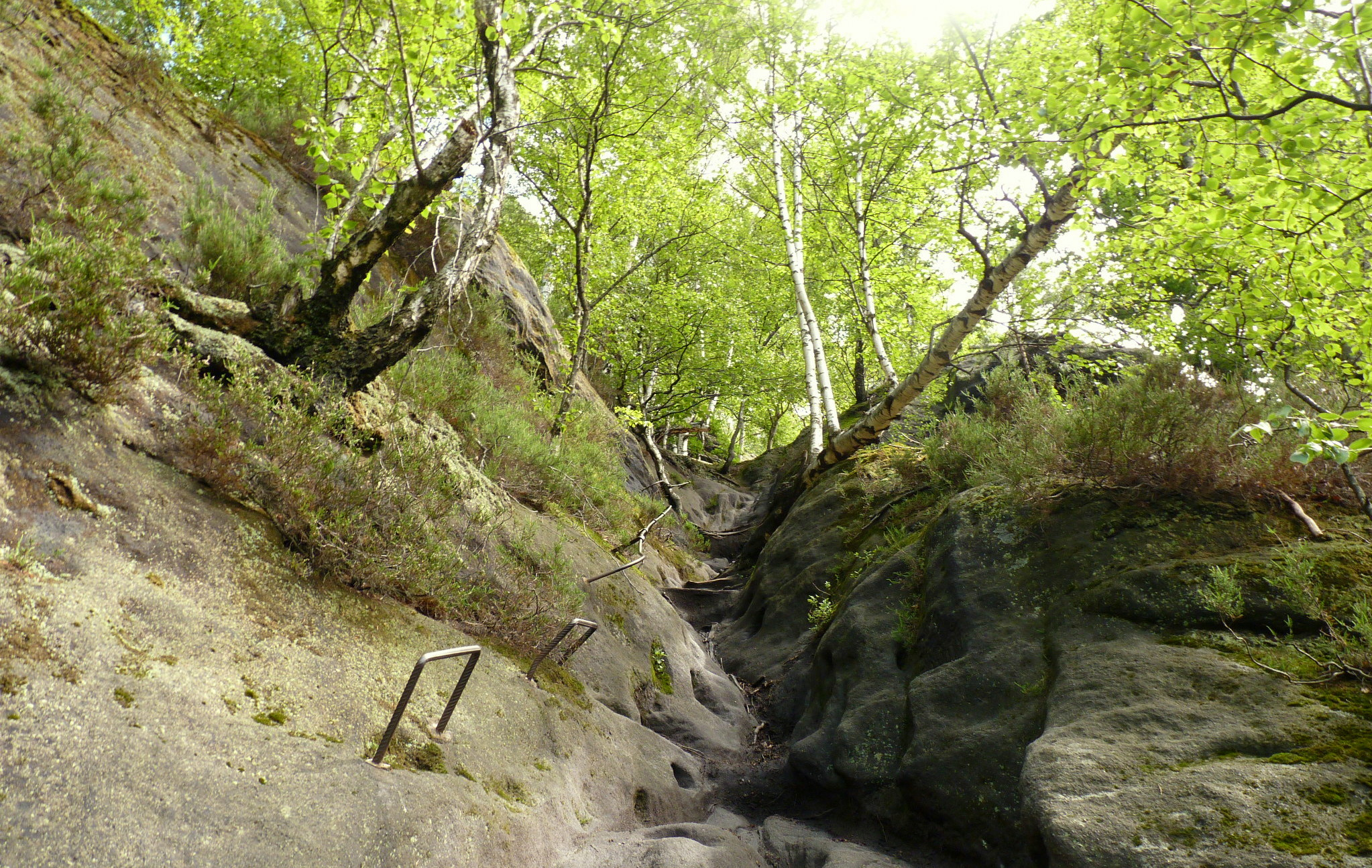
Rotkehlchenstiege

The climbing trail known as the Rotkehlchenstiege ("Robin Climb") begins at the northern end of the Falkoniergrund near Schmilka and runs up the Schrammstein Ridgeway (Gratweg). It climbs a height of 150 metres over 286 steps. It is an easy klettersteig of grade KS1, but has several vertical rock faces.

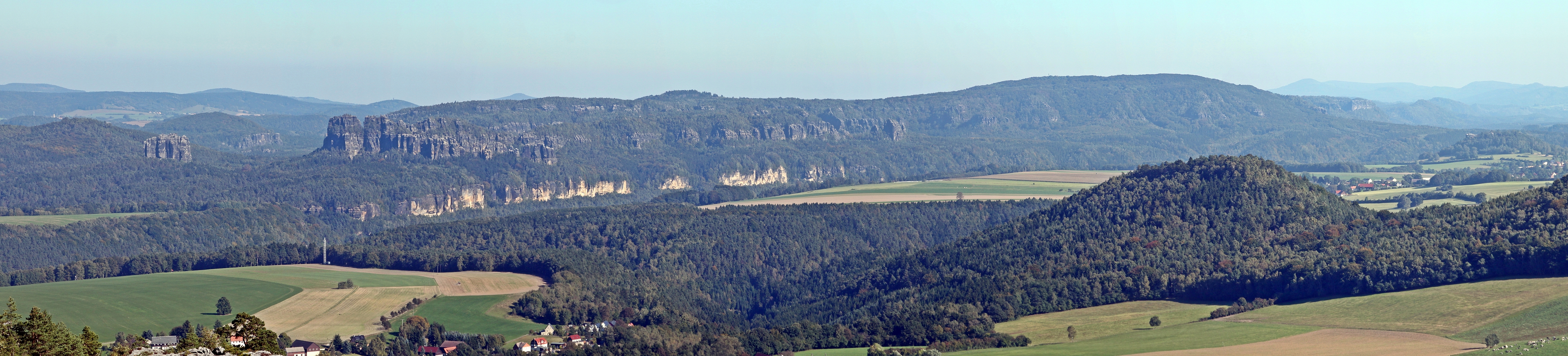
View from Papststein to Schrammsteine range and Großer Winterberg.
