= Sas dla Crusc =

Mountain in Italy

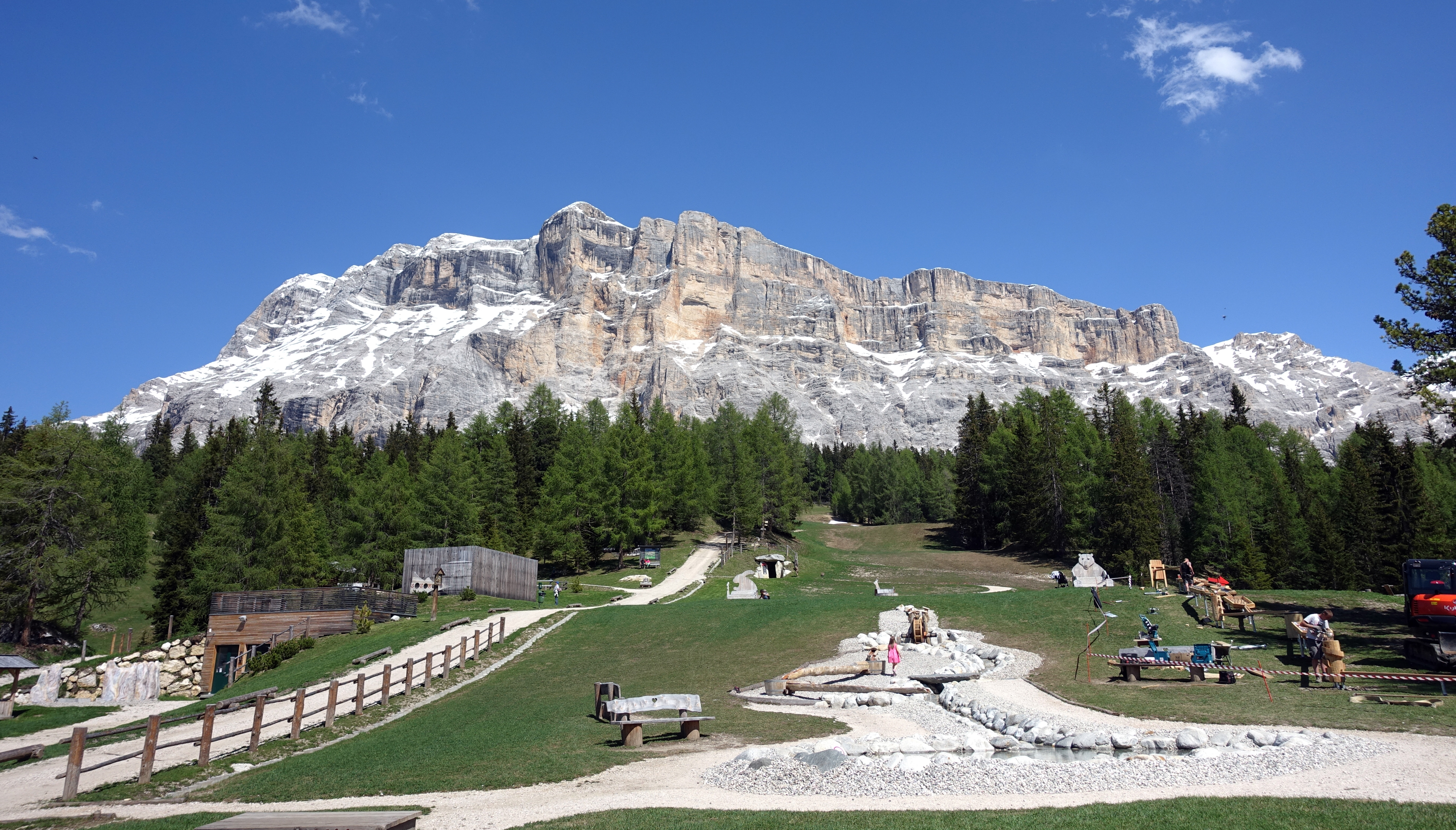

Highest point
- Elevation: 2,907 m (9,537 ft)
- Coordinates: 46°36′51.6″N 11°57′4.5″E

Geography
- Location: South Tyrol, Italy
- Parent range: Fanes group

The Sas dla Crusc (German: Heiligkreuzkofel, Italian: Sasso di Santa Croce [ˈsasso di ˈsanta ˈkroːtʃe]) is a mountain of the Fanes group in South Tyrol, Italy.
