= Omblèze =

- Commune
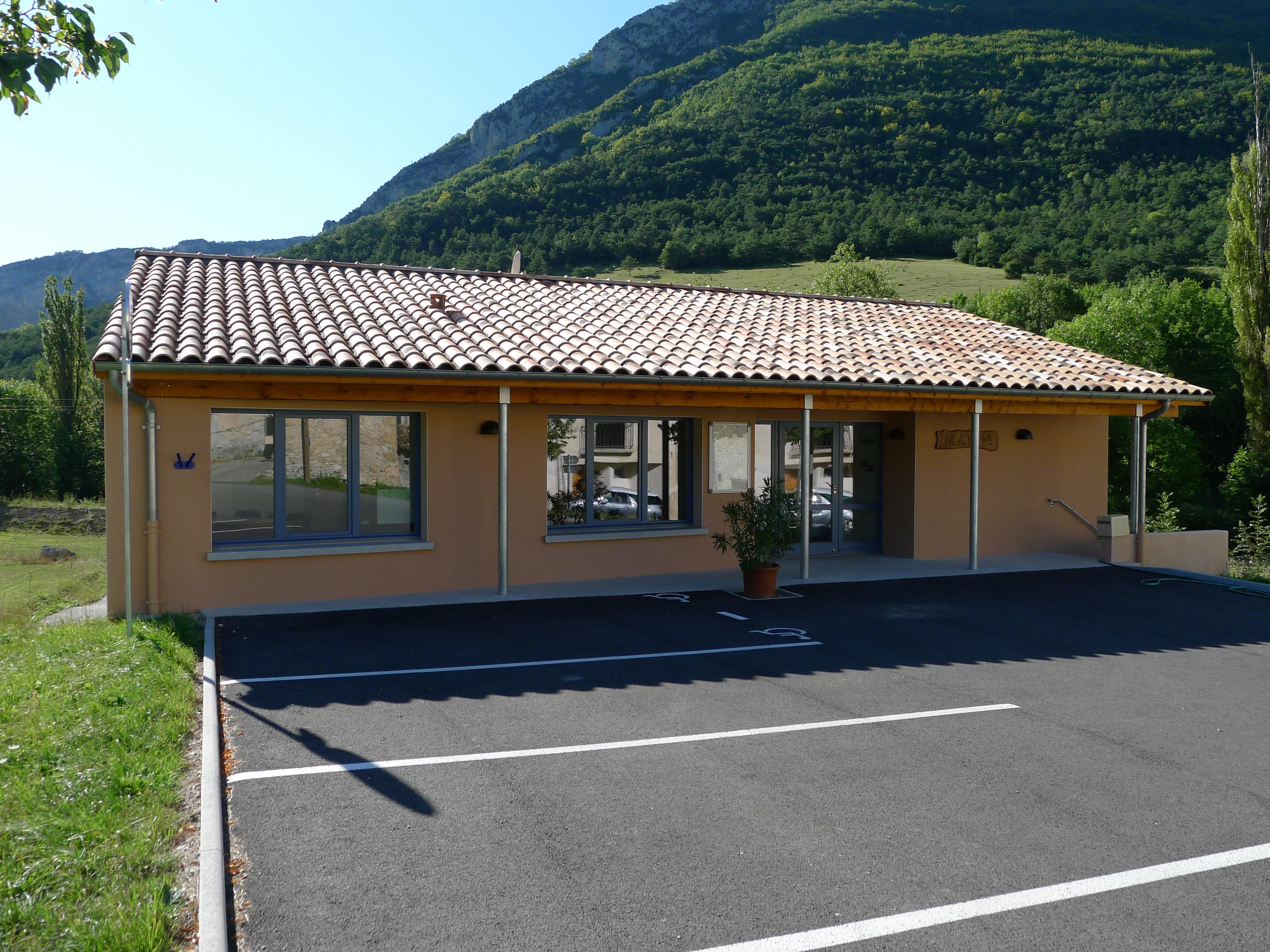
- The town hall of Omblèze
- Location of Omblèze
- Location within France Location within Auvergne-Rhône-Alpes
- Coordinates: 44°51′52″N 5°13′12″E
- Country: France
- Region: Auvergne-Rhône-Alpes
- Department: Drôme
- Arrondissement: Die
- Canton: Crest
- Intercommunality: Val de Drôme en Biovallée

Government
  - Mayor (2022–2026): Gilbert Roux
- Area^{1}: 44.92 km^{2} (17.34 sq mi)
- Highest elevation: 1,581 m (5,187 ft)
- Lowest elevation: 388 m (1,273 ft)
- Population (2023): 55
  - Density: 1.2/km^{2} (3.2/sq mi)
- Time zone: UTC+01:00 (CET)
  - Summer (DST): UTC+02:00 (CEST)
- INSEE/Postal code: 26221 /26400
- ^{1} French Land Register data, which excludes lakes, ponds, glaciers > 1 km^{2} (0.386 sq mi or 247 acres) and river estuaries.

Omblèze (French pronunciation: [ɔ̃blɛz]; Occitan: Omblèsas) is a commune in the Drôme department in southeastern France.

== Population ==
Historical population
| Year | Pop. | ±% p.a. |
|---|---|---|
| 1968 | 62 | — |
| 1975 | 52 | −2.48% |
| 1982 | 54 | +0.54% |
| 1990 | 64 | +2.15% |
| 1999 | 66 | +0.34% |
| 2007 | 72 | +1.09% |
| 2012 | 69 | −0.85% |
| 2017 | 72 | +0.85% |
| 2023 | 55 | −4.39% |
Source: INSEE

== See also ==
- Communes of the Drôme department
- Parc naturel régional du Vercors
