= Affensteine =

Long chain of deeply fissured rocks in the Elbe Sandstone Mountains

Coordinates: 50°54′40″N 14°15′20″E

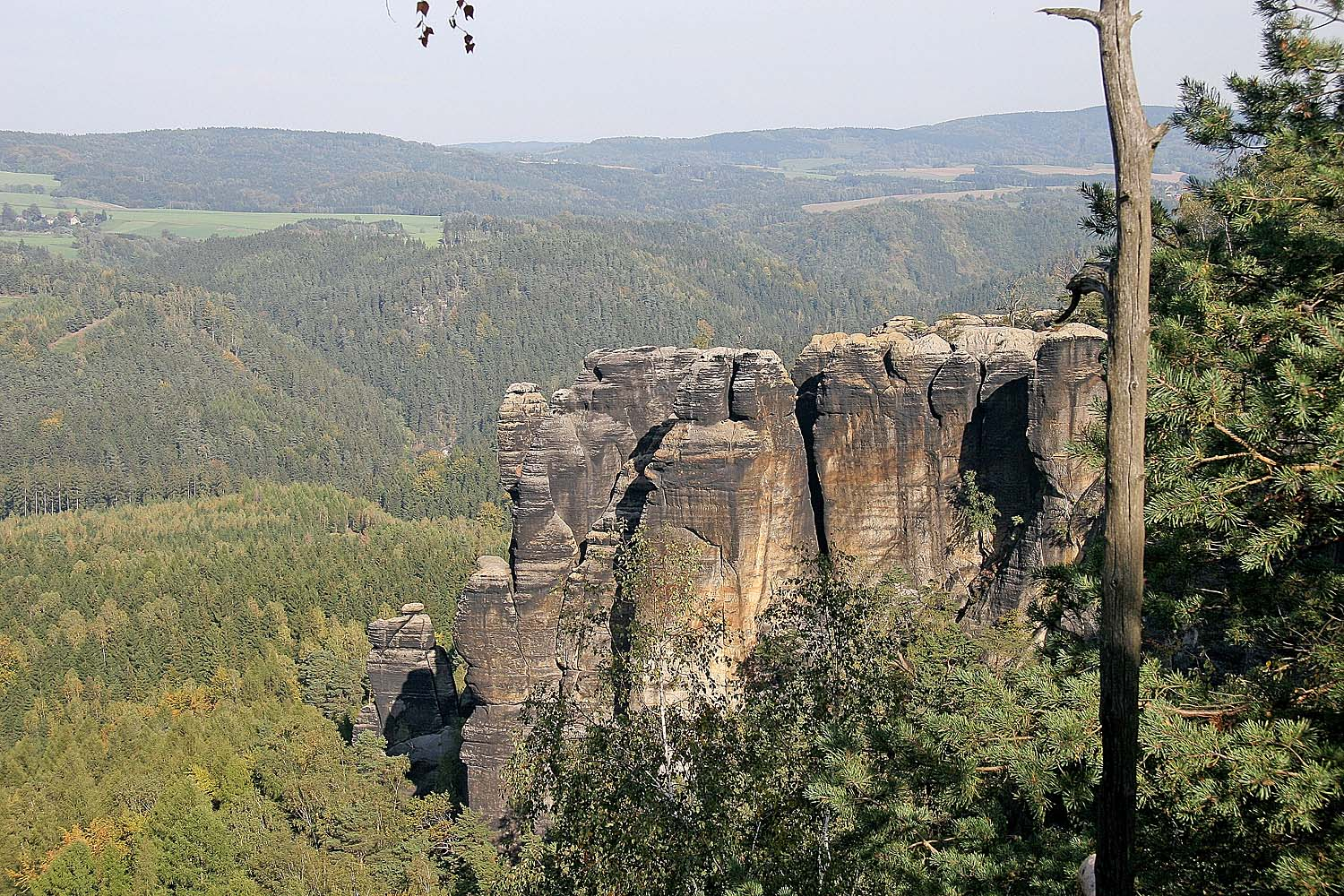
The Affensteine

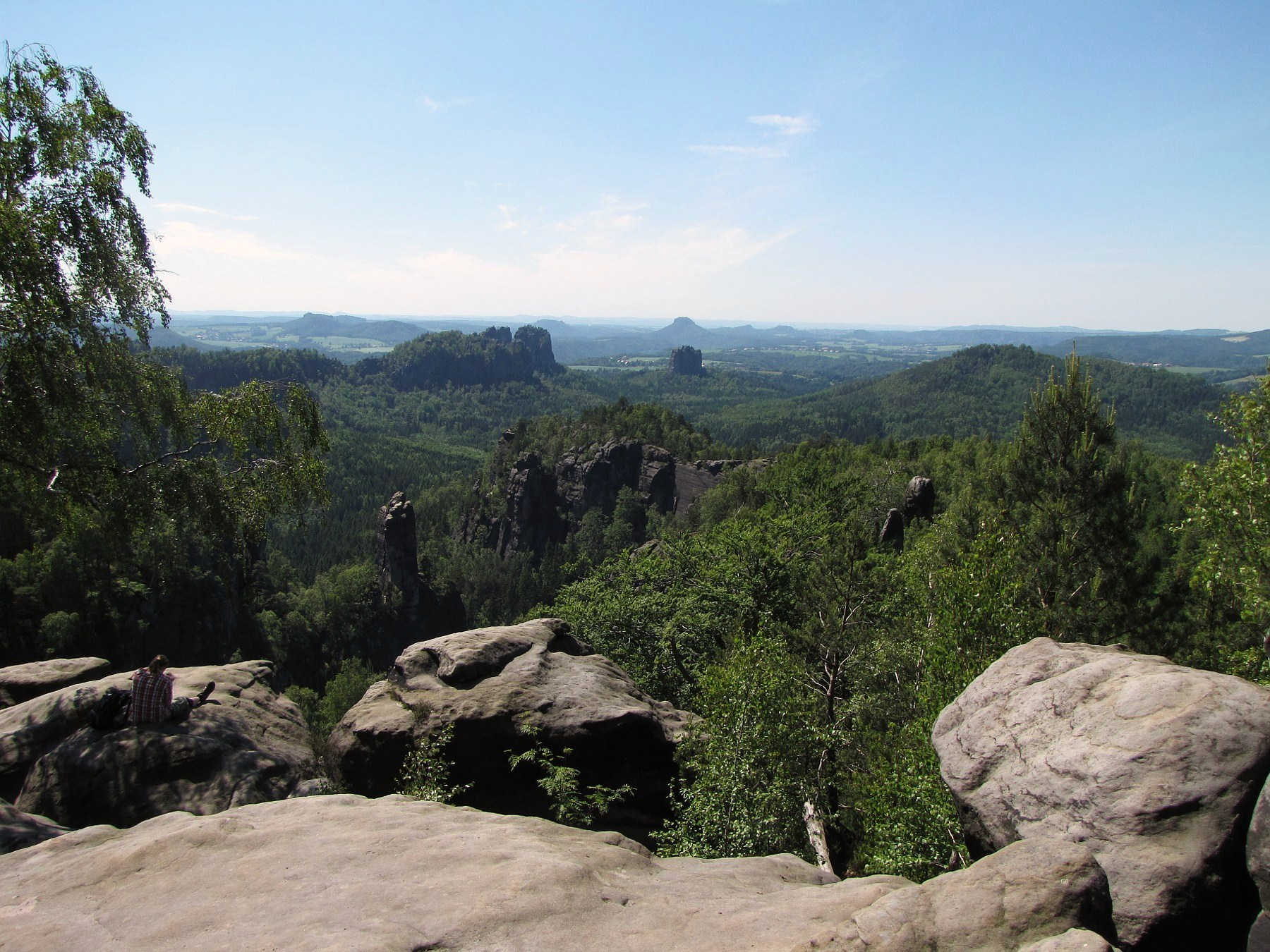
View looking west from the Carolafelsen

The Affensteine are a long chain of deeply fissured rocks in the Elbe Sandstone Mountains that are located east of Bad Schandau in the German region of Saxon Switzerland. They are bounded to the north by the Kirnitzsch valley, to the south by the Elb valley and in the east by the two Winterberg hills.

== Overview ==
The Affensteine are a very popular tourist destination. The Upper Affensteine Promenade (Obere Affensteinpromenade) is relatively level and offers splendid views over the Elbe Sandstone Mountains.

The Carola Rocks (Carolafelsen) are also popular with walkers, being one of the best-known viewing points in the Affensteine massif.

There are two theories about the origin of the name Affensteine, which literally means "monkey rocks". According to one, the name goes back to the spectacular flight of a young nobleman, who was incarcerated in the Vorderes Raubschloss, a robber knights' lair amongst the rocks. The legend has it that he had a tame monkey. The nobleman's servant tied the a rope around the monkey's body and set him climbing the steep rocks. The monkey delivered the rope, the young nobleman used it to escape and then fled to Bohemia. From there the story spread to Saxon Switzerland.

The other explanation suggests the name is derived from the fact that owls used to nest here. The old German word for owl was Auf and so the rocks became known as the Aufensteine, which changed over the years to Affensteine.

== See also ==
- Kirnitzschtal
