= Open Air (climb) =

Sport climbing route in Austria

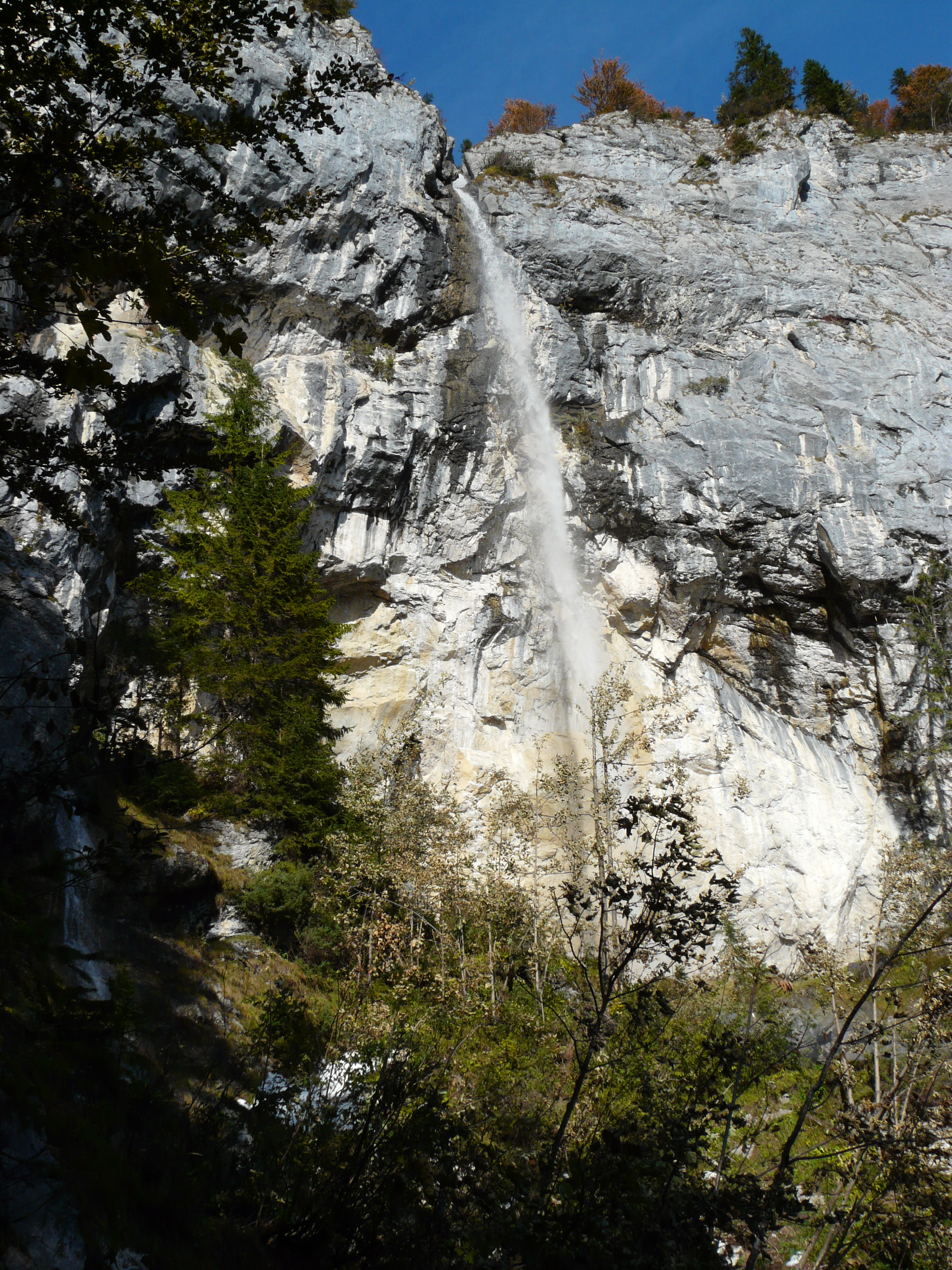
- Main Sector at Schleierfall (overhanging)

- Location within Tyrol, Austria
- Location: Schleierfall, Wilder Kaiser, Tyrol, Austria
- Coordinates: 47°32′42.9″N 12°21′42.8″E
- Climbing area: Schleierwasserfall
- Route type: Sport climbing; Overhang climbing; Face climbing
- Rock type: Limestone
- Vertical gain: 55 metres (180 ft)
- Pitches: 1
- Technical grade: 9a+ (5.15a), XI+
- Bolted by: Alexander Huber
- First free ascent: Alexander Huber, 12 June 1996
- Known for: Latterly considered the first-ever 9a+ (5.15a) in history

Open Air is a 55-metre (180 ft) sport climbing route on a limestone cliff face at the Schleierfall climbing area in the Wilder Kaiser mountains, in Tyrol, Austria. In 1996, German climber Alexander Huber made the first free ascent and after completing his redpoint, he proposed a technical grade of 9a (5.14d), which ranked it alongside the highest grades of any climbing routes at that time.

Twelve years later, in 2008, Czech climber Adam Ondra made the first repeat of Open Air and upgraded it to a 9a+ (5.15a) route. Ondra's reclassification retroactively established Huber's 1996 ascent as the first-ever ascent at 9a+ (5.15a) in climbing history, a milestone previously credited to Chris Sharma's 2001 ascent of Realization. As at May 2026, it has yet to have a third ascent.

== History ==
=== First ascent ===
In the mid-1990s, the Schleierfall climbing area became a focal point for German rock climber Alexander Huber, (Note: Huber's original German quote: "Schleierwasserfall ... das Paradies für mich ...") whose university studies at LMU Munich kept him in the Munich area. (Note: Huber's original German quote: "... Student in Müchen ... zweimal in der Woche an der Universität ...") At the time, few routes of grade 9a (5.14d) (UIAA grade XI) existed worldwide, and none at Schleierfall area. Huber targeted the development of new lines at the upper XI grade on the steeply overhanging rock dome, (Note: Huber's original German quote: "So wie es heute aussieht, gelang es mir bereits 1994 mit der Weißen Rose die Tür zum oberen elften Grad aufzustoßen. ... Noch einmal zwei Jahre später gelang mir mit Open Air eine weitere Route dieser Schwierigkeit.") which he later described as featuring "surreal lines" of unprecedented dimensions. (Note: Huber's original German quote: "... ein Land voller surrealistischer Linien, Überhänge, die ich in einer solchen Dimension noch nicht gesehen hatte, lauter Projekte, die nur darauf warteten, von mir geklettert zu werden.")

In 1994, after completing the first free ascent of Weisse Rose at 8c+ (5.14c), Huber bolted Open Air. (Note: Origian Italian: Era stata chiodata già nel 1994, stesso anno in cui lo scalatore aveva liberato Weiße Rose sempre alla medesima falesia.) In 1995, his focus temporarily shifted to big wall climbing expeditions in Yosemite Valley and the Karakoram. Returning to the Schleierfall project in 1996, Huber spent six weeks working on the route before making the first redpoint on 12 June. (Note: Huber: "I worked on the first ascent of "Open Air (XI+/9a+) for over six weeks.") Huber named it Open Air to reflect the idea that, like an open-air concert, the experience is defined by its unique setting rather than the activity alone. (Note: Huber: "Open Air" makes you think of an open-air concert. Outdoor events have something unique about them. More than the program, it's the setting that can make an open-air event an unforgettable experience. Similarly, the experience of climbing in the "open air" is also more than just the climbing itself, but is rather composed of many factors.") He stated that the overall experience was shaped by the natural beauty of the Schleierfall area and a positive social atmosphere shared with friends. (Note: Huber: "Nature is probably the most obvious building block: On a beautiful winter day, who wouldn't rather leave the fog of the valley to stand at the Schleier Waterfall and look up, squinting in the sunlight, at the play of colors in the cascading stream? And the social environment, too, determines whether or not you feel good on the rock. False ambition and resentment often create a negative atmosphere, which is not conducive to a satisfying performance. But a day on the Schleier Waterfall with my friends - what more could I ask for?")

Huber proposed a grade of 9a (5.14d), which at the time was then the limit of sport climbing grades. (Note: Original Spain: Esta vía se encuentra en Schleierwasserfall y fue cotada como 9a, que era el máximo grado que había en la época – dejando de lado el 9b propuesto por Fred Rouhling para Akira en 1995 y hoy en día decotado a 9a.) He considered Open Air to be the hardest line of his career, saying: "It was truly a difficult birth, at the very edge of my abilities, but that was also why it was so brilliant". (Note: Huber: "It was truly a difficult birth, at the very edge of my abilities, but that was also why it was so brilliant.") His proposed grading followed English climber Ben Moon's guideline that Wolfgang Güllich's famous route Action Directe served as the era's "benchmark" for the grade of 8c+ (5.14c). (Note: Sam Anderson: "In 1996, "Action Directe" was technically UIAA grade XI, equivalent to 5.14c/d. When the French system took over, it became 9a/5.14d.":)

Following his ascent of Open Air, which would be the peak of Huber's achievements in sport climbing, (Note: Huber: "It demanded not only all my strength, but also all the creativity and kinesthetic sensibility I had developed over years of high-end sport climbing. For me, it had been a journey to my absolute limit in the psychological sense. From that perspective, the two routes at the Schleier Waterfall, "Weisse Rose" and "Open Air," represent my masterwork – the legacy I have been able to bequeath to the climbing world.) he shifted his focus on big wall climbing where he would set numerous grade milestones, (Note: Original German: ... weg vom Sportklettern, das ich in den letzten Jahren bis zur Perfektion aufgebaut hatte, hin zu den großen Wänden und Bergen, was für mich eine komplett neue Welt sein würde.) transitioning into a career as a full time professional climber in 1997. (Note: "He first studied physics, then became a full-time professional mountaineer in 1997, ...")

=== First repetition and upgrade ===
It took 12 years until the first repeat of Open Air when Czech climber Adam Ondra turned his attention to the Schleierfall climbing area in late 2008. In September of that year, the 15-year-old Ondra made the second ascent of Weisse Rose, and then shifted his focus to Open Air. It took him five days and nine attempts to work out the sequences. During these attempts, Ondra chose to skip an easily reachable bolt before the main crux as clipping it would have created debilitating rope drag, feeling like an additional 10 kilograms (22 pounds) of weight pulling down during the hardest move. Skipping this bolt resulted in long falls around 15 metres (49 ft). He finally perfected the sequence and redpointed the route on 17 November 2008.

Upon reaching the top of the route, Ondra noted that his ascent was aided by "good conditions and rock friction", (Note: Original German: Ondra ... betont, dass er die ganze Zeit gute Bedingungen und gute Reibung gehabt habe.) remarking that climbing the route in summer would be "something very different". Climbing journalist Björn Pohl noted that this seasonal shift likely explained the variance with Chris Sharma's earlier assessment on the route. After a brief summer attempt on Open Air, Sharma had suspected a hold broke after the first ascent—a difference Pohl attributed to the contrast between summer heat and late-November friction.

Ondra described Open Air as the most difficult route he had climbed. He proposed upgrading the rating from 9a (5.14d) to 9a+ (5.15a), comparing it to historical benchmarks in his post-climb commentary, writing: "A bit harder than Weisse rose, so 9a+ should be appropriate I hope, when Alex Huber did it, Action Directe considered as 8c+, then 9a for this one was OK. Now when AD is 9a, this should be 9a+."

== Route ==
=== General overview ===
Open Air starts at the base of the south-facing Schleierfall cliff, located at an elevation of 1,200 metres (3,900 ft). Due to the local microclimate, extreme climbing routes are typically attempted within narrow windows in early spring and late autumn, which offers the cold and dry conditions ideal for optimal friction. Guido Unterwurzacher notes that the ideal temperature range for these conditions is between. 10 to 12 °C (50 to 54 °F) Open Air traces a path through the right side of the Main Sector (Hauptsektor) of the climbing area, which presents as an imposing, steeply overhanging rock dome featuring a massive horizontal roof. The route runs through yellow, rough rock at its start, before traversing a distinct break line along the roof. The upper section is defined by a wall of water-smoothed, grey limestone that leads directly to the anchors.

=== Section breakdown ===
In 1996, Huber described Open Air as a 55-metre (180 ft) line divided into two distinct sections: an initial 35-metre (115 ft) stretch of sustained, powerful climbing rated around 8b (5.13d), which was followed by the definitive crux—an 8B (V13) graded boulder problem on "microscopic holds, requiring highly complex and insecure body movements". (Note: Original Italian: ... ci racconta Alexander – È divisa in due parti. I primi 35 metri of frono un’arrampicata da pompare su prese abbastanza grosse e si aggira attorno all’8b. Poi arriva il punto chiave, il crux: un blocco di 8b, secondo la scala di Fontainebleau, su presine e dai movimenti aleatori.)

In 2008, Ondra described the route as "pretty boulder-heavy" and gave a breakdown of its sections. The ascent begins with a 25-metre (82 ft) bouldery start rated up to 8a+ (5.13c), which leads to the first shake-out, and which is then followed by a 15-metre (49 ft) roof section, also rated 8a+ (5.13c), which ends at a jug. From there, a boulder passage rated at approximately 7B (V8) leads to a rest. The critical test of the route is at a height of 40 metres (130 ft), and described as a "brutal boulder problem" by Ondra who gave it a boulder grade of around 8A+ (V12). Discussing this crux, Huber described the movement as a deadpoint or dyno into a "pocket that only accommodates two fingertips", (Note: Original German: Der Sprung zum nächsten Loch ist ziemlich weit. ... die linke Hand schnellt mit doppelter Geschwindigkeit zum anvisierten Griff. Im toten Punkt presse ich meine Finger in das Loch, in dem nur zwei Kuppen Platz finden .... Ich bleibe am Fels hängen ... setzte den linken Fuß und ziehe durch, durch zum ersten guten Griff.) while emphasising the crux's "extraordinary exposure" after traversing a 25-metre (82 ft) overhang. (Note: Original quote: ... 40 meters above the ground, and a 25-meter overhang. It is the dimensions of the rock dome together with the waterfall that create this extraordinary exposure.) The route finishes with vertical, technical movement leading to the anchors. Ondra graded the sections at 8a+ (5.13c), 8a+ (5.13c), 7B (V8), 8A+ (V12), followed by an "easy finish" and a "nice view of Kitzbühel".

Writing for the alpine journal bergundsteigen in 2009, Heli Kotter characterised the route as a combination of power endurance on the lower 30 metres (98 ft) that is followed by maximum-strength bouldering movements up to 8A+ (V12) near the top. (Note: Original German: Das klettertechnische Problem der Routen liegt in der harten Kombination aus Kraftausdauer und absoluter Maximalkraft – zuerst 30 Meter mindestens 8b+ ausdauernd und dann sehr schwere Boulderstellen, 8a+ bloc.)

== Legacy ==
When Huber ascended Open Air in 1996 and proposed a grade 9a (5.14d), it was the highest grade being used in the world at that time. (Note: Original Spain: Esta vía se encuentra en Schleierwasserfall y fue cotada como 9a, que era el máximo grado que había en la época – dejando de lado el 9b propuesto por Fred Rouhling para Akira en 1995 y hoy en día decotado a 9a.) Huber based his assessment on a logical progression from his 1994 ascent of Weisse Rose which he had graded at 8c+ (5.14c), noting that Open Air was notably more challenging. (Note: Original quote by Huber in 2009: "... Open Air ... is significantly more difficult than Weiße Rose or La Rambla. In my opinion, it was the most difficult sport-route in 1996.") His evaluation was rooted in the guidelines of Ben Moon, that any 9a (5.14d) route had to be significantly harder than Wolfgang Güllich's famous Action Directe, which was then rated 8c+ (5.14c). Huber later criticised what he described as a post-1995 "softening" of the old-school grading system. Huber argued that while Action Directe was eventually upgraded to become the true "benchmark" for 9a (5.14d), many modern high-end routes were graded too leniently and failed to maintain a connection to this strict historical standard. In 2018, Chris Sharma supported this view regarding the route's exceptional demands, stating that Open Air was "certainly the most difficult line in the world at the time".

Twelve years later, in November 2008, Ondra made only the second ascent of Open Air, having already redpointed eleven other routes of grade 9a (5.14d) or above. Ondra's conclusion that the route was significantly harder than other consensus 9a (5.14d) graded routes led to an upgrade to 9a+ (5.15a). With this retroactive change, the historical milestone for the world's first-ever 9a+ (5.15a) ascent shifted away from Sharma's 2001 redpoint of Realization to Huber's 1996 ascent of Open Air. Ondra concluded that Huber had to be "super strong when he sent it in 1996", and noted his "unbelievable endurance and stubbornness in trying it at the time".

In 2022, the Royal Geographical Society and the Alpine Club highlighted Open Air as "one of the hardest rock climbs in the world". Reflecting on this achievement in 2026, Brandon Pullan wrote in Canada's Gripped Magazine that while Open Air was "[o]riginally considered extremely difficult", it was "later confirmed as one of the earliest true 5.15a climbs in history", concluding that the ascent was "years ahead of its time".

As of May 2026, Open Air has received no further confirmed ascents.

== Ascents ==
- 1st. Alexander Huber on 12 June 1996
- 2nd. Adam Ondra on 17 November 2008

== See also ==
- History of rock climbing
- List of grade milestones in rock climbing
- Silence, first climb in the world with a potential grade of 9c (5.15d)
- Jumbo Love, first climb in the world with a consensus grade of 9b (5.15b)
- Action Directe, first climb in the world with a consensus grade of 9a (5.14d)
- Hubble, first climb in the world with a consensus grade of 8c+ (5.14c)

== Bibliography ==
- "Adam Ondra repite Open air". Desnivel (in Spanish). 19 November 2008. "... por Ondra en 2008, un año en el que ya ha acumulado once líneas de 9a o superior."
- Anderson, Sam (9 March 2022). "Climbing Controversy: Behind the Decades-Long Conflict Roiling the Sport's Elite". GearJunkie.
- Cicogna, Antonella; Manica, Mario, eds. (August 2021). "Una sfida tutta da raccogliere" [A challenge well worth taking up.] (PDF). Montagne360. La rivista del Club Alpino Italiano dal 1882 (in Italian): 73. "Gettando luce nella storia. Perchè il primo 9a+ al mondo sarebbe in verità Open Air, linea chiodata e liberata nel 1996 dall'altrettanto super asso Alexander Huber, classe 1968, alla falesia tirolese di Schleierwasserfall, Austria. ... Alexander Huber nella prima libera di Open Air 9a+ (12.06.1996)"
- Dubicka, Dorota (11 June 2020). "Roland Hemetzberger powtarza słynne "Qui" 9a+ Stefana Fürsta" [Roland Hemetzberger repeats Stefan Fürst’s famous “Qui” (9a+).]. wspinanie.pl (in Polish). "... Alex Huber otwierał w Schleierwasserfall Open Air 9a+ [uważaną dziś za pierwsze 9a+, oryginalnie wyceniona na 9a], także powtórzoną po wielu latach, i także przez Adama Ondrę [2008 r.]."
- "'Flex Luthor', 'Open air' y 'Hubble': tres historias de recotaciones" [‘Flex Luthor’, ‘Open Air’, and ‘Hubble’: Three Stories of upgrading]. Desnivel (in Spanish). 14 October 2021.
- Huber, Alexander. "Der 11. Grad: 1996, Open Air" [UIAA grade XI: 1996, Open Air]. huberbuam.de.
- Huber, Alexander (2009). The mountain within: the true story of the most extreme free-ascent alpine climber in the world. New York City: Skyhorse Publishing. ISBN 978-1-60239-988-4 – via Internet Archive.
  - Huber, Alexander (25 September 2012). Der Berg in mir: Klettern am Limit [The mountain within: the true story of the most extreme free-ascent alpine climber in the world] (in German). Piper ebooks. ISBN 978-3-492-95630-7.
- Huber, Alexander; Huber, Thomas (2000). Messner, Reinhold (ed.). The Wall: die neue Dimension des Kletterns [The Wall: a new dimension of climbing] (in German). München, Wien, Zürich: BLV Verlag. p. 49. ISBN 978-3-405-15685-5.
- "Adam Ondra, Open Air and Hotel Supramonte". PlanetMountain.com. November 2008.
- Jourdain, Philippe (20 October 2020). "L'histoire de l'escalade 10/10 : l'évolution des cotations" [The History of Climbing 10/10: The Evolution of Grading Systems]. www.grimper.com (in French). "1996: Premier 9a+. Alex Huber - "Open air" (Schleierwasserfall - AUT)"
- Kern, Steffen (19 November 2008). "Adam Ondra punktet "Open Air" (9a+)". www.klettern.de (in German). Archived from the original on 23 September 2015.
- Klettern am Schleierwasserfall mit Guido Unterwurzacher [Climbing at the Schleierfall with Guido Unterwurzacher]. ServusTV. 4 October 2012. Event occurs at 2:14 – via YouTube.
- Kotter, Heli (2009). "Der Schleierwasserfall und der 11. Grad" [The Schleierfall and the 11th grade] (PDF). bergundsteigen (in German). 3: 26. "Somit hat Alexander Huber aber bereits 1996 die erste 9a+ weltweit geklettert."
- MacDonald, Dougald (15 June 2012). "Groundbreaking 5.15 Gets Second Ascent". Climbing.
- "Ondra repeats Open air, 9a+!". www.8a.nu. 18 November 2008.
- "Open Air 9a+". Bergsteigen.com (in German). 25 November 2008.
- "Open Air 9a+". climbing-history.org.
- Pohl, Björn (14 April 2009). "The state of the 9th grade". www.ukclimbing.com.
- Pullan, Brandon (22 May 2026). "Alexander Huber Climbs New 10-Pitch 5.13d in Austria". Gripped Magazine.
- Randall, Tom (12 February 2022). "History Of Climbing: With Peter Beal". Lattice Training. "1996 – Open Air by Huber as the first 9a+ (upgraded later from 9a)"
- Royal Geographical Society, Alpine Club (1 December 2022). Mountaineers: Great tales of bravery and conquest. London: Dorling Kindersley Limited. p. 341. ISBN 978-0-241-41014-1. "... Alex has gone even harder, with Open Air at Austria's Schleierwasserfall, now graded 9a+, and one of the hardest rock climbs in the world."
- "Schleierwasserfall – Hauptsektor, rechter Teil" [Schleier Waterfall – Main Sector, right section]. Topos Schleierwasserfall Going – Wilder Kaiser (in German). Going am Wilden Kaiser: Tourismusverband Wilder Kaiser. 4 April 2013. pp. 6–7 – via Yumpu. "Open Air, No. 58"
- Sharma, Chris (1 September 2018). "The 2010s. A lifetime of climbing by Chris Sharma". Vantage Point: 50 Years of the Best Climbing Stories Ever Told. The editors of Climbing Magazine. Essex, Connecticut: Globe Pequot Press. p. 200. ISBN 978-1-4930-3478-9. "(Alex Huber's Open Air (1996) at Austria's Schleierwasserfall could also be the world's first 5.15; it's debatable. It was certainly the most difficult line in the world at the time.)"
- Stadler, Markus [in German] (24 February 2024). "Schleierwasserfall". www.stadler-markus.de (in German).
- Ulmonova, Simona (21 November 2008). "Interview with Adam Ondra, Open Air 9a+". Czech Climbing. Translated by Sika, Jiri; Burgoon, Andrew.
- "Huber talks history and old-school-grading". www.8a.nu. 22 November 2010.
- Zak, Heinz [in German] (1996). "Alexander Huber on the crux move of "Open Air", 9a+, 1996 Schleierwasserfall, Austria". PlanetMountain.com.
