= Alexander Huber =

German rock climber

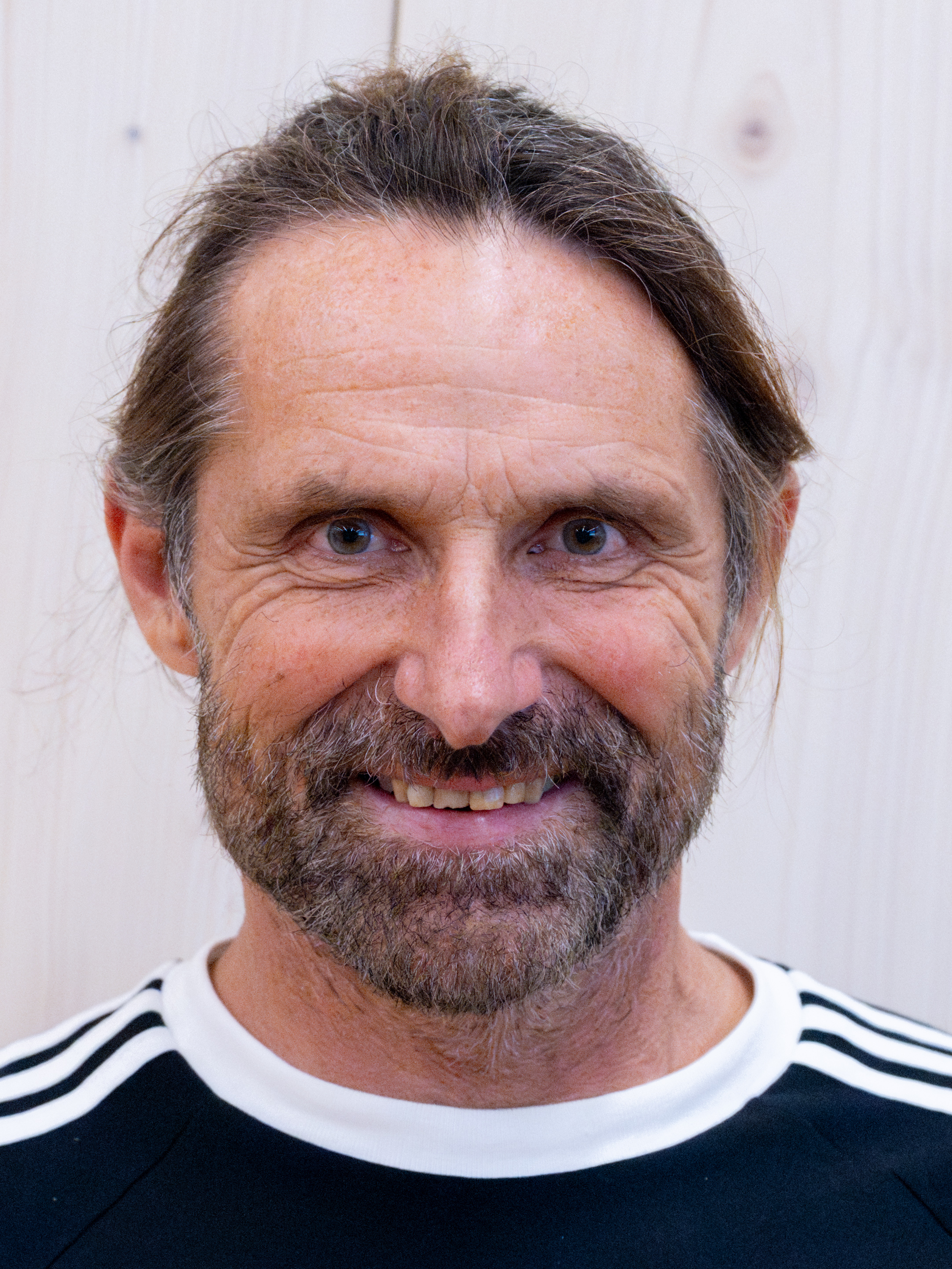
- Huber in 2025

Personal information
- Born: 30 December 1968 (age 57) Trostberg, Bavaria, West Germany
- Education: LMU Munich (Physics)
- Occupations: Theoretical physicist, professional rock climber, and mountain guide
- Height: 176 cm (5 ft 9 in)
- Weight: 62 kg (137 lb) (sport climbing)
- Spouse: Kristina Huber
- Relative: Thomas Huber (brother)
- Website: www.huberbuam.de

Climbing career
- Type of climber: Sport climbing; Traditional climbing; Free solo climbing; Big wall climbing
- Highest grade: Redpoint: 9a+ (5.15a); Onsight/Flash: 7c+ (5.13a); Free solo: 8b+ (5.14a)
- First ascents: Om (9a/5.14d, 1992); Weisse Rose (9a/5.14d, 1994); Open Air (9a+/5.15a, 1996); Tsering Mosong (VII 5.10c A3, west face Latok II, 1997); El Nino (5.13c/A0, 1998); Freerider (5.12d, 1998); Bellavista (8c, 2001); Zodiac (5.13d, 2003); Voie Petit (8b, 2005); Pan Aroma (8c, 2007); Eternal Flame (5.13a, 2009)
- Known for: First to redpoint at grade 9a+ (5.15a), second to redpoint at 9a (5.14d); First to redpoint a big wall at grade 8a (5.13b), and at grade 8c (5.14b); First to free solo 8b+ (5.14a), second to free solo 8b (5.13d); First to free solo a big wall at grade 7a+ (5.12a); First individual free ascent of the Salathé Wall (1995); First free solo of the Brandler-Hasse Direttissima (2002)
- Updated on 17 July 2023

Alexander Huber (born 30 December 1968) is a German rock climber who is considered one of the greatest and most influential climbers in the history of the sport. He came to prominence in the early 1990s as the world's strongest sport climber after the passing of Wolfgang Güllich. He is the second-ever person to redpoint a 9a (5.14d) graded route by ascending Om in 1992, and has come to be known as the first-ever person to redpoint a 9a+ (5.15a) route from his 1996 ascent of Open Air.

In the decade following the mid-1990s, Huber, often partnered with his brother Thomas, also came to be regarded as the strongest big wall free climber of his generation, with groundbreaking first ascents in Yosemite (El Nino in 1998, and Zodiac in 2003), the Karakoram (Latok II in 1997, and Eternal Flame in 2009). Huber's 1995 ascent of the Salathé Wall in Yosemite was the first-ever complete redpoint of an 8a (5.13b) graded big wall in history. His 2001 ascent of Bellavista in the Dolomites was the first-ever redpoint of an 8c (5.14b) graded big wall in history.

Huber is also known as one of the greatest free-solo climbers for both big-wall and sport-climbing routes. In 2002, he free soloed the first-ever grade 7a+ (5.12a) big wall in history, the 580-metre Brandler-Hasse Direttissima in the Dolomites. In 2003, he free soloed the second-ever grade 8b (5.13d) sport-climbing route with Der Opportunist in Austria, and in 2004, he became the first-ever person to free solo an 8b+ (5.14a) graded sport route with Kommunist, also in Austria.

== Early life and education ==
Huber was born in Trostberg in Bavaria, the second of three children. His father Thomas, a climber who had ascended the north face of Les Droites, and his mother Maria, took the children mountaineering from a young age. By 1986, aged 18, Huber and his brother Thomas had climbed Utopia (VIII+, 7a+) on the Wartsteinwand, and in 1988, they ascended Vom Winde Verweht (X−, 8a+) on Scharnstein in the Berchtesgaden Alps.

By 1992, Huber trained as a fully qualified UIAGM mountain guide. In 1997, Huber graduated with a Master's in Physics and received a post-graduate position as an assistant at the Institute for Theoretical Meteorology at LMU Munich. In 1998, Huber decided to become a full-time professional climber, one year after Thomas; the pair are known as the "Huberbuam" (Huberboys).

== Climbing career ==
=== Sport climbing ===
Huber came to prominence as a sport climber in the early 1990s, at a time when Wolfgang Gullich was considered the world's strongest sport climber. Huber attributes the initial conservative 8c+ (5.14c) grading of Gullich's famous 1991 route, Action Directe, which persisted for many years until it was eventually shown to be a "hard 9a", for suppressing the grades of Huber's own routes such as Om, Weisse Rose, and La Rambla. In 2008, when Adam Ondra made the first repeat of Huber's 1996 route Open Air and graded it 9a+ (5.15a), that the climbing media began to realize that Huber was probably the first-ever person to climb at that grade, several years before Chris Sharma's groundbreaking ascent of Realization in 2001. Huber felt that Open Air was his limit, and he decided to focus on big wall climbing.

=== Big wall climbing ===
From the mid-1990s onwards, Huber (often partnered with Thomas), began to focus almost exclusively on big wall climbing in which he would become one of the most important big wall free climbers in history. In 1995, Huber became the first person to lead all 36-pitches of the Salathé Wall, and thus became the first-ever person to redpoint a big wall route at the grade of 8a (5.13b). Over the following decade, Huber made the first free ascent (or partial free ascent with minor aid), some of the most iconic big wall routes in Yosemite, including El Nino (5.13c A0, 1998), Golden Gate (5.13a, 2000), El Corazon (5.13b, 2001), and Zodiac (5.13d, 2003). Huber's most famous Yosemite route was his easiest, his 1998 ascent of Freerider (5.12d/5.13a), a route which is only second in popularity to The Nose. The Huber brothers set several Yosemite speed records including a speed record for The Nose of 2:45.45, in 2007.

In 2001, Huber made the first free ascent of Bellavista through the huge roofs of the north face of Cima Ovest in the Dolomites (the birthplace of big wall climbing), which was the world's first-ever big wall route at the grade 8c (5.14b). In 2005, Huber freed the famous Voie Petit, the hardest big wall route in the French Alps at the time at 8b (5.13d), and in 2007, he returned to the Cima Ovest to free the route Pan Aroma, also at 8c (5.14b). During this period, Huber also made important big wall ascents in the Karakoram (Tsering Mosong on Latok II, 1997), in Patagonia (Golden Eagle in 2006 and El Bastardo in 2008, on Fitz Roy), in Antarctica (Sound of Silence on Ulvetanna Peak, 2008), and on Baffin Island (Bavarian Direct on Mount Asgard, 2012). In 2009, Huber and his brother Thomas freed the famous high-altitude big wall route, Eternal Flame (5.13a), on the Nameless Tower in Pakistan.

=== Free solo climbing ===
Huber has made some of the most important free solo climbing ascents in history. In 2002, Huber free soloed at 17-pitches of the 580-metre Brandler-Hasse Direttissima (5.12a) on the Cima Grande in the Dolomites, which was the first-ever free solo of a 7a+ (5.12a) graded big wall route in history. In 2003, he free soloed the sport climbing route, Der Opportunist in Austria, which was only the second-ever free solo of an 8b (5.13d) graded route in history. In 2004, Huber free soloed Kommunist in Austria, which was the first-ever free solo of an 8b+ (5.14a) graded route in history; Huber called this solo a "search for my limits". Huber said that after his 2008 free solo of the multi-pitch 280-metre route Locker Vom Hocker 7a+ (5.12a), he largely stopped doing free solo climbs at very extreme grades saying: "You mustn't forget that free soloing is very, very risky indeed. Even for the best climbers who seemingly have everything under control".

== Notable climbs ==
=== Sport climbing ===
Huber was considered one of the world's best sport climbers.

- 1991 – Shogun 8c (5.14b), Karlstein, Bavaria, first ascent, and Huber's first grade 8c (5.14b).
- 1992 – Om 9a (5.14d), Triangel, Bavaria, first ascent, and second-ever 9a (5.14d) in history.
- 1994 – Weisse Rose 9a (5.14d), Schleierwasserfall, Austria, first ascent.
- 1994 – La Rambla (35-metre version) 8c+ (5.14c), Siurana, Spain. first ascent; the route was extended to 40-metres and graded 9a+ (5.15a) in 2003; Huber maintains his original route was the same difficulty.
- 1996 – Open Air 9a+ (5.15a), Schleierwasserfall, Austria, first ascent; in 2008, Adam Ondra made the first repeat and proposed 9a+ (5.15a), making Open Air the first 9a+ in history (several years before Chris Sharma's Realization).

=== Big wall climbing ===
For a period in the late 1990s, Huber dominated big wall free climbing in Yosemite Valley, as well as in the Alps:

- 1995 – Salathé Wall (5.13b, VI, 36-pitches), El Capitan, Yosemite, first-ever redpoint at the grade (Skinner and Piana co-led the FFA in 1988).
- 1998 – El Nino (5.13c, VI, A0, 30-pitches), El Capitan, first (almost free) ascent bar a down-abseil on pitch-13 (A0); was the third route to be freed on El Capitan and the first on the North America Wall. In 2019, Sonnie Trotter avoided the down-abseil to create the Pineapple Express.
- 1998 – Freerider (5.12d/5,13a, VI, 30-pitches), El Capitan, first free ascent, and in 15:25 was the first El Capitan route inside 24 hrs. Huber discovered it on the Salathe; it became a classic that Huber called the "Astroman of the new millennium"; free soloed by Alex Honnold 2017.
- 2000 – Golden Gate (5.13a, VI, 41-pitches), El Capitan, first free ascent; a combination of the Salathé Wall and Heart Route.
- 2001 – Bellavista 8c (5.14b) (10-pitches, 500-metres), on the Cima Ovest, Dolomites, Italy, first free ascent through the huge roof; first-ever big wall route at 8c; Huber later discovered subsequent climbers had "treated" some holds to soften grade.
- 2001 – El Corazon (5.13b, 35-pitches), El Capitan, first free ascent; combination of Salathé Wall, Albatross, Son of Heart and Heart Route.
- 2003 – Free Zodiac (5.13d, VI, 16-pitches), El Capitan, first free ascent of the overhanging 1972 aid route; with the famous "Nipple pitch".
- 2004 – Zodiac (5.8, A2+, 16-pitches), El Capitan, speed record on the 1972 aid climbing version of Zodiac in 1:51:34 (fastest route on El Capitan).
- 2005 – Voie Petit 8b (5.13d) (16-pitches, 450-metres), on Grand Capucin, Mont Blanc, first free ascent of famous 1997 Arnaud Petit route.
- 2007 – Pan Aroma 8c (5.14b) (9-pitches, 450-metres), the Cima Ovest, first free ascent; starts per Bellavista but breaches Bauer's roof.
- 2007 – The Nose (5.9, A1), El Capitan, Yosemite, speed record with Thomas Huber on the aid climbing version of The Nose in 2:45:45.
- 2008 – Sansara (6-pitch, 200-metres, east face Grubhorn), and Feuertaufe (7-pitches, 250-metres, south face Sonnwand), FFAs at 8b+ (5.14a).
- 2012 – Nirwana 8c+ (5.14c) (200-metres), Sonnwendwand, Austria, first free ascent of one of the hardest multi-pitch rock climbs in the world.

=== High-altitude climbing ===
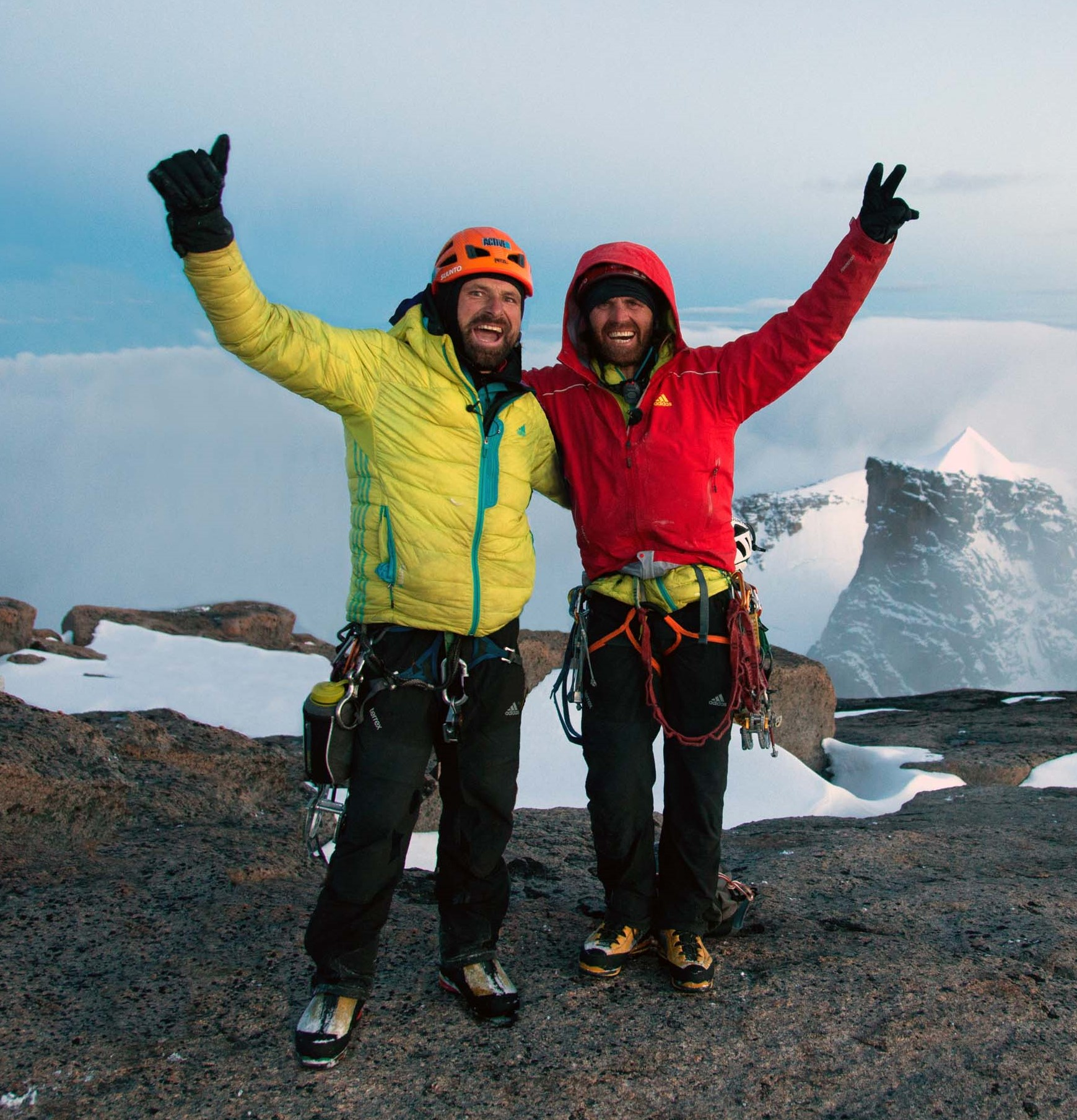
Alexander and Thomas on the summit of Mount Asgard, 2012

Huber took part in several expeditions to famous big wall climbing locations including the high-altitude walls of Trango Tower, the stormy towers of Patagonia, and the extreme-cold of Ulvetanna in Antarctica; climbing usually with his brother Thomas, but also often part of a larger climbing team in an alpine style approach:

- 1997 – Tsering Mosong (VII 5.10c A3, 26-pitches), on the 1,000-metre west face of Latok II, Karakoram (starts at 6,100-metres), first ascent with Thomas Huber, Conrad Anker and Toni Gutsch.
- 1998 – Tichy Route, northwest ridge of Cho Oyu (8,188-metres), Himalaya, Nepal, Huber climbed the eight thousander by the "standard route" to understand effects of extreme altitude.
- 2002 – In Patagonia, ascends: Cerro Torre (via Compressor Route, V A1), Fitz Roy (via Franco-Argentina, VII), and later Cerro Standhardt (via Exocet, 6b, winter ascent); in 2008, Torre Egger.
- 2006 – Golden Eagle (5.11, V, A1, 800-metres), southwest face Aguja Desmochada, Fitzroy, first ascent.
- 2008 – El Bastardo (5.11, V, A1, 500-metres), south face Aguja de la Silla, Fitzroy, Patagonia, first ascent.
- 2008 – Eiszeit (VII+, A4, 24-pitches, 750-metres), west face, and Skywalk (VII−, 10-pitches, 450-metres), north pillar of Holtanna, both first ascents, in Antarctica.
- 2008 – Sound of Silence (VIII-, 5.11a, A2, 20-pitches, 800-metres) on the west pillar of Ulvetanna, in Antarctica, first ascent.
- 2009 – Eternal Flame (5.13a, 24-pitches, 650-metres), Nameless Tower, Pakistan, FFA of the historic 1989 Güllich, Albert et al. route.
- 2012 – Bavarian Direct (5.13b, 28-pitches, 700-metres), on Mount Asgard, Canada, first free ascent of the 1997 aid climb with Thomas Huber.

=== Free solo rock climbing ===
Huber was one of the few climbers to free solo extreme grades in both single-pitch and big wall routes.

- 2002 – Brandler-Hasse Direttissima (5.12a, 17-pitches, 580-metres) of Cima Grande, Dolomites; the first-ever big wall solo at grade 7a+ (5.12a).
- 2003 – Der Opportunist 8b (5.13d) (18-metres), Schleierfall, Austria; the second-ever free solo of an 8b (5.13d) graded route.
- 2004 – Kommunist 8b+ (5.14a) (22-metres), Tyrol, Austria; the first-ever free solo of an 8b+ (5.14a) graded route; Huber found his "limit".
- 2004 – Mescalito 8a (5.13b) (20-metres), Karlstein, Drugwall, Germany, first free solo of route; Huber found it his scariest solo (starts at 50m).
- 2006 – South Face of Dent du Géant 5.11b (6c) (200-metres), Mont Blanc; first free solo of the route.
- 2008 – Swiss Route (up and down) on Grand Capucin 5.10d (6b+) (400-metres), Mont Blanc; first free solo, which Huber also downclimbed.
- 2008 – Locker Vom Hocker 7a+ (5.12a) (8-pitches, 280-metres), Schüsselkarspitze, Germany; Huber's last extreme-level free solo.
- 2009 – Tour Muriciana 6c (5.11a/b) (8-pitches, 285-metres), on Mallo Pison, Mallos de Riglos, Spain; first free solo of the route.

== Bibliography ==
- Huber, Alexander; Huber, Thomas (2001). The Wall: A New Dimension in Climbing (English ed.). David & Charles. ISBN 978-0715311783.
- Huber, Alexander; Zak, Heinz (2002). Yosemite: Half a century of dynamic rock climbing (1st ed.). Bergverlag Rother. ISBN 978-3-7633-7511-0.
- Huber, Alexander; Schwenkmeier, Willi (2004). Drei Zinnen (Three Peaks) (1st ed.). Bergverlag Rother. ISBN 978-3-7633-7513-4.
- Huber, Alexander (2009). Free Solo (1st ed.). Bergverlag Rother. ISBN 978-3-8354-0594-3.
- Huber, Alexander (2010). The Mountain Within (Der Berg in mir) (English ed.). Skyhorse Publishing. ISBN 978-1-60239-988-4.
- Huber, Alexander; Huber, Thomas (2011). Eiszeit (Ice Age) (1st ed.). Frederking & Thaler. ISBN 978-3-89405-775-6.
- Huber, Alexander; Mailänder, Nicholas (2011). Der Weg nach draußen (The Way Out) (1st ed.). Berg & Tal. ISBN 978-3-939499-11-4.
- Huber, Alexander (2013). Die Angst, dein bester Freund (The Fear, your best friend) (1st ed.). Ecowin Verlag. ISBN 978-3-7110-5090-8.

== Filmography ==
- Speed climbing The Nose: Pepe Danquart (Director) (2007). To the Limit (Motion picture). Hager Moss Film. ASIN B001CP1UMY.

== See also ==
- List of grade milestones in rock climbing
- History of rock climbing
- Barbara Zangerl, Austrian female big wall climber
