= Babsi Zangerl =

Austrian rock climber (born 1988)

Barbara Zangerl
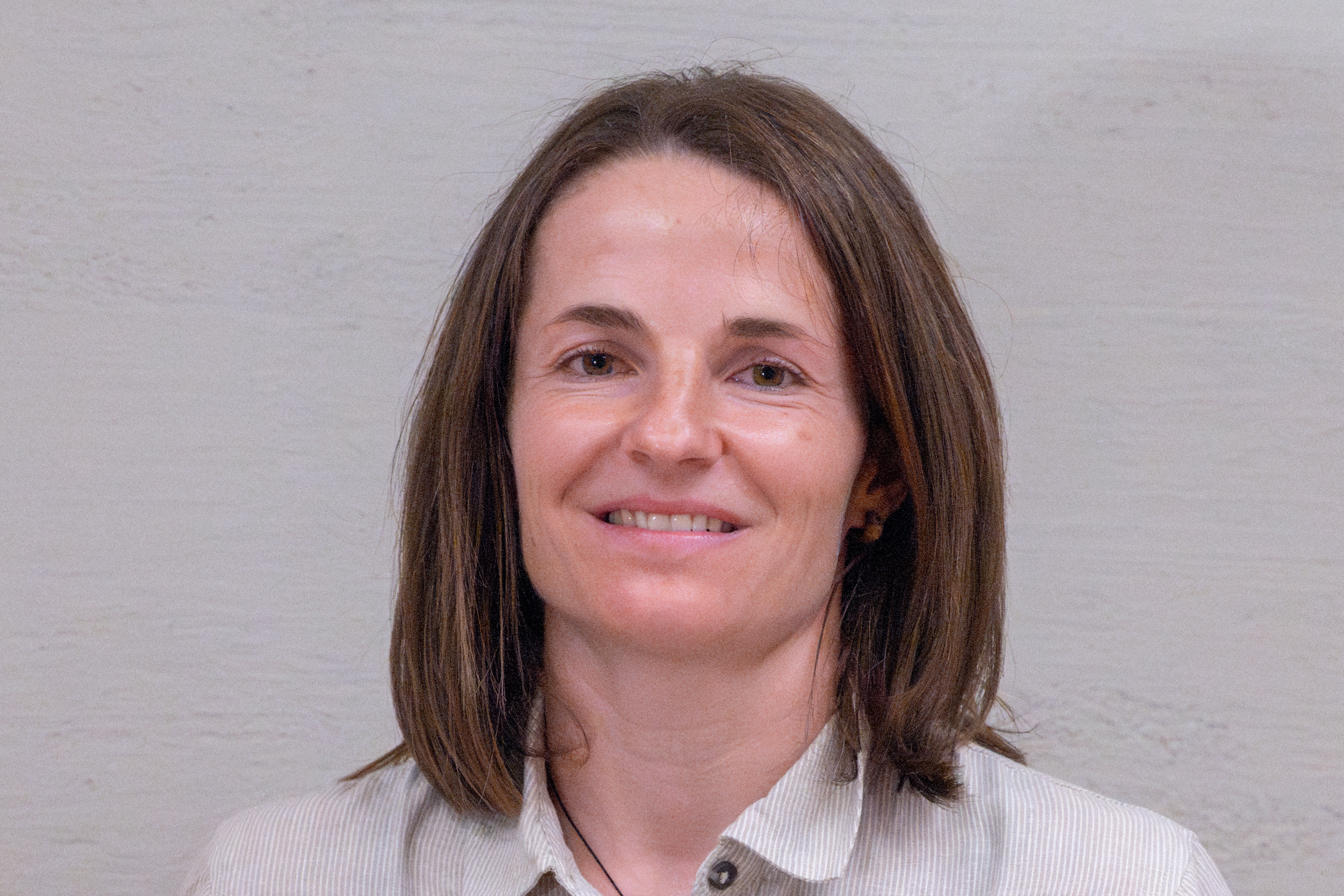
- Barbara Zangerl in 2025

Personal information
- Born: 24 May 1988 (age 38) Tyrol, Austria
- Occupations: Professional rock climber Medical radiographer
- Height: 162 cm (5 ft 4 in)
- Weight: 54 kg (119 lb)
- Website: barbara-zangerl.at

Climbing career
- Type of climber: Bouldering; Sport climbing; Multi-pitch climbing; Big wall climbing; Traditional climbing
- Ape index: -2cm (-0.78 in)
- Highest grade: Redpoint: 9a+ (5.15a); Onsight/Flash: 8b (5.13d); Bouldering: 8A+/8B (V12/V13)
- First ascents: Gondo Crack 5.14b (8c), 2017
- Known for: First-ever female to solve 8A+/8B boulders; FFFA of the Alpine Trilogy; FFFA of several major El Capitan big wall routes; FFFA of several hardest traditional climbing routes; FFFA of Eternal Flame
Medal record
Women's competition bouldering
Representing Austria
Melloblocco
Winner	2006	Bouldering
Winner	2008	Bouldering
Winner	2011	Bouldering
Winner	2013	Bouldering
- Updated on 5 April 2024

Barbara Zangerl (born 24 May 1988) is an Austrian rock climber who is considered one of the best all-round climbers in the world. At various stages in her career, she has climbed at–or just below–the highest grades achieved by a female in every major rock climbing discipline, including bouldering, traditional climbing, sport climbing, multi-pitch climbing and big wall climbing.

She was the first female to climb an 8A+/8B (V12/13) graded boulder route with Pura Vida in 2008, and has repeated some of the hardest traditional climbing routes in the world, including Meltdown in 2023, which at 8c+ (5.14c) was the hardest traditional climbing grade by a female climber. Zangerl has redpointed sport climbing routes up to the grade of 9a+ (5.15a) with her ascent of Bombardino 2025.

Zangerl has made the first female free ascent (FFFA) of several notable multi-pitch and big wall climbing routes including the Alpine Trilogy in 2013, three routes on El Capitan (El Nino in 2015, Zodiac in 2015, and Magic Mushroom in 2016), the Eiger's hardest route, Odyssee, in 2018, and one of the hardest high-altitude big wall routes, Eternal Flame on the Nameless Tower in Pakistan, in 2022. Zangerl became the first person in history to flash a route on El Capitan (Freerider in 2024).

In 2019, she was named as the National Geographic 'Adventurer of the Year'. She is also known for her climbing partnership with Italian rock climber Jacopo Larcher.

== Early life ==
Zangerl was born and raised in the small village of Strengen in the Austrian Tyrol. Her parents would regularly bring their five children hiking and skiing in the surrounding mountains. When she was 14 years old, her brother brought her and her 16-year-old sister Claudia to the climbing gym in the neighboring village of Flirsch am Arlberg, where she became hooked on the sport. Austrian climber Bernd Zangerl–no relation—introduced the girls to climbing on natural rock, and to bouldering in particular.

== Climbing career ==
=== Bouldering ===
Focusing initially on bouldering, in 2005, Zangerl climbed her first 8A (V11) graded problem with her ascent of X-Ray in Silvretta in Austria. In 2008, aged only 19, she climbed Pura Vida in Switzerland's Magic Wood. At the time, the highest bouldering grade climbed by a female climber was 8A+ (V12), and Pura Vida was considered at least 8A+/B and possibly 8B. While the first-ever full 8B (V13) graded boulder to be climbed by a female is regarded as Angie Payne's 2010 ascent of Automator, Zangerl's 2008 ascent of Pura Vida is regarded as being the hardest boulder climbed by a female climber at that time.

Zangerl largely avoided the full competition bouldering circuit but did enter the annual international bouldering competition of Melloblocco, which she won four times in 2006, 2008, 2011, and 2013. After suffering a herniated L5-S1 disk in her lower back in 2009, she was forced to largely abandon bouldering for a few years and focus on types of climbing that created fewer direct strains on her back.

=== Sport climbing ===
After retiring from bouldering and taking time off in 2009 to allow her back to recover, Zangerl began to focus on easier sport climbing routes. While single pitch sport climbing never became a core focus for Zangerl, by 2018 she was climbing at the grade of 9a (5.14d) when the highest achieved female sport climbing grade was just two notches higher at 9b (5.15b). Zangerl made the first female free ascent (FFFA) of several notable sport routes including Speed Integrale (9a, 2018), Everything is Karate (8c+/9a, 2019), and Sprengstoff (9a, 2021). Zangerl has the first free ascent (FFA) of her own single-pitch routes including Gondo Crack 8c (5.14b) in 2017 (which she "greenpointed" as a traditional route).

=== Traditional climbing ===
Zangerl's first traditional climbing route was Super Krill 5.13b (8a) in 2012. By 2014, she had made the FFFA of Beat Kammerlander's Prinzip Hoffnung at 5.14 R 8b/+ E9/E10, which was one of the hardest traditional routes at the time. Over the next few years, Zangerl made the FFFA of several notable traditional testpieces including Dave MacLeod's Achemine E9 6c 8b (2016), Sonnie Trotter's The Path 5.14a (8b+) R (2018), and Didier Berthod's Greenspit 5.14a (8b+) R (2020). In 2023, she made the fourth-ever ascent of Beth Rodden's Meltdown in Yosemite, which at 8c+ (5.14c) was still the hardest traditional grade achieved by a female, and one notch behind the hardest traditional grade of 9a (5.14d).

=== Big wall climbing ===
Zangerl focused much of her time on big wall climbing in both traditional and sport climbing formats, frequently with her partner Jacopo Larcher. On big wall routes, they alternate leading the easier sections, but both individually lead all of the difficult pitches.

In 2013, Zangerl became the first-ever female, and only the fourth-ever person, to complete the Alpine Trilogy of extreme multi-pitch sport climbing alpine routes, that include Des Kaisers neue Kleider 8b+ (5.14a) (2013), Silbergeier 8b+ (5.14a) (2013), and The End of Silence (2012). In 2015, Zangerl followed it up with the second-ever female ascent of Alexander Huber's Bellavista 8b+ (5.14a), and the joint-FFFA, with Nina Caprez, of Beat Kammerlander's Die Unendliche Geschichte (The Neverending Story) 5.14a (8b+).

From 2015, Zangerl, climbing with partner Larcher, made the FFFA of several major big wall routes on El Capitan including El Nino 5.13c (8a+) (2015), Zodiac 5.13d (8b) (2016), and Magic Mushroom 5.14a (8b+) (2017). At the time of their ascent, Magic Mushroom was El Capitan's hardest route after The Dawn Wall, and their ascent was the first repeat of the route after Tommy Caldwell had made the FFA in 2008.

In 2018, Zangerl and Larcher moved into big wall alpine climbing routes making the first repeat of the Eiger's hardest route, Odyssee at 5.13c (8a+). In 2020, they returned to make the first one-day ascent of the route, taking under 16 hours. In 2022, the pair ventured into high-altitude big-wall climbing on the Trango Towers, when they made only the third free ascent, and Zangerl the FFFA, of the historic high-altitude big wall route, Eternal Flame 7c+ (5.13a), on the Nameless Tower in Pakistan, where the crux is at over 6,000 metres (20,000 ft).

== Legacy ==
As a result of her achievements across the rock climbing disciplines of bouldering, traditional climbing, sport climbing, multi-pitch climbing and big wall climbing, Zangerl is widely considered one of the world's strongest "all-round" female climbers. She is noted for climbing at, or just below, the highest climbing grades being achieved by female rock climbers in each discipline, at various stages in her career.

In 2019, National Geographic said: "Zangerl is Austrian, extremely humble, and carries an air of the girl-next-door. Her low-key nature, however, belies her reputation among her peers as the best all-around female climber in the world". Czech climber Adam Ondra said of Zangerl: "It is extremely difficult to find climbers who are achieving in so many different disciplines, and among female climbers it is even more rare," and "Babsi is definitely one of the best all-around female climbers, if not the very best". American climber Alex Honnold said: "I can't really think of any other women climbing at such a high level in so many different disciplines," and "She's such an unassuming 'world's best.' She's so mellow that it's hard to think of her as 'the best,' which is a good thing". In 2021, PlanetMountain called her "One of the great all-round climbers of our time". In 2022, Climbing said of her "The Austrian Barbara “Babsi” Zangerl has ticked V13, 5.14d sport, 5.14 trad, the Alpine Trilogy of 5.14-, multi-pitch, high-altitude free climbs, and some of the hardest free routes on El Capitan, making her one of the best, most versatile climbers in the world".

Flashed is a documentary about Zangerl becoming the first person in history to successfully flash a route on El Capitan, which she did in 2024.

== Personal life ==
For much of her professional climbing career, Zangerl has also held a part-time job as an assistant medical radiographer in a hospital in Bludenz in Austria. She began her studies as a radiographer while recovering from her back injury in 2009.

Since 2013, Zangerl has been in a relationship with Italian climber Jacopo Larcher, and the pair have been regular climbing partners since then. In 2019, Zangerl told National Geographic about her relationship with Larcher: "We're a good team," and "It's easy for us to handle stress on the wall because there's always something to do. At home, though, it's a little different," she says with a laugh".

== Awards ==
- In 2019, Zangerl was named a National Geographic 'Adventurer of the Year'.
- In 2019, Zangerl was awarded the Leif Erikson 'Young Explorer Award'.
- In 2025, Zangerl became the 13th climber, and the 2nd female climber, to be awarded the Paul Preuss Prize.

== Notable ascents ==
=== Bouldering ===
- 2008: Pura Vida 8A+/8B (V12/13), Magic Wood, Switzerland. FFFA and one of the hardest female boulder ascents at the time; while the first-ever full 8B (V13) would be by Angie Payne in 2010, Zangerl is considered one of the first-ever boulder at 8A+/8B by a female.
- 2005: X-Ray 8A (V11), Silvretta, Austria.

=== Sport climbing ===
- 2025: Bombardino 9a+ (5.15a) Arco, Italy.
- 2021: Sprengstoff (Explosive) 9a (5.14d) Lorüns Vorarlberg, Austria. FFFA.
- 2020: Instructor 8c+/9a (5.14c/d) Vorarlberg, Austria. FFFA.
- 2020: Unleashed 8c+ (5.14c) Vorarlberg, Austria. FFFA.
- 2019: Everything is Karate 9a (5.14d) Bishop, California, US. FFFA of Ethan Pringle's 2017 route.
- 2018: Speed Integrale 9a (5.14d), Voralpsee, Switzerland. FFFA of Cédric Lachat's 2010 route.
- 2017: Chikane 8c+ (5.14c), Siurana, Spain. Her first 8c+ redpoint.

=== Traditional climbing ===
- 2023: Meltdown 5.14c (8c+), E11, Yosemite, USA. Fourth-ever ascent of Beth Rodden's 2008 traditional testpiece.
- 2021: Le Voyage E10 7a 8b+, Annot, France. FFFA, and the fourth-ever ascent, of James Pearson's 2017 route.
- 2020: Greenspit 5.14a (8b+) R, E10/11, Orco Valley, Italy. FFFA of Didier Berthod's 2003 crack climbing test piece.
- 2018: The Path 5.14a (8b+) R, E10/11, Lake Louise, Alberta, Canada. FFFA of Sonnie Trotter's famous 2007 traditional route.
- 2017: Gondo Crack 5.14b (8c) R, Cippo, Switzerland. FFA as a sport climb, and then made second-ever ascent (and FFFA) as a traditional climb.
- 2016: Achemine E9 6c 8b, Dumbarton Rock, Scotland. FFFA, and first repeat, of Dave MacLeod's 2001 route, and Scotland's first E9.
- 2016: Requiem E8 6b/c 8a, Dumbarton Rock, Scotland. Second-ever female ascent of Dave Cuthbertson's famous 1983 route.
- 2014: Prinzip Hoffnung 5.14 R 8b/+, E9/E10, Vorarlberg, Austria. FFFA of Beat Kammerlander's testpiece.

=== Big wall climbing ===
- 2024: Freerider 7c+ (5.13a) El Capitan, Yosemite, USA. First ever flash of an El Capitan route.
- 2019: The Nose 5.14a (8b+), El Capitan, Yosemite, USA. Zangerl and climbing partner Jacopo Larcher became the 8th and 9th climbers to make a free (i.e. no use of aid climbing techniques) ascent of the famous big wall route that was first freed by Lynn Hill in 1993.
- 2019: Pre-Muir Wall 5.13d (8b), El Capitan, Yosemite, USA. Repeat with climbing partner Jacopo Larcher.
- 2018: Odyssee 5.13c (8a+), Eiger, Switzerland. FFFA and first repeat of the hardest route on the north face of the Eiger with Jacopo Larcher over 4 days. In 2020, the pair returned to make the first one-day ascent of the 1,400-metre route in 16 hours.
- 2018: Sangre de Toro 5.14a (8b+), Rote Wand, Lechquellen, Austria. FFFA of Alex Luger's 2014 free climb.
- 2017: Magic Mushroom 5.14a (8b+), El Capitan, Yosemite, USA. FFFA and second-ever free ascent with Larcher of Caldwell's 2008 route.
- 2016: Zodiac 5.13d (8b), El Capitan, Yosemite, USA. FFFA and third-ever free ascent with Jacopo Larcher of Huber's 2003 route.
- 2015: El Nino 5.13c (8a+), El Capitan, Yosemite, USA. FFFA of Huber's 1998 route.
- 2015: Die Unendliche Geschichte (The Neverending Story) 5.14a (8b+), Rätikon, Switzerland. Joint FFFA with Nina Caprez and only the second-ever repeat of Beat Kammerlander's famous 1990 alpine big wall route.
- 2015: Bellavista 8b+ (5.14a), Cima Ovest, Dolomites, Italy. Repeat of Huber's famous 2001 route; FFFA was by Sasha DiGiulian in 2013.
- 2013: First-ever woman to complete the famous Alpine Trilogy of extreme multi-pitch climbing alpine routes:

- 2013: Des Kaisers neue Kleider 8b+ (5.14a), Fleischbank, Austria. FFFA of Stefan Glowacz's 1994 route.
- 2013: Silbergeier 8b+ (5.14a), Rätikon, Switzerland. Second-ever female ascent of Beat Kammerlander's famous 1993 route.
- 2012: The End of Silence 8b+ (5.14a), Berchtesgaden, Germany. FFA of Thomas Huber's 1994 alpine route.

=== High-altitude climbing ===
- 2022: Eternal Flame 7c+ (5.13a), Nameless Tower, Pakistan. FFFA, and only the third-ever free ascent with partner Jacopo Larcher, of the historic Güllich, Albert et al. 1989 route with the crux at 6000 metres; the FFA was by Alexander and Thomas Huber in 2009.

== Filmography ==
- Momento - A Boulder Life Line (2006)
- Gimme Kraft! (2013)
- Same Same but Different (2013)
- Barbara Zangerl (2015)
- Bürser Platte (2015)
- Golden Line Verdon (2017)
- Rätikon - Gebirge an der Grenze (2017)
- Black Diamond Presents: Babsi and Jacopo Send Zodiac (5.13d) on El Cap (2017)
- Black Diamond Presents: Magic Mushroom (2018)
- Reel Rock S4 E1: Break on Through (2018)
- Reel Rock S9 E2: Burning the Flame (2023)
- Black Diamond Presents: Flashed—Babsi Zangerl's Historic Flash of El Capitan (2025)

== See also ==
- Catherine Destivelle, all-round French female climber
- Alexander Huber, all-round German big-wall climber

== Extended links ==
- Barbara Zangerl at World Climbing
- Barbara Zangerl, theCrag.com web page (2024)
- Barbara Zangerl Athlete Page, UKClimbing Magazine (2024)
- Watch Five Films on Crusher Barbara Zangerl, Gripped Magazine (2017)
