= Prinzip Hoffnung =

Traditional climbing route in Austria

- Principle Hope (Principle of Hope)
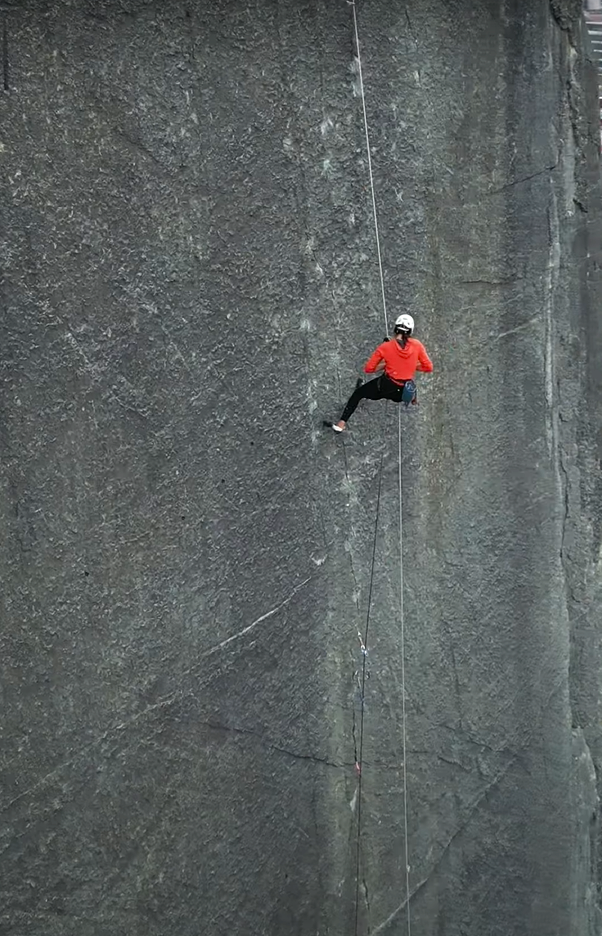
- Anna Hazlett inspecting Prinzip Hoffnung

- Location within Austria
- Location: Bürs, Vorarlberg, Austria
- Coordinates: 47.15078°N 9.80127°E
- Climbing area: German: Bürser Platte
- Route type: Traditional climbing; Slab climbing; Crack climbing
- Rock type: Conglomerate
- Vertical gain: 40 metres (130 ft)
- Pitches: 1
- Technical grade: 5.14 R (US), 8b/+ (French), X/X+ (UIAA), or E9-E10 (British)
- First free ascent: Beat Kammerlander (1997, as a sport climb), (2009, as a traditional climb)
- First female free ascent: Barbara Zangerl, March 2014

Prinzip Hoffnung (in English: Principle Hope or Principle of Hope), is a 40-metre (130 ft) long traditional climbing route on a thin crack up a conglomerate rock slab on the "Bürs plate cliff" (German: Bürser Platte) overlooking the village of Bürs in Vorarlberg, Austria. The route was greenpointed by Austrian climber Beat Kammerlander in 2009, and was one of the earliest traditional climbing routes to be graded at 5.14 R (American), 8b/+ (French), X/X+ (UIAA), or E9-E10 (British); it is still considered one of the hardest traditional climbing routes in the world.

== History ==
The blank south-facing black conglomerate slab on the "Bürs plate cliff" that overlooks the village of Bürs in Vorarlberg, had been known to climbers in the region as a possible project.

In 1997, Austrian climber Marco Wasina made the first redpoint (i.e. after several failed attempts, the first free ascent without falling during that ascent) of the lower part of the route up the length of the first 25-metre (82 ft) thin crack that splits the face, which he did as a bolted sport climb. A few months later, his friend Beat Kammerlander repeated Wasina's route, and then made the difficult moves to extend the route rightwards into another set of even smaller fissure cracks through an almost blank featureless section of 6 metres (20 ft) to create an even harder 40-metre (130 ft) sport climb that he graded at 8b/8b+ (French).

In 2009, Kammerlander removed the bolts (called greenpointing) and spent several months training and mentally preparing himself (and admitting to sleepless nights worrying about the falls), to reclimb it as a traditional route. During his attempts, he took several 15-metre (49 ft) falls from its crux onto small wires below. In September 2009, Kammerlander, aged 50, made the first free ascent (FFA) of Prinzip Hoffnung as a traditional climb. He said: "The Burs Face has always fascinated me. The climb is very particular and uses tiny edges and footholds. If you try it too often you bloody your fingers and wear through the rubber on your shoes. It's a hell of a battle."

In March 2014, Austrian climber Barbara Zangerl made the fifth overall free ascent and the first female free ascent (FFFA) of the route. Even a decade after Kammerlander's first ascent, the route had only recorded its tenth ascent, and in 2023, the route is still ranked as one of the hardest traditional climbing routes in the world.

== Route ==
The route is described as a mix of a crack climb and of a slab climb. The first section is the 25-metre (82 ft) thin finger-crack protected by small cams and wires that eventually peters out. The crux is the transition right across the slab and upwards for another 6 metres (20 ft) to get to a second, very narrow crack, around 9m long, which leads to the top. The crux is described as crimpy and unprotected, and there is a long distance — known in climbing as a runout — to the last point of climbing protection (i.e. being the micro-wire inserted at the top of the first crack). Falls at the crux are intimidating, with an added danger that if the last micro-wire breaks, the fall can be over 15–20 metres (49–66 ft) in length.

== Legacy ==
The Prinzip Hoffnung route is considered a classic crack/slab traditional climb and an important testpiece, with subsequent repeat climbs of Prinzip Hoffnung being closely followed and recorded in the climbing media. Both British climber Maddy Cope, and American climber Anna Hazlett ['Anna Hazelnutt'], said that it was a dream-climb. Hazlett called it "a perfect mix of crack and slab – although it was definitely more cracky than I anticipated".

The route is an important part of Beat Kammerlender's legacy, who was one of Europe's strongest rock climbers in the 1990s, and who made the first-ever ascents of multi-pitch routes at the grade of 8a+ (5.13c) and of 8b+ (5.14a). Kammerlander remarked in 2009 that the climb had "an equal significance in my personal development" as his other major climbing projects that had also required him to develop himself.

== Ascents ==
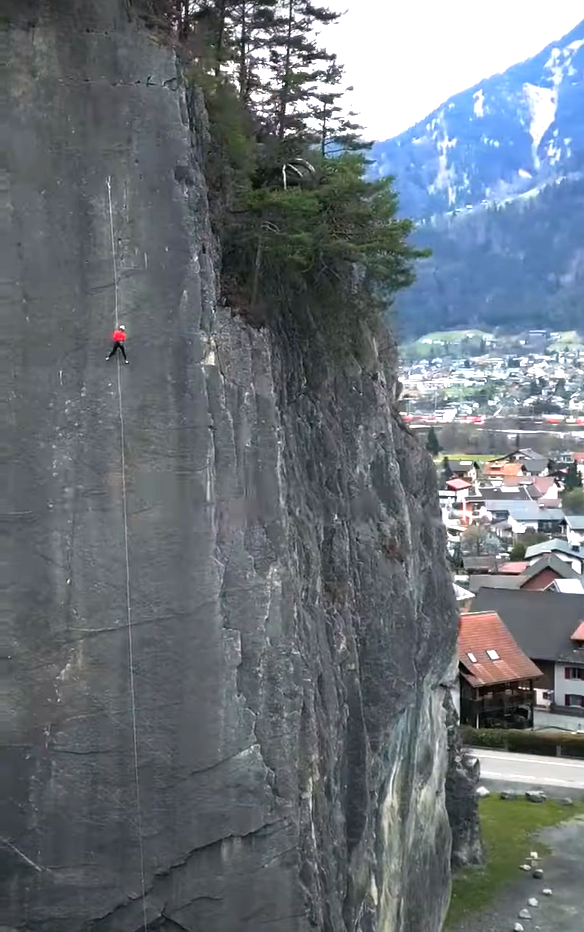
Climber abseiling Prinzip Hoffnung, Bürs

Prinzip Hoffnung has been ascended by (first ten ascents):

- 1st. Beat Kammerlander in September 2009.
- 2nd. Alex Luger in December 2009.
- 3rd. Jacopo Larcher in February 2014.
- 4th. Fabian Buhl in March 2014.
- 5th & 1st Female Free Ascent (FFFA). Barbara Zangerl in March 2014.
- 6th. Christian Bindhammer in April 2014.
- 7th. Michael Gunsilius in February 2018.
- 8th. Nemuel Feurle, aged 16, in April 2018.
- 9th. Michi Wohlleben in March 2019.
- 10th. Nadine Wallner in March 2019.

Notable female free ascents were:

- 1st. Barbara Zangerl in March 2014.
- 2nd. Nadine Wallner in March 2019.
- 3rd. Madeleine Cope in April 2019.
- 4th. Lena Marie Müller in February 2020.
- 5th. Luisa Deubzer in March 2022.
- 6th. Anna Hazlett ['Anna Hazelnutt'] in March 2023.
- 7th. Iris Bielli in March 2024.

== See also ==
- Indian Face, British E9-graded traditional climbing route from 1986
- Separate Reality, American 5.12a-graded traditional climbing route from 1978
- Cobra Crack, American 5.14b-graded traditional climbing route from 2006
