= To the Limit (2007 film) =

Am Limit
- Directed by: Pepe Danquart
- Written by: Pepe Danquart
- Produced by: Kirsten Hager; Erich Lackner; Mirjam Quinte
- Starring: Alexander Huber; Thomas Huber; Dean Potter; Chongo
- Cinematography: Martin Hauslmayr; Franz Hinterbrandner; Max Reichel; Wolfgang Thaler
- Edited by: Mona Bräuer
- Music by: Dorian Cheah; Christoph Israel
- Production company: Hager Moss Film
- Distributed by: First Run Features (United States)
- Release date: 22 March 2007 (Germany)
- Running time: 95 minutes
- Countries: Germany; Austria
- Language: German

To the Limit (German: Am Limit) is a 2007 German documentary film written and directed by German film director Pepe Danquart. The documentary is about brothers Alexander Huber and Thomas Huber climbing the El Capitan rock formation in Yosemite National Park in their attempt to break a speed climbing record.

== Cast ==
- Alexander Huber ... himself
- Thomas Huber ... himself
- Dean Potter ... himself
- Chongo ... himself (Charles Victor Tucker III)

== Head Riggers ==
- Ammon McNeely
- Ivo Ninov

== Awards and nominations ==
=== Film Awards ===
Year	Film Festival	Award	Category
2008	Bavarian Film Awards	Bavarian Film Award	Best Documentary Film

=== Submissions ===
- European Film Awards 2007
  - Best Documentary Award (nominated)
- Deutscher Filmpreis
  - Best Sound (nominated)
  - Outstanding Documentary (nominated)
