= Glenn Singleman =

Australian physician and BASE jumper

Dr. Glenn Singleman (born 12 October 1958) is an Australian physician, professional adventurer, wingsuit pilot and BASE jumper (he holds three official world records). He is also a documentary filmmaker, and practicing medical doctor specializing in remote and rural medicine. His film BASEclimb, about a world record setting BASE jump from The Great Trango Towers in Pakistan, won 21 International awards.

He led the BASEClimb High Performance Wingsuit Team in a flight across the Grand Canyon, from the North Rim to the South Rim - a world first. The team, which included Singleman's wife, Heather Swan, Roger Hugelshofer, Vicente Cajiga and Paul Tozer flew 11.6 kilometres, exiting a Cessna Grand Supervan flown by Ray Ferrell at 28,000 ft. They landed on Hualapai Indian Nation land.

In 2012, Singleman was a key member of the ‘Challenger Deep' team that successfully sent James Cameron to the deepest point on the planet – The Mariana Trench – in a submarine designed and built in Australia. Dr. Singleman was a member of the management team, the Expedition Doctor, one of the life support supervisors and Second Unit Director of the National Geographic 3D Feature Film released in 2013. This was Dr. Singleman’s third project with Cameron (Avatar, Titanic, The Terminator). – the others being Cameron's Aliens of the Deep (3D IMAX) and Last Mysteries of the Titanic (Discovery Channel).

Singleman is also a motivational speaker and media commentator on extreme sport, fear and managing risk and has spoken all around the world. Dr. Singleman continues to work as a medical practitioner, working in the Intensive Care Unit at Sydney Adventist Hospital in Sydney. He is also a specialist in remote and rural medicine and a Fellow of the Australian College of Remote and Rural Medicine (ACRRM).

== Expeditions and achievements ==
=== February 1988 - Mount Minto, Antarctica ===
Singleman made first ascent of Mount Minto – highest mountain in the Admiralty Ranges of Antarctica (4163 M) as part of Bicentennial Antarctic Expedition with Greg Mortimer, Lincoln Hall, Lyle Closs, Chris Hilton and Jonathan Chester. He was also the expedition doctor and co-directed/co-produced/co-edited the documentary of the expedition (The Loneliest Mountain).

=== November 1988 - Puncak Jaya, Irian Jaya ===
Second Australian ascent of Puncak Jaya (Carstensz Pyramid) in Irian Jaya via new route on west ridge.

=== June 1989 - Highest black tie dinner Party ===
Glenn was the Expedition doctor, location director and cameraman for Social Climbers Expedition to have highest black tie dinner party in the world at 6768 M (22,205 ft) – a charity mountaineering event that raised $20,000 and was recognized by the Guinness Book of Records. The expedition was led by Chris Darwin (great great grandson of naturalist Charles Darwin).

=== October 1991 - First hot air balloon flight over Mount Everest ===
Glenn was the Expedition doctor and cameraman filming the first hot air balloon flight over Mount Everest (an expedition led by Australian balloon pilot Chris Dewhirst and UK adventurer Leo Dickinson).

=== August 1992 - The Great Trango Tower world record ===
Glenn Singleman and a Nic Feteris BASE jumped from a ledge at 5880 M (19,300 ft) on The Great Trango Tower in the Karakorum Himalaya in Pakistan. This was the first ever Himalayan BASE jump and established a world record for exit height that stood for 14 years. The expedition was led by Singleman. One of the members of expedition was famous awards-winning Russian mountaineer Владислав Павлович (Влад) Мороз

=== May 2006 - Altitude BASE jumping and Wingsuit BASE jump World Record ===
In 2006, with his wife Heather Swan, Singleman set a new World Record for high altitude BASE jumping (6604 M highest exit point) and the highest Wingsuit BASE jump (exit point) from Mt. Meru (6672M) in Garwhal Himalaya in India. The Australian Geographic Society recognised the achievement with a Spirit of Adventure Award – the third awarded to Singleman. The expedition was also led by Singleman.

=== July 2008 - Highest wingsuit jump world record ===
Singleman set an unofficial world record for the highest wingsuit jump (37,650 ft) from a hot air balloon over the Australian outback. The jump was featured on 60 Minutes and was an 11-page feature article in Australian Geographic Magazine. The expedition was led by Singleman.

=== December 2011 - First and only wingsuit flight across Sydney Harbour ===
Singleman and his wife, Heather Swan, and Vicente Cajiga made the first and only wingsuit flight across Sydney Harbour exiting at 13,500 ft above Rose Bay and landing at Barangaroo. The jump took three years to organize and required approval from 9 government departments.

== Film making credits ==
1987 – A Spire – Co-Producer/Co-Director/Cameraman documentary for ABC about first ascent of Sydney Tower at Centrepoint (by Chris Hilton)

1988 – The Loneliest Mountain – Co-Producer/Co-Director/Cameraman documentary for Film Australia about Bicentennial Antarctic Expedition

1991 – Fire on the Wind – Location Director and cameraman documentary for National Geographic and ZDF about Social Climbers expedition

1993 - BASEClimb (aka The Most Dangerous Jump in the World, aka Jump from 6000M, aka Over the Top) – produced and directed by Singleman about the Trango Tower BASE jump expedition - . Critically and popularly acclaimed the film won 21 International Awards screened in 154 countries and was featured as part of the Best Of National Geographic Television and excerpts appeared in the National Geographic Millennium Special, Footage of the jump has been described as the most powerful ever shot of BASE jumping. BASEClimb was voted one of the best 10 adventure documentaries of all time by American Men's Journal.

1994 – A Glorious Way to Die – treatment writer documentary about Siberian river rats. Produced by Fleur Films

In 2000 - 2002 Glenn wrote, produced and directed BASEClimb 2 Defying Gravity for ABC, which told the story of his wife Heather's quest to learn to mountaineer and BASE jump so she could break his world record from the Great Trango Tower. BASEClimb 2 screened around the world on free-to-air and NationalGeographic cable and quickly surpassed the original BASEClimb documentary commercially.

2003 – Expedition doctor and 3D camera assistant for James Cameron’s Aliens of the Deep (3D IMAX documentary).

2005 – Expedition doctor and camera operator for Last Mysteries of the Titanic – live television documentary from the Titanic wreck with James Cameron

2011 – Expedition doctor and Producer/Director/Co-Editor of No Ceiling – the BASEClimb 3 story – documentary for international television release on free-to-air, cable and DVD.

== Personal life ==
Married to Heather Swan. He has two children, David and Nathan from his first marriage to Irina Tolkunova
