= Melloblocco =

International bouldering competition

Melloblocco is an international bouldering competition, which is held annually in Val Masino and Val di Mello since 2004.

== History ==
The 2011 edition, the eighth time the competition was hosted, had 2600 participants from 22 different countries. The competition usually takes place the first weekend in May and lasts three days. The bouldering problems are plotted in the three to four months before the meeting by Simone Pedeferri. The problems are of varying difficulty, but only the most difficult, usually eight men and the same for women, are counted for the prize. On the last day, rewards are given to athletes who are able to climb as many of the boulders as possible during the competition.

== Winners ==
Year	Men	Women
2004	(United States) Chris Sharma	(Italy) Stefania De Grandi
2005	-	-
2006	(Italy) Mauro Calibani (France) Anthony Lamiche	(Austria) Barbara Zangerl
2007	(Italy) Mauro Calibani	(Italy) Stefania De Grandi (Italy) Anita Manachino
2008	(Czech Republic) Adam Ondra	(Austria) Barbara Zangerl
2009	(Czech Republic) Adam Ondra	(Russia) Yulia Abramchuk (Russia) Olga Bibik (Russia) Alexandra Balakireva (Russia) Anna Gallyamova (Belgium) Chloé Graftiaux (Czech Republic) Silvie Rajfovà
2010	(Czech Republic) Adam Ondra	(Belgium) Chloé Graftiaux
2011	(Czech Republic) Adam Ondra (Italy) Gabriele Moroni	(Austria) Barbara Zangerl
2012	(Italy) Michele Caminati (Finland) Anthony Gullsten (Russia) Alexey Rubtsov	(United Kingdom) Shauna Coxsey
2013	(Italy) Stefano Ghisolfi	(Austria) Barbara Zangerl
2014	(Italy) Stefano Ghisolfi (Italy) Gabriele Moroni (Italy) Marcello Bombardi (Finland) Anthony Gullsten (Russia) Alexey Rubtsov (Italy) Michael Piccolruaz (Japan) Sachi Amma	(Russia) Yulia Abramchuk (France) Mélissa Le Nevé
2015	(Czech Republic) Adam Ondra (Finland) Anthony Gullsten (Czech Republic) Martin Stráník (Italy) Stefano Ghisolfi	(Slovenia) Janja Garnbret
2016	(Italy) Stefano Ghisolfi	(Italy) Jenny Lavarda
