= Hainablak Glacier =

Glacier in Pakistan

- Location within Karakoram Location within Gilgit Baltistan
- Interactive map of Hainablak Glacier
- Type: Mountain glacier
- Location: Baltoro Muztagh of Karakoram, Gilgit-Baltistan, Pakistan
- Coordinates: 35°45′39″N 76°08′43″E

Hainablak Glacier is a glacier near Trango Tower mountain in Baltistan, Gilgit-Baltistan, Pakistan.

== See also ==
- Trango Glacier
- List of mountains in Pakistan
- List of highest mountains
- List of glaciers
