= Trango Glacier =

Glacier in Pakistan

- ترانگو گلیشیر (Urdu)
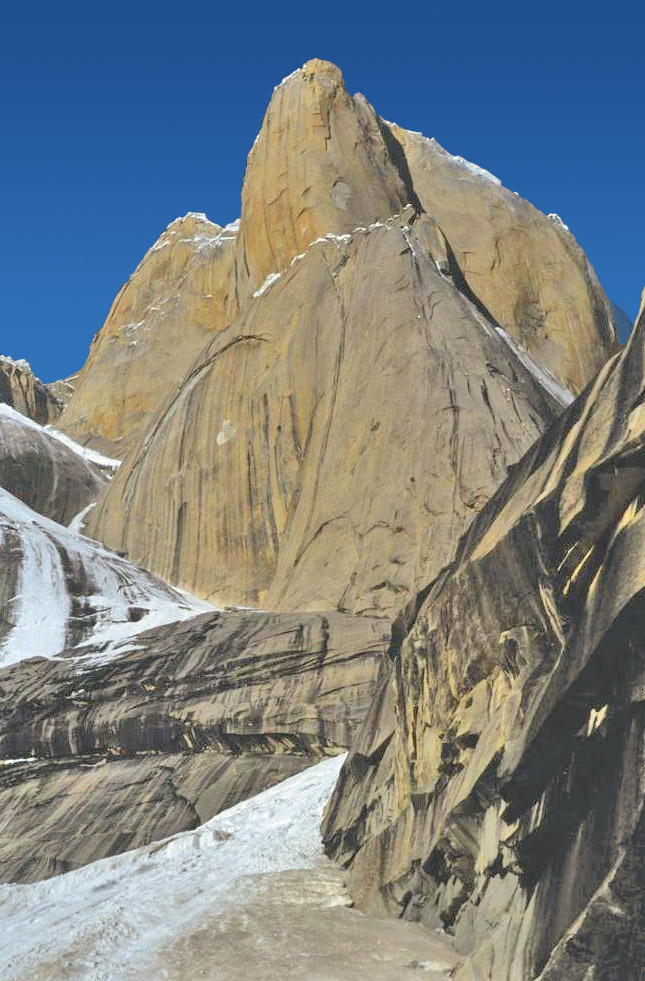
- The Great Trango Tower

- Location within Karakoram Location within Gilgit Baltistan
- Interactive map of Trango Glacier
- Type: Mountain glacier
- Location: Baltoro Muztagh of Karakoram, Gilgit-Baltistan, Pakistan
- Coordinates: 35°48′N 76°08′E

Trango Glacier (Chinese: 川口冰川, Urdu: ترانگو گلیشیر) is a glacier in the Baltoro Muztagh range of the Karakoram in Baltistan, Gilgit-Baltistan, Pakistan.

== Geography ==
It flows from north to south on the west side of the Trango Towers and joins the Baltoro Glacier.

The Great Trango Tower, declared a record holder for the "greatest nearly vertical drop" in the world at 1,340 metres (4,400 ft), has a height of 6,286 metres (20,623 ft).

== See also ==
- Hainablak Glacier
- Trango Towers
- List of mountains in Pakistan
- List of highest mountains
- List of glaciers
