= Trango Towers =

Granite spires in mountains in Pakistan

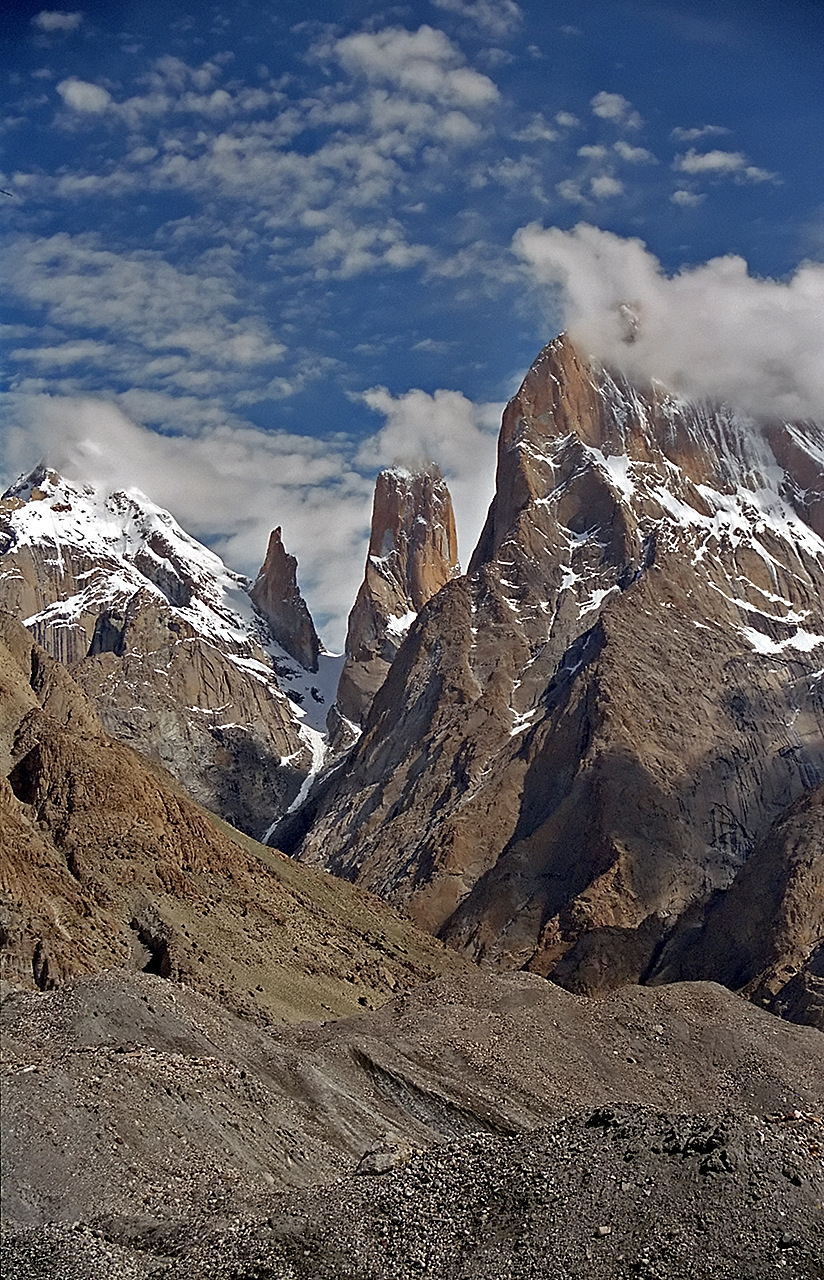
- Viewed from the southwest, from left to right: Trango II, Trango Monk, Trango Tower, Great Trango Tower

Highest point
- Elevation: 6,286 m (20,623 ft)
- Prominence: Approx. 800 m (2,600 ft)
- Coordinates: 35°45′26″N 76°12′05″E

Naming
- Native name: ٹرینگو ٹاورز (Urdu)

Geography
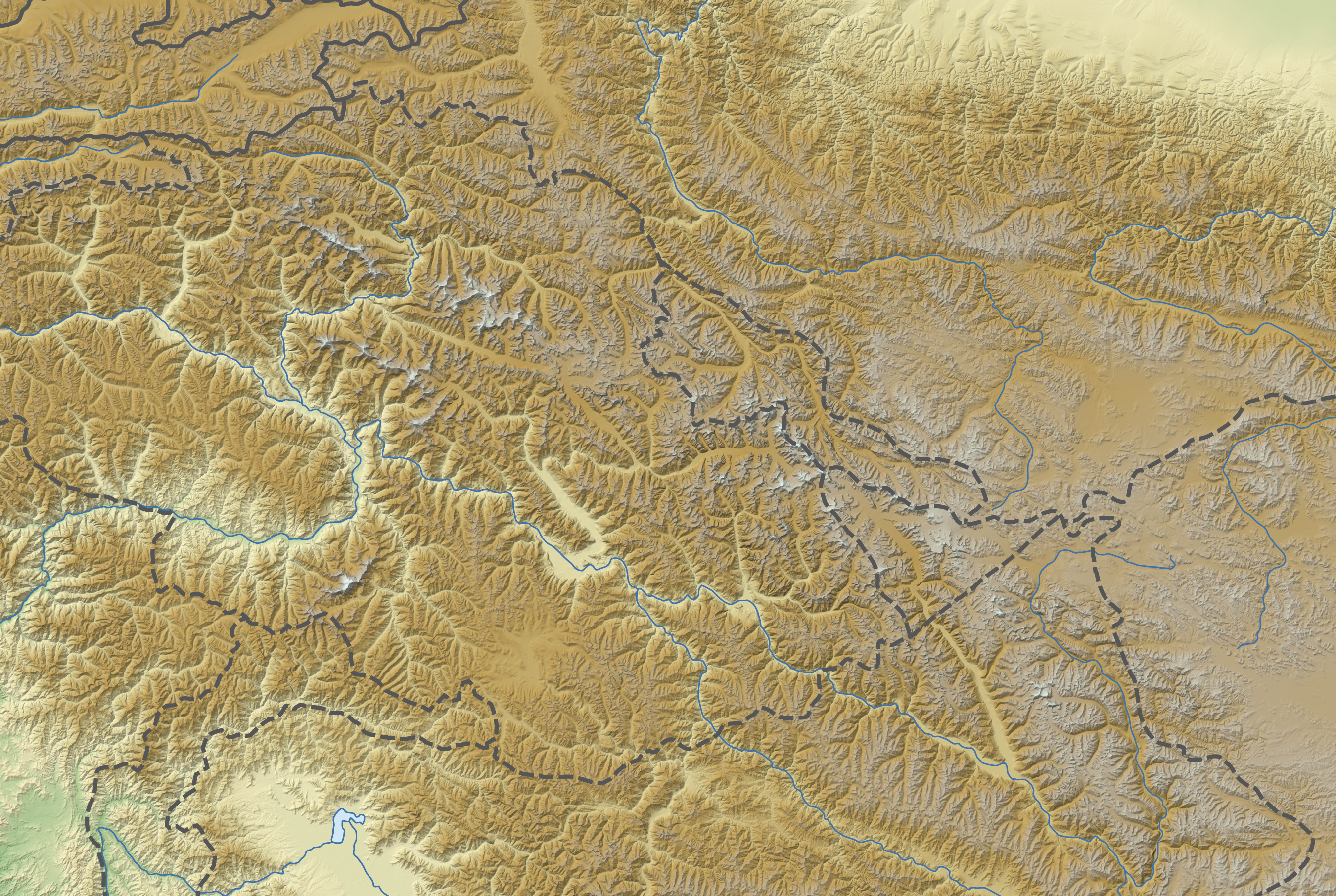
- Location within Karakoram Location within Gilgit Baltistan
- Location: Baltistan, Pakistan
- Parent range: Baltoro Muztagh, Karakoram

Geology
- Mountain type: Granite

Climbing
- First ascent: 1977 by Galen Rowell, John Roskelley, Kim Schmitz and Dennis Hennek
- Easiest route: Northwest face: snow/ice/rock climb

The Trango Towers (Urdu: ٹرینگو ٹاورز) are a family of rock towers situated in the Gilgit-Baltistan region, in northern Pakistan. The Towers have some of the world's largest cliffs and offer some of the most challenging big wall climbing opportunities. Each year, climbers from around the world embark on expeditions to the Karakoram region to climb these granite faces. The Trango Towers are situated to the north of the Baltoro Glacier and are part of the Baltoro Muztagh, which is a sub-range of the Karakoram. The highest point within the group is the summit of Great Trango Tower at 6,286 m (20,623 ft), the east face of which features the world's greatest nearly vertical drop.

== Structure of the group ==
All of the Trango Towers lie on a ridge, running northwest to southeast, with Trango Glacier to the west and the Dunge Glacier to the east. Great Trango itself is a large massif, with three distinct summits: Main (6,286 m (20,623 ft)), East (6,231 m (20,443 ft)), and West (6,223 m (20,417 ft)). It is a complex combination of steep snow/ice gullies, steeper rock faces, and vertical to overhanging headwalls, topped by a snowy ridge system.

Just northwest of Great Trango is the Trango Tower (6,239 m (20,469 ft)), often called "Nameless Tower". This is a very large, pointed, rather symmetrical spire which juts 1,000 m (3,300 ft) out of the ridgeline. North of Trango Tower is a smaller rock spire known as "Trango Monk." To the north of this feature, the ridge becomes less rocky and loses the large granite walls that distinguish the Trango Towers group and make them so attractive to climbers; however, the summits do get higher. These summits are not usually considered part of the Trango Towers group, though they share the Trango name. Trango II (6,237 m (20,463 ft)) lies northwest of the Monk, and the highest summit on the ridge, Trango Ri (6,363 m (20,876 ft)), lies northwest of Trango II.

Just southeast of Great Trango (really a part of its southeast ridge) is the Trango Pulpit (6,050 m (19,850 ft)), whose walls present similar climbing challenges to those of Great Trango itself. Further, to the south is Trango Castle (5,753 m (18,875 ft)), the last large peak along the ridge before the Baltoro Glacier.

== Climbing history ==
Overall, the Trango Towers group has seen some of the most difficult and significant big wall climbs ever accomplished, due to the combination of altitude, total height of the routes, and the steepness of the rock. All of the routes are highly technical climbs.

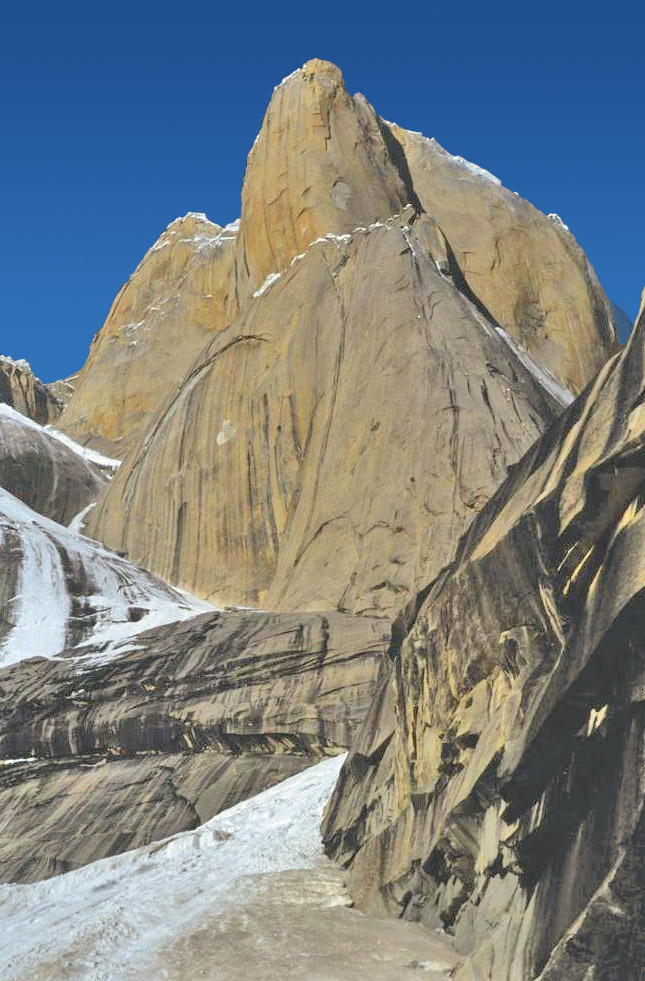
Great Trango Tower

=== Great Trango ===
==== Main summit ====
- 1977 South Face. Great Trango was first climbed in 1977 by Galen Rowell, John Roskelley, Kim Schmitz, Jim Morrissey, and Dennis Hennek by a route that started from the west side (Trango Glacier), and climbed a combination of ice ramps and gullies with rock faces, finishing on the upper South Face.
- 1984 Northwest Face. Another long alpine route on Great Trango is on the Northwest Face, and was climbed in 1984 by Andy Selters and Scott Woolums. This is a long technical alpine climb with extensive rock and ice climbing.

==== East face and summit ====
- 1984 East Face. The east face of the Great Trango was first climbed (to the East Summit) in 1984 by the Norwegians Hans Christian Doseth and Finn Dæhli, who both died on the descent.
- 1992 The Grand Voyage (VII 5.10 A4+ WI3), duration 18 days. The first successful climb of and return from the East Summit was in 1992, by Xaver Bongard and John Middendorf, via "The Grand Voyage", a route parallel to that of the ill-fated Norwegians, and the only route ever completed up the 1,340 m east-southeast headwall. These two climbs have been called "perhaps the hardest big-wall climbs in the world."
- 1999 Parallel Worlds (VII 5.11 A4). Alex Lowe, Mark Synnott, Jared Ogden, duration 28 days

=== Trango (Nameless) Tower ===
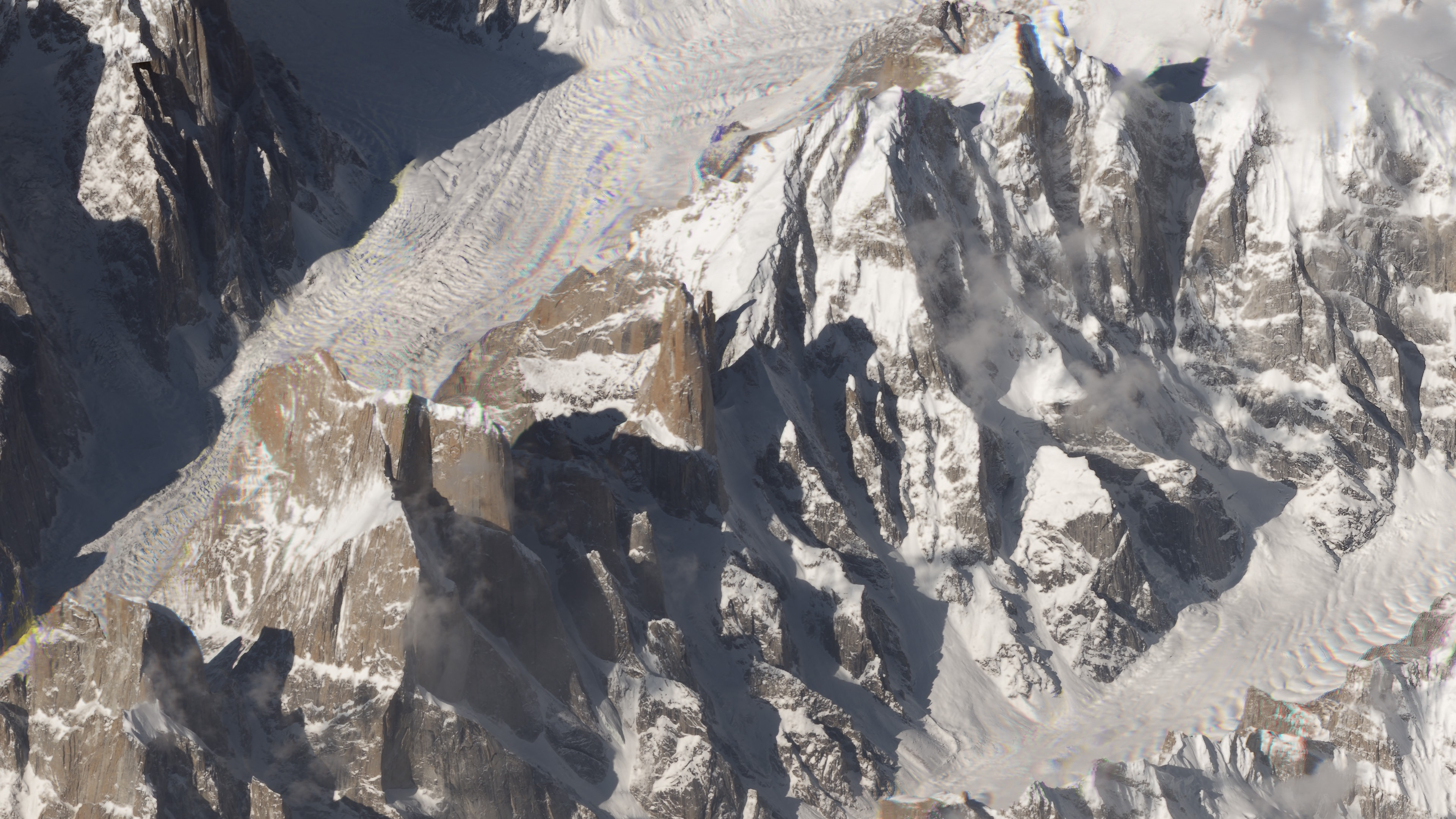
Trango Tower, as seen from a SkySat satellite

Trango (Nameless) Tower was first climbed in 1976 by the British climber Joe Brown, along with Mo Anthoine, Martin Boysen, and Malcolm Howells. There are at least eight separate routes to the summit.

After several unsuccessful attempts, the second and third ascents were achieved in 1987, with the opening of two new routes: The Slovenian Route, better known as the Yugoslav Route, a pure, clean, logical crack route on the south-southeast face, by Slavko Cankar, Franc Knez and Bojan Šrot, and the Great Overhanging Dihedral Route, a spectacular and technical ascent on the western pillar, by Swiss/French team Michel "Tchouky" Fauquet, Patrick Delale, Michel Piola and Stephane Schaffter.

The first route that was freed (using fixed lines to return to a base each night), in 1988, was the Yugoslav Route by the German team Kurt Albert, Wolfgang Güllich, and Hartmut Münchenbach.

Another notable route is Eternal Flame (named after a Bangles song), first climbed on 20 September 1989 by Kurt Albert, Wolfgang Güllich, Milan Sykora, and Christoph Stiegler. This route ascends the South-East Face of the Tower and was climbed almost entirely free. These climbs inaugurated an era of pure rock-climbing techniques and aesthetics on high-altitude peaks.

The first ascent by a female mountaineer, on 6 September 1990, was achieved in free climbing style, again on the Yugoslav Route, by Catherine Destivelle (with Jeff Lowe, and David Breashears filming).

In the summer of 2009, Franz Hinterbrandner, Mario Walder and Alexander, and Thomas Huber did the first free ascent of Eternal Flame.

=== Other summits ===
In 1999, the West Summit of Great Trango and the Trango Pulpit saw their first ascent. Two teams, one American and one Russian, nearly simultaneously, by parallel routes. The American team of Alex Lowe, Jared Ogden, and Mark Synnott climbed a long, bold, highly technical line that they called "Parallel Worlds." They reported difficulties up to 5.11 and A4. The Russian team of Igor Potan'kin, Alexandr Odintsov, Ivan Samoilenko, and Yuri Koshelenko climbed an equally proud route (Eclissi) and encountered similar technical challenges. Both climbs were nominated for the prestigious Piolet d'Or award in 1999. The northeast face on the Pulpit was climbed by a Norwegian team ("Norwegian Direct", Robert Caspersen, Gunnar Karlsen, Per L. Skjerven, and Einar Wold) over a total of 38 days on the wall. The team reported of difficulties up to A4/5.11. Another route over Trango Pulpit is More Czech Less Slovak route VII 7-UIAA A2 (Southeast Ridge). It was climbed by a 1999 Czechoslovak team (Ivo Wondracek, Tomas Rinn, Pavel Weisser, Jaro Dutka, and Michal Drasar).

=== BASE jump ===
On 26 August 1992, Australians Nic Feteris and Glenn Singleman climbed Great Trango and then BASE jumped from an elevation of 5,955 metres (19,537 feet) from the Northeast Face (on the other side of the Norwegian Pillar from the 1,340-metre (4,400 ft) East Face wall), landing on the northern side of the Dunge Glacier at an altitude of 4,200 metres (13,800 feet). This was the highest starting elevation for a BASE jump on record. On 10 August 2013, Andrey Lebedev and Vladimir Murzaev performed a base jump from the same location as Feteris and Singleman on a low budget and with little fanfare. In 2023 Eric Jamet and Antoine Pecher repeated Australians Feteris & Singleman's jump. Then the pair went on to climb the Eternal Flame route Nameless Tower in Pakistan (6,200 metres or 20,300 feet), which they also BASE jumped. They submitted a 26 minute film to the Banff film festival that has been part of the 2023 & 2024 roadshow.

=== Ski descent ===
On 9 May 2024, Chantel Astorga, Christina Lustenberger and Jim Morrison made the first ski descent of Great Trango Tower via the west face.

=== Recent ascents ===
Some more recent ascents on Great Trango have focused on the longer routes found on the west and south sides. In particular, in 2004 Josh Wharton and Kelly Cordes completed a new, very long (2,256 metres or 7,402 feet) route on the Southwest Ridge, or Azeem Ridge, to the Southwest Summit. Though not as extremely technical as the East Face routes, the climb was notable for the extremely lightweight and fast (5 days) style in which it was done.

Over seven days in August 2005, two Slovak climbers, Gabo Cmarik and Jozef Kopold, climbed a new route, which they termed Assalam Alaikum, to the right of the Wharton/Cordes line on the south face of Great Trango. The climb comprised around 90 pitches, up to 5.11d A2. They used a lightweight style similar to that of Wharton and Cordes.

In the same month, Samuel Johnson, Jonathon Clearwater, and Jeremy Frimer made the first ascent of the southwest ridge of Trango II, which they termed Severance Ridge. The route involved 1,600 m of climbing over five days, with rock climbing up to 5.11 A2 and ice and mixed climbing up to AI3 M5.

During May/June 2008, the Norwegian route on the east face of Great Trango (1984) was repeated by the four Norwegian climbers Rolf Bae, Bjarte Bø, Sigurd Felde, and Stein-Ivar Gravdal, spending 27 days in the wall to reach the summit and three more days for the descent. This is reportedly the first repetition of the route, and thus also the first successful ascent and return. Rolf Bae died later that summer. He was one of 11 climbers who were killed in the 2008 K2 disaster.

In mid-August 2009, Alexander and Thomas Huber managed to make an all free ascent of "Eternal Flame" on Nameless Tower, with climbing up to French grade 7c+.

== See also ==
- Mount Thor
- Cerro Torre
- Trango Glacier
- Hainablak Glacier
- List of mountains in Pakistan
- List of highest mountains
