= Thomas Huber =

German climber and mountaineer (born 1966)

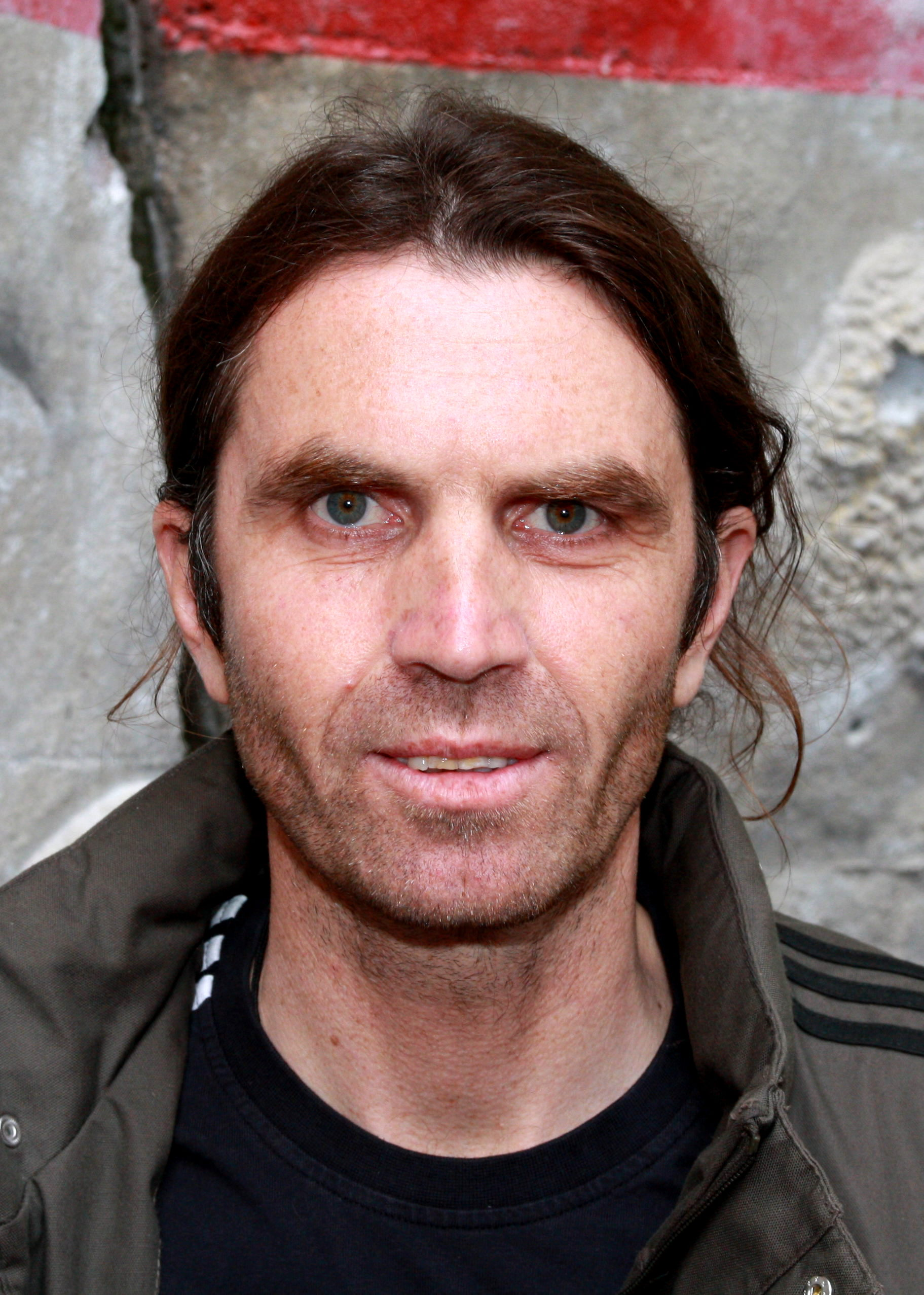
- Huber in 2009

Personal information
- Born: 18 November 1966 (age 59) Palling, Bavaria, West Germany
- Relative: Alexander Huber (brother)
- Website: www.huberbuam.de

Climbing career
- Type of climber: Sport climbing; Traditional climbing; Big wall climbing; Alpine climbing
- Highest grade: Redpoint: 8b+ (5.14a)
- Known for: Several first free ascents of big walls
- Updated on 15 December 2022

Thomas Huber (born 18 November 1966) is a German rock climber (especially big wall climbing) and mountaineer (especially alpine climbing). He lives in Berchtesgaden with his family. His brother and regular climbing partner is Alexander Huber, and the two are called "Huberbuam" (Huberboys) in the Bavarian dialect; they were the subject of the 2007 documentary film To the Limit. In 2001, Huber won the 10th Piolet d'Or award with Iwan Wolf for their ascent of the direct north pillar of Shivling.

== Early life and education ==
Thomas Huber was born on 18 November 1966, in Palling, Bavaria as the first child of Thomas and Maria Huber.

His father was a climber known for early speed ascents of now classic climbs. He took him and his brother Alexander Huber into the mountains. He has been climbing since he was 10 years old. In early April 1980, at 13 years of age, his father took them to climb their first 4000m peak, the Allalinhorn. In 1982, he climbed the Rebitsch Crack 5.10/A0 on the Fleischbankpfeiler in the Wilder Kaiser with the youth climbing team.

In 1983, he and his brother spent their first climbing vacation without their father. They started at the little village of Ellmau, and spent a week at the Gaudeamushütte in the Wilder Kaiser to pursue routes on the east face of Karlspitze or the Bauernpredigtstuhl. Towards the end of the holidays, they went for their first ascent, starting out at the Reiter Alpe for the Wagendrischelhorn south face. Their route was named Rauhnachtstanz, 5.10.

== Career ==
Since 1992, Huber has been a state-certified mountain and skiing guide. He is most famous for climbing big walls in the Himalaya.

In 1997, Huber, his brother Alexander, Toni Gutsch, and Conrad Anker went to climb Pakistan's Latok II, in his first trip to the Karakoram. At the time, Huber felt he was still inexperienced, but he credits his strong team and good weather for the successful ascent, which encouraged him to become a professional mountaineer.

On 31 May 2000, Huber and Swiss climber Iwan Wolf climbed Shiva's Line, a 1500m route of the North Pillar of Shivling, considered one of the most challenging routes in the Himalayas, with an overhang graded at A4/VII. For the accomplishment, the pair were awarded the 2001 Piolet d'Or.

The 2007 documentary To the Limit shows him and his brother speed climbing.

In 2014, Huber and his brother committed to climbing Latok I's north face in Pakistan, one of the last unclimbed problems in the Himalayas. He would commit the next decade to climbing Latok over the course of several expeditions. The next year, he returned for another unsuccessful attempt, where he and his brother were nearly scraped from the mountain by an avalanche. Huber described the experience as follows: “It is clear to me that the north face of Latok I is so incalculably dangerous that I feel no more motivation to tackle it. I’m looking for other difficult goals without this incalculable risk.”

In July 2016, Huber had a sixteen-meter free fall while being filmed at a wall on the Brendlberg in the vicinity of Berchtesgaden and suffered a skull fracture.

By August 2016 he had recovered enough to go on the next expedition, once again to Latok I. The attempt was unsuccessful. In 2019, he once again attempted the north face of Latok I, but was unsuccessful, but returned for another attempt in 2024.

In late July 2025 Huber took part in the rescue attempts for German climber and former biathlete Laura Dahlmeier, who went missing after being hit by a rockfall while climbing Laila Peak in northern Pakistan.

== Personal life ==
Huber lives in Berchtesgaden with his wife and three children. In 2011, he was diagnosed with a kidney tumour, which was removed and turned out to be benign. For two months afterwards he felt weakened.

== Notable achievements ==
- 1994 First redpoint ascent of The End of Silence (5.13d/X+/8b+), one of the hardest multi-pitch climbing routes in the world at that time
- 1996 Free ascent of the route "Salathé Wall" on El Capitan in Yosemite Valley; Winter solo ascent of the Eiger north face
- 1997 First ascent of the route "Tsering Mosong" (VII+, A3+) on Latok II, 7108m, Pakistan.
- 1998 First ascent of El Niño on El Capitan, and Freerider, the first male free ascent of an El Capitan route in one day with Alexander Huber
- 1999 Second ascent of the south west wall of Latok IV (6445m), Pakistan.
- 2000 First ascent of the direct north pillar of the Shivling (6543m) with Iwan Wolf and winner of the Piolet d'Or
- 2001 First ascent of Baintha Brakk III (6800m), second ascent of Baintha Brakk I (7285m), Pakistan.
- 2003 First free ascent of "Zodiac" (5.13d/X+/8b+) on El Capitan with Alexander Huber
- 2004 Speed record on El Capitan, "Zodiac", in 1:52h
- 2007 Speed record on El Capitan, "The Nose", in 2:45,45h
- 2008 First ascent of the west wall of Holtanna in Queen Maud Land, Antarctica, together with brother Alexander and Stephan Siegrist
- 2008 Ascent of Ulvetanna in Queen Maud Land, Antarctica, together with brother Alexander and Stephan Siegrist
- 2009 First free ascent with Alexander of Eternal Flame, (5.13a), on Trango ("Nameless") Tower (6,239 m), Pakistan.

== Publications ==
- Alexander Huber and Thomas Huber: The Wall. BLV, 2000, ISBN 3-405-15685-8
- Thomas Huber: Ogre - Gipfel der Träume, BLV, 2002, ISBN 3-405-16374-9
