= Desnivel =

Spanish climbing magazine

- Editor: Darío Rodríguez
- Frequency: Monthly
- Publisher: Editorial Desnivel
- Founded: 1981
- Country: Spain
- Based in: Madrid
- Language: Spanish
- ISSN: 0211-9765

Desnivel is Spain's first monthly independent climbing and mountaineering magazine, published since 1981.

== History and profile ==
Desnivel was founded in 1981 by Spanish mountaineer and journalist Darío Rodríguez. Under the leadership of Rodríguez the magazine became very influential in Spanish climbing circles.

The magazine is published monthly in Madrid and is focused on mountaineering (Pyrenees, Alps, expeditions) and climbing (Iberian Peninsula). Today the Editorial Desnivel is publishing mountaineering books and three magazines: Desnivel (mountaineering/climbing), Escalar (sport climbing) and Grandes Espacios (outdoor).

== See also ==
- Rock & Ice
- Climbing magazine
- American Alpine Journal
