= Grand Capucin =

Mountain in France

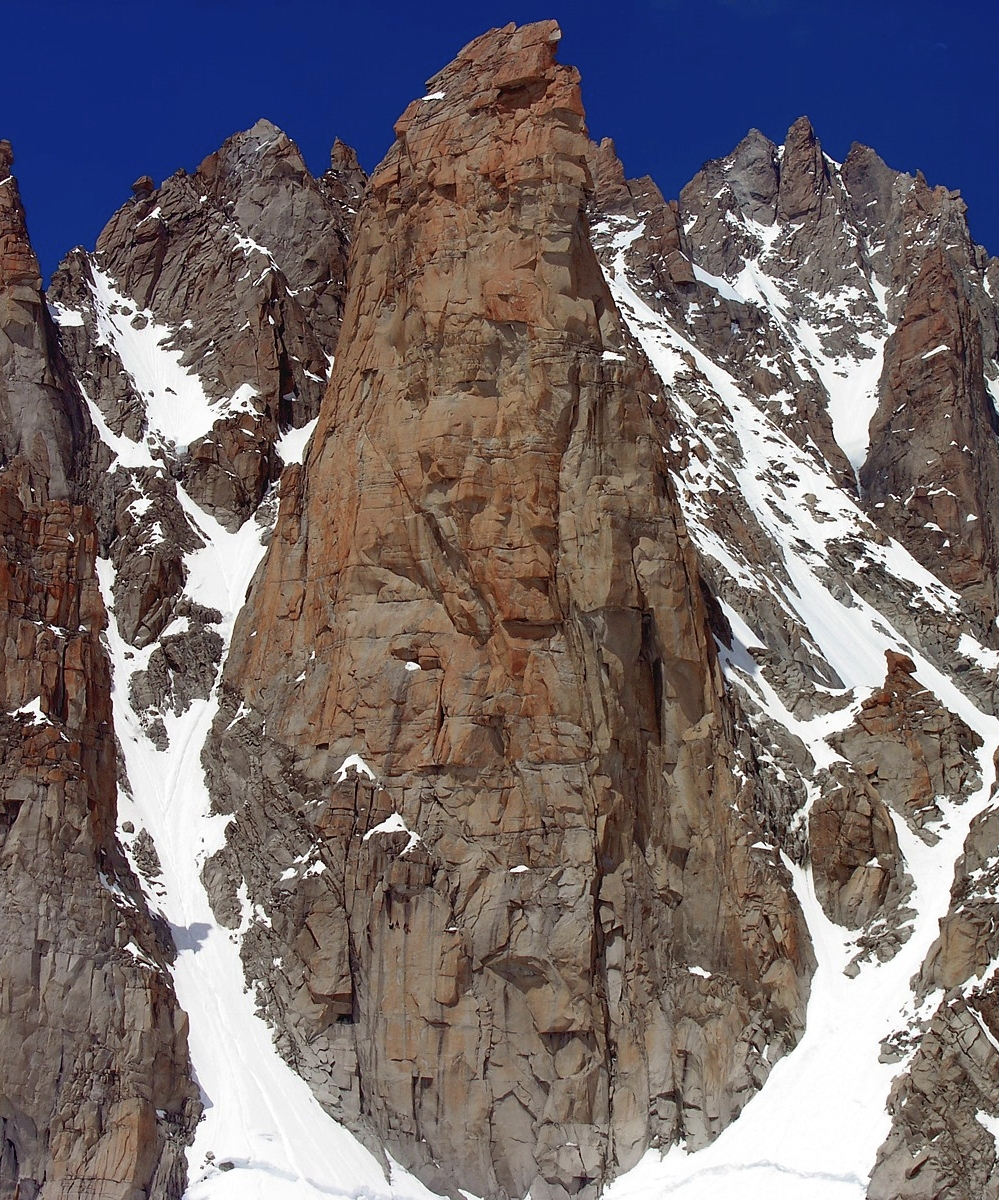
- The Grand Capucin

Highest point
- Elevation: 3,838 m (12,592 ft)
- Prominence: 18 m (59 ft)
- Coordinates: 45°51′06″N 06°53′53″E

Geography
- Location within France
- Location: Haute-Savoie, France
- Parent range: Mont Blanc Massif

The Grand Capucin (3,838 m) is a rock pinnacle located underneath Mont Blanc du Tacul in the Mont Blanc Massif in Haute-Savoie, France.

== Climbing ==
The Grand Capucin is famous for its amazing climbing, but only at harder levels or with Aid.
