= Palling =

- Municipality
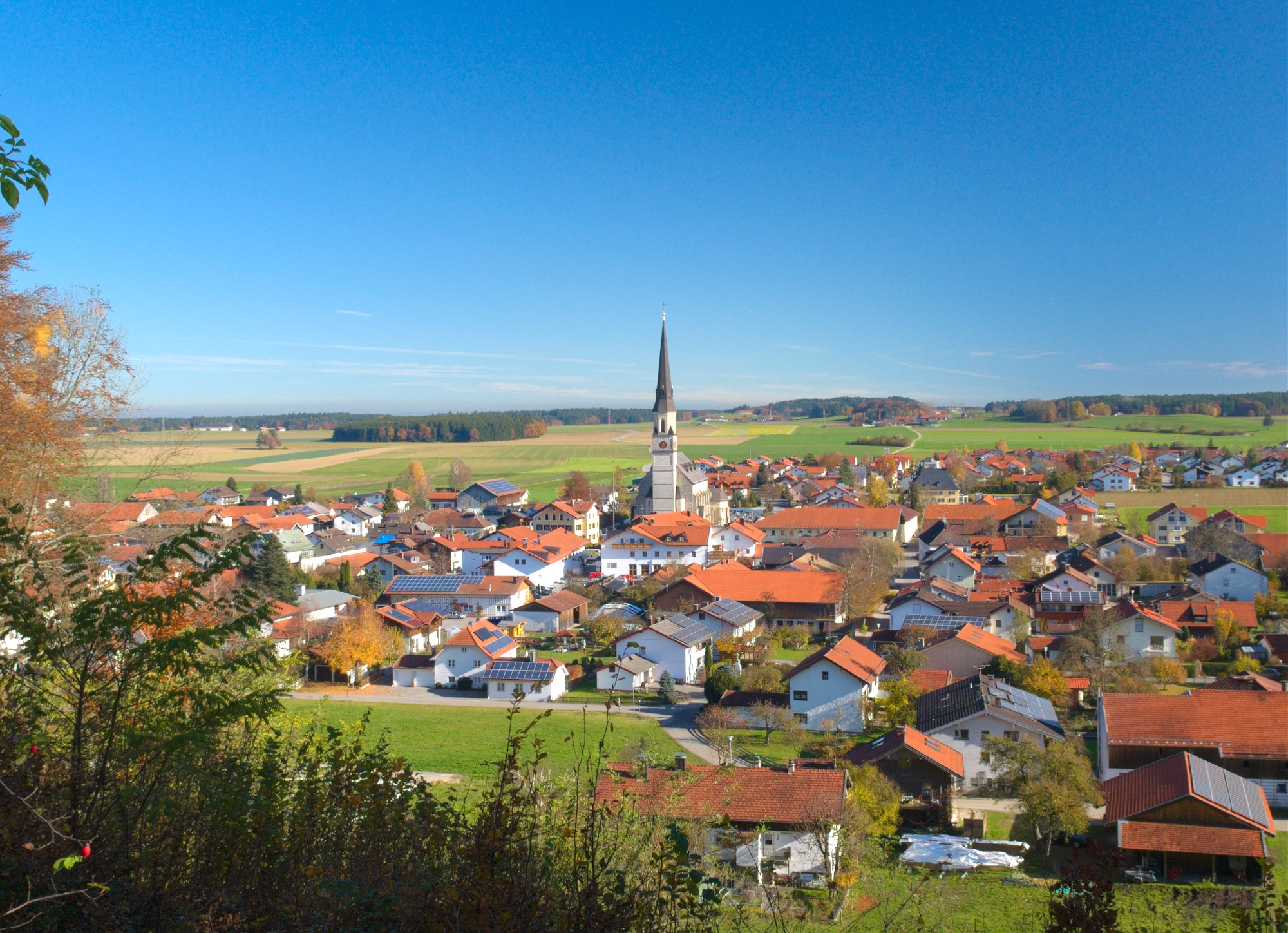
- Palling seen from Kalvarienberg

- Coat of arms

- Location of Palling within Traunstein district
- Interactive map of Palling
- Location within Germany Location within Bavaria
- Coordinates: 48°00′N 12°38′E
- Country: Germany
- State: Bavaria
- Admin. region: Oberbayern
- District: Traunstein

Government
  - Mayor (2020–26): Franz Ostermaier

Area
  - Total: 53.84 km^{2} (20.79 sq mi)
- Elevation: 531 m (1,742 ft)

Population (2025-12-31)
  - Total: 3,513
  - Density: 65.25/km^{2} (169.0/sq mi)
- Time zone: UTC+01:00 (CET)
  - Summer (DST): UTC+02:00 (CEST)
- Postal codes: 83349
- Dialling codes: 08629
- Vehicle registration: TS
- Website: www.palling.de

Palling (German pronunciation: [ˈpalɪŋ]) is a municipality in the district of Traunstein in Bavaria, Germany.
