= Schleierfall =

Waterfall in Austria

Coordinates: 47°32′43″N 12°21′44″E

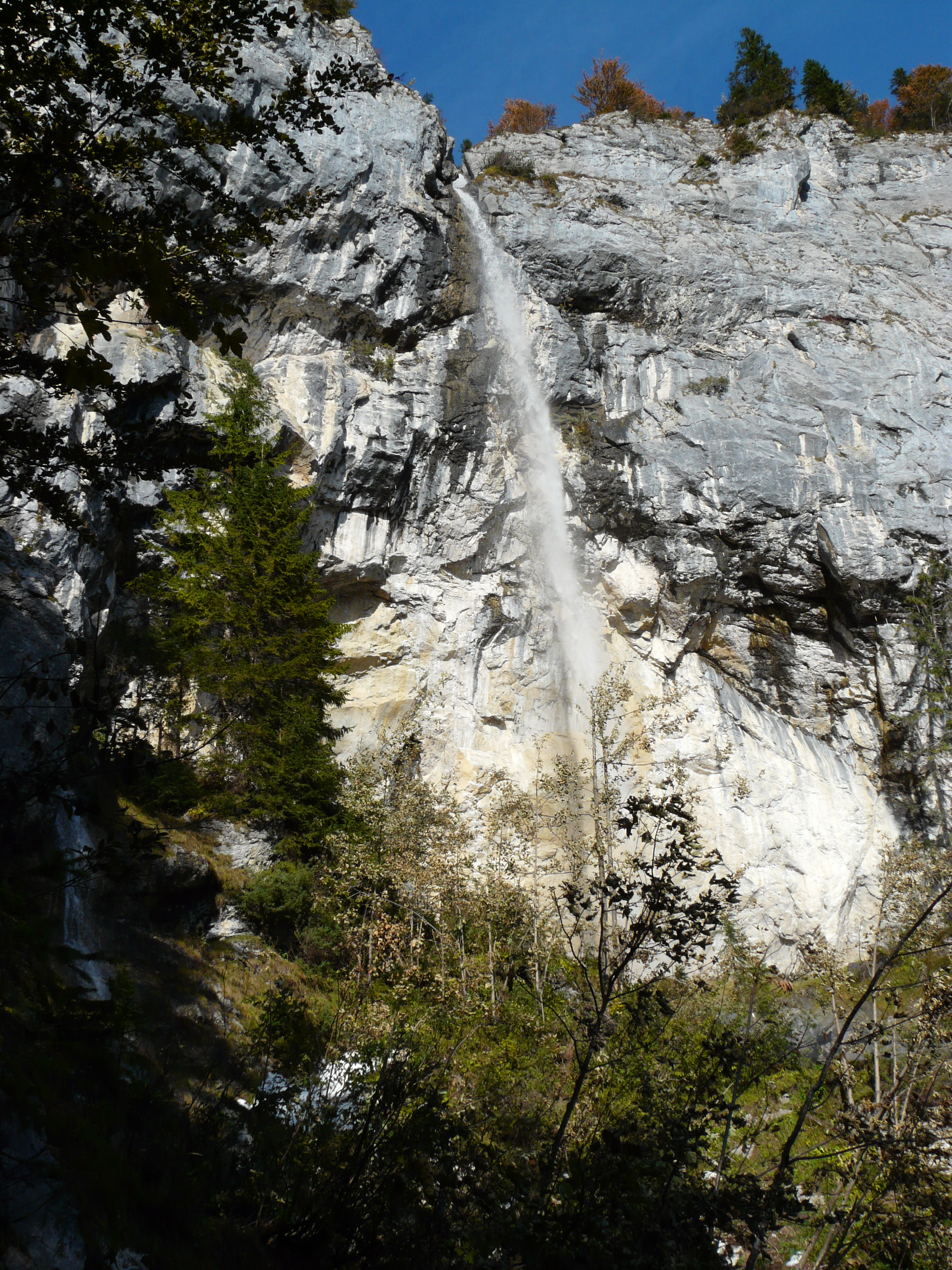
The waterfall in autumn

The Schleier Waterfall or Schleierfall, also called the Schleier, is a waterfall on the Rettenbach stream on the southern side of the Gamskögerl (1,586 m above sea level (AA)) in the Wilder Kaiser mountains of Austria. It is located within the district of Kitzbühel. From the waterfall the Rettenbach forms the boundary between the parishes of Going am Wilden Kaiser and St. Johann in Tirol and discharges in Rettenbach into the Reither Ache river.

== Access and facilities ==
The nearest parking for the waterfall is the free Aschau car park. From there it is about a 45-minute walk for experienced walkers to the falls. As a result of its popularity, the Alpine Club has established an emergency toilet hut at the foot of the waterfall. There are also several benches.

== Schleierwasserfall climbing area ==
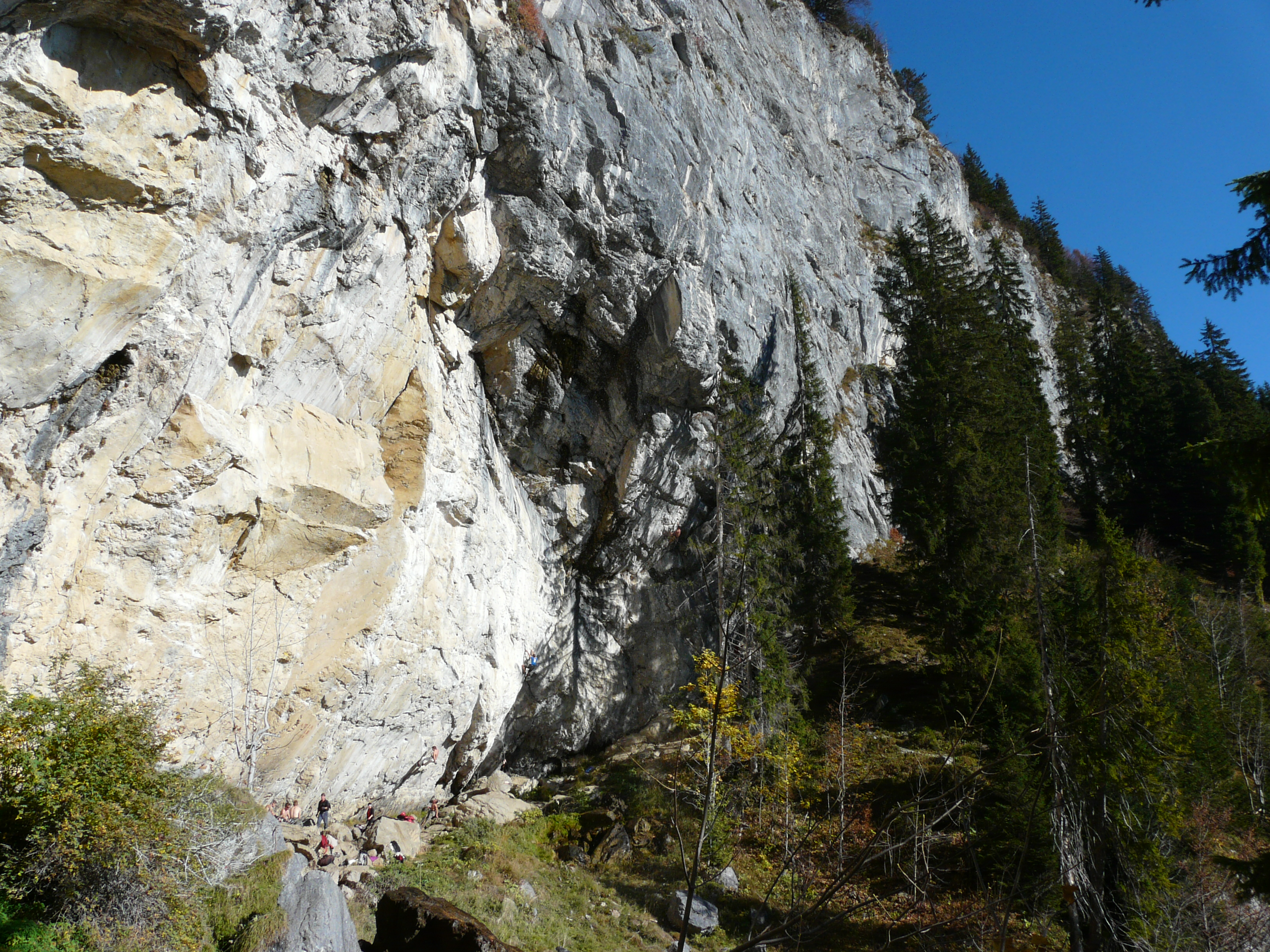
Climbing area at the Schleier waterfall

The 60-metre-high heavily overhanging rock faces next to the waterfall are used by climbers. One particular route, known as Mongo (UIAA grade XI), is currently one of the most difficult climbing routes in the world.
