= Cuvier (disambiguation) =

Georges Cuvier (1769–1832) was a French naturalist and zoologist.

Cuvier may also refer to:

== Places ==
- Cuvier Island, an island in the Hauraki Gulf, New Zealand
- Cuvier, Jura, a commune of the Jura département in France
- Le Bas-Cuvier and Le Cuvier Rempart are rocky climbing areas in Fontainebleau, France.

== Other uses ==
- Cuvier (name)
- Cuvier (crater), a lunar crater
- 9614 Cuvier, a main-belt asteroid

== See also ==
- Cuvier Press Club Building, a historic building in Cincinnati, Ohio
- Cuvier Press Club, housed in the Cuvier Press Club Building
