= Basilica of Saint Mathurin =

Catholic church in northern France

Coordinates: 48°17′02″N 2°35′47″E

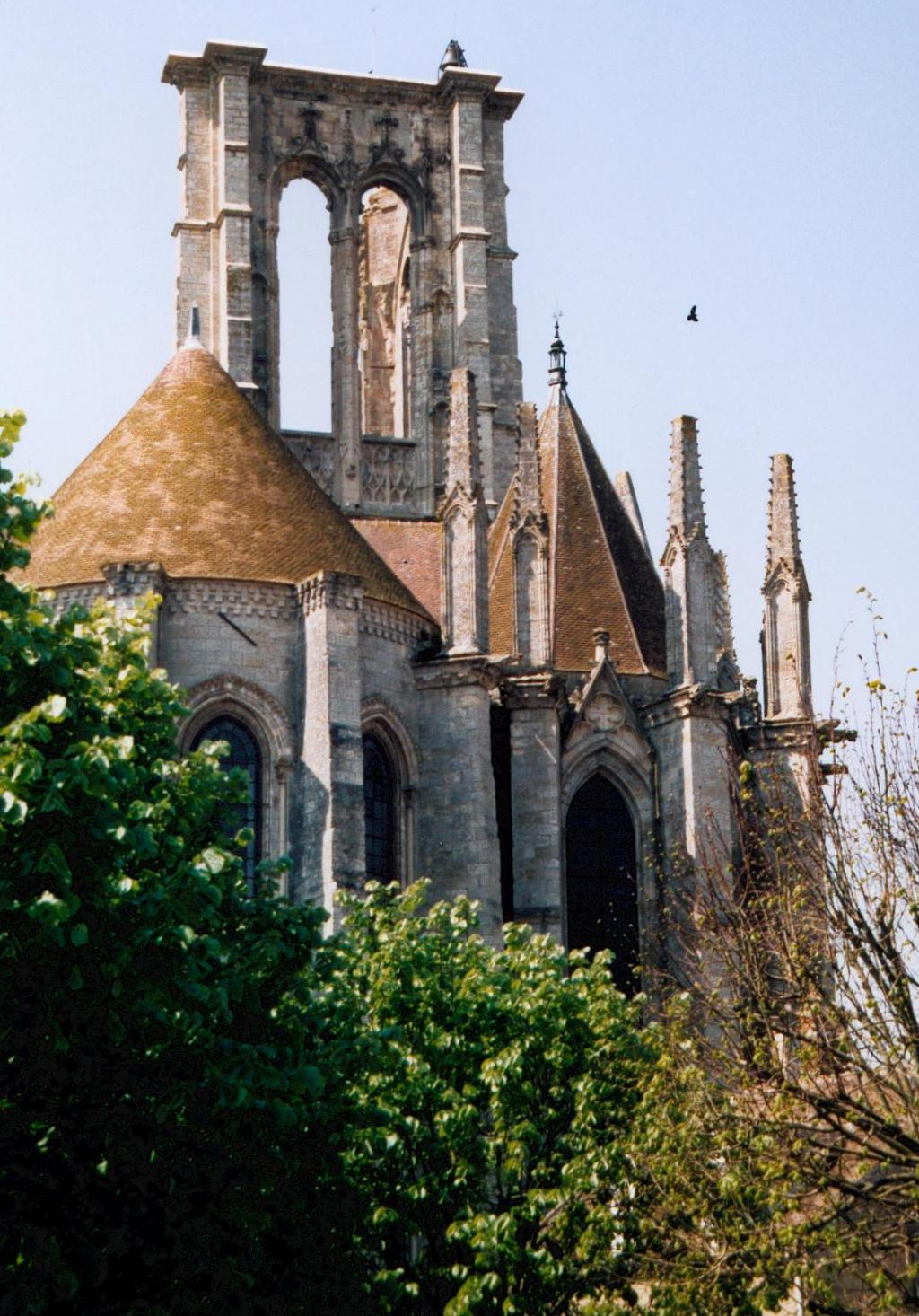
The Basilica of Saint Mathurin

The Basilica of Saint-Mathurin de Larchant is a Catholic church located in Larchant (Seine-et-Marne), France. Although the church is commonly referred to as a basilica, it has not been designated as such by the pope and is therefore not a basilica under church rules for attributing such status.

The basilica was an important pilgrimage destination during the Middle Ages. It served as the center of the cult of Saint Mathurin and attracted, in particular, pilgrims seeking cures for madness or exorcism for the possessed.

The building was classified as a historical monument in 1846.

== History ==
=== The legend of Saint Mathurin ===
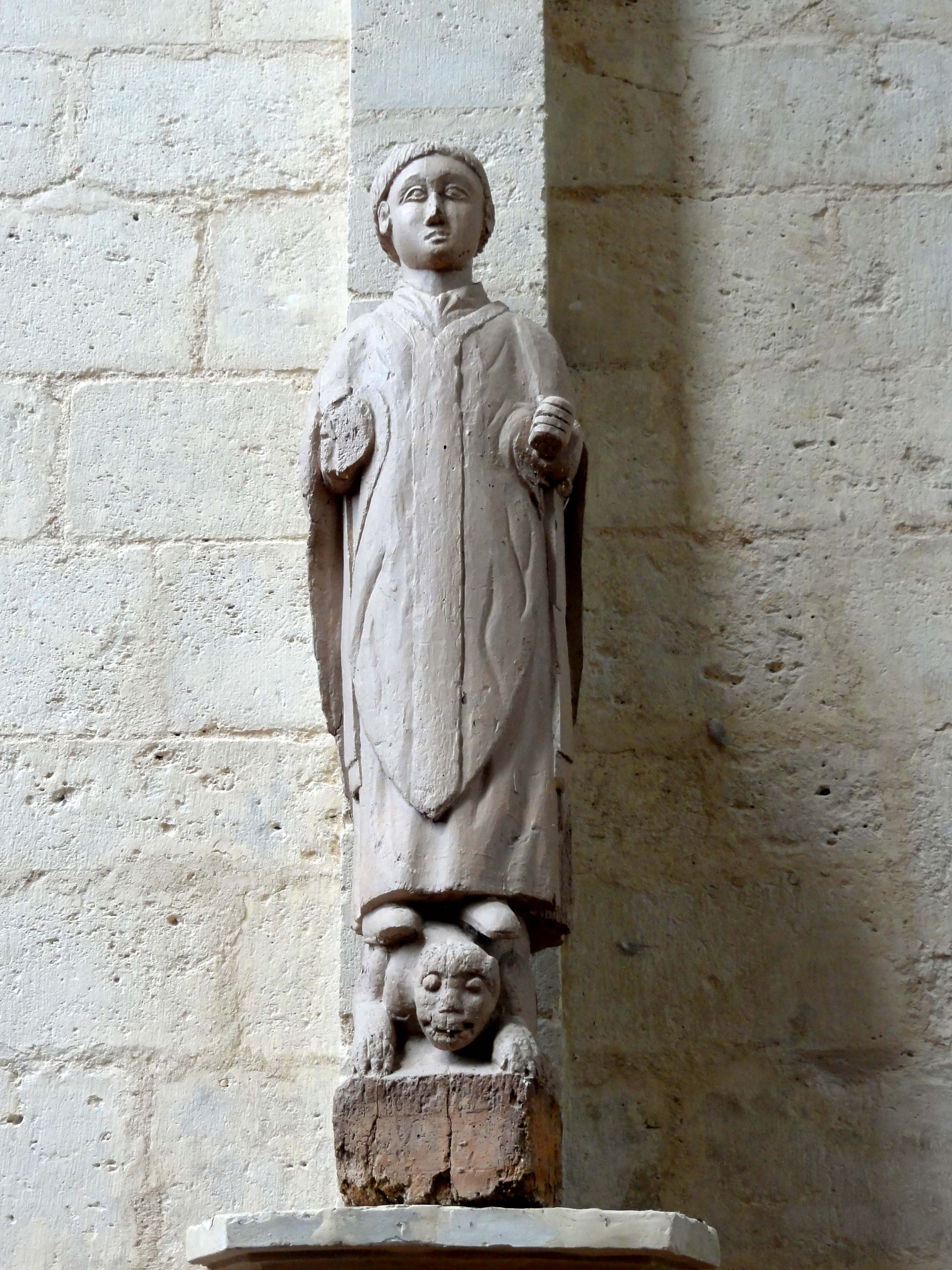
A damaged thirteenth century statue of Saint Mathurin

The church is dedicated to Saint Mathurin. A 10th-century manuscript provides an account of his life. According to his legend, he was born in Larchant at the end of the 3rd century to pagan parents. Mathurin had been initiated into the Catholic faith by Bishop Polycarp. He was ordained a priest at the age of twenty. At the time, Rome was stricken with various evils and the step-daughter of Emperor Maximian Hercules was tormented by a demon, who demanded that the Emperor bring from Gaul a holy man named Mathurin in order to perform an exorcism. The Emperor sent men to find Mathurin and to bring him to Rome.^{,}

While in Rome, Mathurin is said to have cured the sick and exorcised the devil who had been tormenting the emperor's step-daughter, Theodora. He remained in Rome for three years, performing many miracles. He died there on the Calends of November (November 1). Acceding to Mathurin’s request that his body be returned to his native village, the Emperor provided an escort to bring back Mathurin's body to Larchant. On his tomb, many miracles are said to have occurred and these were at the origin of a very important pilgrimage to Larchant in the Middle Ages.

=== Donation to the chapter of Notre Dame de Paris ===
Elisabeth Le Riche, daughter of Lisiard Le Riche, inherited Larchant from her father around 950. At the beginning of the 11th century, in agreement with her son Renaud de Vendôme, bishop of Paris, she gave Larchant to the chapter of Notre-Dame Cathedral of Paris. The destiny of Larchant and its church was then inextricably linked to that of Notre Dame. Having become lord of Larchant, the chapter of Notre Dame played a primordial role there, especially in relation to the church. The French Revolution in 1789 put an end to this arrangement.

=== Pilgrimage ===
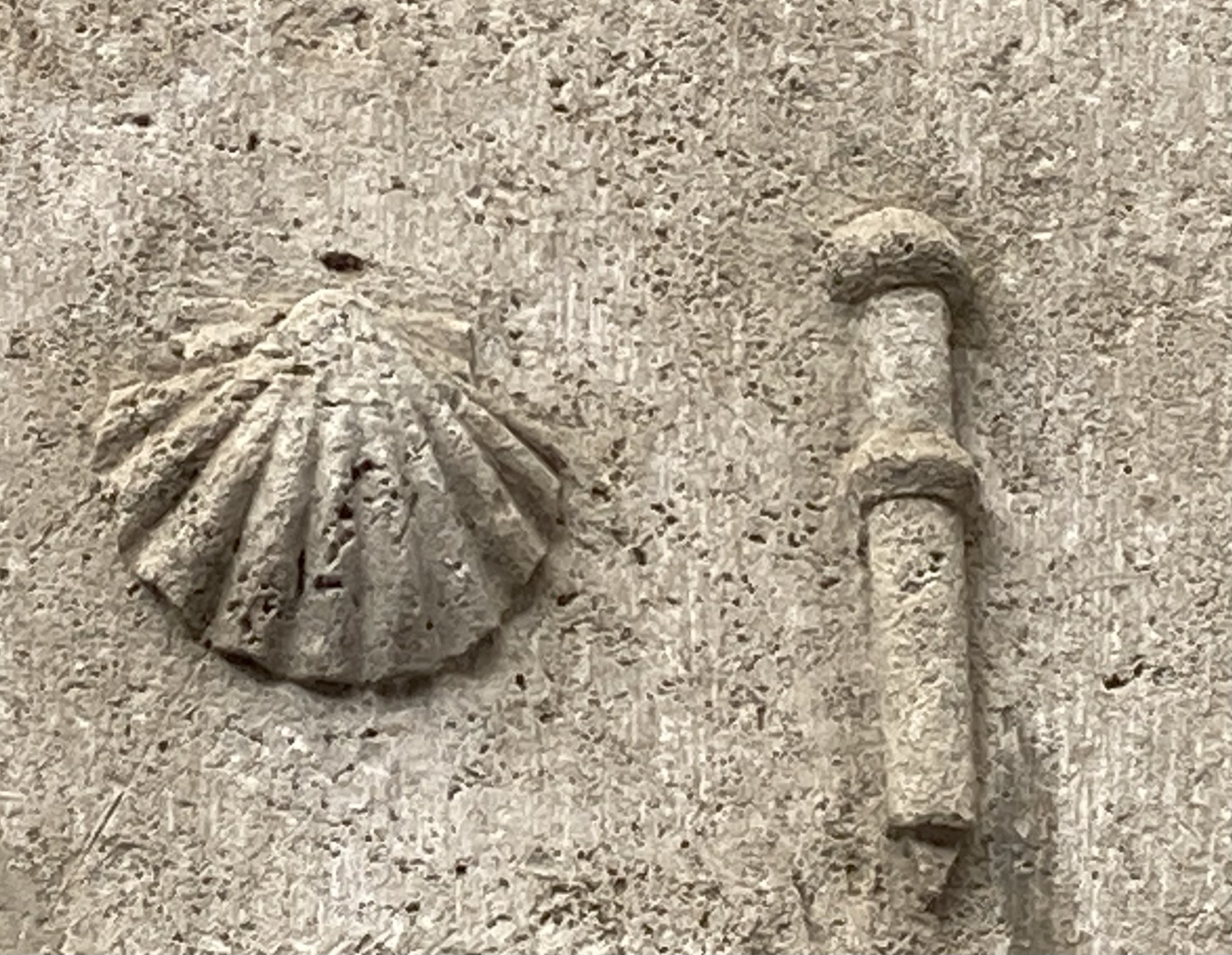
Scallop shell and pilgrim’s staff on the Pilgrim’s Lodge in Larchant

This pilgrimage developed in the Middle Ages and, for centuries, was one of the principal pilgrimages. In 1324, it flourished to such an extent that the canons used part of the pilgrims’ offerings to meet the needs of the clerics of Notre-Dame de Paris. The reputation of Larchant developed during the Middle Ages, and Larchant and Saint Mathurin feature in several songs of the period.

The throng of pilgrims made it necessary to build a much larger church. People came to ask for the intercession of Saint Mathurin for the healing of the insane and the possessed. The old route du Midi (road to the south of France) passed near the village and many pilgrims on their way to Santiago de Compostela stopped there to contemplate Mathurin’s relics.

Several kings made pilgrimages to Larchant: Charles IV in 1325, Louis XI in 1467, Charles VIII in 1486, François 1er in 1519 and 1541, Henri II in 1551, Henri III in 1587 and Henri IV in 1599.^{,}

The pilgrimage peaked towards the end of the Middle Ages. It disappeared after the Revolution. Some priests and faithful tried to revive it at the beginning of the 20th century. The tradition was resumed after the war of 1914 and a ceremony still takes place on Whit Monday to honor Saint Mathurin.

=== Physical damage ===
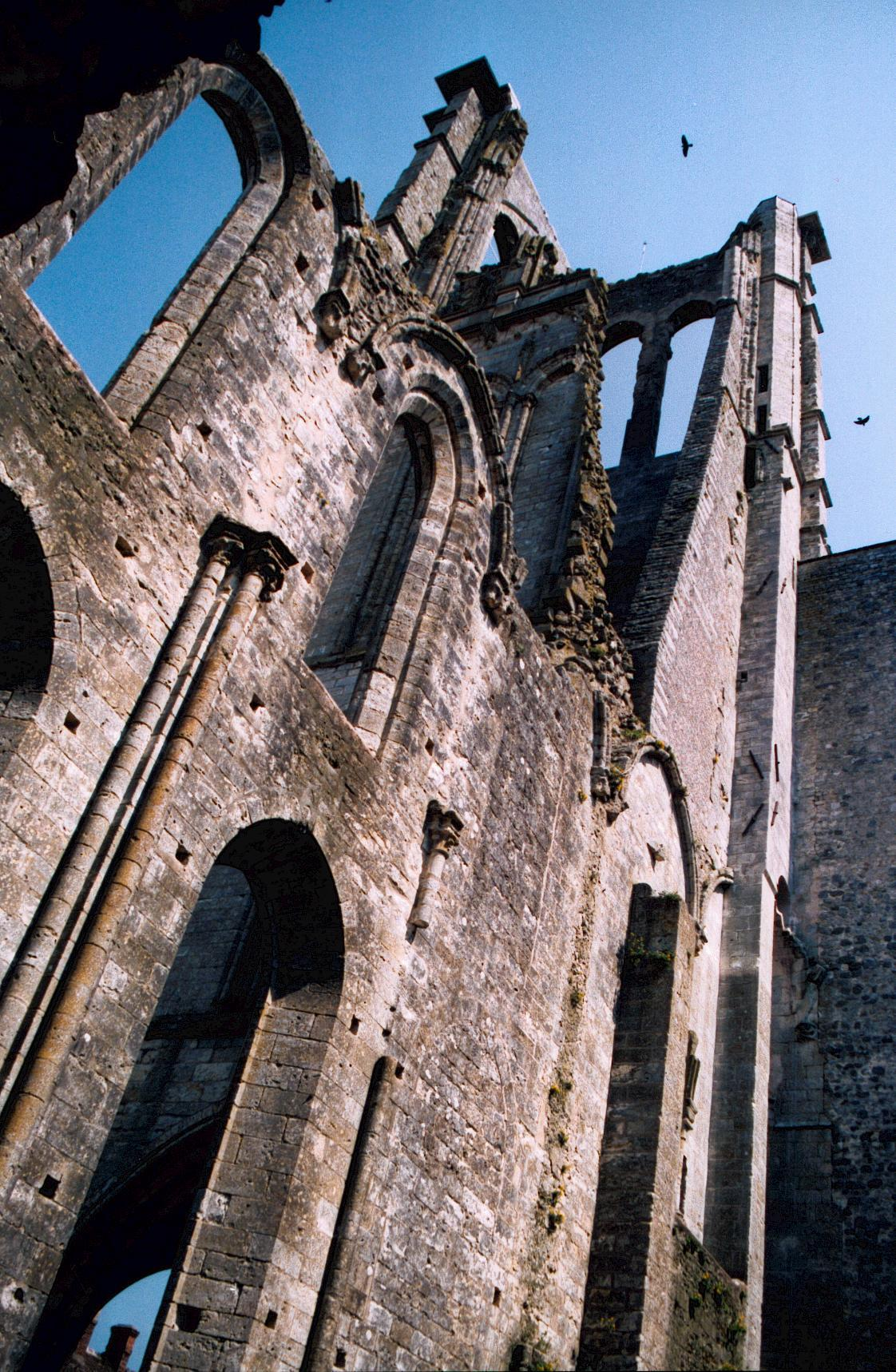
View of the damaged church

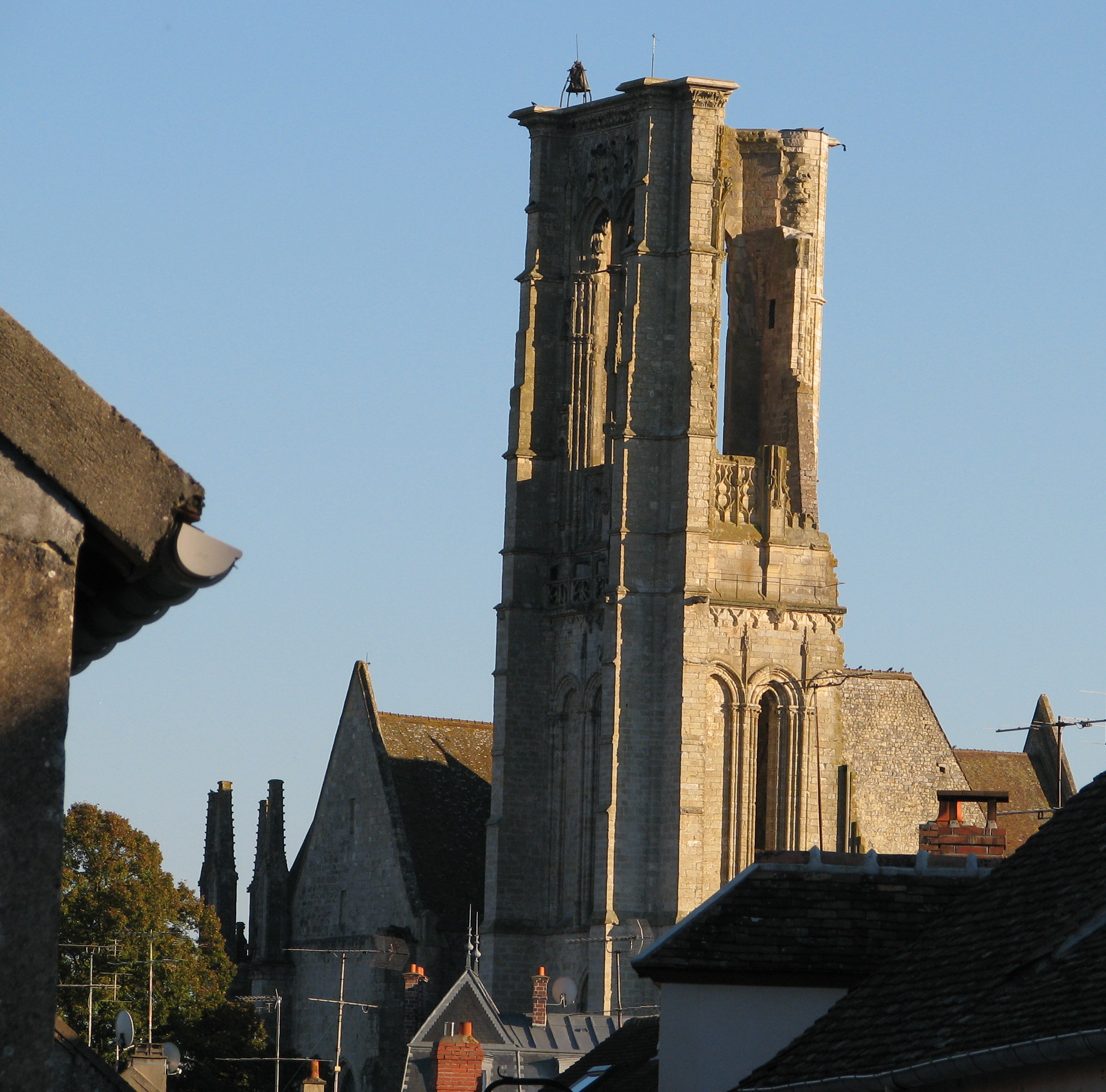
View showing the damaged tower

The church suffered numerous vicissitudes over the centuries, including fire and damage inflicted by severe storms as well as by marauding armies. Irremediable damage took place during the wars of religion. In October 1567, Guillaume de Beaumont, Chevalier du Boulay (a place near Nemours) snuck into the village at night at the head of 100 armed men and plundered the relics and pillaged the church. The following year, the Comte de Montgomery burned down the church and the village, causing damage which is visible to this day. In 1608, a storm damaged the roof and the stained glass windows; in 1652, the village and the church were pillaged by the troops of the Baron of Entragues; in 1654, a strong wind destroyed half of the roof; and, in 1674, lightning destroyed the attic of the nave.^{:17}Another major disaster occurred on 25 September 1675, with the collapse of the northwest pillar of the great tower, which fell into and destroyed part of the nave.^{:16,}

Various attempts were made to repair this extensive damage, but the great expense entailed by this project meant that progress was slow. In 1585, the decision was taken to abandon half of the nave in order to cut costs, resulting in the wall, still visible today, that splits the church in two.

These events ushered in a long period of decline. Pilgrims were rare and Larchant became a simple agricultural village. The stones from the ruins of the nave were put up for sale in 1827 and the church was saved only by the fact that its demolition would have been so difficult.^{:17}

A major restoration campaign took place at the beginning of the 20th century, under the direction of the architect Albert Bray. In the early 1980s, a new campaign to restore the church was launched, under the impetus of the Cultural Association of Larchant and with the support of State, regional and municipal governments.^{:18-21}

=== Listed historic monument, but not a basilica ===
The church was listed as a historic monument by Prosper Mérimée in the mid-19th century. Although the church is routinely referred to as a basilica, it is not considered a basilica by the Catholic Church because it has not been the object of a papal brief naming it as a 'minor' or 'lesser' basilica.'

== Architecture ==
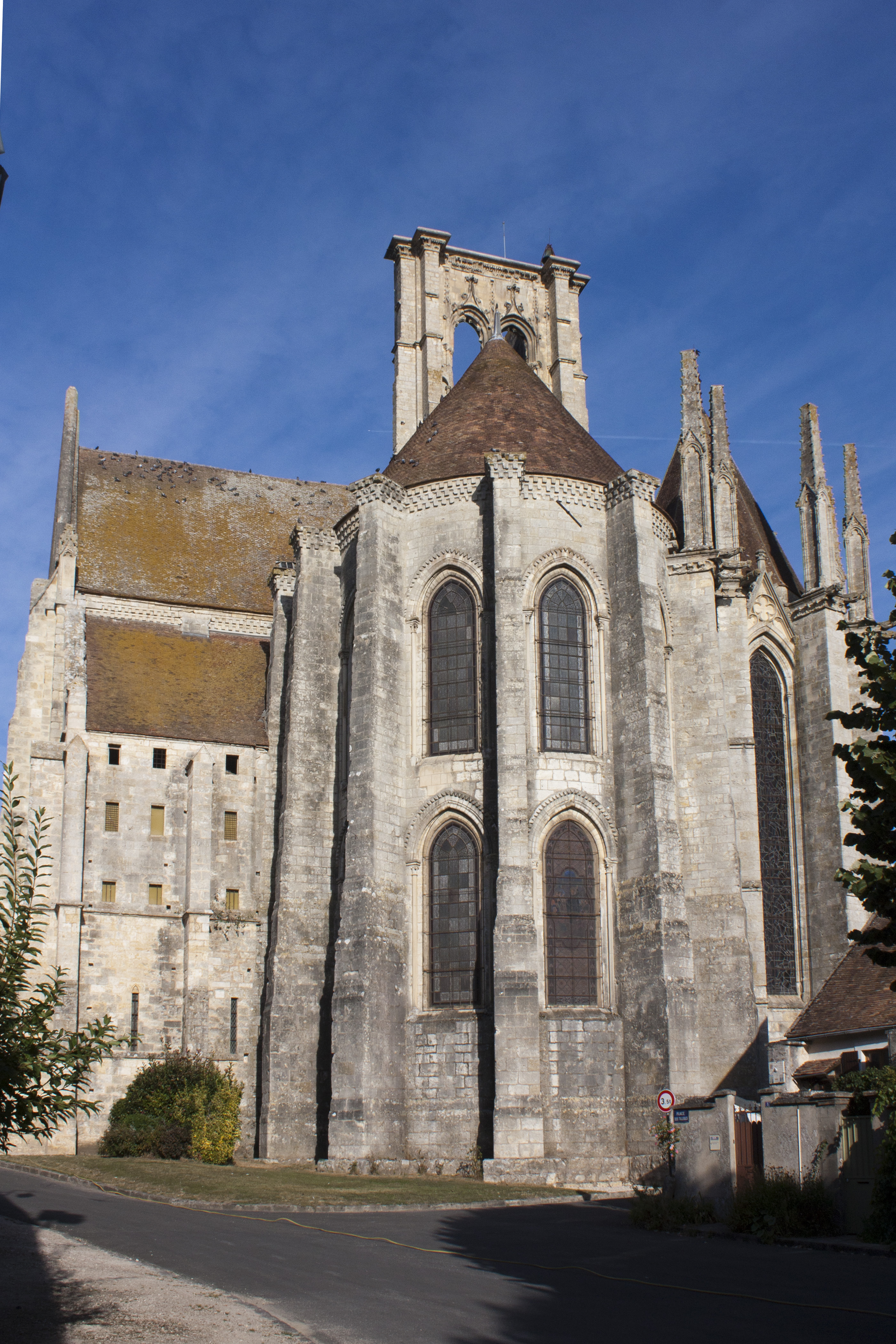
Chevet of the church

The basilica is one of the jewels of Gothic architecture in Île-de-France. Construction work took place over more than three centuries, from the end of the twelfth century to the beginning of the sixteenth century. The dimensions of the building are: total interior length (including the ruined nave): 57 meters, length of the transept: 29 meters, height of the vaults: 18 meters, height of the tower: 50 meters.

=== Interior ===
The church is entered through the side doors of the transept. The choir is composed of a single bay, in the extension of the apse on a semi-circular plan. The interior was originally lit by two rows of high, wide windows, framed by molded archivolts on small columns. The facades of the transept are each lit by three high windows.

=== Exterior ===
On the exterior of the church, the apse has sturdy buttresses which give stability to the structure and allow the implementation of the so-called "thin wall" technique which lends great elegance to the church’s interior. This powerful architecture was modified in the 15th century when the chapel of the Virgin and the sacristy were built on either side. The polygonal chapel of the Virgin Mary presents high windows adorned with gables which once supported statues. The presence of ornate pinnacles and gargoyles represents a departure from the sobriety of the early Gothic style that characterizes the apse.

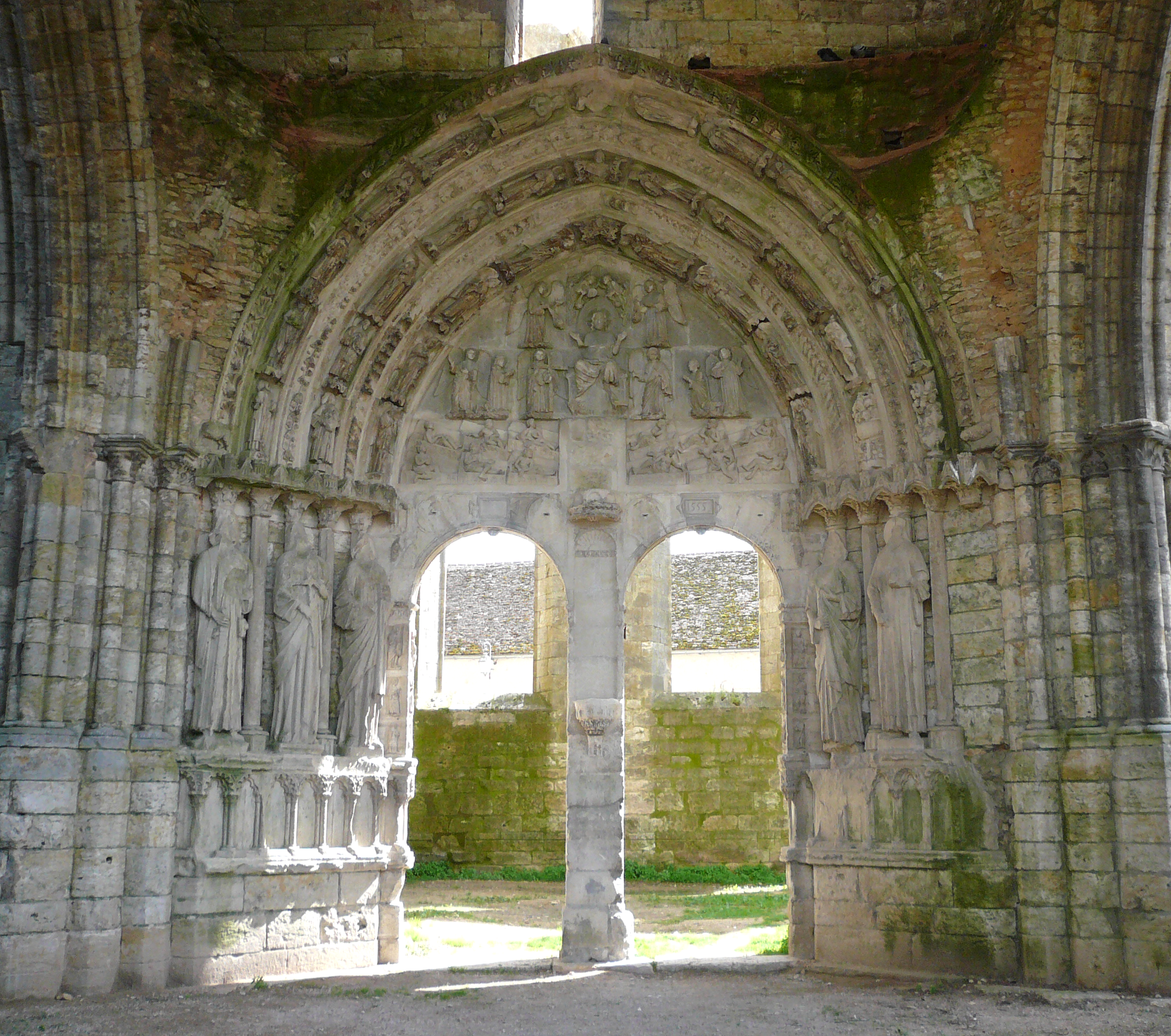
North portal with a tympanum depicting the Last Judgment

The nave opens through a portal, now damaged, which was at one time the entrance to the church, before the construction of the great tower. Construction of the massive bell tower began in the early 13th century, but was not completed until the 15th century. The ground floor of the tower is an open porch on three sides. It is made up of huge pillars supporting the arches of the vault, which has now disappeared. Above rise the three floors of the tower. The two north and east facades are intact, while the western facade is badly damaged and the southern one has completely collapsed.^{:22-43}

=== The Portal of the Last Judgment ===
Under the porch is a tympanum depicting the Last Judgment. Christ sits on high and in the center, surrounded by four angels carrying thuribles (incense urns), with one also holding the sun and another the moon. To the left and the right of Christ, two angels hold the attributes of the passion: the lance and nails. Next to these angels are the crowned Mother Mary (to the left) and Saint John (to the right). Underneath, the dead rise from their coffins to face judgment.

On each side of the portal are sculpted columns with figures of saints that have been decapitated by vandals, probably during the attacks of 1567-1568. The figures are thought to be, on the left, Saint James with his basket full of scallop shells, Saint Andrew with his cross, and Saint Peter with his book of epistles. On the right (from left to right) two of the figures are Saint Paul with his book of epistles, Saint Étienne with a palm frond and a book of the gospels. The third figure has been missing for centuries.

Also visible for someone standing in front of the portal are small bas-reliefs representing the months of the year in terrestrial life. On the left are: January (a man seated at a table); February (a man in front of a fireplace); March (a man pruning grapevines). To the right are: October (a man sowing seed); November (gathering of chesnuts); and December (a man butchering a pig). The missing months were eliminated in 1490 during a modification of the portal.^{:38-43}
