= Maturinus =

Gallo-Roman exorcist and missionary

Saint Maturinus
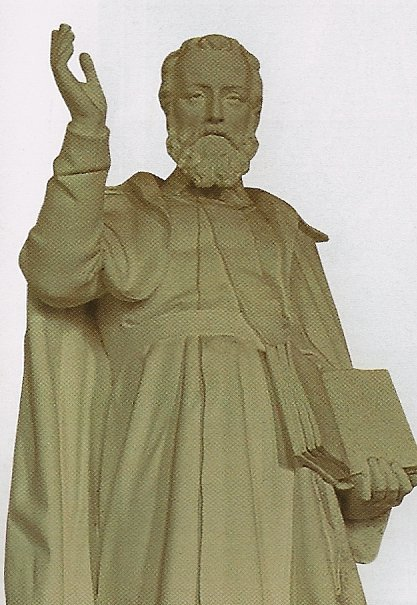
- Statue of Saint Maturinus. Church of Tessy-sur-Vire.

Missionary
- Born: Larchant
- Died: ~300 AD; Rome
- Venerated in: Roman Catholic Church, Eastern Orthodox Church
- Feast: November 1
- Patronage: comic actors, jesters, and clowns, as well as the patron saint of sailors (in Brittany), of tinmen (in Paris) and of plumbers; invoked against mental illness and infertility.

Maturinus, or Mathurin (died c. 300 AD) was a Gallo-Roman exorcist and missionary venerated as a saint.

The first source to mention Maturinus is the Martyrology of Usuard, written in 875. In the next century, a biography of Maturinus was composed.

== Life ==
According to his legend, Maturinus was born in Liricantus (now Larchant). His parents, Marinus and Euphemia, were pagan. His father was entrusted by Maximian with the task of exterminating the Christians of the region.

His son Maturinus, however, was secretly baptized by Polycarp, when the boy was twelve. According to legend, he began to perform miracles, drive out demons, and calm rowdy or riotous individuals. He eventually converted his parents to Christianity.

He became a priest at the age of twenty, and took care of the diocese when the local bishop went to Rome.

His fame grew, and emperor Maximian himself requested that he come to Rome so that his stepdaughter Flavia Maximiana Theodora, who had been possessed by an evil spirit, could be cured by the saint. The demon in Theodora's body was expelled. Maturinus lived for three more years in Rome, interceding with the emperor on behalf of persecuted Christians. He died on November 1, and was buried in a Roman cemetery. However, Maturinus miraculously indicated that he wished to be buried in Larchant; his body was taken to Sens and then to Larchant.

== Veneration ==
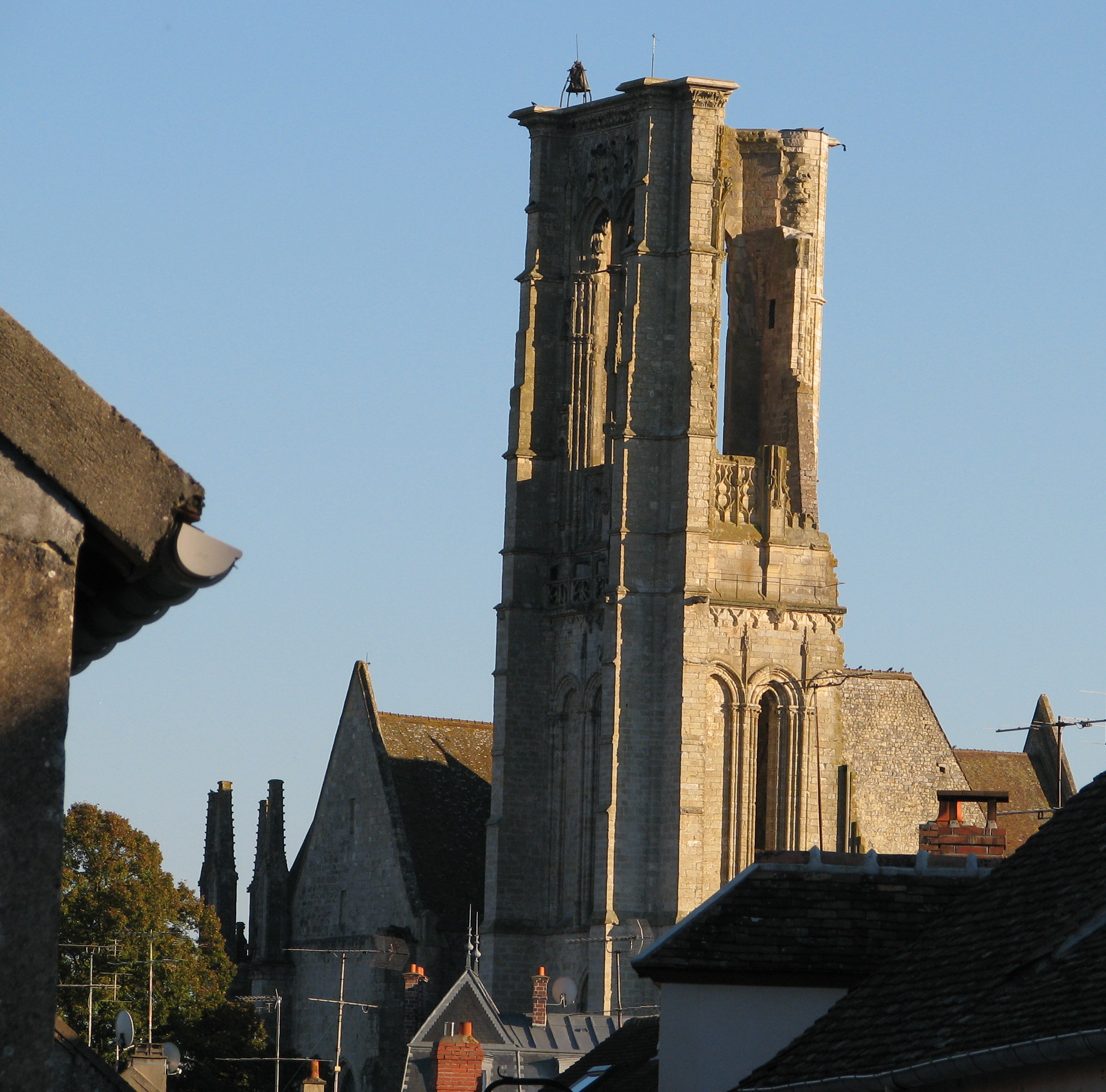
Basilica of Saint Mathurin in Larchant

Maturinus' relics were kept at the Basilica of Saint-Mathurin, Larchant, as well as in the church of Saint-Mathurin in Paris, situated in the Latin Quarter. Saint-Mathurin de Larchant, a property of the chapter of Notre-Dame de Paris since 1005, was rebuilt beginning in 1153, and the church became a popular pilgrimage site, which Harry Bailey, host of the Tabard Inn of Chaucer's Canterbury Tales was recalling, when he swore "by that precious corpus Madrian". Both Louis XI and Henry IV visited the church. In Patricia Highsmith's novel The Boy Who Followed Ripley (1980), the two principal characters visit the basilica en route to an outing in the Forest of Fontainebleau.

Maturinus’ cult became popular during the Middle Ages. He was invoked against mental illness and infertility, and the faculty of medicine of the University of Paris kept their great seal safely in the Church of Saint-Mathurin. Due to his association with madness and mental illness, he also became the patron saint of comic actors, jesters, and clowns. He was also the patron saint of sailors (in Brittany), of tinmen (in Paris), and of plumbers.

In France, Trinitarian friars were known in France as “Mathurins”; this is because the Trinitarians were based in the church of Saint-Mathurin in Paris from 1228 onwards.

His relics were destroyed by the Huguenots.

== See also ==
- Basilica of Saint Mathurin
- Larchant
