= Fontainebleau rock climbing =

Bouldering area in France

Fontainebleau
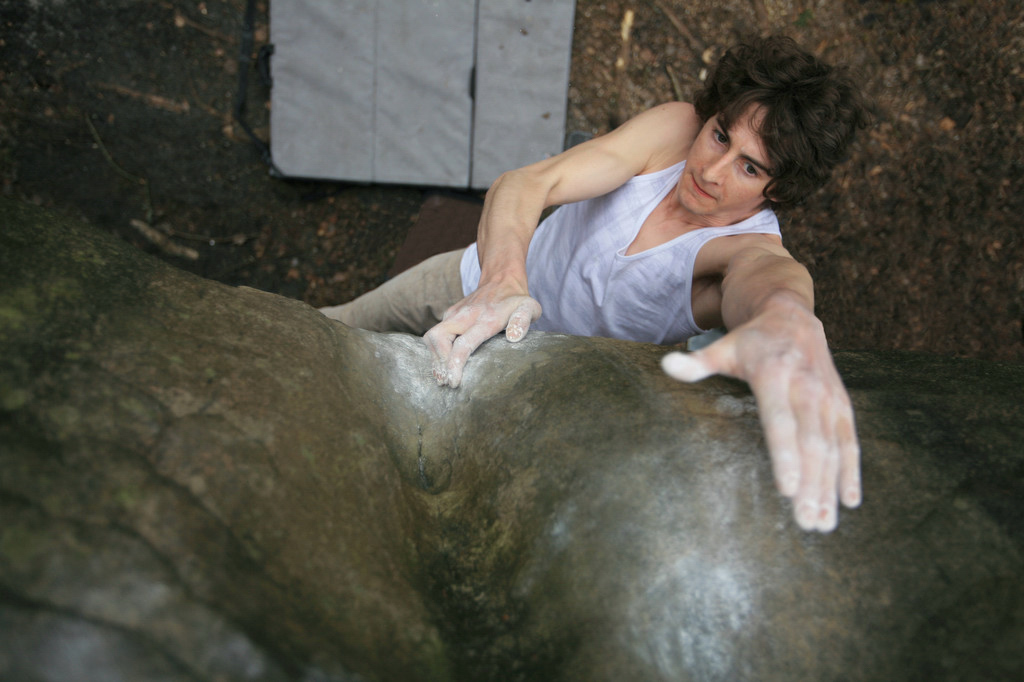
- Dave Graham bouldering in Fontainebleau

- Location within France
- Nearest city: Paris
- Coordinates: 48.41°N 2.62°E
- Type of climbing: Bouldering
- Rock type: Sandstone

The region around Fontainebleau in France is particularly famous for its concentrated bouldering areas. French alpine climbers practiced bouldering there since the 19th century. It remains today a prime climbing location. It is the biggest and most developed bouldering area in the world, and is where the Font grade originated.

== History ==
At the end of the 1800s, Aldolphe Joanne, the president of the Club Alpin Français, invited foreign visitors to visit the sites of Franchard and Apremont. In 1900, the Club Alpin Français organised a meet to ascend "the Gorges d'Apremont range" and then go to Larchant, whose huge rocks constitute the "usual practicing area of the Paris Section of CAF."

Several Bleau boulders or routes are named after famous climbers of the beginning of the 20th century: Prestat, Wehrlin, Maunoury, Gaché, Labour, Paillon, Souverain, and the famous Pierre Allain, the inventor of the smooth-sole climbing shoe (named P.A. from his initials). Before World War II, most of the areas that are popular today were already well known to Parisian climbers, except for Les Trois Pignons, which was not easily accessible by public transport.

At the time, people would climb in Fontainebleau primarily to train for mountain climbing. Thus, the 1936 French expedition to the Karakoram included several Bleausards (Bleau climbers). Bleausards Robert Paragot, Lucien Bérardini and René Ferlet made the first ascent of the South Face of Aconcagua in 1954.

Initially, there were no formalised routes; climbers would choose the most remarkable boulders, aiming for the highest and most committing ones, as a preparation for the mountains.

The first guidebook appeared in 1945, written by Maurice Martin, providing a map of blocks and routes with their names and ratings. The first painted route was created in 1947 by Fred Bernick in the Cuvier Rempart area, followed by routes at Les Gorges d'Apremont painted by Pierre Mercier in 1952. The standardisation of route colour by difficulty (Yellow = PD, Orange = AD, Blue = D, Red = TD, Black = ED, White = ED+) dates back to the 1980s.

In 1984, French climber Jacky Godoffe established the first 8A in Fontainebleau when he climbed C'était demain at Cuvier Rempart. In 1998, Cathy Miquel became the first woman to solve an 8A (V11) boulder problem when she climbed the Duel.

Today, most Bleau climbing areas are owned by the French state and managed by the Office National des Forêts, in cooperation with the local governments and with climbers' federations.

== Geography ==
Climbing and spotting in Bleau (95.2 area in les Trois Pignons)

The Fontainebleau climbing areas are located in a forested area south of Paris. They are colloquially known as "Font" to English speakers, and as Bleau in France. They are located mostly within the Forêt Domaniale (National Forest) de Fontainebleau, near the town of Fontainebleau, des Trois Pignons (near Milly-la-Forêt) and de la Commanderie (near Larchant).

Some of the major areas are:

- Le Cul de Chien and La Canche aux Merciers in les Trois Pignons
- le Cuvier (Bas-Cuvier, Cuvier Rempart) and les Gorges d'Apremont in Forêt de Fontainebleau
- La Dame Jouanne and l'Éléphant at Larchant, in Forêt de la Commanderie

Although at a farther distance, the climbing areas of Beauvais (Nainville-les-Roches, north of Milly), Nemours, Buthiers-Malesherbes (west of Larchant) and Chamarande are similar and are considered part of Bleau.

== Geology ==
The boulders in Fontainebleau are erosive remnants from the Oligocene age, relatively young in geological terms. Their appearance may have been accentuated by localised mineralisation (silicification) of the sandstone rock, forming large nodules.

== Route grading and marking ==
Two complementary grading systems are in use.

- The adjectival system ("difficulté" in French guidebooks), going from F (Facile, easy) to ED+ (Extrêmement Difficile Supérieur, Extremely Difficult Higher), applies to a whole route. It measures the overall difficulty and danger of the route. (An easy route with a single hard move is graded lower than one where the hardest move is the same, but many moves are hard or unprotected.)
- The numerical system ("cotation" in French), ranging from 1a to 9A, that measures the difficulty of a single boulder or move. The numerical grade of a route used to be the grade of the whole route's most difficult move, but no longer, due to the difficulty of linking several difficult moves obviously being a factor.

This is now widely used also in other bouldering areas around the world. However, the Bleau grades are generally more severe; thus an 8A route outside of Bleau is significantly easier than an 8A boulder problem in Bleau.

=== Route paint marks ===
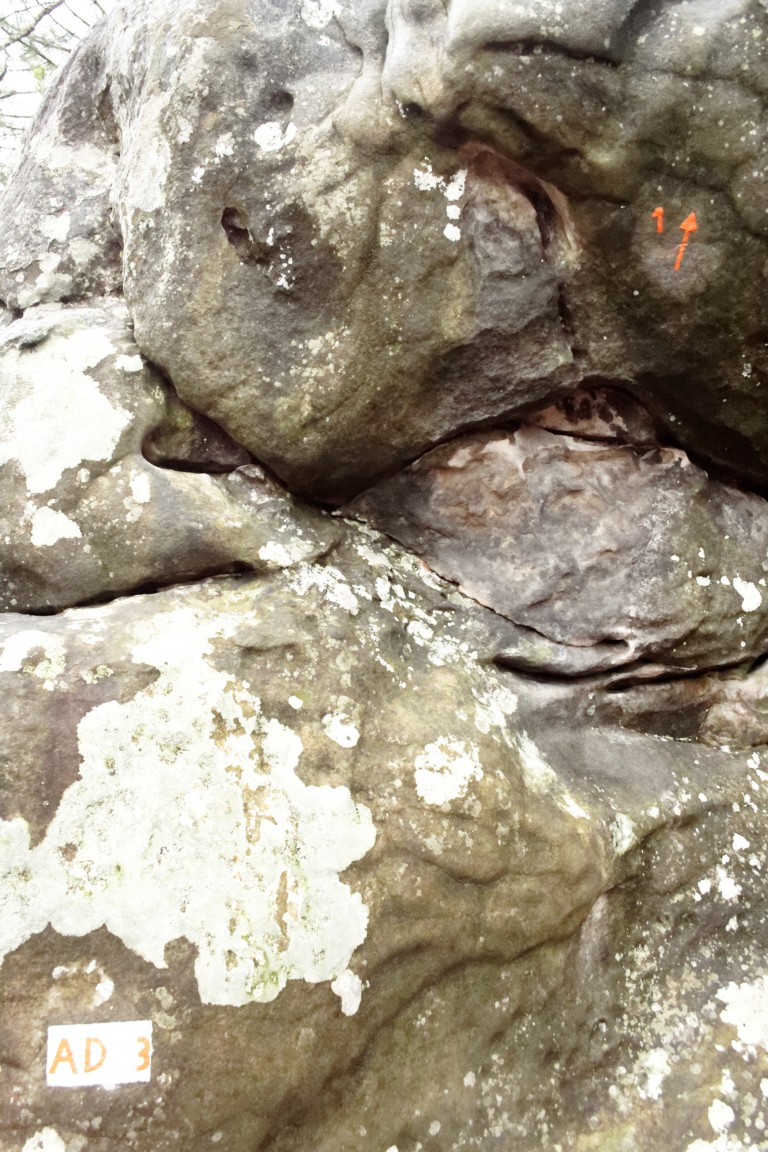
First rock (départ) of AD route #3 (Roche aux Fées area, Trois Pignons), and move #1

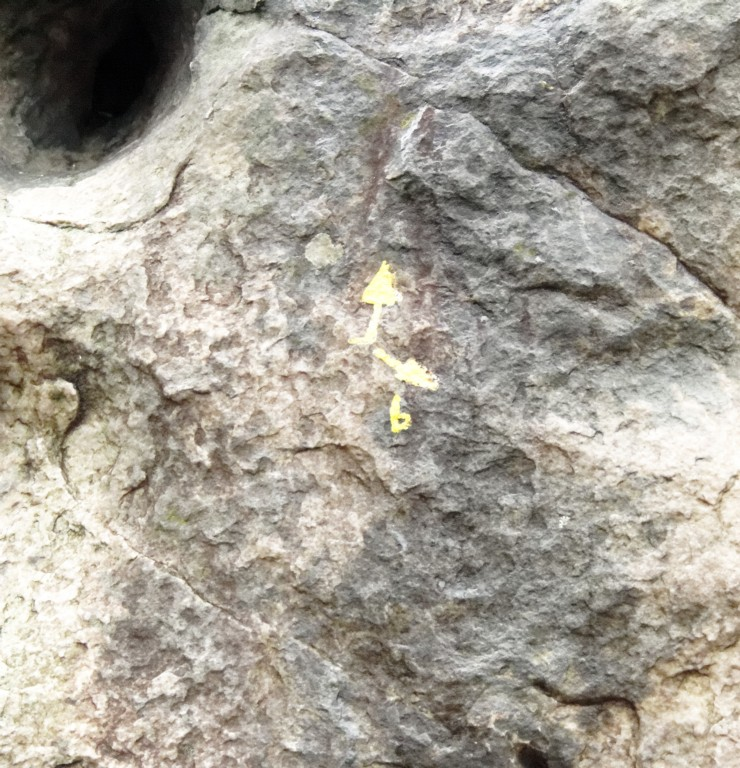
Normal move (upward-pointing arrow) and alternative (bis, right-pointing arrow marked "b")

General direction of the next rock

Jump

"Arrivée": last rock of a route (Pignon Poteau)

The typical Bleau landscape is a "chaos" of rocks (no more than a few meters high) spread over a sandy plain. A climbing route threads its way from boulder to boulder.

Routes (circuits in French) are numbered within the restricted area (say, within Les Gorges d'Apremont). Routes are colour-coded according to their adjectival grade:

| Colour | Abbreviation | Adjective | Translation | Typical Numeric |
|---|---|---|---|---|
| White | Enf. | Enfants | Children | none |
| Violet, Salmon, Light Green, ... | F | Facile | Easy | 1–2 |
| Yellow | PD | Peu difficile | Little Difficult | 2–3 |
| Orange | AD | Assez difficile | Fairly Difficult | 3–4 |
| Blue | D | Difficile | Difficult | 4–5 |
| Red | TD | Très difficile | Very difficult | 5–6 |
| Black or White or fluorescent pink | ED | Extrêmement difficile | Extremely difficult | 6-7 |

(The Translation column is a literal translation of the French adjective; do not assume any relation to any other grading system.)

A small number of routes have retained their historical, non-standard colour, notably at Les Gorges d'Apremont (La bleue outremer = marine blue) and La Dame Jouanne (La mauve = purple). All the boulders used along a given route are marked the same colour. The difficulty of each individual move can be found in guidebooks.

The first rock of the route (le départ) carries a white painted rectangle inscribed with the route number and its grading (e.g. AD+) in the appropriate colour (orange in this example). On each individual boulder, an arrow indicates the general direction of climb. Problem boulders are numbered in sequence (number 1 is typically the boulder after the départ); easier, transition boulders are marked with an unnumbered arrow. Alternative problems are marked with an arrow and a b (bis) or a t (ter), or with a small triangle (variante). Where the same route crosses a boulder twice, the first arrow is marked A (aller) and the second R (retour). The final boulder is marked with a circled A (arrivée).

The body is positioned such that the arrow is at navel level. Generally, all holds within reasonable reach are allowed; occasionally, a forbidden hold may be indicated by a dashed line. A lone dot indicates a suggested foothold. A dot within a broken circle indicates a jump. A dot with a triangle indicates the general direction of the next boulder.

Some routes, called parcours montagne, intended to emulate a mountain route, are bi-directional and are indicated by a line rather than an arrow. Very few of these remain; there is one, for instance, at Franchard-Cuisinière.

== See also ==
- The Buttermilks, major bouldering area in California
- History of rock climbing
