= Larchant =

Town in northern France

- Commune
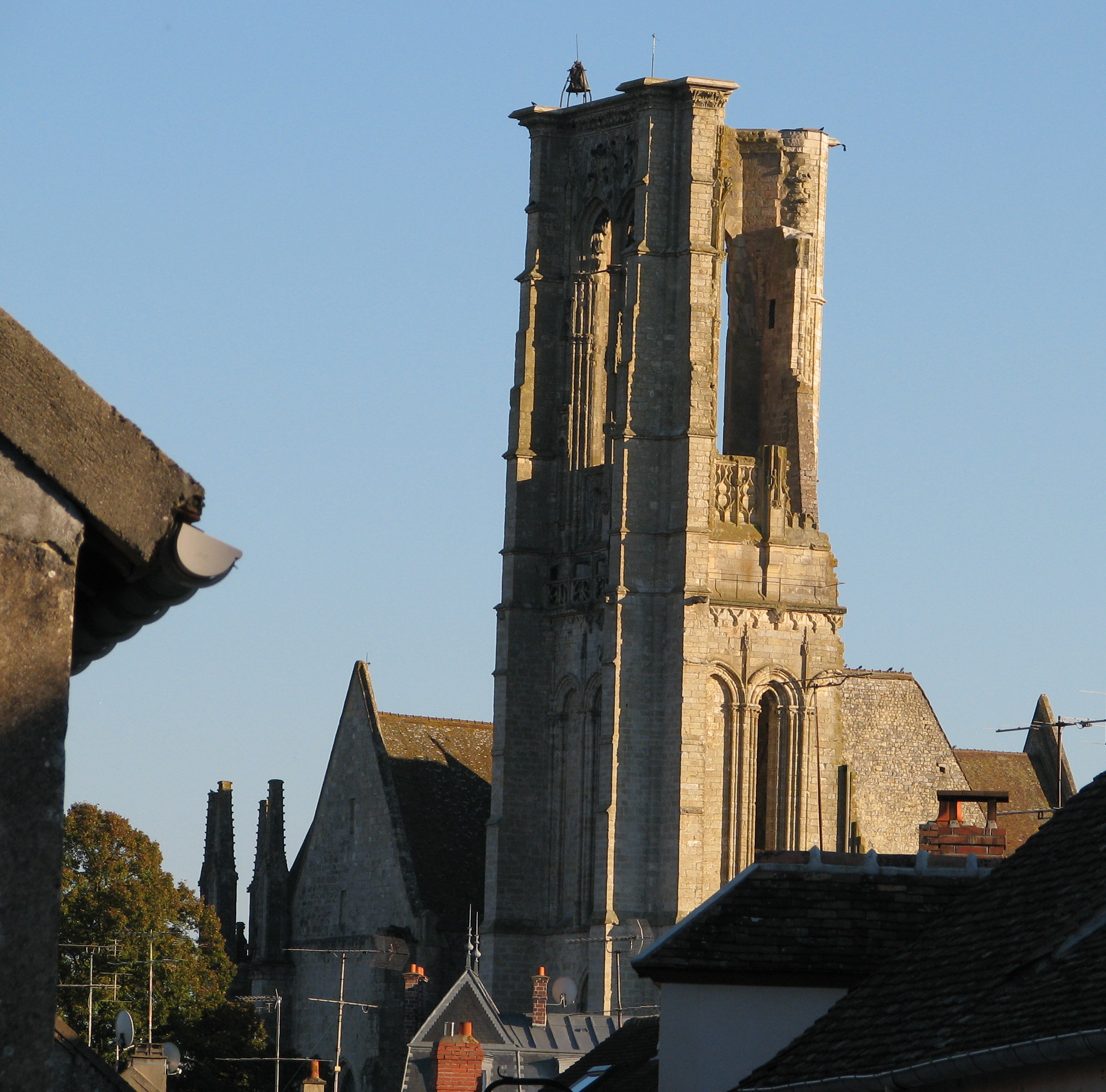
- The basilica of Saint Mathurin
- Location of Larchant
- Location within France Location within Île-de-France (region)
- Coordinates: 48°17′06″N 2°35′51″E
- Country: France
- Region: Île-de-France
- Department: Seine-et-Marne
- Arrondissement: Fontainebleau
- Canton: Nemours

Government
  - Mayor (2020–2026): Vincent Mevel
- Area^{1}: 29.24 km^{2} (11.29 sq mi)
- Highest elevation: 141 m (463 ft)
- Lowest elevation: 62 m (203 ft)
- Population (2023): 730
  - Density: 25/km^{2} (65/sq mi)
- Time zone: UTC+01:00 (CET)
  - Summer (DST): UTC+02:00 (CEST)
- INSEE/Postal code: 77244 /77760
- ^{1} French Land Register data, which excludes lakes, ponds, glaciers > 1 km^{2} (0.386 sq mi or 247 acres) and river estuaries.

Larchant (French pronunciation: [laʁʃɑ̃]) is a commune in the Seine-et-Marne department in the Île-de-France region. It is located on the southern edge of the Forest of Fontainebleau.

== Demographics ==
The inhabitants are called Liricantois from the Latin name of the town, Liricantus.

The 1793 census showed a population of 470 people and the maximum population was 730 in 1841. The national statistical authority put the 2020 population at 697 people. The same source shows that 69% of the dwellings were occupied by full time residents, while 20% were second homes and 11% were vacant.

== History ==
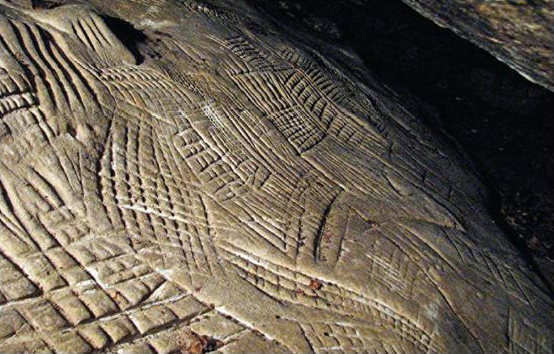
Lattice-like cave etchings from Seine-et-Marne, of the type found in Larchant

Prehistory. In the immediate vicinity of Larchant, around 100 caves contain extensive displays of prehistoric, mostly geometric etchings (e.g. lattices). Of particular note is the vast 'Painted Cave' (la grotte de la peinture). Still visible on its ceiling are traces of an ochre-colored cave painting. Also visible are numerous etchings that have been reliably dated to the Mesolithic period.

The Gallic period. During the Gallic period, Larchant was a spiritual sanctuary dedicated to the cult of water. The destruction and abandonment of the sanctuary is thought to have taken place sometime between AD 350 and 378.

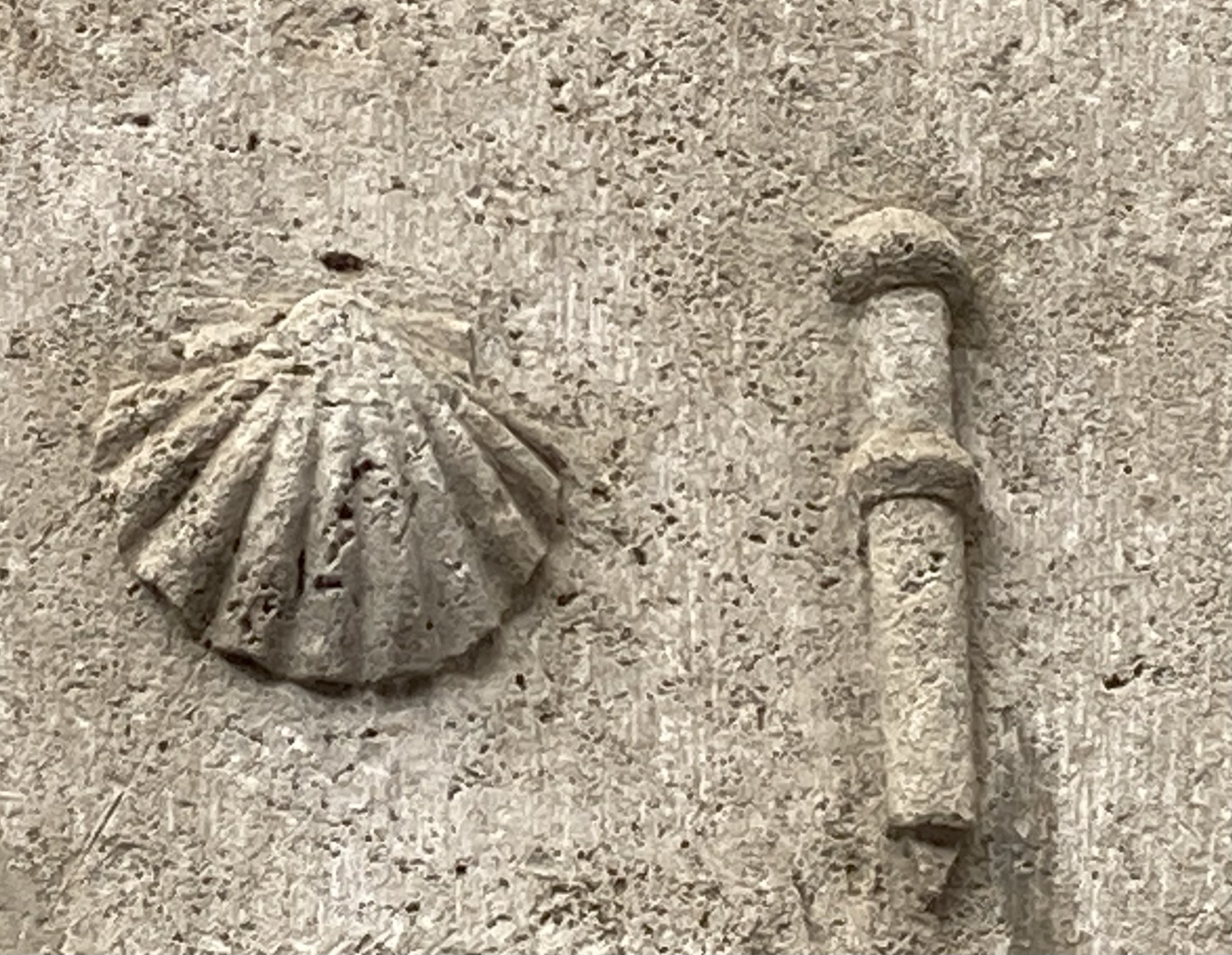
A scallop shell and pilgrim's staff on the Pilgrims’ Lodge in Larchant

The Middle Ages. The Middle Ages witnessed the development of Larchant as an important pilgrimage destination. It served as the center of the cult of Saint Mathurin and attracted, in particular, pilgrims seeking cures for madness or exorcism for the possessed. Pilgrims heading for Santiago de Compostela also often stopped at Larchant. Starting in 1324, the pilgrimage was flourishing to such an extent that it generated funds that were used to finance the operation of Notre Dame de Paris (which had received Larchant as donation from Elisabeth Le Riche in the early 11th century). The growing influx of pilgrims required the construction of the larger church which still dominates the village. With the French Revolution, the pilgrimage largely disappeared, though remnants exist to this day.

== The built environment ==
Larchant's rich spiritual and religious history has left it with an impressive architectural heritage. Key features include:

The basilica of Saint Mathurin. Not technically a basilica, this partly ruined church was built in several stages between the 12th and the 16th century. The structure has suffered numerous vicissitudes over the ages, including pillage and arson during the War of Religions, and several natural disasters. In 1675, the northeast pillar of the high tower collapsed into the nave. In 1846, the church was designated as a monument historique by the French Ministry of Culture.

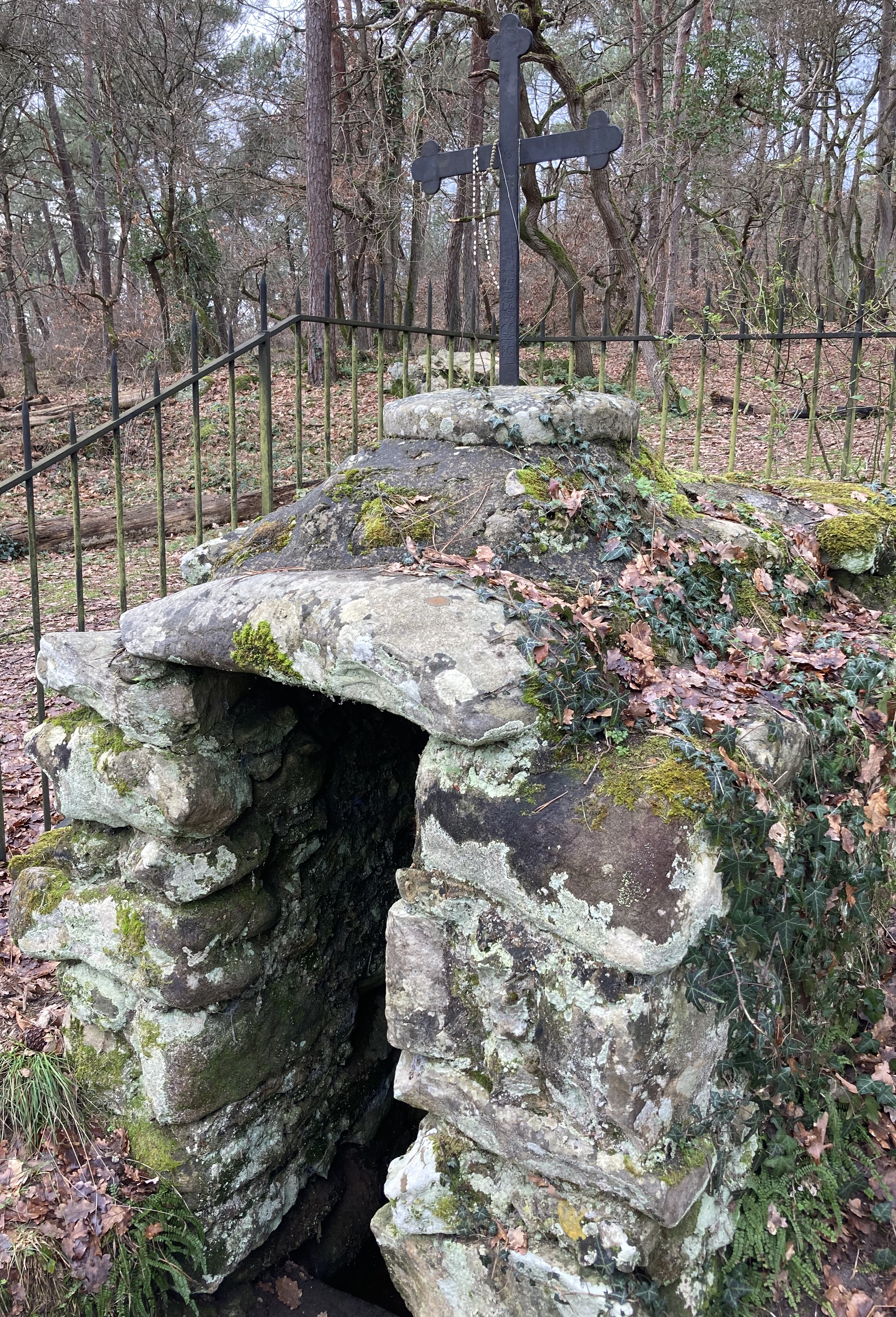
Saint Mathurin's source

The ferme du Chapitre. Overlooking Larchant, this medieval agricultural complex features a tithing barn, dovecote and well. It was the base from which the canons of the 'chapitre' of Notre Dame de Paris looked after their economic interests in Larchant, after receiving the village as a donation in the 11th century. This arrangement ended with the French Revolution.

Saint Mathurin's source (Fontaine Saint Mathurin). A site thought to be linked to the ancient cult of water and to the origins of the village of Larchant and also closely linked to the veneration of Saint Mathurin. According to tradition, Mathurin was a shepherd and, in order to provide water for his flock, he brought forth a spring by kicking a rock which still bears the imprint of his foot.

The Inn of the Three Kings (L'auberge des Trois Rois). This structure has a 15th-century facade and is the best conserved of what was, at the time of the pilgrimages to the tomb of Saint Mathurin, one of many inns available to pilgrims.

The ‘Calvary of the Three Crosses’ (Le Calvaire des trois croix). Dated to at least the 12 century (and possibly much earlier), the base of the Calvaire takes the form of an octagonal pyramid with 8 faces and 7 levels. At the top of the structure are four relatively easily identifiable heads of a toad, a hare, a turtle and a sheep. Originally, the base supported 4 columns. The Calvary is located on the outskirts of the village, just off the road to the Dame Jouanne

== The natural environment ==
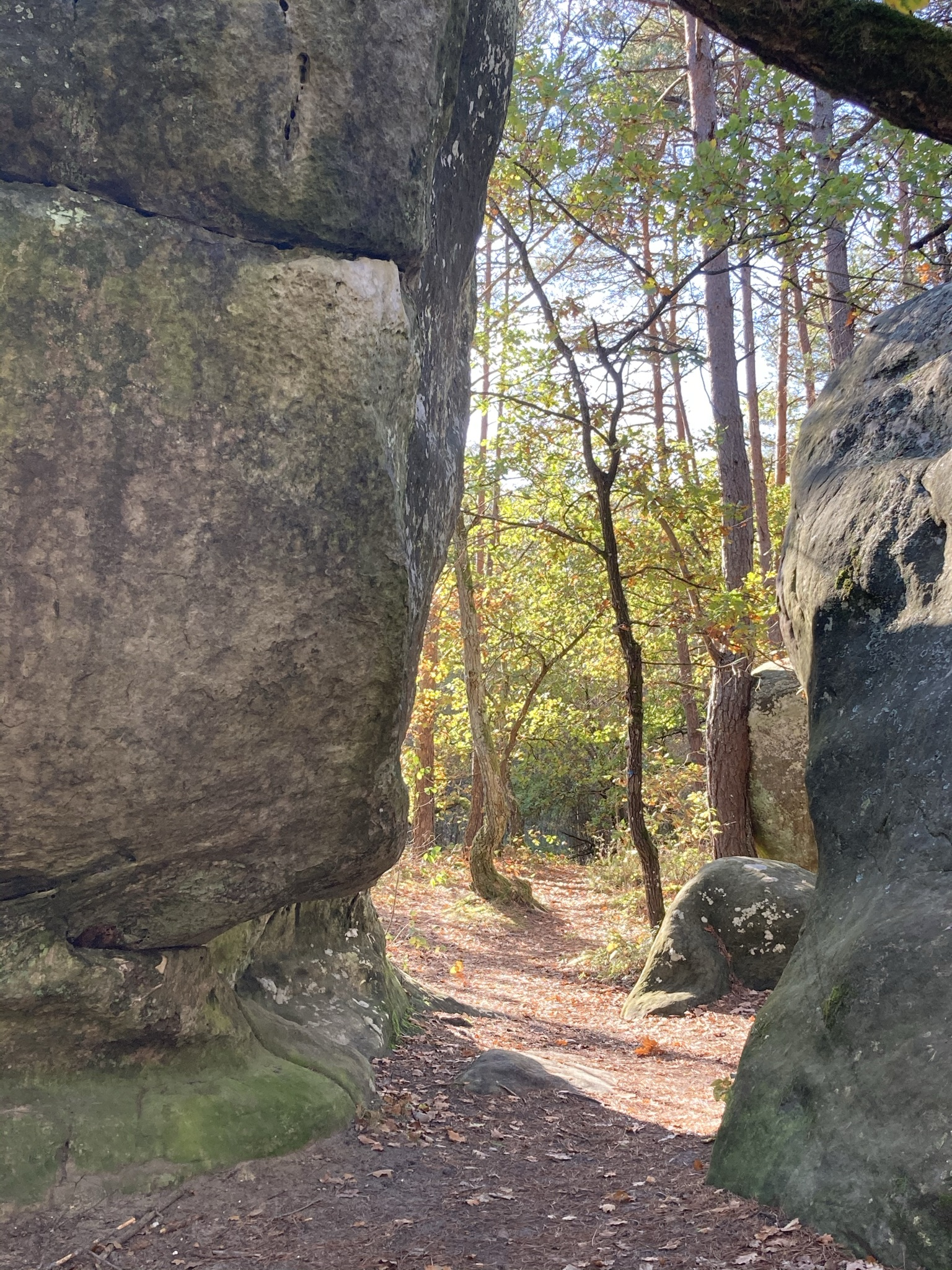
Rock formation in the Forest of the Commanderie

Larchant benefits from a rich natural heritage, including biologically significant wetlands and the Fontainebleau forest.

The Larchant Wetlands Nature Preserve (la Réserve Naturelle Régionale du Marais de Larchant) covers about 124 hectares (306 acres) and supports an exceptional level of biodiversity — 480 plant species and 145 species of beetle have been identified in the reserve. The reserve also offers one of the most important bird sanctuaries in the Île de France region.

The Forest of Fontainebleau (and specifically the area referred to as the Forest of the Commanderie, a reference to an ancient Templar site) almost completely surrounds Larchant. It is a mixed deciduous forest and has a total area of 250 square kilometres (97 square miles). Particularly in the area around Larchant, the forest is known for its very pure and fine sand and for its striking, zoomorphic boulders in sandstone (grès de Fontainebleau).

== Cultural references and other features ==
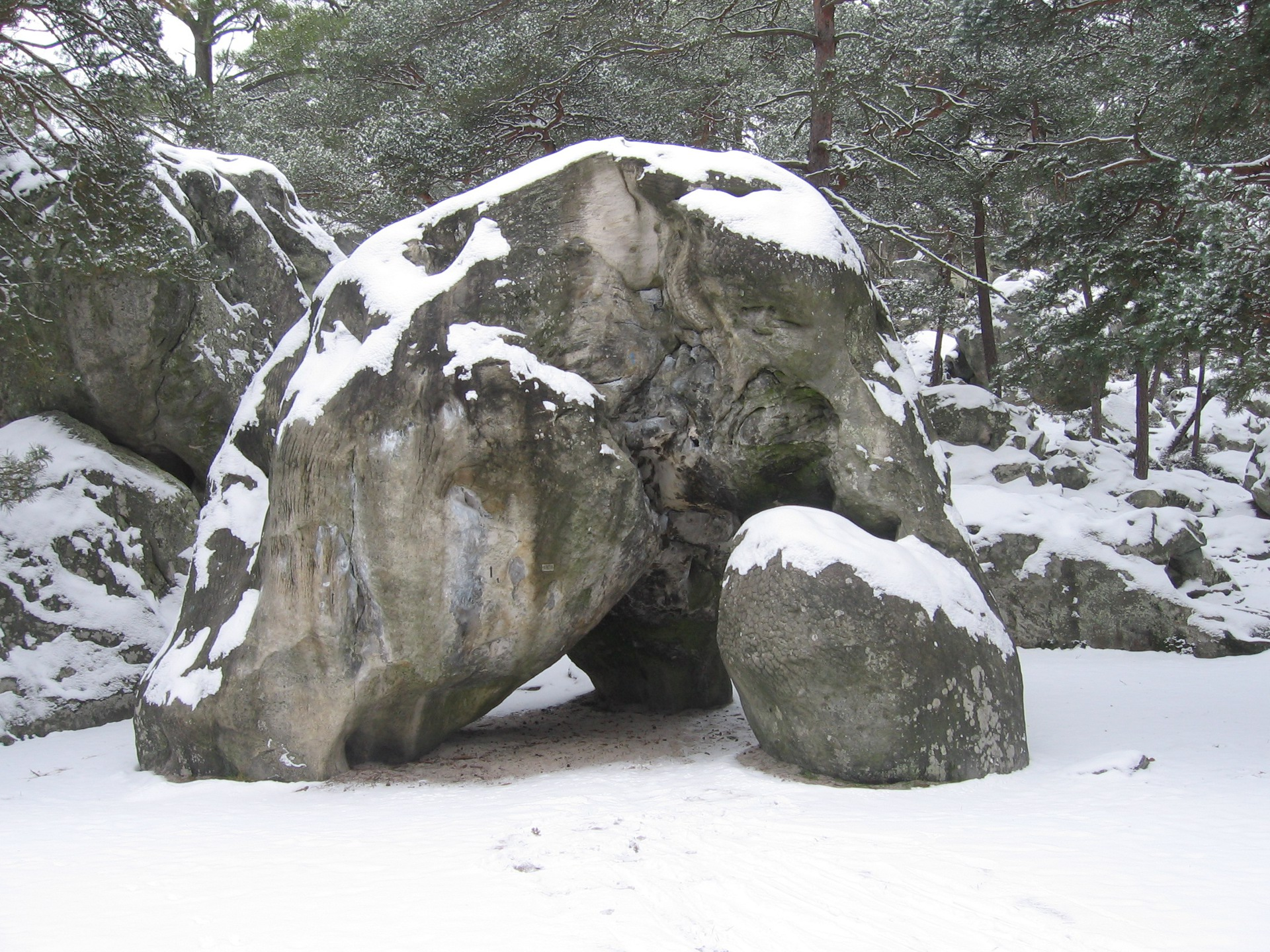
The Elephant Rock

A landscape oil painting by Balthus dating from 1939 is a panoramic view of the village centered on the basilica.

In her 1980 novel The Boy Who Followed Ripley, Patricia Highsmith described the town as a "quiet village" where "[t]he little private houses, all close together in cobble-stoned lanes, looked like illustrations from children's books, cottages almost too small for man and wife to live in".

Larchant is renowned for its first-class boulder climbing sites, l'Éléphant and la Dame Jouanne, in the Forêt de la Commanderie that surrounds it.

== Gallery ==
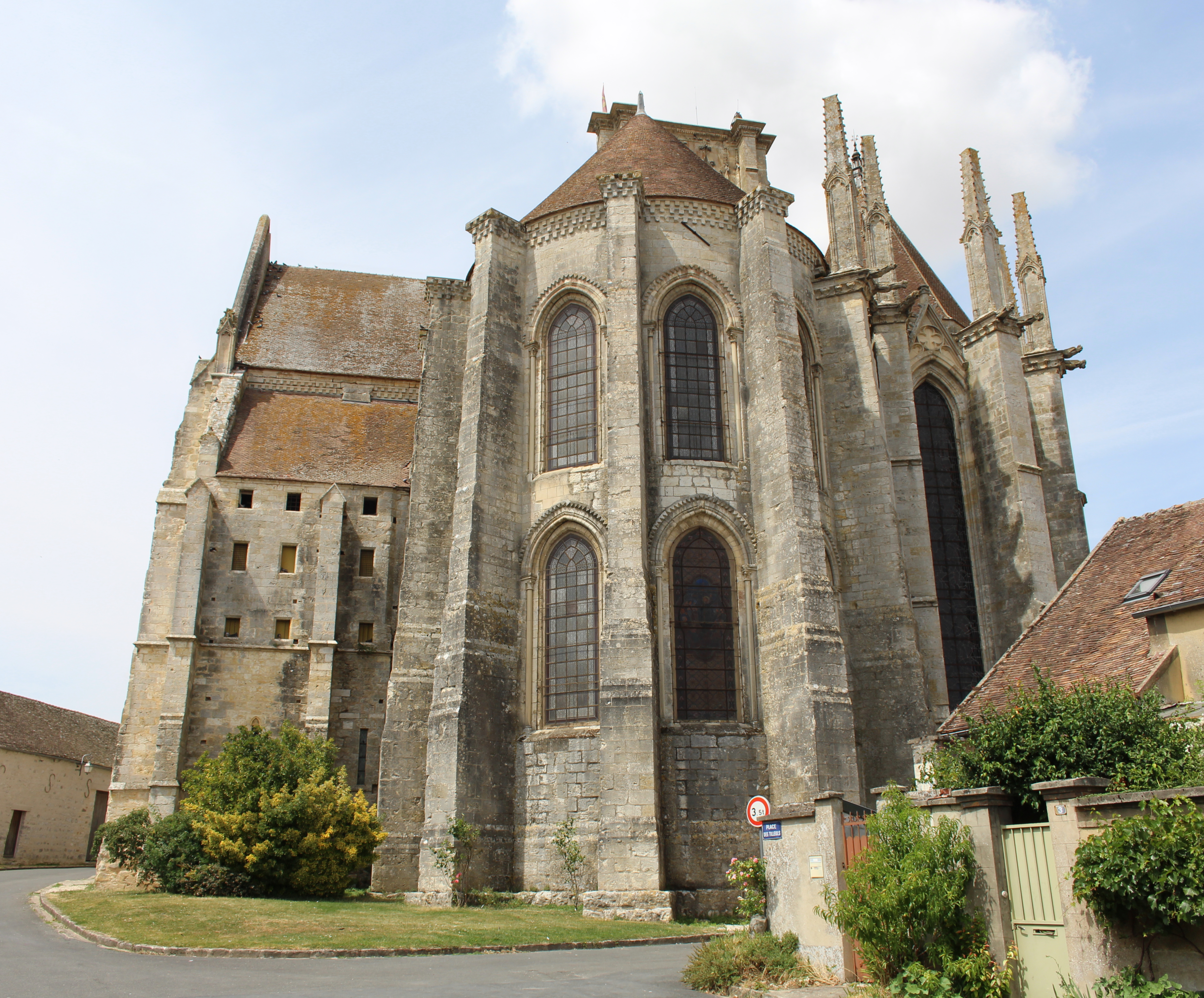
The apse of the Basilica

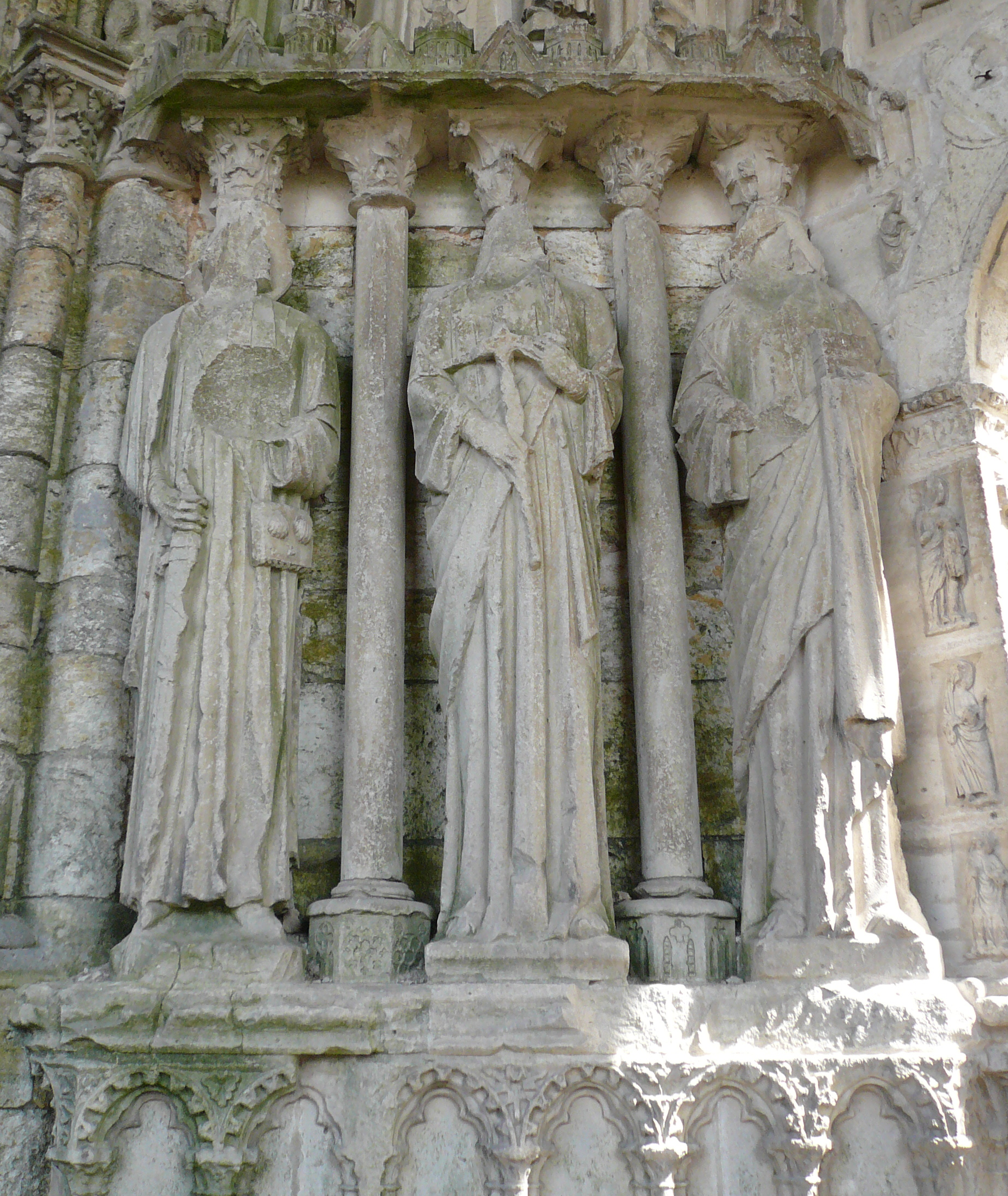
Detail of North portal of the Basilica

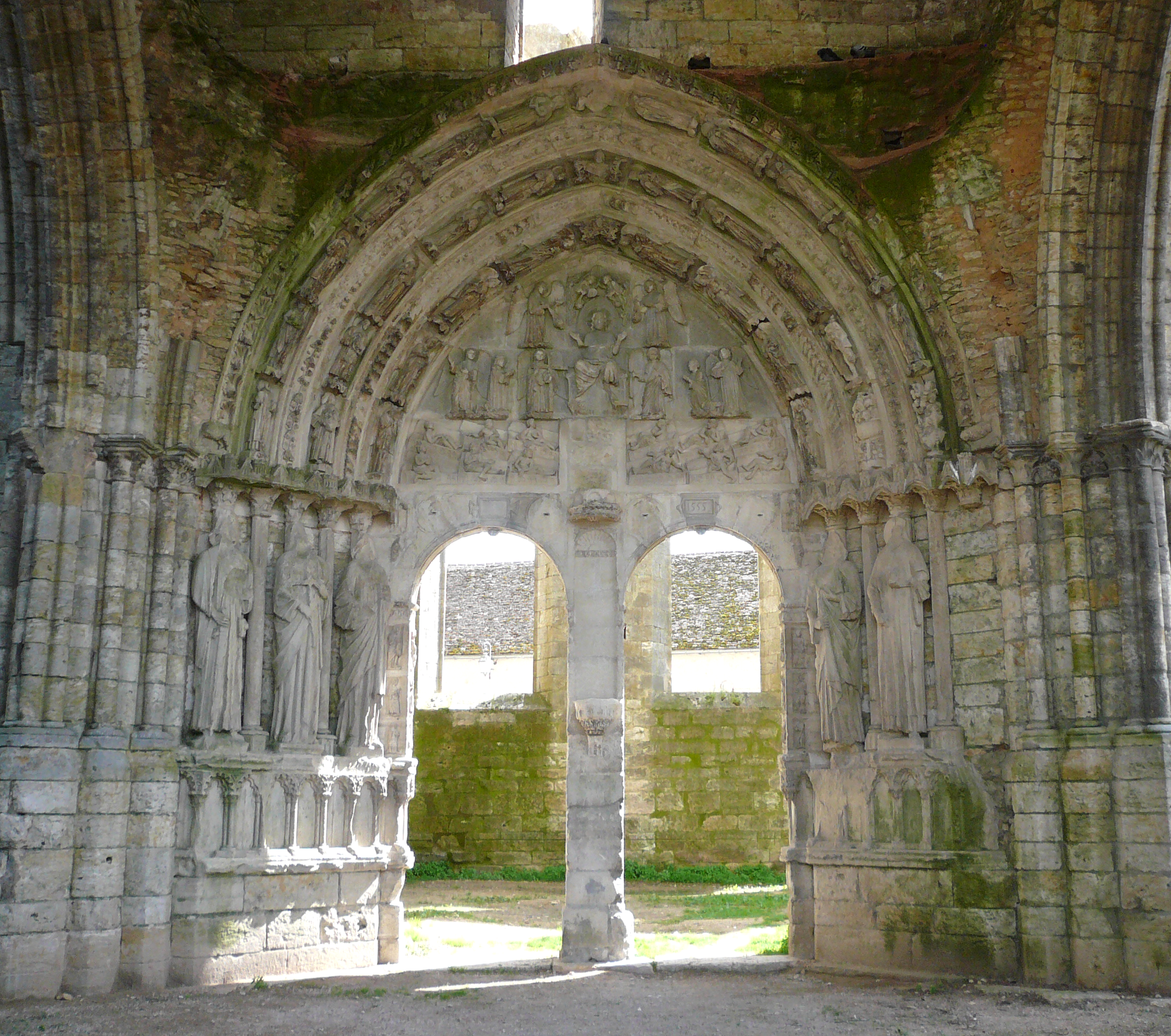
North portal of the Basilica, with tympanum illustrating the Last Judgment.

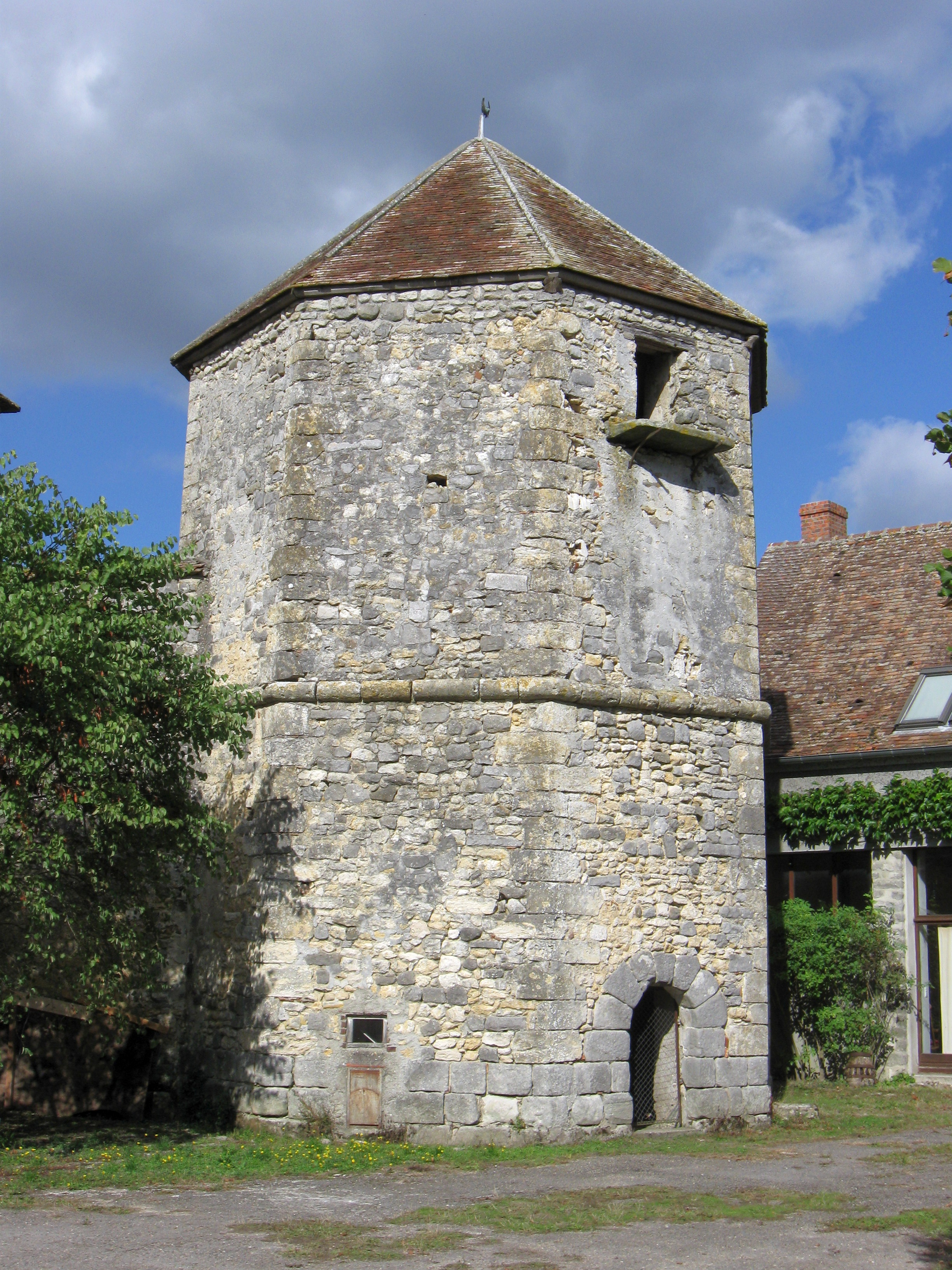
The dovecote of the Farm of the Chapitre

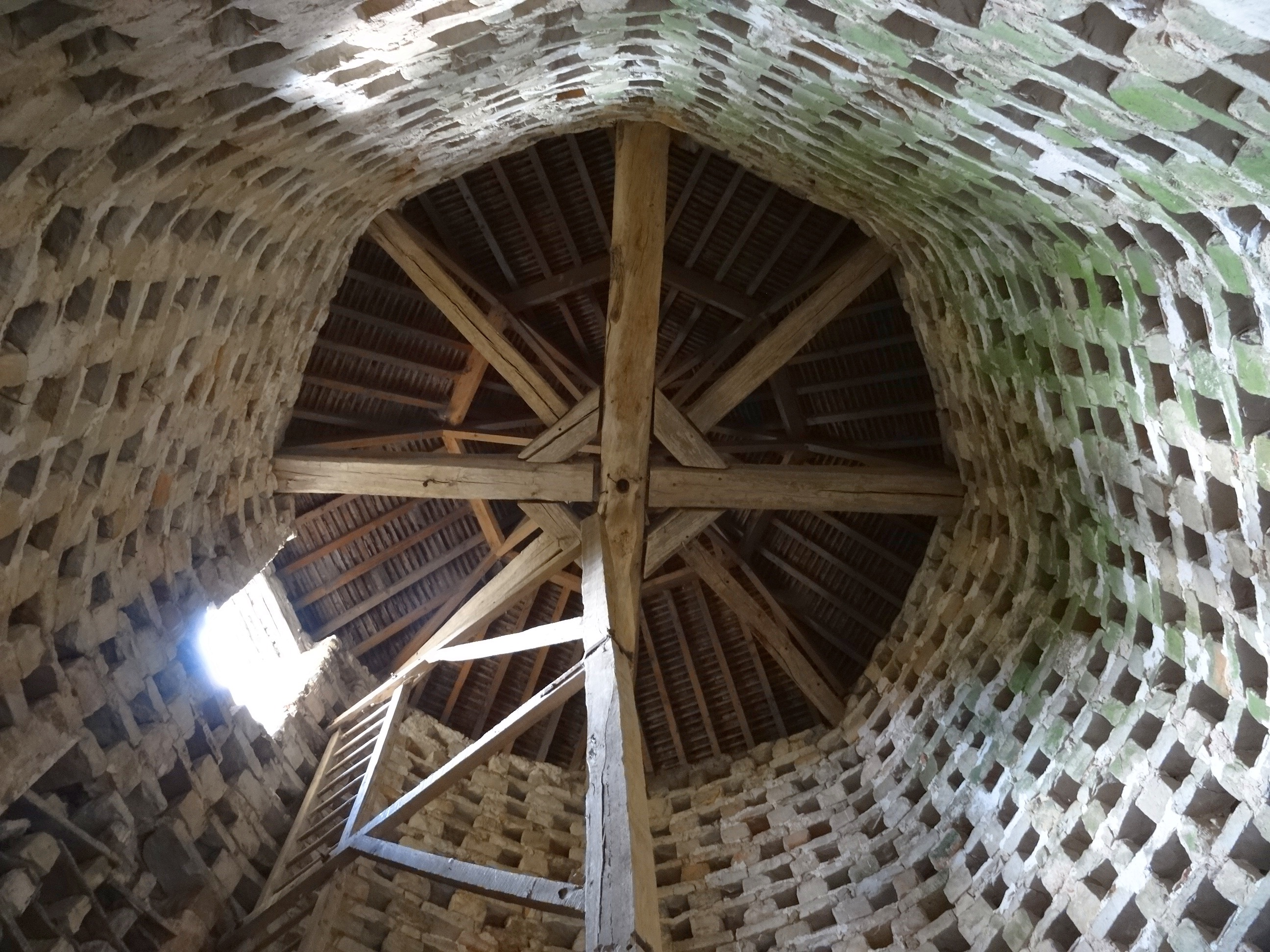
The interior of the dovecote

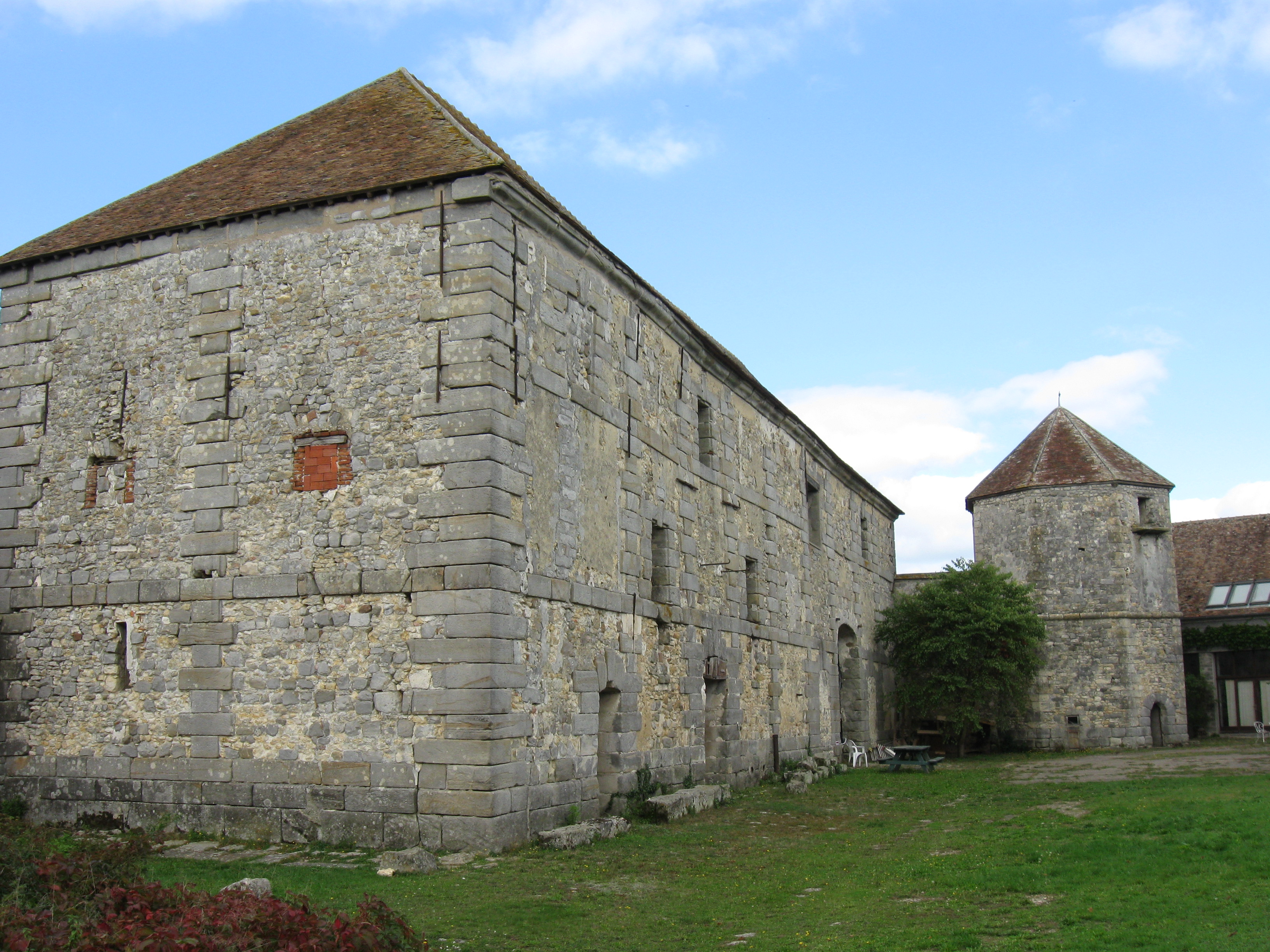
Broader view of the Farm of the Chapitre

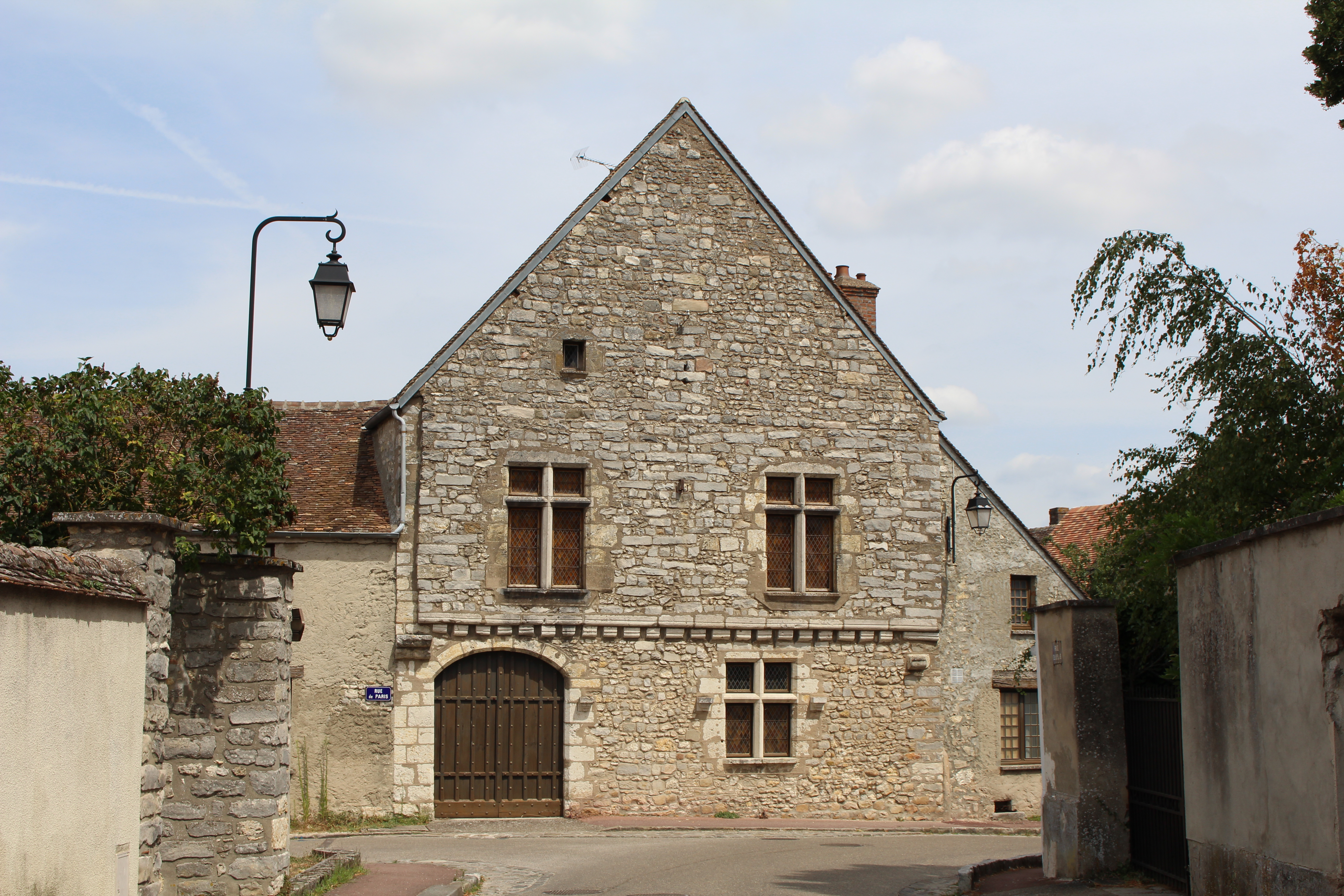
Inn of the 3 Kings

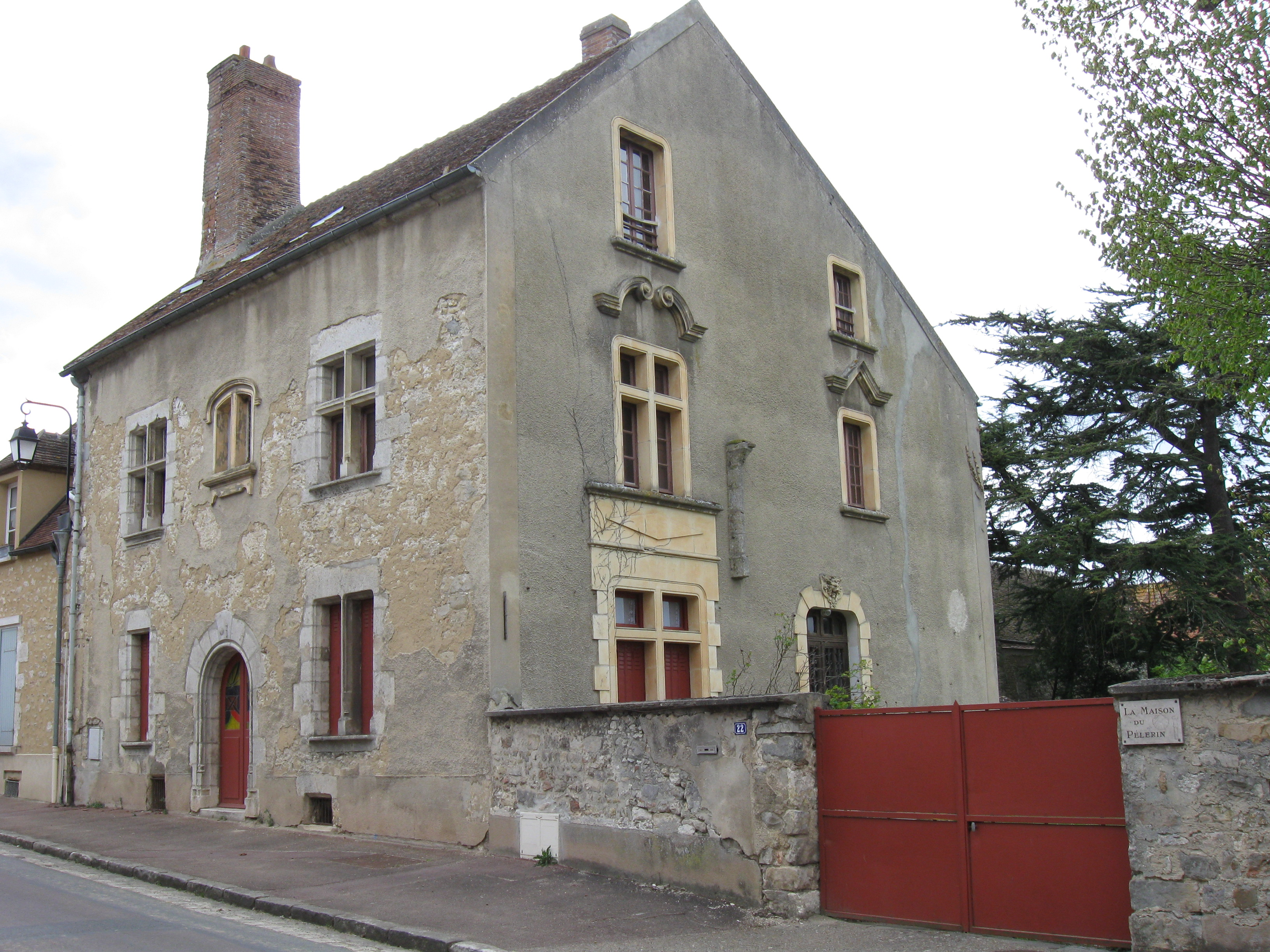
The Pilgrim's Lodge

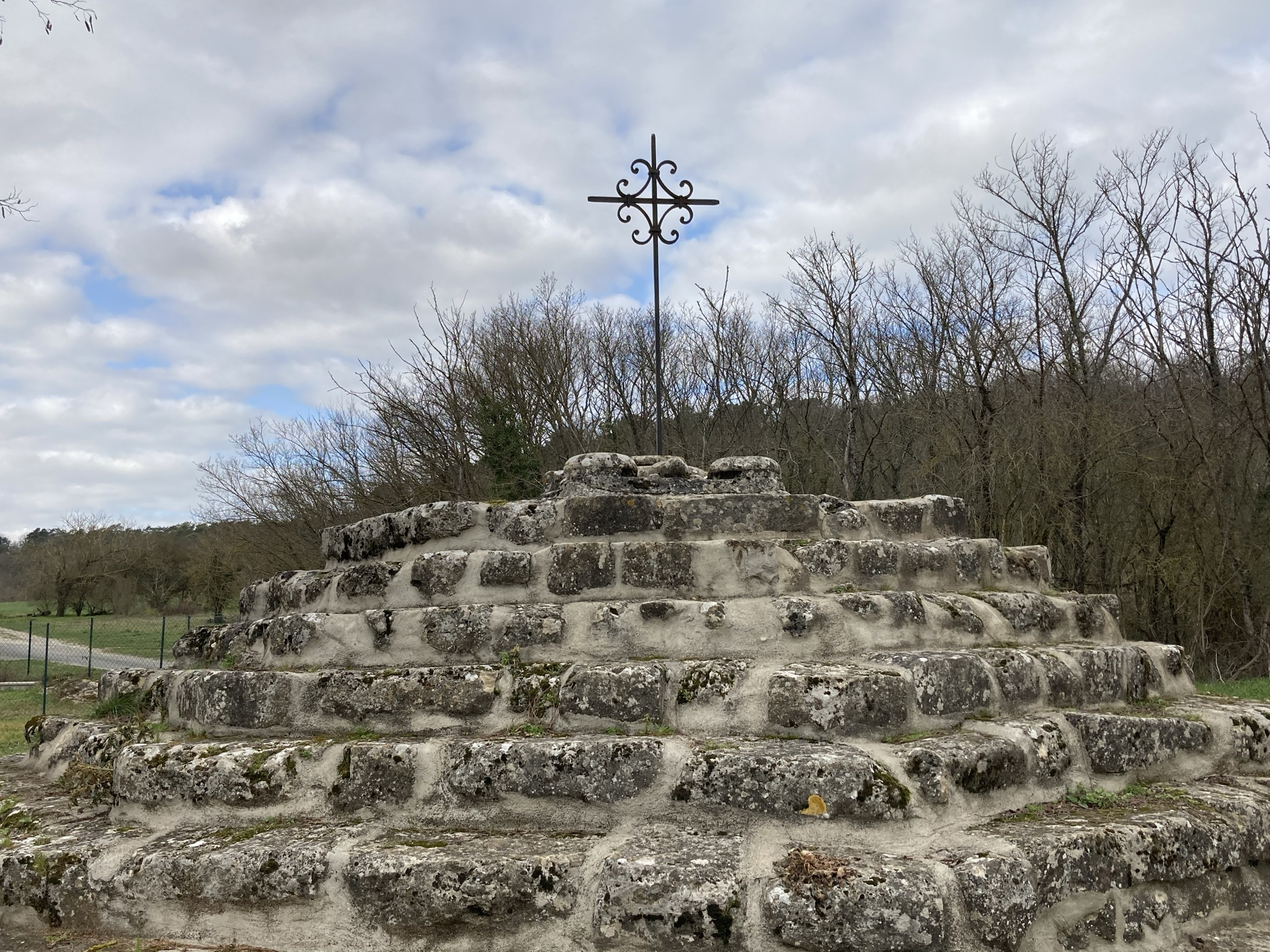
The Calvary of the Three Crosses. Le Calvaire des trois croix.

== See also ==
- Communes of the Seine-et-Marne department
- Fontainebleau rock climbing
- Basilica of Saint Mathurin
- Prehistoric rock engravings of the Fontainebleau Forest
