= Gorges d'Apremont =

Bouldering area, France

Coordinates: 48°26′N 2°38′E

Les Gorges d'Apremont are located several kilometers from Fontainebleau. Les Gorges d'Apremont is a bouldering (i.e. rock climbing) area with several hundred boulders of all difficulty levels (Font Scale F4-F8a).

== See also ==
- Fontainebleau rock climbing
