= Cuvier Rempart =

Bouldering area in France

Cuvier Rempart is a bouldering area in the Fontainebleau forest, where its first 8a named C'etait Demain is located.

== See also ==
- Fontainebleau rock climbing
