= Lisiard Le Riche =

French lord

Lisiard Le Riche (b. circa 900, d. after 941) was the Lord of Sceaux and a knight serving Hugh the Great, the Duke of Burgundy.

Lisiard Le Riche was born sometime around the year 900 to father Teudon Le Riche, Viscount of Paris. Le Riche had three children, all of whom went on to serve in positions of privilege and prestige amongst the nobility and ruling class of 10th-century France. Lisiard's son Ansoud I, viscount of Auxerre, married the concubine of Hugh the Great, Raingarde de Dijon, and became guardian of their son, Héribert Robertien, the future bishop of Auxerre. Lisiard's other son, Joseph Le Riche, served as the Archbishop of Tours from approximately 952 to 960, and Lisiar's daughter Elizabeth married Aymon, count of Corbeil, forming the long line of the counts of Corbeil.

In 941, Lisiard made a pilgrimage to Fleury Abbey, which was a rite of passage for French noblemen of the time, and one that would potentially offer Lisiard both increased political power and higher status. During this pilgrimage, Lisiard took the habit (wearing the robes of monks), studied from the extensive library of religious texts that had been assembled there, and made a written pledge of lands that would later pass to the monastery of Saint-Benoît-sur-Loire. This written proclamation was signed by a long list of contemporary dignitaries, including Hugh the Great, Duke of Burgundy, Bernard II, Count of Senlis, Theobald I, Count of Blois, Fulk I, Count of Anjou, Ralph II, Count of Valois, Aymon, Count of Corbeil, and Fromond I, Count of Sens.
