= Cuvier (name) =

Cuvier is both a French surname and a given name. Notable people with the name include:

Surname:

- Frédéric Cuvier (1773–1838), French zoologist and paleontologist
- Georges Cuvier (1769–1832), French paleontologist
- Sébastien Cuvier (born 1970), French footballer

Given name:

- Cuvier Grover (1828–1885), U.S. Union Army officer during the American Civil War
