= Bas-Cuvier =

Coordinates: 48°26′50″N 2°38′25″E

Le Bas-Cuvier is one of the most famous and accessible bouldering areas in Fontainebleau, known for its historic problems and proximity to Fontainebleau town. The problems range from easy to extremely difficult.

Famous problems include La Marie Rose, opened in 1946 by René Ferlet and described as the first 6a in Fontainebleau. Another historic problem at Bas-Cuvier is L'Abattoir, opened by Michel Libert and described by the Groupe de Haute Montagne as the first grade-7 problem in the forest.

== See also ==
Fontainebleau rock climbing
