= Curbar Edge =

Rock outcrop, Derbyshire

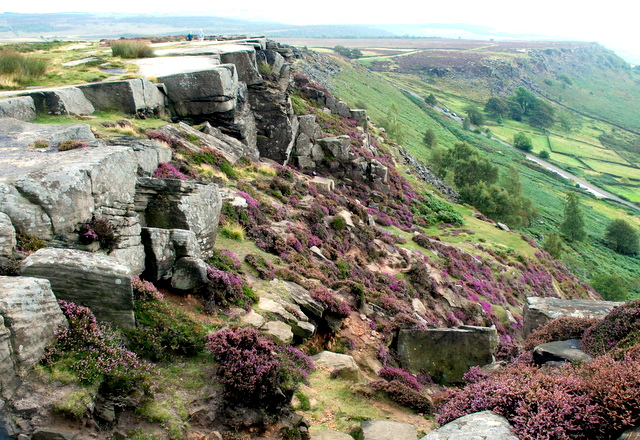
- Along Curbar Edge

Highest point
- Elevation: 292 m (958 ft)
- Coordinates: 53°16′22″N 01°36′54″W

Naming
- Etymology: "Curbar" means "Corda's fortified place"

Geography
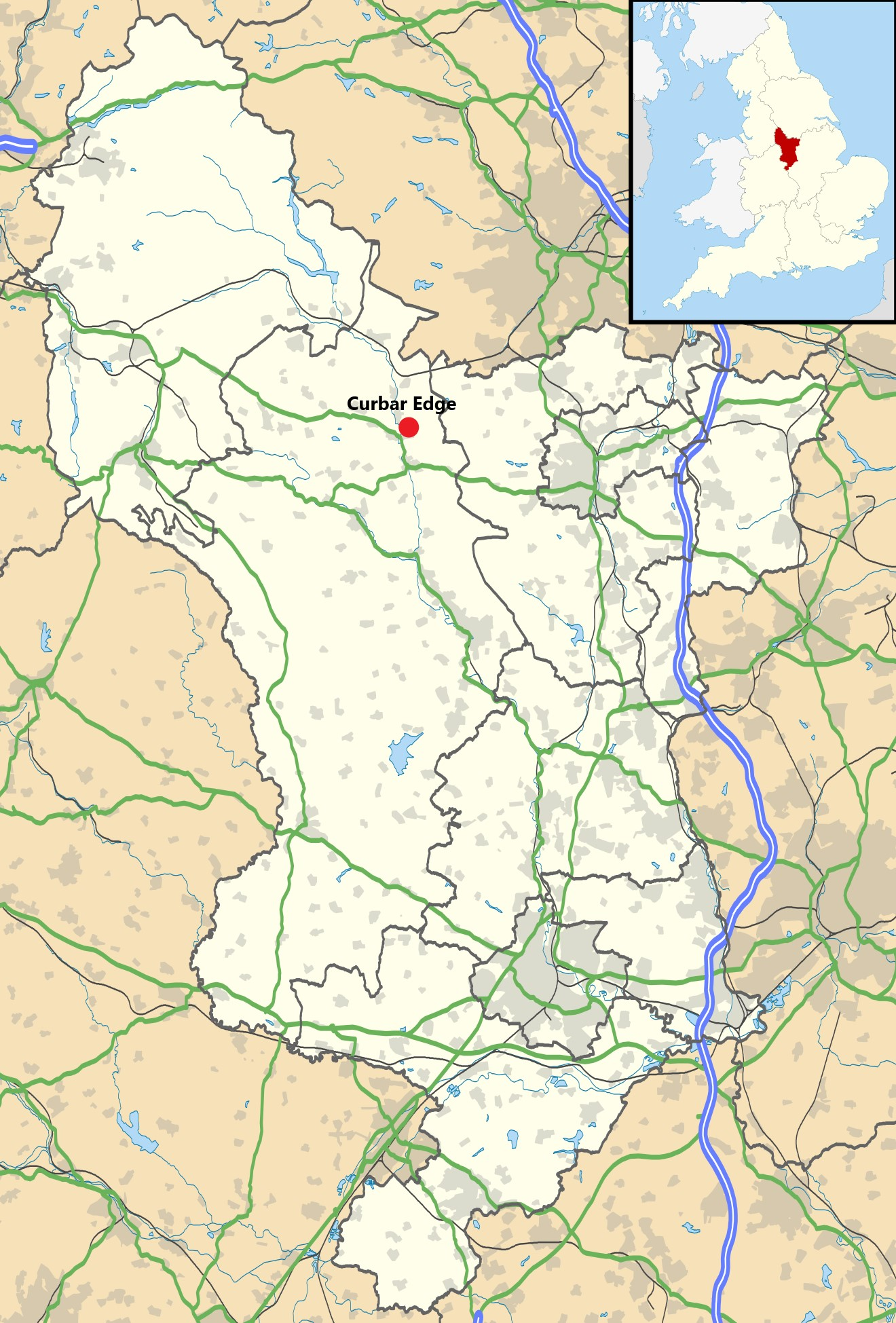
- Location in Derbyshire
- Location: Derbyshire
- Country: England
- Parent range: Peak District

Geology
- Rock type(s): Gritstone, Sandstone

Climbing
- First ascent: early 1900s
- Easiest route: Beech Gully

Curbar Edge is a gritstone moorland escarpment above the village of Curbar, in Derbyshire, England and close to the villages of Baslow, Calver, and Froggatt. It is located within the Peak District National Park at an altitude of 958 ft (292 m). It is regarded as a significant location for rock climbing, both regionally and nationally, in terms of both the historical development of the sport and as the location of first ascents.

== Geography ==
=== Location ===
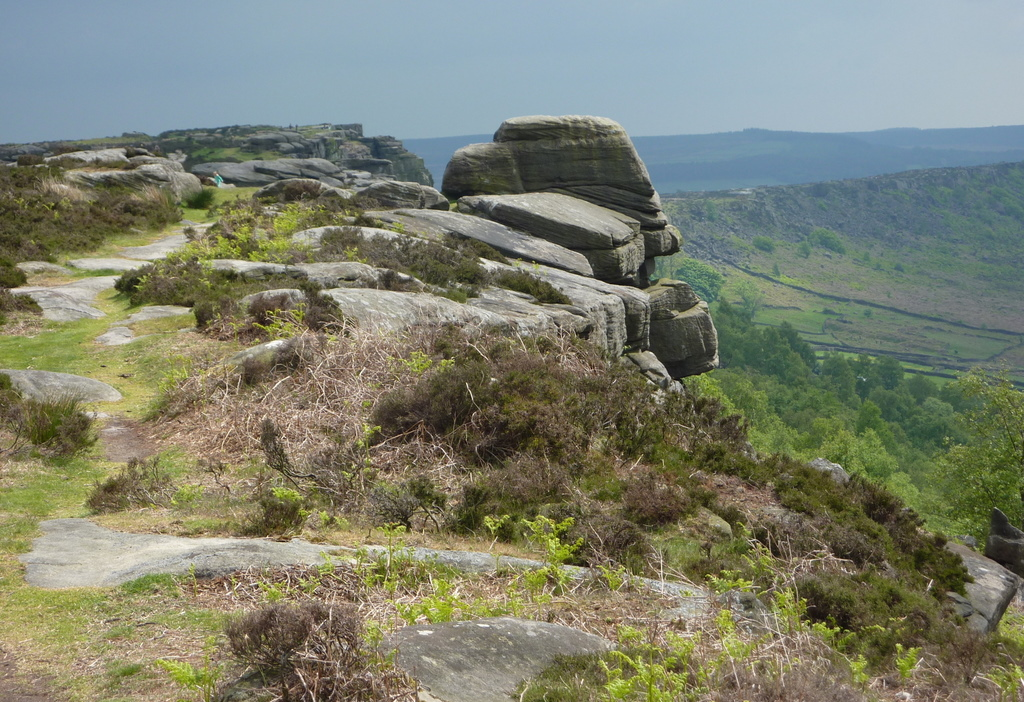
View of Curbar Edge.

Curbar Edge is located in the Dark Peak, the area of the Peak District characterized by peat moorland and gritstone rock. The Edge is one of a long series of west-facing gritstone escarpments, collectively known as the Eastern Grit. A short walk away from Curbar Edge is White Edge, which is visible east of the location. The ground is uneven because of the presence of the Big Moor. In the same area of Curbar Edge is located Padley Gorge, on the A6187, close to Grindleford village, this area is recognised as a Site of Special Scientific Interest (SSSI). Another place of interest located near Curbar Edge is Linacre Reservoirs, built between 1855 and 1904, located in Chesterfield, Derbyshire.

Curbar Edge is situated between Sheffield and Manchester. Curbar Edge is located in the same area of smaller settlements as Chesterfield, 8 miles (13 km), Dronfield 8 miles (13 km), Matlock 13 miles (21 km), Staveley 12.4 miles (20.0 km) and Buxton 16 miles (26 km).

The average elevation of the Edge is 849.7 ft (259.0 m), the maximum elevation is 1,276 ft (389 m) and the minimum elevation is 387 ft (118 m).

=== Etymology ===
The name "Curbar" and the several names from which it is derived ("Cordeburg", "Cordesburwe", "Quordborough", "Cordborgh", "Corburg", "Coresburgh" and "Corber") have the same meaning: Corda's fortified place. The personal name "Corda" is uncertain, as there are several plausible origins for this name.

== Flora and fauna ==
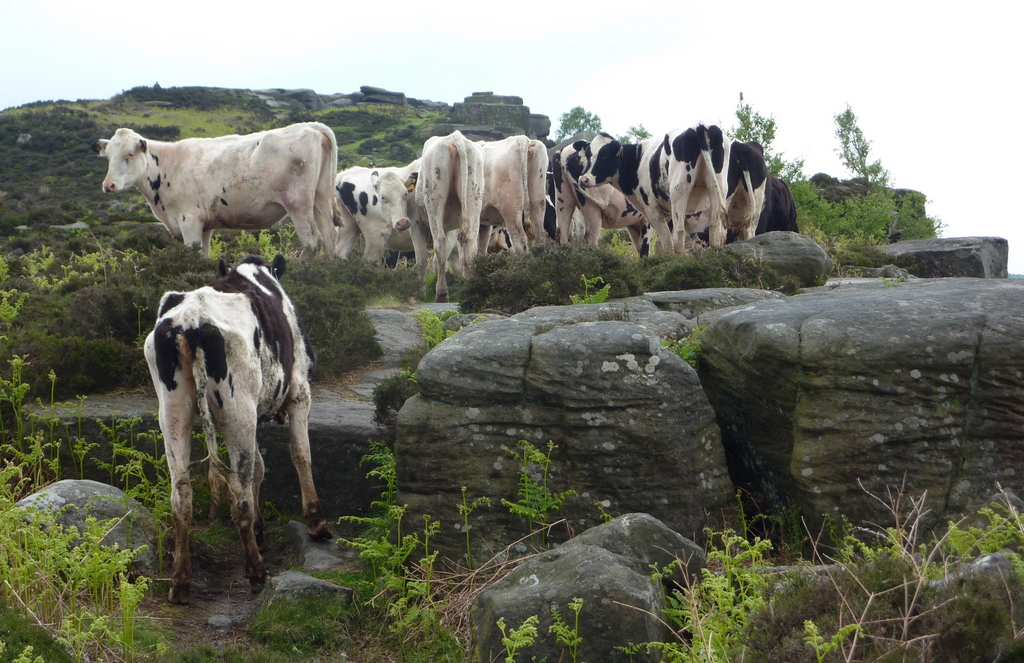
Cattle at Curbar Edge.

Apart from shrubs such as guelder rose and mezereon, primrose, lily of the valley, cowslip and dog's mercury characterize this habitat. A great number of birds such as dippers, robins, blackbirds, herons, pheasants, sparrows and great tit can be found there. Birds of prey, for example, barn owl, buzzard, kestrel, little owl are among the components of the biological food chain. On land other animals such as highland cattle or grouse define this area.

=== Deer rutting season ===
The rutting season for deer is between the middle of September and the middle of November. These months are the most favorable to see the horned animal. The area to watch the deer rut is between Curbar Edge and White Edge. For viewing or photographing deer in the area, it is mandatory to pay attention, and a distance of 196 ft (60 m) is suggested to not interfere with the normal rutting behavior of the animal.

== Geology ==
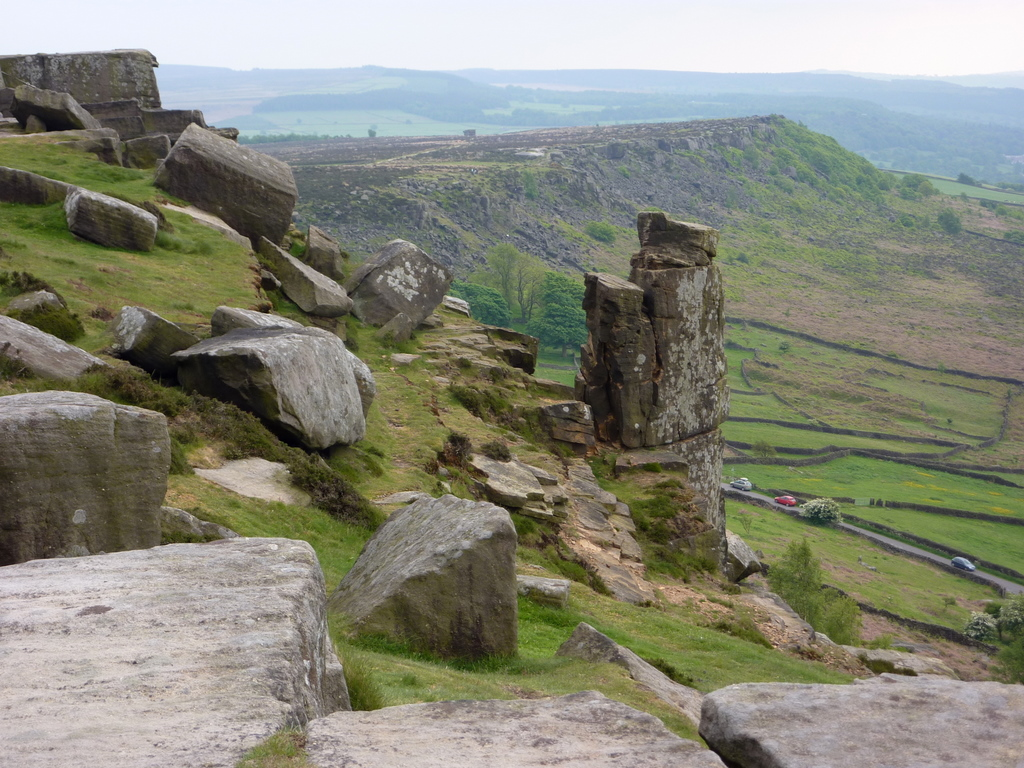
Quarried gritstone pinnacle at Curbar Edge.

Exposures of the Chatsworth Grit and the Crawshaw Sandstone on the basis of the Pennine Lower Coal Measures can be found in Curbar Edge. Curbar Edge has been used as a BGS mapping training location. Curbar Edge is located in Derbyshire which was within the delta of a vast stream that deposited sand and dust across southern Britain. Because of currents and tides, muds deposited in deeper water became shales, and sands became gritstone.

Curbar Edge is made of gritstone, a rough granular rock that consists of small pebbles and angular-shaped grains.

The gritstone, of which the Edge is composed, is strong and affects landscaping. It tends to form the highest soils and consists of variable layers characterized by edges. Characteristic overhangs are formed when erosion undermines the underlying softer layers. The particularly severe wind erosion in the extremely cold and dry conditions that prevailed in Derbyshire, where Curbar Edge is located, during the Last Glacial Period picked out the weaker layers and defined the sculptural features of the Edge.

An active process on the Edge today is the formation of the crenelations in pinnacles of gritstone. These are the deepest vertical flutes near the top of the exposed structure, which descend vertically regardless of the angle of the local layer, but gradually fade after 3.28–6.56 ft (1.00–2.00 m).

== History ==
=== Prehistory ===
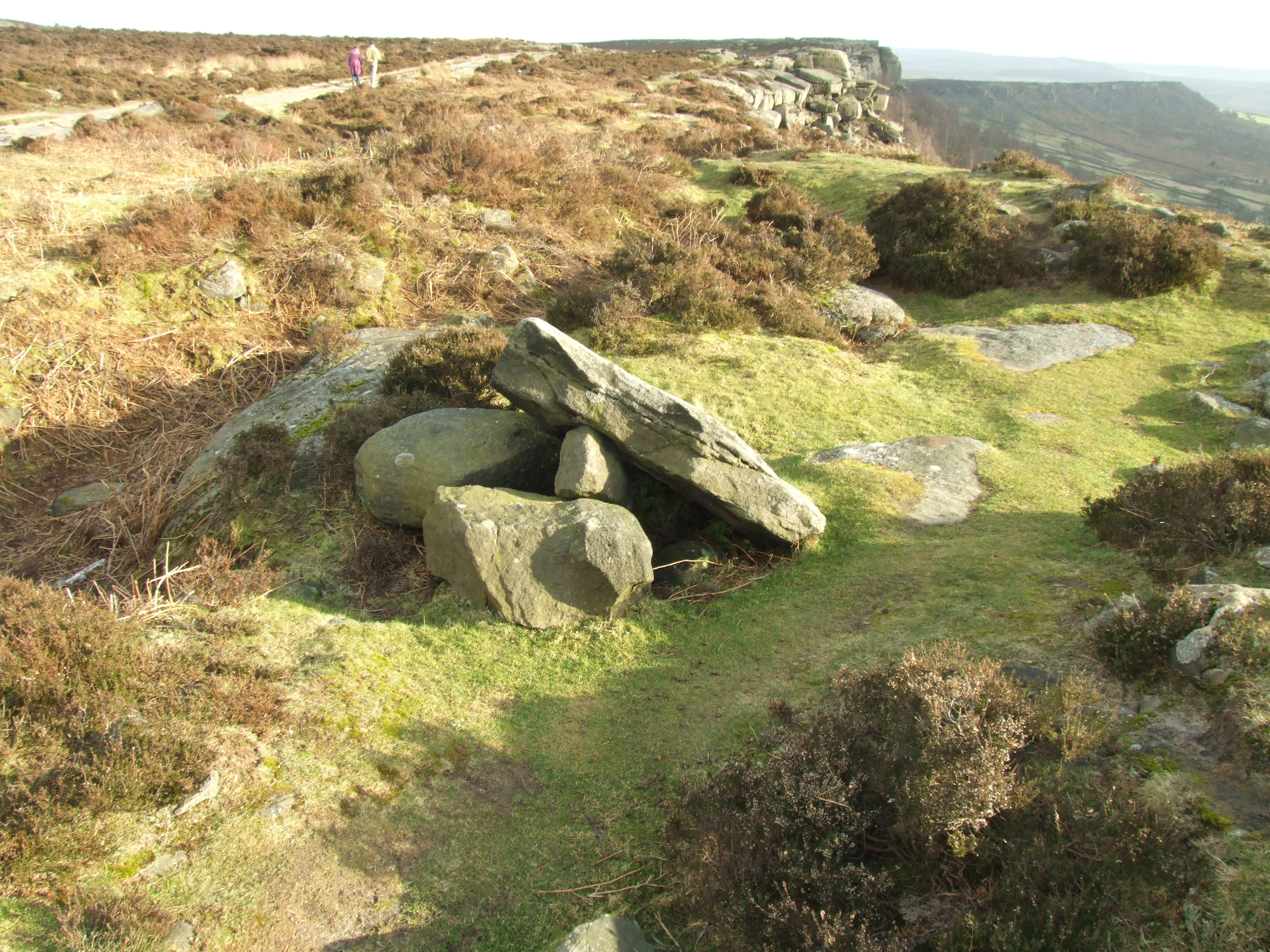
Cist on Curbar Edge.

A range of prehistoric remains is located in the area around Curbar Edge. Ancient cairns exist to the east near Froggatt Edge and to the west in Stoke Flat West. The East Moors in Derbyshire also has one of the largest preserved prehistoric field systems, settlement sites, and ceremonial stone circles. These remains allowed archaeologists to be able to determine an occupation date from the Bronze Age.

On Curbar Edge is a round cairn that is dated to the Bronze Age. This cairn is a prehistoric funeral monument with a single burial placed inside, covered in a gritstone cist. The cairn, measuring 606.9 ft × 49.2 ft (185.0 m × 15.0 m), was enclosed by gritstone blocks and covered with earth. It was discovered in 1913 by John Manners, 9th Duke of Rutland (1886–1940), the then owner of the land, and his gamekeeper, E. Peat. They made a partial excavation, in which process some archaeological information was disturbed, for example, the original height of the monument. The perimeter of the cairn remained undisturbed and archaeologists discovered fragments of a food vessel, a broken bronze knife, and a flint scraper. The cairn is a Scheduled monument, and also significant for its relationship to the adjacent Bronze Age field system.

=== Post Roman ===
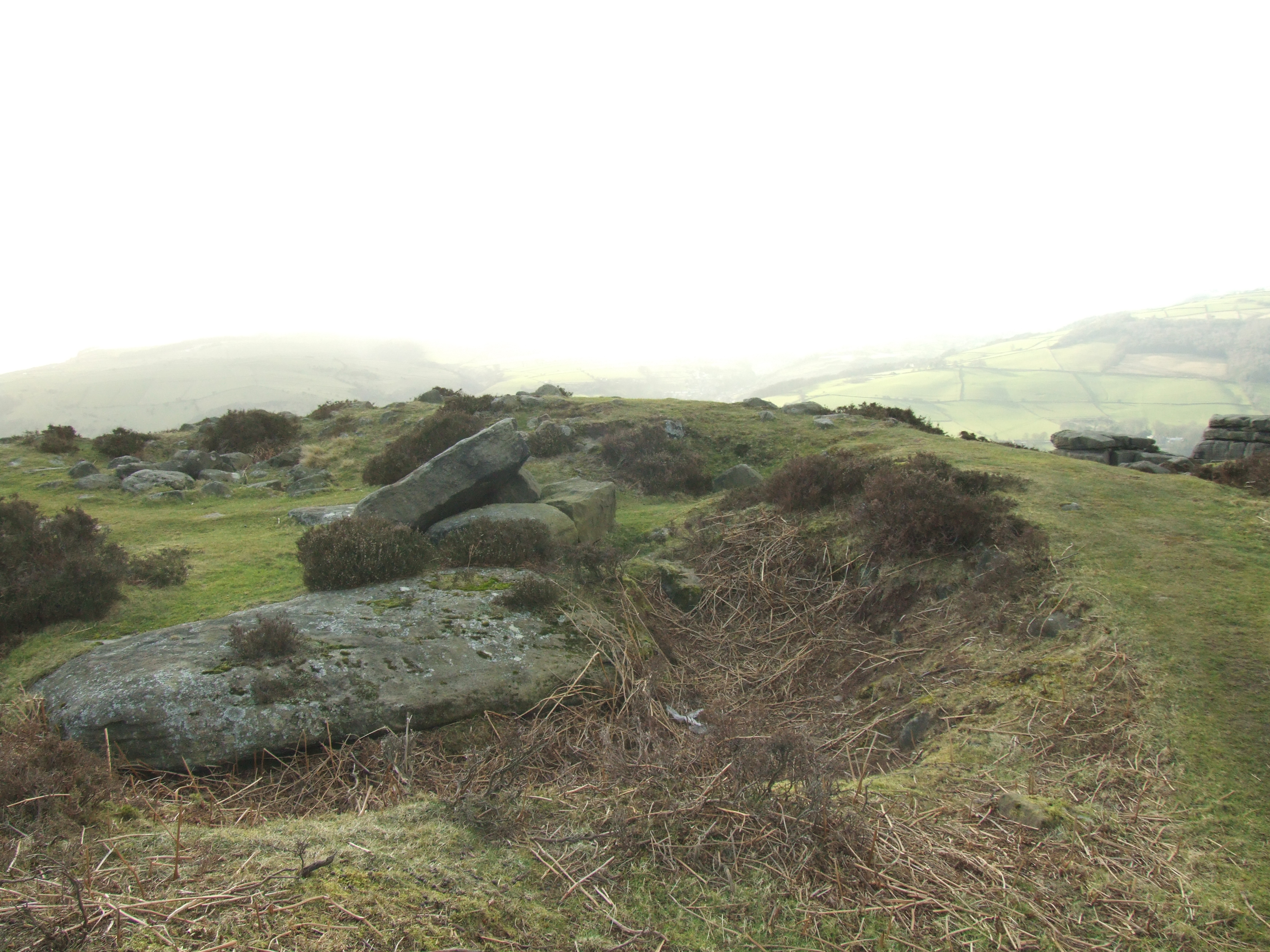
Cairns on Curbar Edge.

The Romans are believed to be the first to exploit the natural gritstone resources of Curbar Edge. Curbar Gap at the southern end of the edge is crossed by a Roman road, providing easy access for quarrying the local stone. The Curbar Edge quarries are one of 4 areas in Derbyshire where millstone was produced. The millstones from Derbyshire were used to produce grey flour which is the reason that they only were used to produce animal feeds. The diameter of the milestone was usually 5.9 ft (1.8 m), and its weight was around 2.4 t (2.6 tons). There are many assumed quarries around Derbyshire and Curbar Edge. Exact quarry locations are often unknown, as marks on the stones indicate that many were moved from the excavation sites and subsequently worked on nearby. A large number of these quarries occur near old routes for the transportation of millstones. The millstone production on Curbar Edge came to an end around the year 1811. Stone extraction from rocks was performed on a small scale and would lead to the manual perforation of the rock, then used to grind grain.

Towards the end of the 11th century, a group of traders began transporting the Cheshire "witches" salt from Northwich, Middlewich and Nantwich to the medieval trading towns of Yorkshire, Derbyshire, and Nottinghamshire. Salt was used not only as a spice but also to preserve food. The Domesday Book illustrates the main routes for transporting salt, such as Salterway, Salter Hill, or Salter Ford. The journeys passing High Peak were too difficult for a man to do, so the salt was carried by packhorses along the paths of the steep hills. One of the viable routes, discovered in 1272, led to Buxton from Fairfield and through Saltersford. At this point, traders heading to Chesterfield had to climb the escarpment across the River Derwent to Curbar Gap to finally enter the market town via Saltergate.

== Rock climbing ==
=== History ===
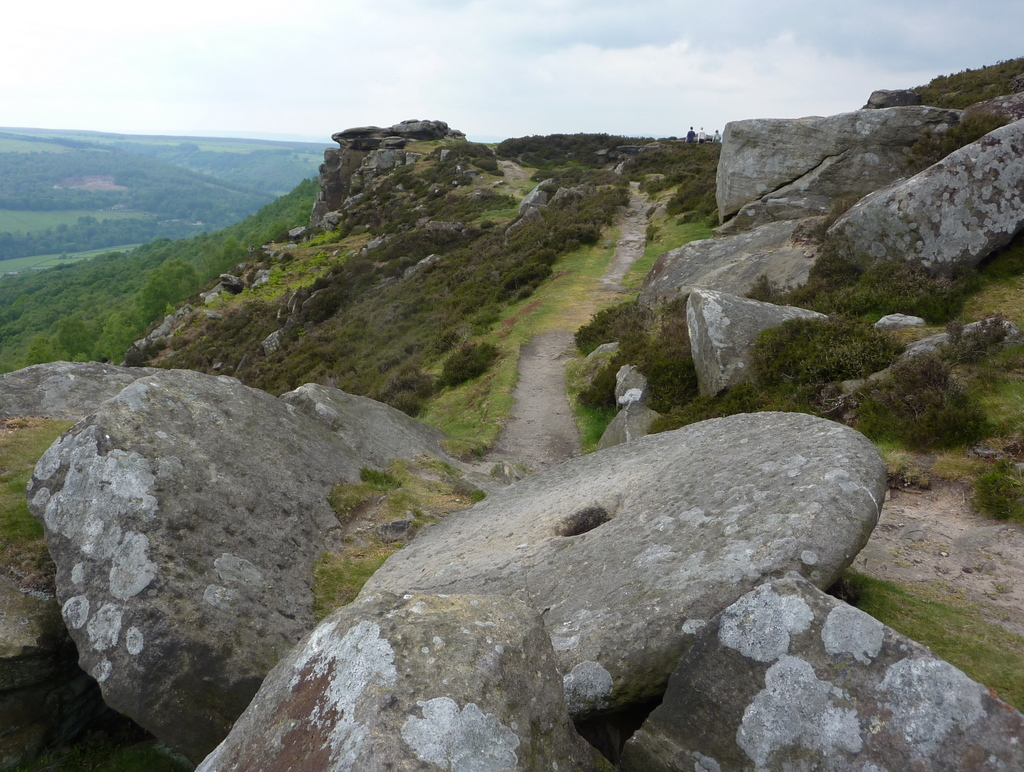
Quarried gritstone grindstone on Curbar Edge.

Some of the earliest known climbing activity was by Peak District pioneer, Jim Puttrell and the Kyndwr Club. They are known to have attempted a very early climb on Curbar in the 1900s, finally ascended by Chapman and Thomsett of the Polaris Mountaineering club in 1948 and now called PMC/1.

The Valkyrie Club, with Joe Brown and Slim Sorrell, first visited in early 1948, resulting in the first ascents of routes including The Brain, and Bel Ami. Subsequent visits in the 1950s by this group led to their first ascents of the three cracks of Left Eliminate (originally known as 'the little crack on the left'), the Peapod, and Right Eliminate (originally known as 'the Great Crack'). In 1975 Curbar Edge appeared in the first photographic guide for rock climbers in the Peak District.

In the 1980s and 1990s, many notable climbers achieved significant first ascents at Curbar, including Ron Fawcett (with Amnesia Arete); Johnny Dawes (with The End of the Affair, Slab and Crack, White Lines and Janus); Gary Gibson; John Allen (with Profit of Doom and Moon Crack); and, Mick Fowler (with Linden, considered Britain's first E6-graded climb). In 2001 John Arran made the first ascent of the route Dr. Dolittle, graded E10 7a and still one of the hardest routes in Britain.

=== Routes ===
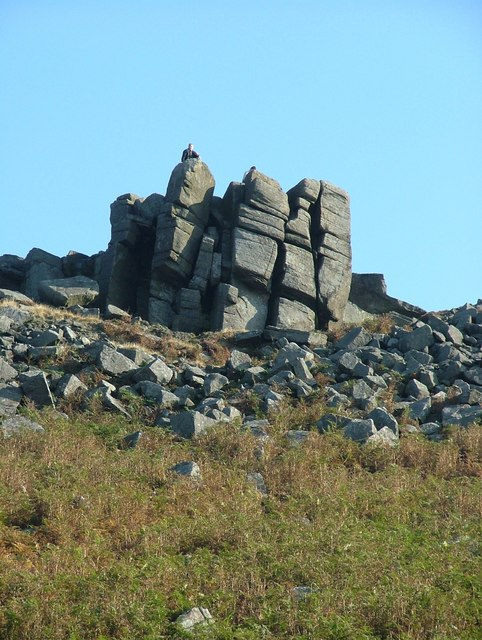
Boulders at Curbar Edge.

Curbar Edge is a major location for Rock climbing in the Peak District for the practice of both traditional rock climbing and bouldering. There are no sport climbing routes on the edge, because of local ethics and policies defined by bodies such as the British Mountaineering Council and the Peak District National Park. By 1999 there were over 150 different named rock climbing routes on Curbar Edge, in addition to a wide range of bouldering problem routes on the edge and adjacent boulders. The length of the routes range from 20 to 79 ft (6.1 to 24.1 m). The difficulty of routes range in traditional UK Grade (climbing) from Easy (E) to Extreme (E1 - E10), and include routes with some of the hardest technical traditional and bouldering grades in the world (including Doctor Dolittle, graded E10 7a, and Detox, graded V11). In July 2015, three routes at Curbar (Dr. Dolittle, The Zone, and Knockin' on Heavens Door) were ranked in the top 20 hardest traditional climbs in the UK. Some examples of indicative climbs are (from the easiest to the hardest):

Climbing	Length	Grade	Climbing	Length	Grade
Beech Gully	trad, 36 ft (11 m)	D	Maupassant	trad, 32 ft (9.8 m)	HVS 5a
Flying Buttress Right	trad, 32 ft (9.8 m)	S 4a	The Peapod	trad, 60 ft (18 m)	HVS 5b
Campion Groove	trad, 52.4 ft (16.0 m)	S 4a	L'Horla	trad, 32 ft (9.8 m)	E1 5b
Campion Overhang	trad, 52.4 ft (16.0 m)	HS 4b	Elder Crack	trad, 59 ft (18 m)	E2 5b
Purple Quartz	trad, 29.5 ft (9.0 m)	HS 4b	Right Eliminate	trad, 55.7 ft (17.0 m)	E3 5c
Beech Buttress	trad, 36 ft (11 m)	VS 4b	Moon Walk	trad, 39.3 ft (12.0 m)	E4 6a
Little Innominate	trad, 20 ft (6.1 m)	VS 5a	Don't Slip Now	trad, 39.3 ft (12.0 m)	E5 6a
Two Pitch Route	trad, 79 ft (24 m)	VS 5a	Knockin' on Heavens Door	trad, 60 ft (18 m)	E9 6c
Short Slab	trad, 26 ft (7.9 m)	HVS 5a	Doctor Dolittle	trad, 50 ft (15 m)	E10 7a

=== Guides ===
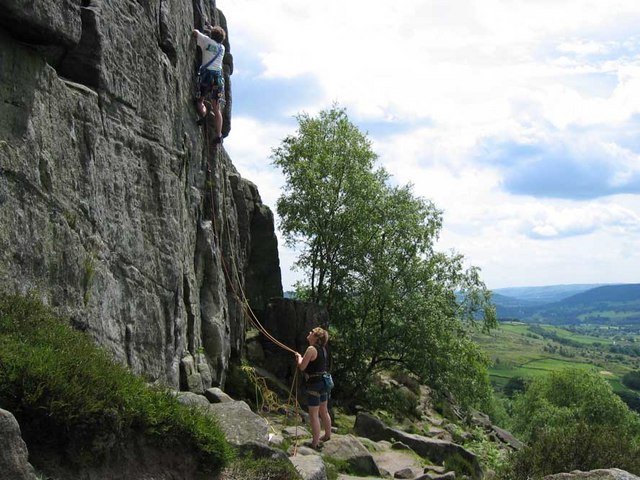
Rock climbing route

The rock climbing on Curbar Edge has been widely documented in journals, magazines, books, dedicated guidebooks, and websites. The Edge was omitted from the earliest Gritstone rock climbing guides, Laycock's Some Gritstone Climbs, published in 1913, and Fergus Graham's Recent Developments on Gritstone, published in 1924, because of access restrictions related to the neighboring grouse moors. Early climbs were originally published privately in the pages of climbing club journals. These were collated in the Climbs on Gritstone series of regional guides, starting in the 1950s, notably in sections by Wilf White in 1951 in Climbs on Gritstone: Sheffield Area, and by White and Sorrell in 1957 in Further Developments in the Peak District.

The Edge is covered in a wide range of current publications. The British Mountaineering Council includes climbs on Curbar Edge in two current guidebooks: Froggatt to Black Rocks (2010) and On Peak Rock (revised edition, 2003). A selection of climbs are also included in a selective regional guide to the Eastern Edges. Bouldering problems on Curbar Edge are covered in a dedicated regional guide Peak Bouldering, by Williams and James.

== Other activities ==
=== Grouse shooting ===
The Eastern Moors are unsettled partly because of the setting aside of this region in the 19th century, by giant estates, for grouse shooting. Grouse hunting has been practised in the area for centuries, but can now only take place in some areas not owned by the National Park Authority. Since 1981 sports shooting has not been allowed on its properties, which correspond to 4–5% of the land.

=== Walking ===
==== Eastern Edges Walk ====
The path along Curbar Edge is part of several long-distance walks, including the 25-mile Eastern Edges of the Peak District.

==== Curbar Gap ====
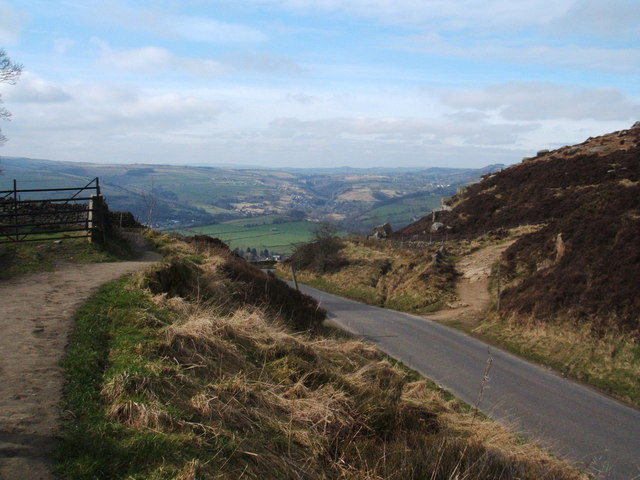
Road at Curbar Gap.

The Curbar Gap is a short route leading to the view of Derwent Valley. The route measures 853 ft (260 m) from the car park to the top, the closest facilities are Baslow and Calver. In ancient times, this Gap was a packhorse route subsequently it became a turnpike in 1759; for this reason is possible to see, close to the car park entry, a guide stoop made of stone.

==== Calver Village to Curbar Edge ====
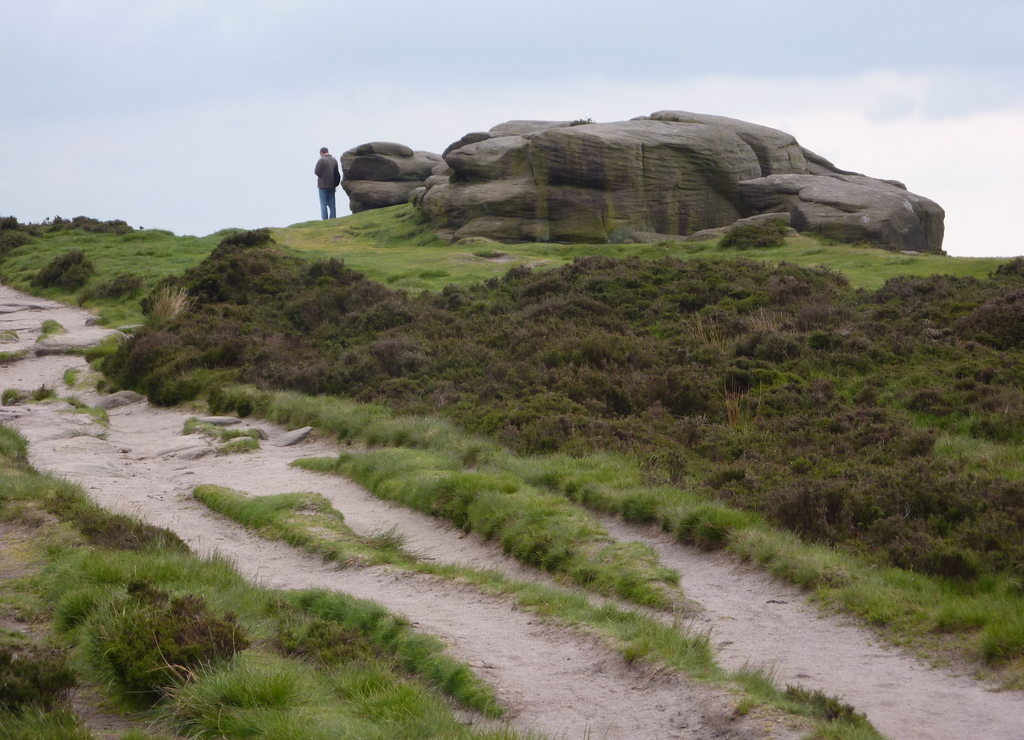
The footpath behind Curbar Edge.

This walk is four miles (6.4 km) long and the time needed to complete it is approximately two hours. The beginning of the walk is located next to the Derwent River, it is possible to get there by car, there is a parking lot close to Calver Primary School; and also by bus which goes from Buxton to Bakewell. The ascent of the path is 820 ft (250 m).

==== Froggatt, Curbar and White Edge ====
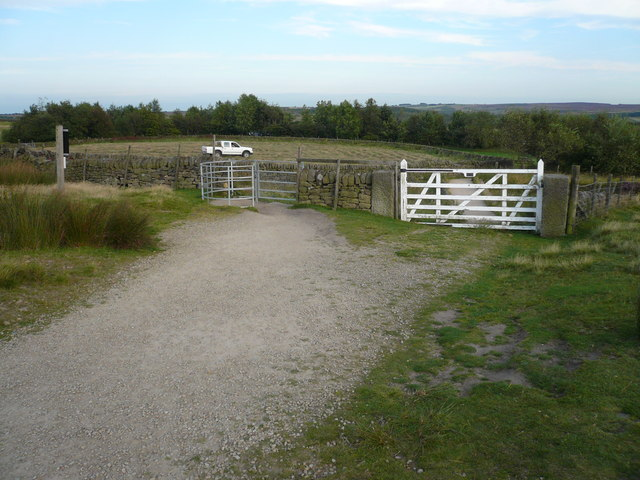
Entrance to Curbar Edge footpath.

This walk covers Curbar Edge, White Edge, and Froggatt Edge. It consists of a six-mile (9.7 km) loop around the three Peak District Edges. The starting point is at the National Trust car park, the walk keeps going firstly into Curbar Edge, secondly to Froggatt Edge and lastly to White Edge. From this point is possible to complete the loop by reaching the car park at Curbar. The distance covered by this walk is six miles (9.7 km), the time needed to complete the loop is between two and three hours and the highest point reached by the following path is 1,217 ft (371 m). The distance from the car park to Froggatt Edge is 1.4 miles (2.3 km), from Froggatt Edge to White Edge the distance is 2.1 miles (3.4 km), the last stage, from White Edge to Curbar Edge is about 2.4 miles (3.9 km). It is possible to reach this walk by car and also by public transportation by arriving at the Grindleford train station, located 1.1 miles (1.8 km) from the beginning of the walk.

==== Froggatt, Curbar and Baslow Edge ====
The total distance covered by this walk is eight miles (13 km), the needed time to complete the route is between 4 and 5 hours. The path reaches Froggatt Edge, Curbar Edge, and Baslow Edge, it also passes the villages of Curbar, Froggatt, Calver and Grindleford. The walk starts and ends at the National Trust car park. By following this path it is possible to see the Stoke Flat Circle, a prehistoric feature from the Bronze Age; the Big Moor; Derwent Valley Mills; River Derwent; Calver Hill, a rock-climbing point known as Eagle Stone which was used in the past to test the strength of men; the Calver Mill Gallery, Froggatt Wood and Grindleford church.

=== Cycling ===
==== Cycling climb ====
The average gradient of this route is 10%, while the peak gradient is 15,2%; the difference of elevation from the starting point to the end is 597.1 ft (182.0 m). The path starts close to the All Saints' Church in the village of Curbar. The steepest uninterrupted mile is 10.7% and the steepest quarter mile is 12.1%. Curbar Edge also hosts the annual championship called the British University Cycling Championship.

==== Curbar Edge loop ====
This route measures 11.1 miles (17.9 km), and the time needed to complete it is one hour and nineteen minutes. This path includes some segments in which are forbidden to cycle, these traits are located 2.52 miles (4.06 km) and 2.67 miles (4.30 km) miles after the beginning of the loop, the first segment is 462 ft (141 m) long and the second one reaches 567 ft (173 m). This route also includes a series of steps,15 ft (4.6 m) long, located 2.52 miles (4.06 km) from the starting point. The route is made of different way types, such as: a single track of 0.51 miles (0.82 km); a footpath of 4.11 miles (6.61 km); an access road measuring less than 327 ft (100 m); cycleway measuring less than 327 ft (100 m); a section of street measuring 1,194 ft (364 m); a road measuring two miles (3.2 km); and, a state road 4.15 miles (6.68 km) long.

==== Curbar Gap ====
This route is 13.67 miles (22.00 km), the average slope is 7.1%. In the beginning, the altitude is 410.1 ft (125.0 m) while at the top is 935 ft (285 m). This route is ranked 9682 globally and 305 in the United Kingdom.

==== Lady Canning's Bridleway ====
The length of this path is 25 miles (40 km), the time needed to complete it is three hours and thirteen minutes. The maximum altitude is 1,377.9 ft (420.0 m), the minimum is 311.68 ft (95.00 m). This path includes some segments in which are forbidden to cycle, the first segment is located after 4.46 miles (7.18 km) and measures 0.38 miles (0.61 km); the second segment is found after 12.67 miles (20.39 km) and it measures 396 ft (121 m). There are different types of tracks: singletrack measuring 4.85 miles (7.81 km); path long 5.3 miles (8.5 km); cycle lane measuring 1,937 ft (590 m); side road long 9.7 miles (15.6 km); road measuring 10.8 miles (17.4 km); A-road long 1.97 miles (3.17 km).

=== Hang gliding ===
Because of its particular conditions, Curbar Edge is a suitable hang gliding and paragliding location for expert pilots. The prevailing wind direction in this location is south-west and west-south-west, and the hang gliding site code is 8.010. The take off location is placed at 1,050 ft (320 m) for both hang gliding and paragliding. The bottom landing is limited and it has to be checked before launching; there is only one existing bottom landing noticeable with an "L" sign. In the case of light winds it is possible to land right after the take off; in case of stronger winds landing on the moorland is recommended.

== In literature ==
=== In poetry ===
Curbar Edge is cited in the title of the poem "Night On Curbar Edge" written by William Watson (poet). The poem is part of "The Yellow Book/Volume 1".

=== In art ===
Curbar Edge has been painted by a local Derbyshire artist, Martin Davis. The painting was created in 2013, it is acrylic on canvas and it is made following the Impressionism movement.

=== In other literature ===
Several climbs on the edge have had dedicated essays on them published in anthologies, including Profit of Doom, Linden, Right Eliminate and Elder Crack.

== In film ==
Curbar Edge is featured in several films, including:

- Threads (1984)
- The Big Issue (1996)
- Hard Grit (1998)
- Young James (2007)
- Head Games (2007)
- Grit Flick (2009)
- Progression (2009)
- Wide Boyz (2012)

== Curiosities ==
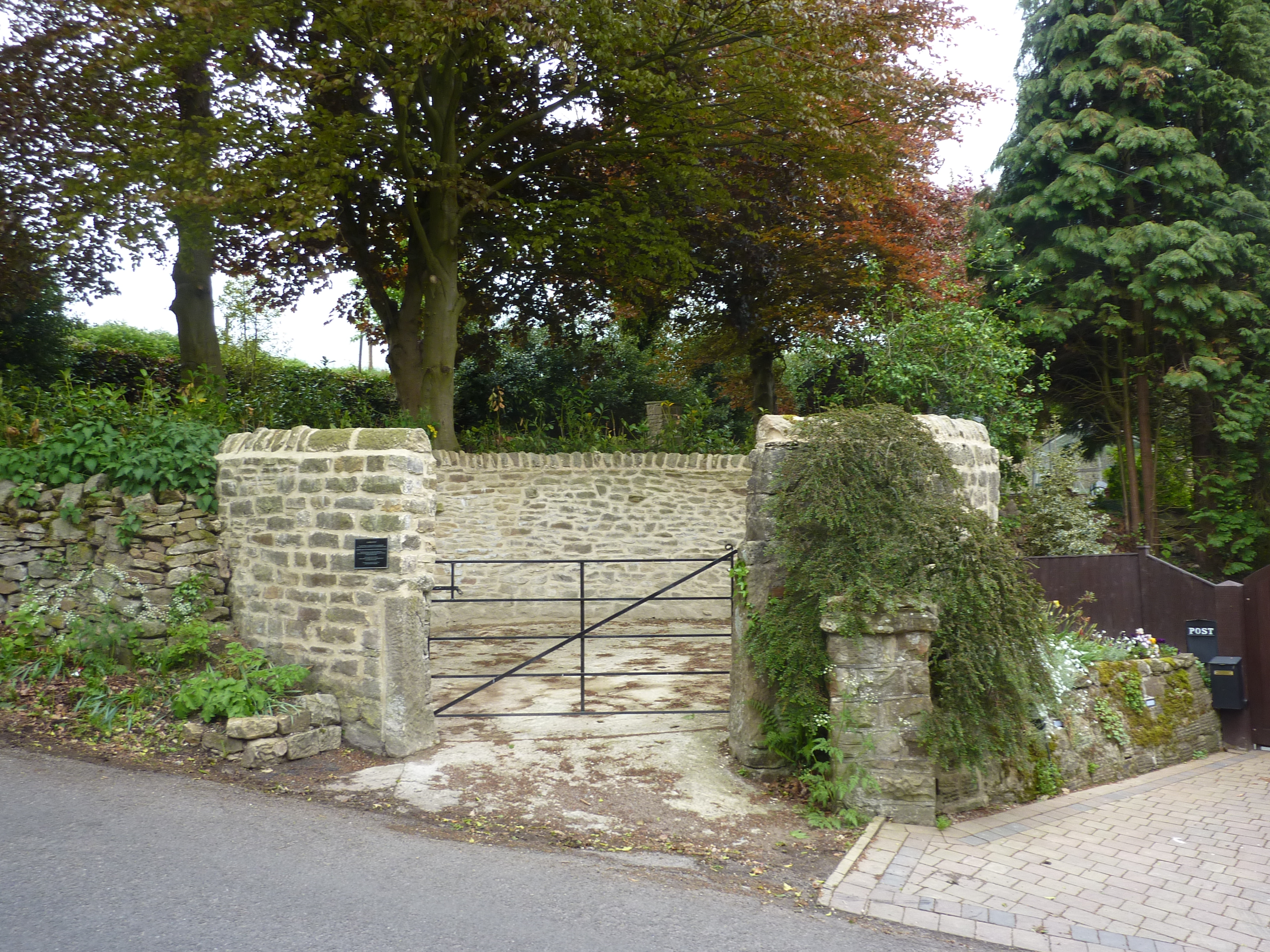
Curbar Pinfold.

- The Bible Stones: carved stones with biblical references can be found between Curbar Gap and Curbar village. These were made in the 19th Century by Edwin Gregory, the mole catcher for the Duke of Devonshire, as a sign of gratitude after going through a serious illness. To find these stones, there is a telephone box on Curbar Hill, with a map of the route from the Bridge Inn to Curbar Gap including places of interest.
- Curbar Pinfold: is an enclosure built to contain stray animals that were found in the private properties of the inhabitants of Curbar. These animals were kept in the pinfold, at the expense of the owner, until a fine was paid. It is situated at only 0.7 miles (1.1 km) from Curbar Edge, on the south side of Pinfold Hill up from the River Derwent, it was restored in 2010.
- Curbar Lockup: is a building dating from the 18th century, built around 1780. It was located in the corner of a field near the Cundy Graves northeast of Lane Farm. As a lockup, it is believed to have been used to hold prisoners in overnight custody while they were in transit to other prisons or court hearings. For example, during the English Civil War, before being transported to Sheffield Prison and Sheffield Assizes, Curbar lockup was used to guard the prisoners overnight. A recent rumor says that Curbar lockup was used as a pest house, which was a building owned by the municipality, on the edge of the villages, used to contain the plague patients, in which they remained until complete recovery or in case of death. This building, since the 19th century, was used as domestic accommodation. The last permanent residents of the house were a sailor named Francis Pelly and a deaf-mute named Ebenezer Barratt, known locally as Yebby. The house remained inhabited until shortly before the outbreak of the Second World War, in fact, it was declared uninhabitable in 1935. It stands out as a square-based structure made up of coursed rubble gritstone. The two-stored building presents on the southeast side square windows, on the northeast side a stack and a massive doorway on the southwest.
- Curbar Shelters: built by local people, these stone shelters dating back to the 18th and 19th centuries can be found near Curbar Edge. They protected farmers and cattle, they appear as structures made up of randomly arranged stones placed near walls. They are now covered with vegetation.

== Books ==
Publications containing content about Curbar Edge:

- Nunn Paul, Rock climbing in the Peak District: A photographic guide for rockclimbers, 1930
- Westlake Dave, Froggatt to Black Rocks, 2010
- Dawson Carl, On Peak Rock: The Best Rock Climbs of the Peak District, 1993
- Crags Chris, Eastern Grit (Rockfax Climbing Guide Series), 2015
- Williams Allen, Peak Bouldering, 2014
- Wilson Ken, Extreme Rock: Great British Rock Climbs, 1987
- Wilson Ken, Hard Rock: Great British Rock Climbs, 1981
- Simon Warren, 100 Greatest Cycling Climbs
- James Allen, 50 Classic Cycle Climbs

== Similar edges ==
- Derwent Edge
- Stanage Edge
- Upper Burbage Edge
- Lower Burbage Edge
- Froggatt Edge
- Baslow Edge
- Gardom's Edge
- Birchen Edge
- White Edge

== See also ==
- List of places in Derbyshire
- Derbyshire Dome
- Millstone Grit
- Rock climbing in the Peak District
- Climbing History
- Peak District
- Curbar
- Joe Brown
- British Mountaineering Council
- William Watson (poet)
- River Derwent

== Gallery ==
Overview of Curbar Edge
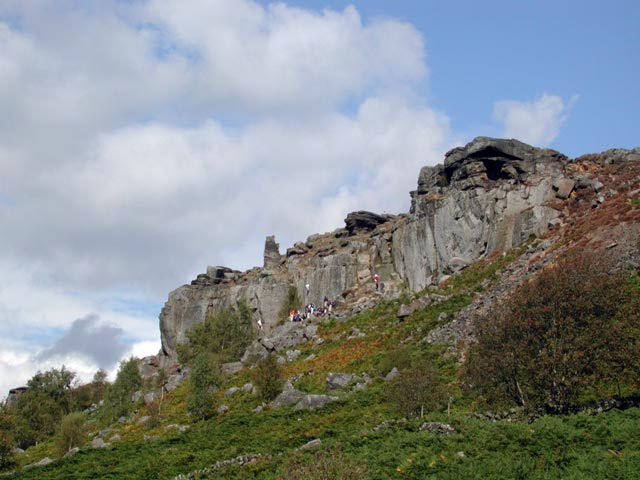
Photo of Curbar Edge seen from below, located at the following coordinates: 53° 16′ 18.48″ N, 1° 36′ 50.4″ W

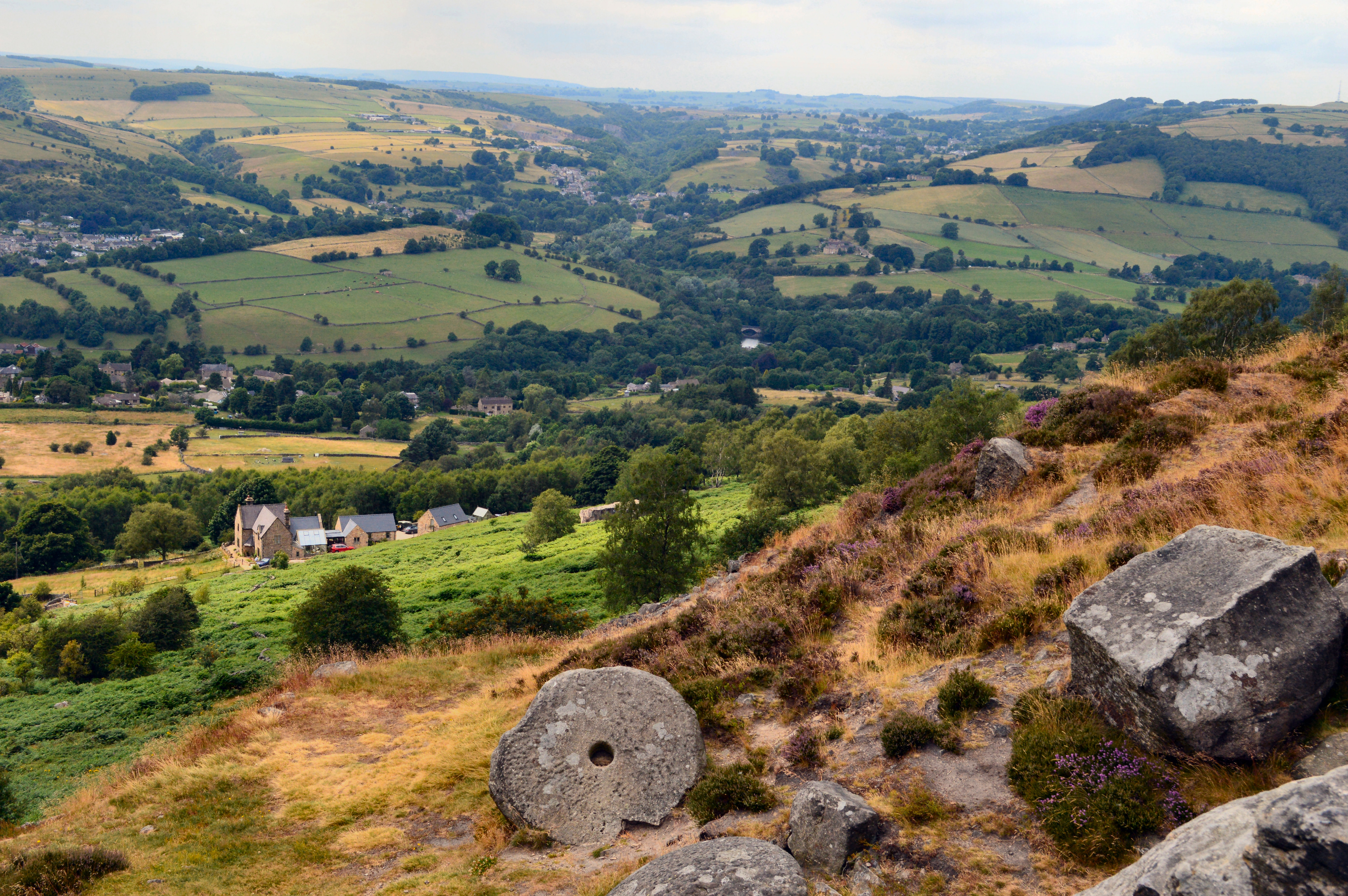
View from Curbar Edge towards New Bridge, Derbyshire, UK.

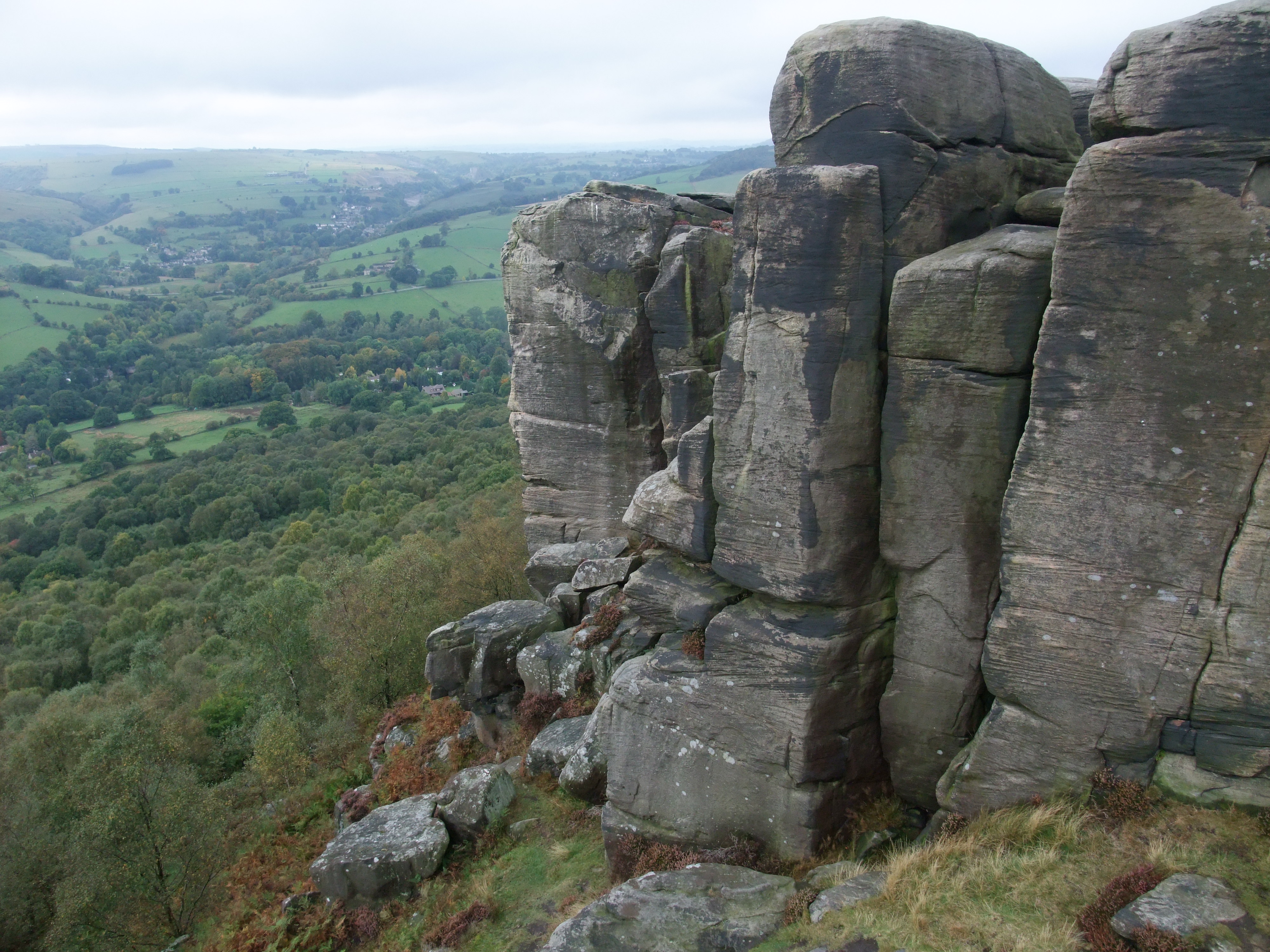
Curbar Edge, from Baslow and Bubnell. The picture was taken at the following coordinates: 53° 16′ 37.36″ N, 1° 37′ 8.03″ W

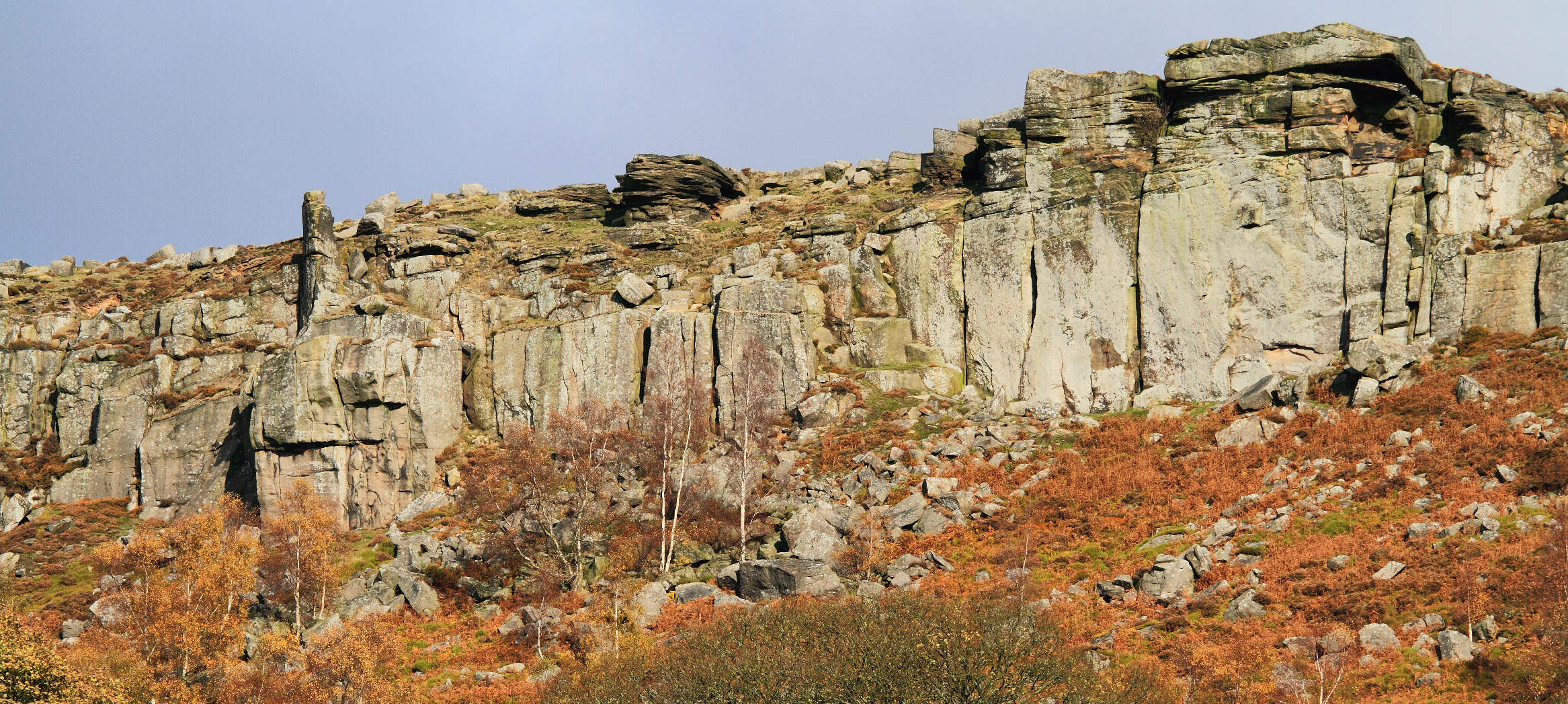
Displaying the Eliminates area, upland and the heath, Derbyshire, UK.

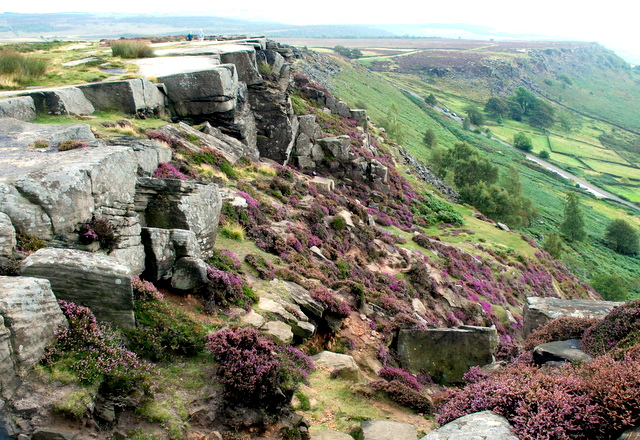
Along Curbar Edge. Baslow Edge can be noted in distance, situated at the other side of Curbar Gap, Derbyshire, UK.
