= Derbyshire Dome =

Geological formation of the Derbyshire Peak District

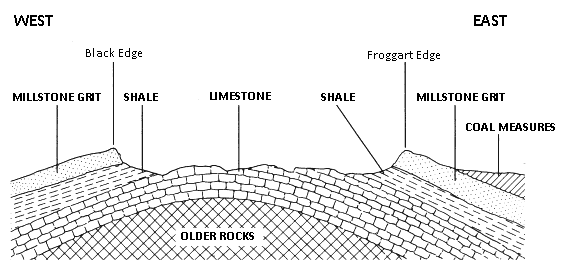
A cross section of the Peak District showing the structure of an eroded dome

The Derbyshire Dome is a geological formation across mid-Derbyshire in England.

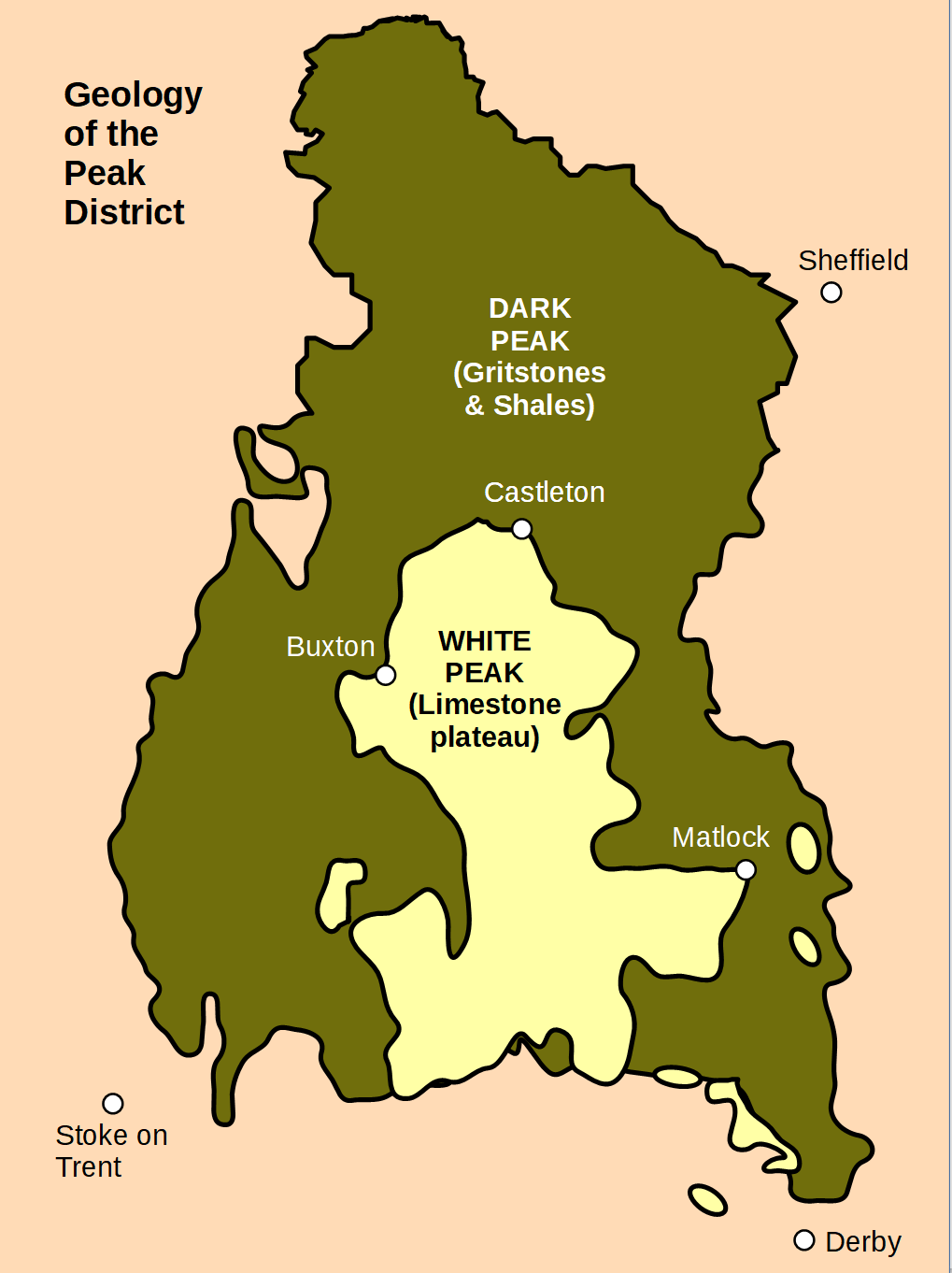
Geology Map of the Peak District

The White Peak area of the Peak District is named after the limestone plateau landscape of the 'Derbyshire Dome' anticline. The plateau is generally between 200m and 300m above sea level. This limestone outcrop is surrounded on the west, north and east by a horseshoe-shaped formation of younger sandstones (gritstones) and shales, known as the Dark Peak. The town of Buxton is at the western edge of the limestone region. The Triassic sandstones of the Midlands plain bound the south edge of the limestone region. The other main karst landscapes of England are the Yorkshire Dales and the Mendip Hills.

== Formation ==
The layers of carboniferous limestone were formed from the carbonate shells of countless invertebrate sea creatures, deposited in a warm shallow sea in the Brigantian stage of the Carboniferous period (around 330 million years ago). About 30 million years later, coarser debris from rock erosion was washed onto the earlier shell layers. These deposits were compressed over time into rocks which were subsequently uplifted and folded into a dome. Later erosion of the younger Namurian-age sandstones (the finer shales and the rougher gritstones) has exposed the limestone strata. The shells can be seen as fossils (crinoids, trilobites and shellfish) in the limestone outcrops, cliffs and caves. At times when parts of the sea bed rose, plants grew and their decayed remains formed a few shallow deposits of coal on the western side of the dome. Volcanoes around the sea bed spewed out lava flows which have formed local outcrops of volcanic basalt (dolerite).

The Peak District is rich in minerals, formed from geothermal fluids being forced up through the fissures in the limestone. When these cooled and crystallised they formed widespread hydrothermal mineral veins of galena ore (lead sulphide), fluorospar, barytes, calcite and copper. Large veins are known as 'rakes'.

Dolomite is a more resistant form limestone, created where magnesium has been introduced into the rock by ground water. Outcrops such as Rainster Rocks are found between Carsington and Hartington.

The many steep-sided limestone dales (such as Chee Dale, Deep Dale, Lathkill Dale, Monk's Dale and Monsal Dale) have been formed by glacial meltwater erosion of the Visean-age limestone plateau.

== Features ==
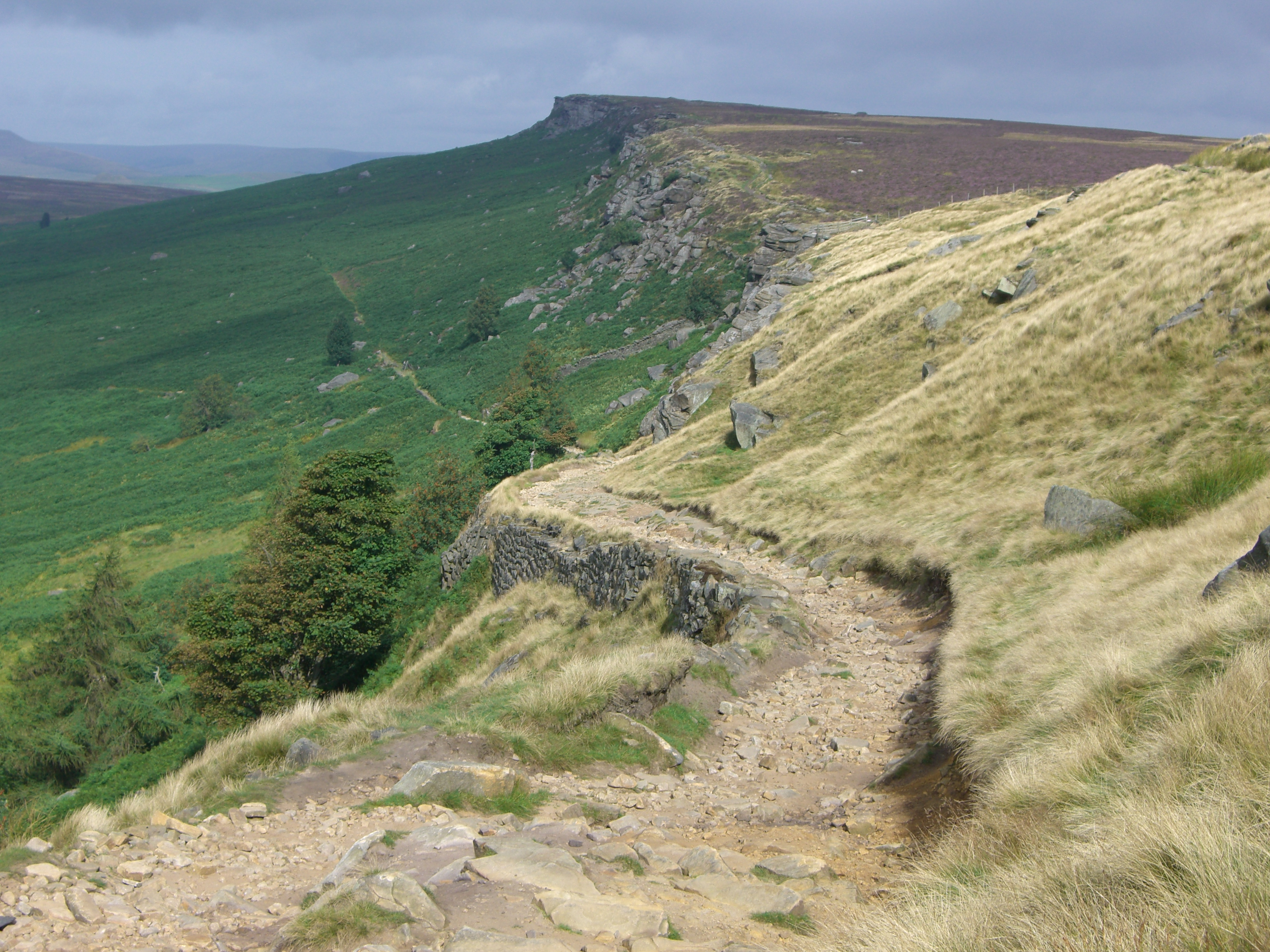
Stanage Edge gritstone escarpment

There are gritstone escarpments where the limestone plateau meets the Dark Peak horseshoe. These include:

- on the west (from south to north): The Roaches, Axe Edge, Burbage Edge on Goyt's Moss and Black Edge on Combs Moss
- on the north: Rushup Edge and Kinder Scout
- on the east: (form north to south): Derwent Edge, Stanage Edge, Burbage Rocks, Froggatt Edge, Curbar Edge, Baslow Edge, Gardoms Edge, Birchen Edge and Chatsworth Edge

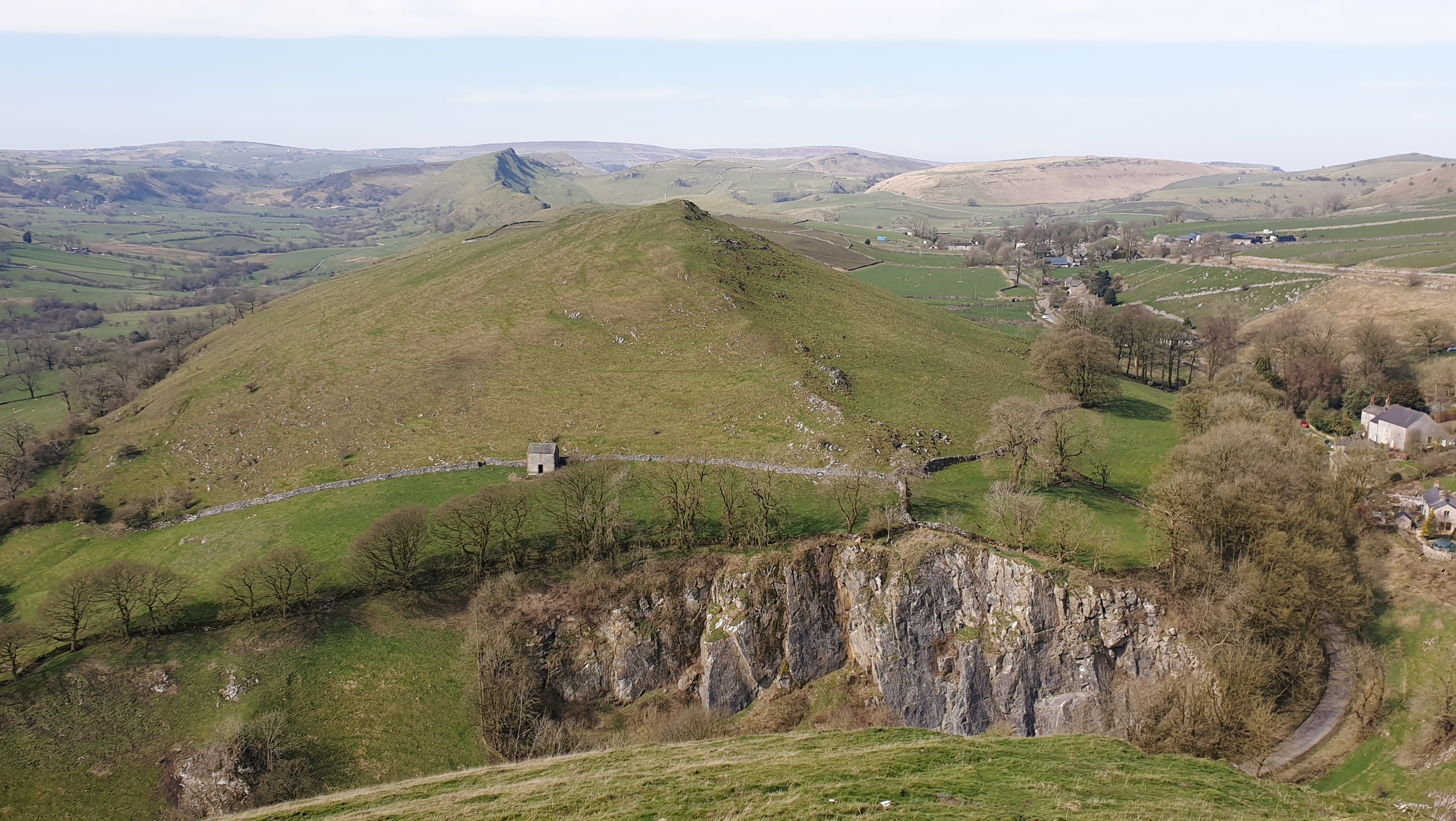
White Peak limestone scenery - Parkhouse Hill & Chrome Hill from High Wheeldon

The sequence of alternating limestones and basalts in the Derbyshire Dome anticline was established between John Whitehurst in 1778 and White Watson in 1811, and John Farey provided names for them in 1811. From west to east the limestone strata include:

- 'Bee Low' limestones (at Buxton, Wye Valley, Via Gellia and Matlock) including the 'Millers Dale' bed and 'Chee Tor' bed (a particularly fine limestone formed when the ancient tropical sea was at its calmest)
- 'Woo Dale' limestones (at Buxton, Wye Valley and Matlock)
- 'Monsal Dale' limestones (at Wye Valley, Lathkill Dale and Matlock)
- 'Eyam' limestones (at Ashford-in-the-Water and Eyam) including Ashford and Cawdor beds

Over millions of years, acidic groundwater has travelled through the limestone bedding planes and joints forming underground chambers and channels. This has created typical fluviokarst features of dry valleys, steep-sided gorges, and cave systems with stalactites and stalagmites. Numerous rivers disappear into underground channels in places called 'swallets' and reappear as springs in places called 'resurgences'. Many limestone dales have 'winterbourne' streams which flow in winter and after heavy rains but dry up over summer months. The gorge of Winnats Pass has cliffs up to 100m high. Dovedale, Deep Dale and Miller's Dale are other steep-sided gorges formed by Ice Age melt water.

Notable caves are: Poole's Cavern at Buxton; Speedwell Cavern, Treak Cliffe Cavern, Blue John Cavern, Peak Cavern (the Devil's Arse) and Titan Cave (the deepest in Britain) at Castleton; Great Masson Cavern at Matlock, Thor's Cave in the Manifold Valley, Dove Holes in Dovedale and over 3 km of cave passages at Middleton Dale. Many Stone Age, Bronze Age and Roman artefacts (including animal and human remains) have been found in several of these caves, such as Dowel Cave, Fox Hole Cave and Thirst House. Their archaeological importance is recognised in them being designated as Scheduled Monuments. Ice Age animal bones were found by quarrymen in 1901 in an underground chamber at Victory Quarry at Dove Holes. These included sabre tooth tiger, mastodon, hyena and rhinoceros. Finds in fissures at other Buxton quarries have included bison and lion bones.

The limestone crags, cliffs and quarries and the gritstone edges of the Peak District offer some of the most challenging rock climbing in Europe, with over 10,000 graded routes. Popular locations with extensive routes include Stanage Edge, Froggatt Edge, The Roaches, Chee Dale and Middleton Dale.

== Industry ==
Limestone has been quarried in the Peak District since Roman times. It was used as building stone, for road aggregate and for making lime (also known as quicklime). Lime is produced easily by heating limestone and it has been used in mortar since ancient times, for fixing together the stone blocks of buildings. Lime has also been used as a soil improver in agriculture since the Middle Ages. There are hundreds of lime kilns from the 17th to 19th centuries and associated spoil heaps at many sites across the White Peak. Limestone is used in lead smelting as a flux to remove impurities. Millions of tons of limestone are removed from Derbyshire quarries every year. Buxton is the largest centre in Britain for limestone quarrying. Other large quarries are at Longcliffe near Matlock.

The larger outcrops of dolerite in the White Peak are quarried at Waterswallows Quarry near Buxton and at Ible Quarry near Bonsall. Dolerite is used as an ornamental stone (for buildings, memorials, paving, etc.) and is crushed for use in construction aggregate (for roads, railways, buildings, and dams).

Lead ore (galena) has been mined across the White Peak since at least Roman times and until the last mine closed in the 1950s. The Romans used lead for water pipes, cisterns and weights. Lutudarum near Matlock was the administrative centre for Roman lead mining. Numerous lead pigs (ingots weighing about 50kg) bearing the mark for Lutudarum have been discovered in Derbyshire, near Hull and in Sussex. Principal lead mining sites include Lathkill Dale, Odin Mine at Castleton, Magpie Mine (a well-preserved mining complex), Bonsall and Via Gellia, Winster and Wirksworth. Limestone aquifers meant that mines were prone to flooding and so expensive drains (soughs) and pump engines were needed when extracting lead ore from deeper mines. The rock bearing the galena ore was crushed and smelted in cupola furnaces to extract the lead. Mined rock veins contained 10% or less galena, so mining sites are characterised by many spoil heaps of waste.

Copper has been mined in the Peak District since the Bronze Age. Ecton Mines (Deep Ecton and Clayton) on the western edge of the Peak were a major complex for mining copper ore until their closure in 1891. The site is a protected Scheduled Monument.

Fluorspar was originally mined in the Peak District as a flux for iron smelting. Modern uses are for glass manufacture and production of hydrogen fluoride (with wide-ranging applications from pharmaceuticals to refrigerants). Sallet Hole Mine is a 19th-century fluorspar mine in the centre of Coombs Dale, which closed in 1998. Nearby Cavendish Mill has been a processing centre for fluorspar since 1965. Also there was a major fluorspar mining centre at Masson Hill above Matlock. Blue John is a purple and yellow banded fluorspar that is unique to the Peak District, only found in Blue John Cavern and in Treak Cliff Cavern at Castleton. It was prized in Victorian times for ornaments and jewellery.

== See also ==
- White Peak
- Dark Peak
- Peak District
- Geology of national parks in Britain
- Buxton lime industry
- Derbyshire lead mining history
