= Rock climbing in the Peak District =

Climbing areas of England

Rock climbing is a popular activity in the Peak District; particularly on edges such as Stanage or Froggatt. Generally the climbing style is free climbing (as opposed to aid climbing) and the rock is either gritstone or limestone. Climbing has been practised in the Peak District since the late 19th century; James W. Puttrell is generally credited with starting the sport. The first climbing guidebook to the area was Some Gritstone Climbs, by John Laycock, published in 1913. There are over 10,000 routes in the Peak District. One of the most famous Peak District climbers, and a pioneer of many new routes, is Ron Fawcett. The climb known as "Master's Edge", on Millstone Edge, near Hathersage, is a testament to his skill and strength. The climb is graded E7 6c and rises 19m up the near vertical edge.

== Gritstone ==
The gritstone crags include:

Western Grit (Staffordshire, Kinder, Bleaklow, and the Chew Valley)

- The Roaches
- Hen Cloud
- Ramshaw
- Windgather
- Castle Naze
- Kinder Scout
- Shining Clough
- Dovestones Edge
- Ravenstones
- Rob's Rocks
- Wimberry

Eastern Grit (Derwent Valley, Sheffield, Derbyshire)

- Rivelin Rocks
- Stanage Edge
- Derwent Edge
- Burbage Rocks
- Millstone Edge
- Froggatt Edge
- Curbar Edge
- Birchen Edge
- Gardom's Edge
- Black Rocks
- Bamford Edge
- Higger Tor
- Dovestone Tor (on Derwent Edge)
- Cratcliffe Tor
- Baslow Edge

== Limestone ==
In-situ bolts and pitons are more acceptable on limestone and some crags are almost exclusively bolted.

- Beeston Tor
- Chee Dale
- Deep Dale
- High Tor
- Middleton Dale
- Pic Tor
- Raven Tor
- Thor's Cave
- Wild Cat
