= Stanage Edge =

Escarpment in the Peak District, England

Coordinates: 53°20′50.25″N 1°37′59.74″W

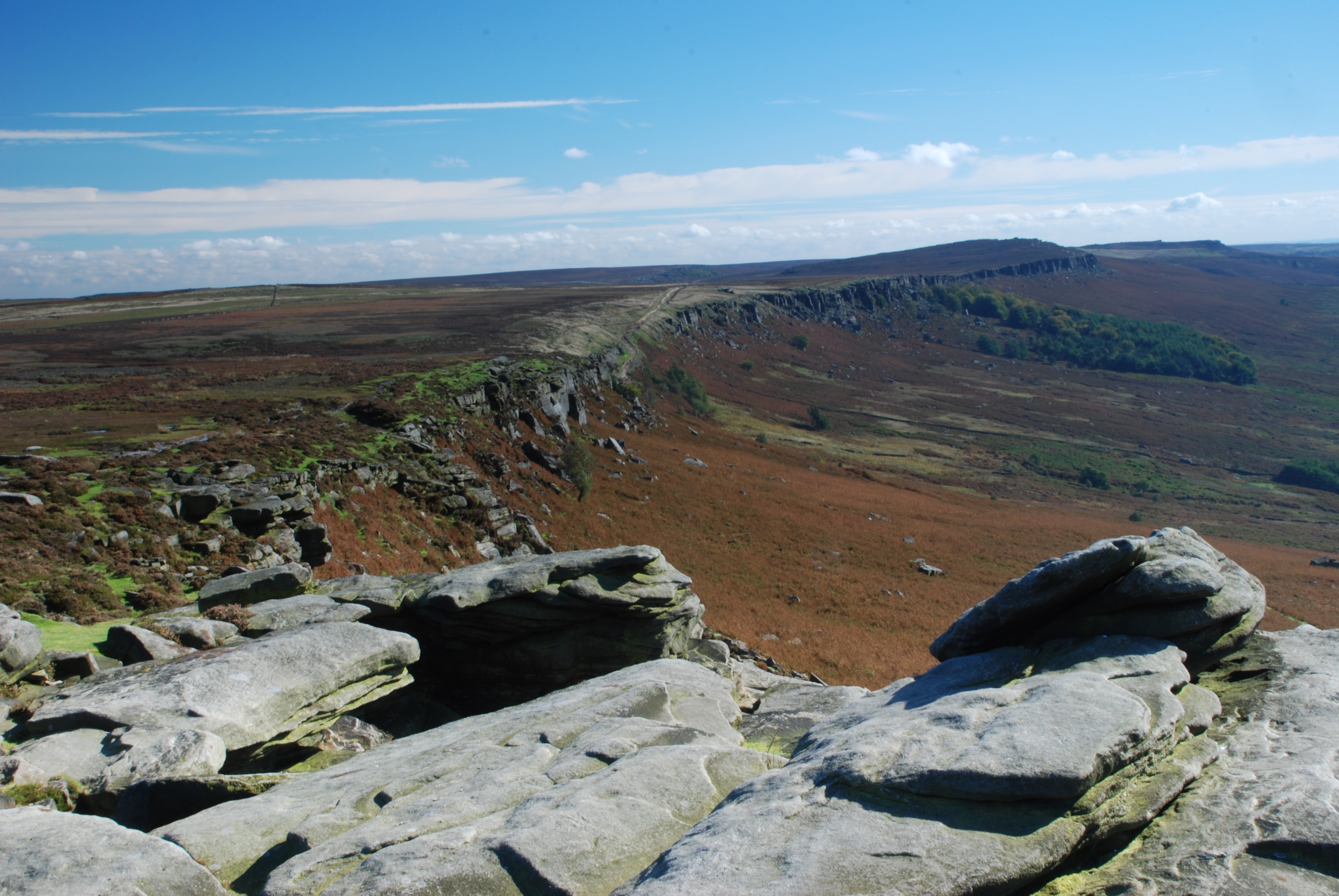

Highest point
- Elevation: 458 m (1,503 ft)
- Prominence: c. 103 m

Geography
- Location: Derbyshire / South Yorkshire
- Parent range: Peak District
- OS grid: SK228853
- Topo map: OS Landranger 110

Stanage Edge, or simply Stanage (from "stone edge") is a gritstone escarpment in the Peak District, England, famous as a location for climbing. It lies a couple of miles to the north of Hathersage, and the northern part of the edge forms the border between the High Peak of Derbyshire and Sheffield in South Yorkshire. Its highest point is High Neb at 458 metres (1,503 ft) above sea level. Areas of Stanage were quarried in the past to produce grindstones, and some can still be seen on the hillside—carved, but never removed.

== Features ==
A paved packhorse road ran along the top of the edge, and remains of it can be seen, as can remains of the Long Causeway, once thought to be a Roman road which works its way over the edge on its route from Templeborough to Brough-on-Noe, crossing Hallam Moor and passing Stanedge Pole (note the slightly different spelling), an ancient waymarker on the route to Sheffield. Some cairns along the top are even older, and there is a well-known cave in the cliff known as Robin Hood's Cave. More recent features include early 20th-century drinking basins, designed to collect pure rainwater for grouse to drink.

During the construction of the Rivelin tunnel a sighting tower was constructed on the edge to assist in surveying the route of the tunnel. All that remains of the tower is a heap of stones at Ordnance Survey grid reference SK226862.

== Sport ==
=== Rock climbing ===
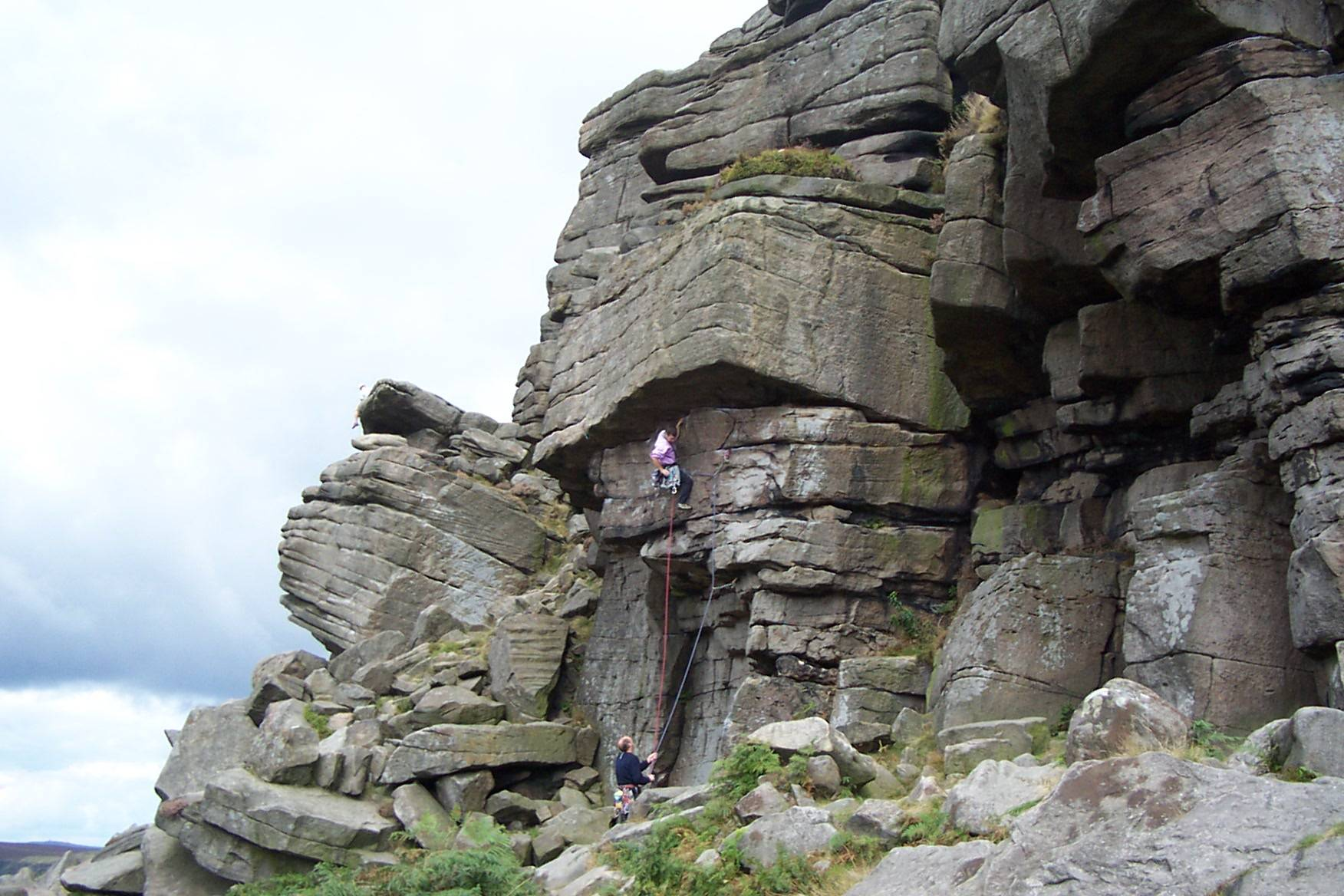
Climbers on The Tippler (graded E1 5b)

Stanage's naturally weathered Millstone Grit face is now known as a highly popular location for rock climbing in the Peak District. The edge runs three miles north from the Cowper Stone to Stanage End. It is the northernmost of an almost continuous line of cliffs, including Burbage Rocks, Froggatt Edge, Curbar Edge, Baslow Edge and Birchen Edge. The Cowper Stone is a block of gritstone at the most southerly point of Stanage. Set alone a few hundred metres from the last buttress of the main crag, it is a large boulder with distinctive rounded breaks running across it. It is the scene of some classic hard-grit routes of the 1980s first climbed by protagonists such as Johnny Dawes and John Allen. The Edge was notably omitted from the first rock climbing guidebook to the Peak District, Some Gritstone Climbs by John Laycock, published in 1913, due to the then severe access restrictions to the land. It has subsequently been featured regularly in over a century of regular climbing guidebooks, which document the growth in the number of routes and the rise in climbing standards.

Although the edge reaches only 25 metres in height it is one of the most famous UK climbing venues: aside from having a multitude of routes close to a major population centre, it is home to the route Right Unconquerable (HVS 5a), which, when first climbed by Joe Brown in 1949, was considered a milestone achievement in British climbing. In spite of its height, the edge is home to the longest recorded rock route in the United Kingdom; the 5000m Girdle Traverse, completed by Ron Fawcett in 1992 and graded "E5 6b(ish)".

=== Running ===
Stanage is a magnet for walkers and runners. The Fat Boys Stanage Struggle is a popular local fell race that starts in Hathersage—altitude 91 metres (299 ft)—and routes up to and along Stanage Edge to High Neb—458 metres (1,503 ft)—before returning to the village 367 metres (1,204 ft) below. The 19 September 2021 edition of the event was won in a time of 40m 51s by Michael Kenyon of Dronfield Running Club; there were 224 finishers.

== Wildlife ==
Stanage Edge is home to upland birds including ring ouzel, curlew, lapwing, wheatear, stonechat and raven, and birds of prey including kestrel and buzzard.

== In popular culture ==
The location has featured in films and television series, most notably in the 2005 film Pride and Prejudice during a scene in which Elizabeth Bennet (portrayed by Keira Knightley) is seen facing the horizon from the Edge.

== Gallery ==
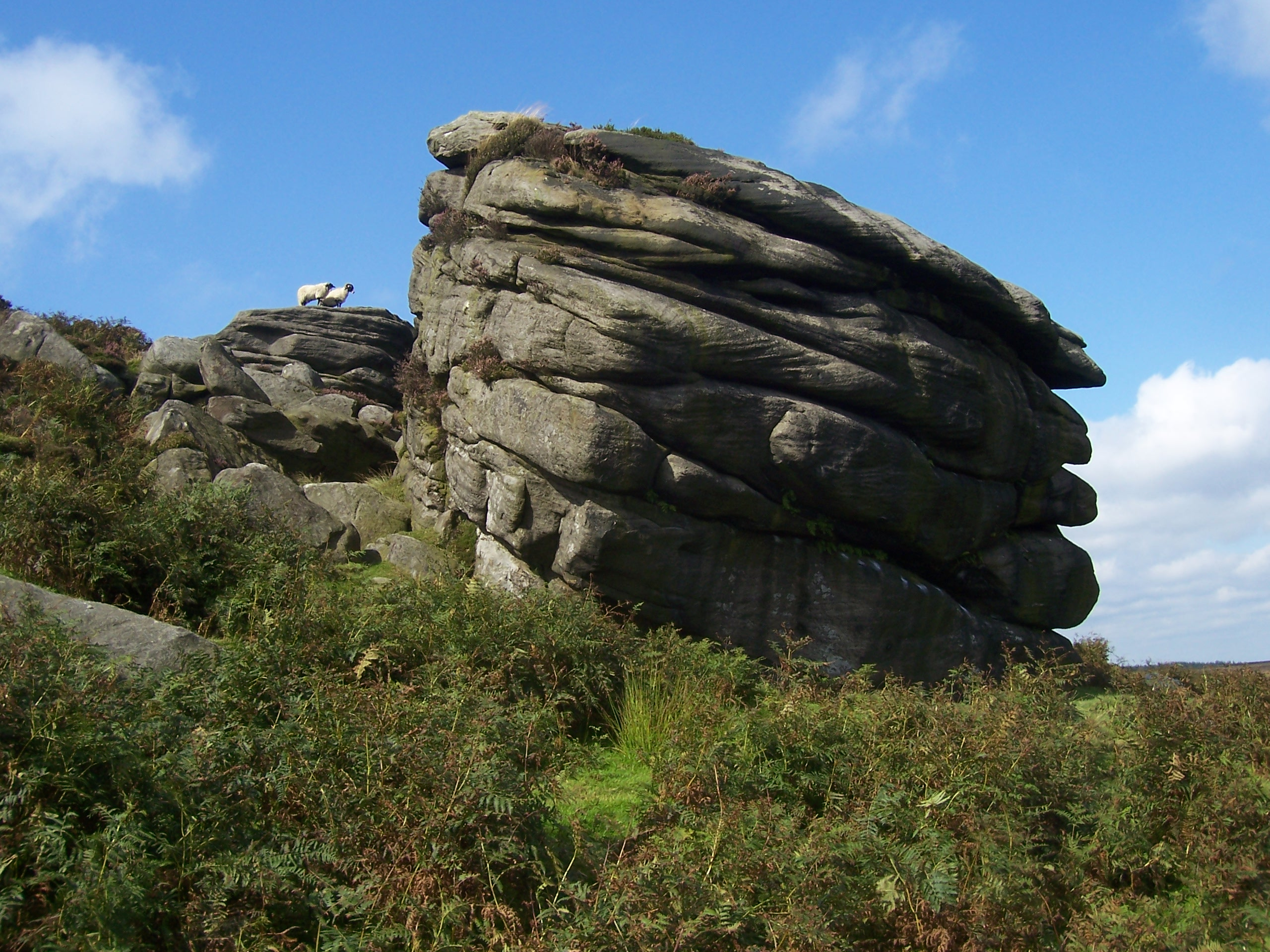
The Cowper Stone

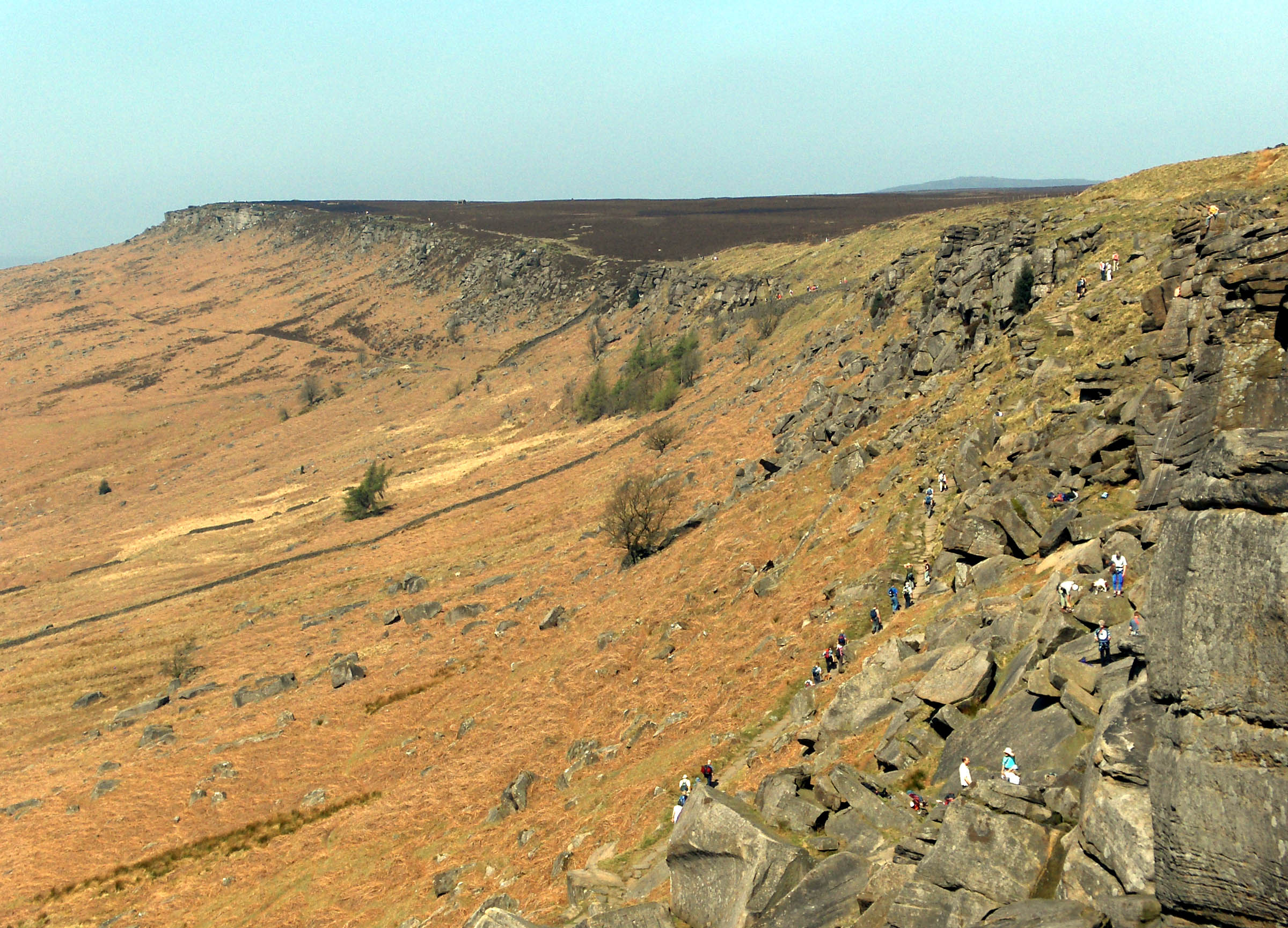

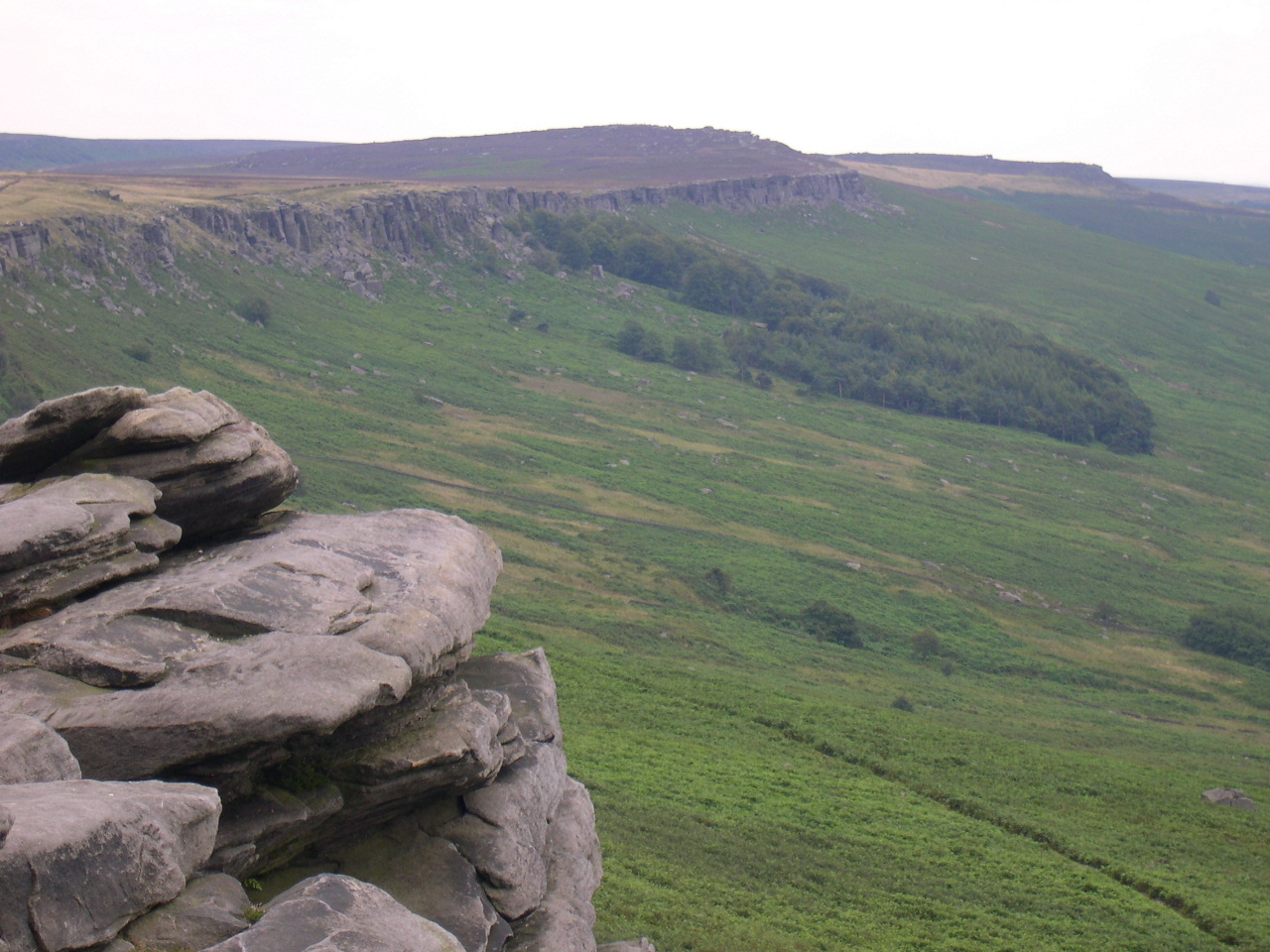

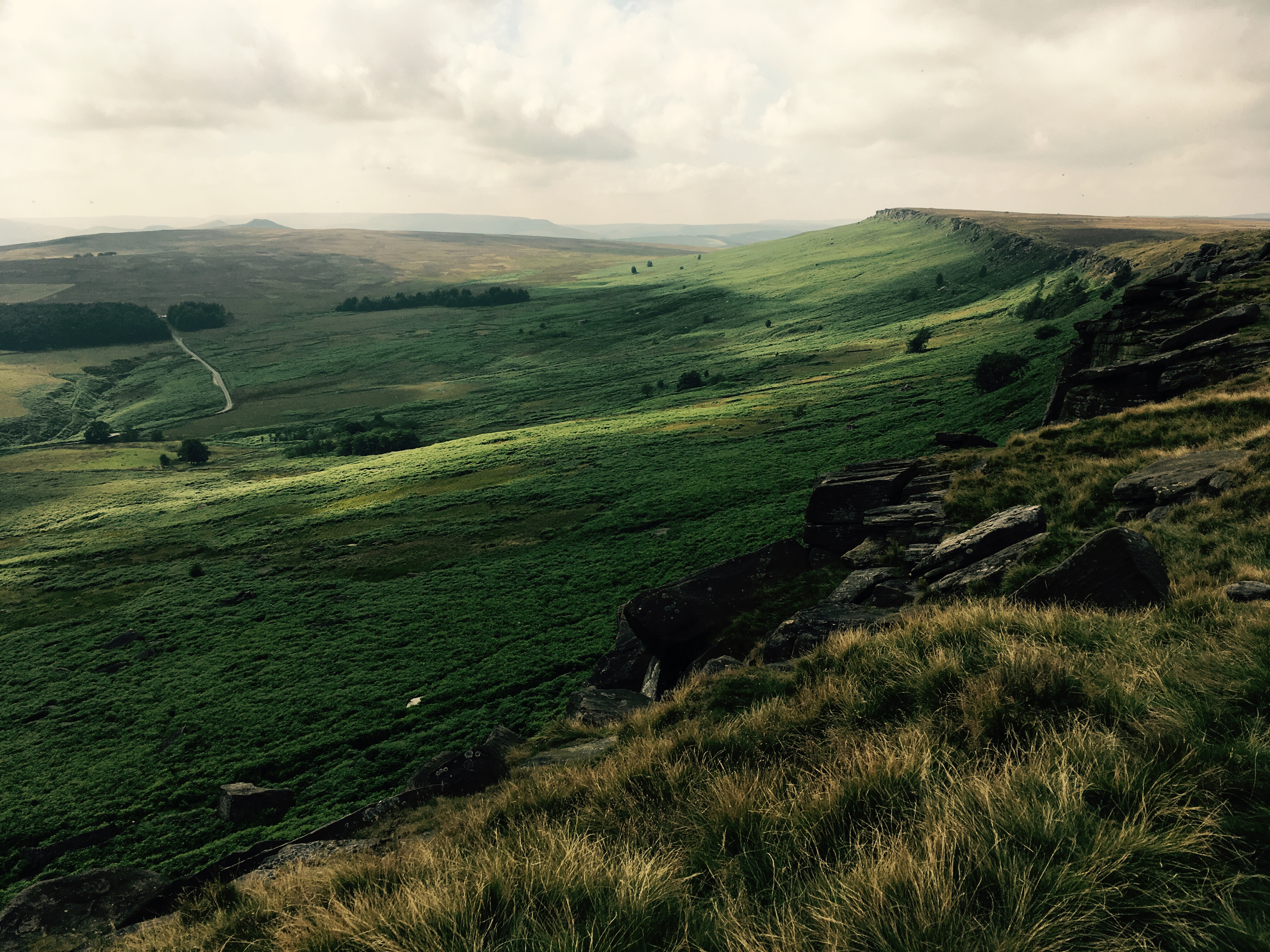

== See also ==
- Standedge, a moorland escarpment and Pennine crossing point
