= Windgather Rocks =

Rock formation in the Peak District

Coordinates: 53.30165°N 2.01046°W

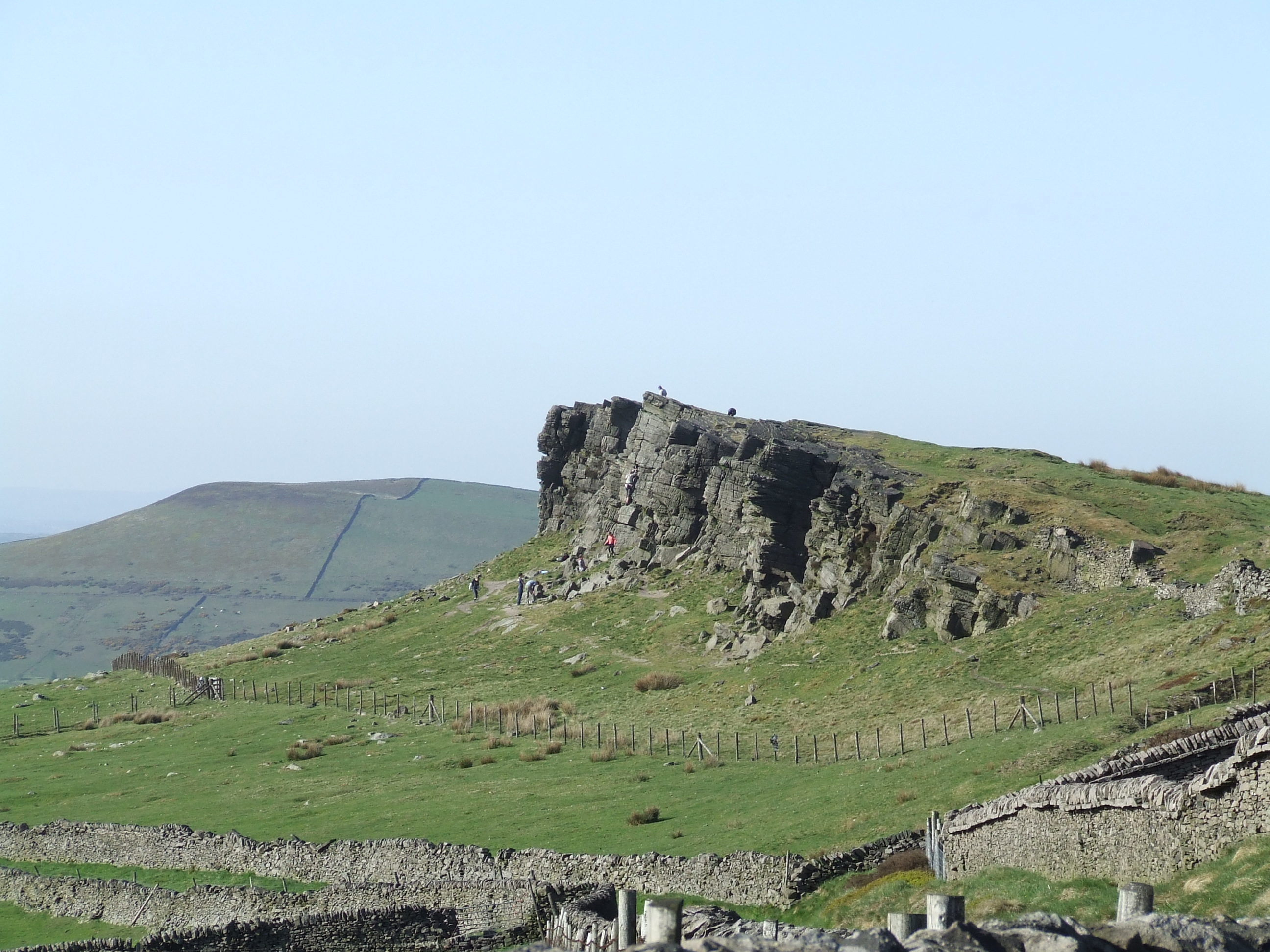
- Windgather Rocks from the south

- Location within Derbyshire
- OS grid reference: SJ994783
- District: High Peak
- Shire county: Derbyshire
- Region: East Midlands
- Country: England
- Sovereign state: United Kingdom
- Police: Derbyshire
- Fire: Derbyshire
- Ambulance: East Midlands

The Windgather Rocks (416 metres/1,365 ft a.s.l.) is a gritstone crag on the Derbyshire–Cheshire border in England. It is in the Peak District National Park and is a popular site for learning the rudiments of rock climbing. As the name suggests the area is exposed to the prevailing westerly winds. The rocks lie above Taxal Edge and are part of a north–south ridge that starts between Kettleshulme and Whaley Bridge and culminates at Shining Tor. The crag was featured in the first guide to rock climbing in the Peak District, Some Gritstone Climbs, published in 1913 and written by John Laycock.
