= Some Gritstone Climbs =

Climbing guidebook, 1913

- Author: John Laycock
- Language: English
- Subject: Guidebooks: Rock Climbing
- Publisher: Refuge Printing Department, Manchester
- Publication date: 1913
- Publication place: United Kingdom
- Media type: Print (hardcover)
- Pages: 116 pp (first edition)

Some Gritstone Climbs is a rock climbing guidebook written by British lawyer John Laycock (1887–1960). The book's subtitle, included uniquely on the frontispiece, is Some Shorter Climbs (in Derbyshire and Elsewhere). It was published in Manchester in 1913 by the Refuge Printing Department (then an insurance company). Although focusing on rock climbing in the Peak District, it covers several adjacent cliffs outside this region, and despite its title, referring to the Millstone Grit (or gritstone) geology of many of the cliffs, it includes several cliffs consisting of other rock types, including mountain limestone and red sandstone.

It is regarded as the first-ever published rock climbing guidebook for the Peak District National Park. Some Gritstone Climbs is one of the earliest guidebooks to rock climbing in the United Kingdom: Climbing in the British Isles by Walter Parry Haskett Smith was published in 1894 and the climbing guide The Climbs on Lliwedd, by J. M. A. Thompson and A. W. Andrew, in 1909.

== Physical description ==
The book is 16 cm × 12 cm, contains 14 leaves of plates, and has 116 pages. It has 11 initial pages (including the frontispiece and preface), and 116 pages of content. It is in hardback format, with a dark green cover. The book has three short, single-page appendices: Appendix I (Limestone Climbs), Appendix II (a short list of 'severe climbs'), and Appendix III (a brief bibliography). The book contains a dedication to 'S. W. Herford', referring to Siegfried Herford, a pioneer rock climber and close friend of Laycock. Herford went on to climb the famous Central Buttress route on Sca Fell and was killed at Ypres in 1916, shortly after the book's publication.

== Main sections: climbing areas covered ==
The following climbing areas are covered in the book. Some are now known by other names, such as Stonnis Rocks (now more commonly known as Black Rocks), or have ceased to be popular climbing venues, such as Coombes Rocks. All are still subject to modern access arrangements, clearly defined in the relevant current guidebooks. Some of the major climbing venues in the Peak District were omitted, such as Stanage Edge and Wharncliff Crag, due to access restrictions at the time.

- Alderley Edge, an escarpment of red sandstone in Cheshire, near Manchester.
- Almscliffe Crag, a Millstone Grit crag between Leeds and Harrogate.
- Alport Stone, also known as Alport Height, and the adjacent Andle Stone.
- Beeston Castle, a sandstone face below Beeston Castle, in Cheshire.
- Blackstone Edge, a gritstone escarpment on the Pennine Way, above Rochdale.
- Bosley Cloud, also known as The Cloud, is a partially quarried gritstone outcrop on the Derbyshire–Staffordshire border
- Brassington Rocks, an outcrop of dolomitic limestone near Wirksworth, Derbyshire.
- Castle Naze, a gritstone outcrop on Combs Moss, near Combs, Derbyshire
- Coombes Rocks, a small gritstone outcrop near Glossop, Derbyshire
- Cratcliff Tor and Robin Hood's Stride, a gritstone outcrop near Bakewell, Derbyshire.
- Black Rocks, or Stonnis Rocks, near Cromford, Derbyshire.
- Harboro' Rocks, an outcrop of dolomitic limestone near Brassington, Derbyshire.
- Hathershelf Scout, an escarpment of millstone grit near the village of Mytholmroyd, Yorkshire.
- Helsby Cliff, a sandstone cliff in Cheshire.
- Kinder Scout, a range of gritstone cliffs on the edges of a peat plateau, near Edale in Derbyshire.
- Laddow Rocks, a gritstone cliff near Crowden, Derbyshire.
- Whimberry Rocks, a gritstone escarpment now known as Wimberry Rocks, above Dovestone Reservoir near Greenfield, Lancashire.
- Windgather Rocks, a gritstone edge near Whaley Bridge, Derbyshire.

== Original publication and reviews ==
The manuscript was finished in 1911, but not published for another two years. The book was originally sold for 3 shillings and 6 pence. The Rucksack Club was opposed to the publication of the book as a number of the crags described, including those on Kinder Scout, were on private property and the club was concerned about trespass law. The club committee, influenced by the solicitor Charles Pickstone, withdrew its support. Laycock resigned from the club, of which he was a founder member, in disgust. The book was finally published by the Refuge Printing Department at Strangeways (a branch of the Manchester and Salford Boys' and Girls' Refuges and Homes), with financial support from four friends. A very early review appeared in the Yorkshire Ramblers Club Journal in 1913, in which it was noted that the book was "liable to be dismissed by a percentage of mountaineers as a Baby Book on Toy Climbs". It was also stated that: "Mr. Laycock has modelled this unpretentious little volume somewhat on the lines of "Climbs on Lliwedd" and "Climbing in the Ogwen District," and is, I think, to be congratulated on his effort. In one respect he is entitled to unqualified approbation: he has not sinned the sin of understating difficulties". The same review critiqued the selection of crags and climbs, some of the latter being described as "merely fancy gymnastics".

Some Gritstone Climbs has been widely cited in subsequent literature relating to climbing and the Peak District. It was first referenced in its year of publication by a Baddeley Guide to The Peak District of Derbyshire and the Neighbourhood as "A recent work gives an excellent synopsis of climbing in the district on millstone' grit – viz.: "Some Gritstone Climbs in Derbyshire and Elsewhere." By John Laycock. 3s. 9d. net. Refuge Press, Manchester." It was also referenced in the club documents of several climbing clubs at the time, including by the Yorkshire Ramblers' Club in 1913, who stated: "In his little volume, Some Gritstone Climbs, Mr. J. Laycock speaks of the Buxton Boss, an excrescence of gritstone on the side of Coombs Moss, not far from Buxton. If this be the boulder I have in my mind, it is also known as the Buckstone and Robin Hood's Stone and, in addition to presenting several attractive little problems, possesses a peculiar historic interest all its own."

== Significance ==
Some Gritstone Climbs is regarded as "the first pocket climbing guidebook". The book is significant for its early date, its rarity, and for the historical perspective on both the format and the sport. It was one of the earliest British climbing guides to use a system of detailed Grade (climbing) for specific climbs. It included the following different classifications for climbs: Moderate; Moderately Difficult; Difficult; Decidedly Difficult; Distinctly Difficult; Very Difficult; Severe. This extended the simple 4-grade system published in Owen Glynne Jones 1900 book Rock Climbing in the English Lake District. Laycock pioneered much of the early exploration at many of the cliffs included in the guide. For example, at Helsby, where 'The Overhanging Crack' was considered at that time to be one of the hardest "gritstone" climbs in England. Laycock's guide was the first to document climbs at many of the crags featured in the book, such as Blackstone Edge, and it has been regarded as the first 'modern' approach to climbing guides. Some cliffs, such as Laddow Rocks, had already been documented in private climbing club publications, and in the 1903 book Moors, Crags & Caves of the High Peak and the Neighbourhood by Ernest A. Baker, but Some Gritstone Climbs was the first to collate cliffs and climbs into a regional guide. It was never republished and exists solely as the original 1913 1st edition.

As noted by subsequent gritstone pioneers such as H. M. Kelly: "Laycock's little book Some Gritstone Climbs has had a much greater influence than its size and subject would indicate". It is regarded by climbing historians as a historical 'snapshot' of the pioneering explorations of 'the first gritstone tigers'. It also disseminated information, publicized recent new ascents, and allowed the next generation of climbers to develop newer and harder routes. For example, it was in the hands of Piggot, Wood, and Wilding in 1920 when they made the first ascents of Lean Man's Climb, Sand Buttress, and Lone Tree Gully at Black Rocks.

== Use in subsequent climbing guides ==
A supplement to Laycock's book was published in 1923 as Recent Developments on Gritstone, edited by Fergus Graham. This was in response to new explorations in Yorkshire and the Peak District and was jointly published by The Rucksack Club, Gritstone Club, and the Yorkshire Ramblers' Club. This in turn started the trend for increasingly regular regional climbing guides, both in the Peak District and elsewhere in the UK. This led, after the Second World War, to the first series of guidebooks to cover all the gritstone crags in the Peak; a publication pattern that continues to the present day. This series commenced in 1948 with The Climbs on Gritstone Series, Volume 1: The Laddow Area, edited by Harry Parker. Subsequent volumes were published for The Sheffield Area, 1951 (Volume 2); Kinder, Roaches and Northern Areas, 1951 (Volume 3); Further Developments in the Peak District, 1957 (Volume 4); West Yorkshire Area (Volume 5). These and other guidebooks used the format, grading system, and approach of Laycock's original Peak guide, but with a more succinct style. Like the original book, these later guides acted as a 'snapshot' of their generation, and a basis for the next advances in rock climbing standards in the Peak District.

== Bibliography ==
- Baker, E. (1902). Moors, Crags & Caves of the High Peak and the Neighbourhood. Manchester: John Heyword Ltd.
- Byne, E.; Sutton, G. (1966). High Peak: The Story of Walking and Climbing in the Peak District. London: Seeker & Warburg.
- Laycock, John (1913). Some Gritstone Climbs. Manchester: Refuge Printing Department.
- Thompson, Simon (2010). Unjustifiable Risk: The Story of British Climbing. London: Cicerone Press.
