= Birchen Edge =

Climbing areas of England

Coordinates: 53.2526°N 1.5834°W

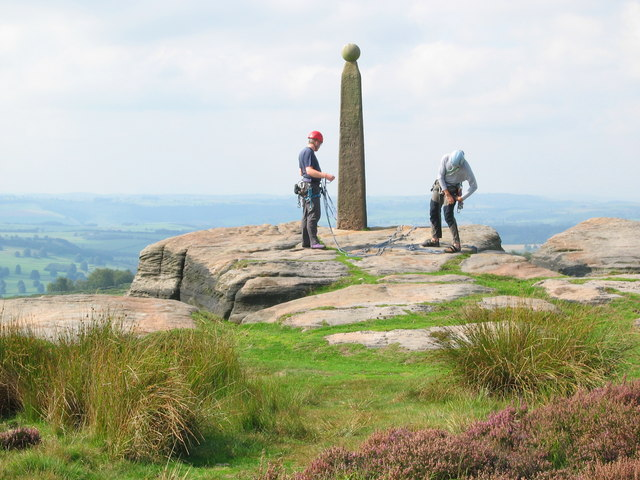
Nelson's Monument

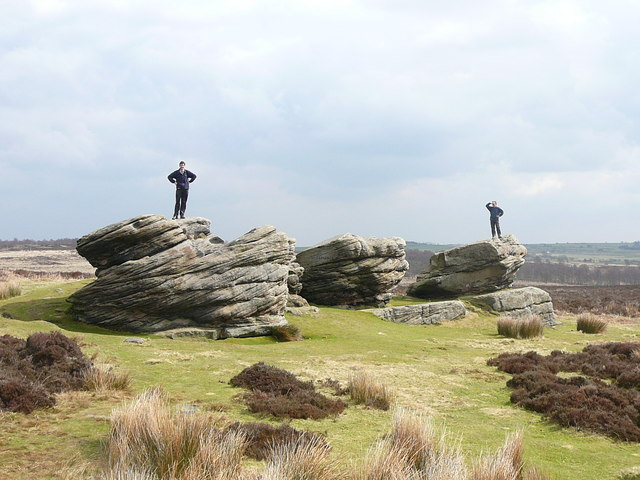
The "Three Ships" outcrops on Birchen Edge

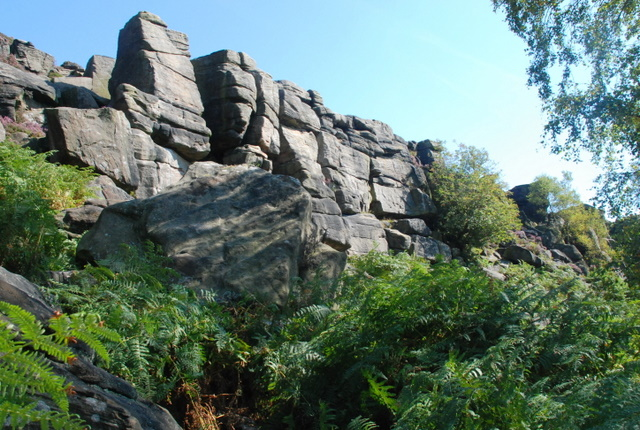
Birchen Edge from below

Birchen Edge is a gritstone rock face in the Peak District, England, popular with walkers and novice climbers as most of the climbing routes are in the lower grade.

== Walking ==
Birchen Edge provides an easy high-level walk with views over the nearby village of Baslow and part of the Chatsworth House estate. The edge is backed by a moorland plateau. Access is via a public footpath from the Robin Hood Inn on the A619 road, about 6 1/2 miles (10.5 km) from Chesterfield. Nearby Gardom's Edge and Blackstone Edge may be incorporated into a circular walk. The Peak District Boundary Walk runs along the edge past Nelson's Monument.

== Nelson's Monument ==
The monument consists of a 3-metre gritstone column with a 30 cm ball on top. It was erected in 1810 by a local businessman from Baslow called John Brightman, in honour of Lord Nelson and was restored in 1992 by the 1805 Club. Three nearby outcrops called the "Ship Rocks" have been carved with the names of three of Nelson's ships: Victory, Defiance and Royal Soverin (sic).

== Climbing ==
There are generally good belays to be found at the tops although there are a couple of areas such as Stoker's Wall where it can be tricky. The starts can also be quite awkward where the crag is undercut. Classic routes include The Crow's Nest (climbing grade VS), Nelson's Slab (HVS), Sail Buttress (VS), Sail Chimney (S), Topsail (VS), Orpheus Wall (HVS), Peaches (E4), Trafalgar Crack (V Diff), Camperdown Crawl (VS) and Powder Monkey Parade (S – but do not underestimate it).

It was also the titular inspiration for the recently built Birchen Apartments at Sheffield University.

== See also ==
- Rock climbing in the Peak District
