= John Laycock =

Singaporean lawyer (1887–1960)

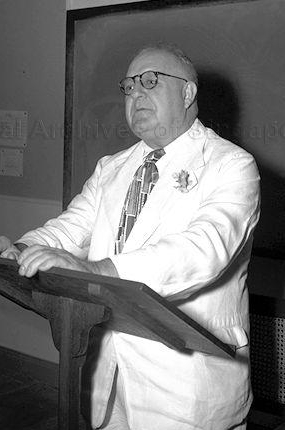
- Laycock in 1951

Personal details
- Born: Christopher John Laycock; 1887 Manchester, England
- Died: 3 December 1960 (aged 72–73) State of Singapore
- Resting place: Bidadari Cemetery, Singapore
- Party: Singapore Progressive Party
- Children: Amy Ede (adopted)
- Profession: Lawyer; politician

Christopher John Laycock (1887 – 3 December 1960) was an English-born Singaporean lawyer who was the founder of one of Singapore's earliest law firms, Laycock and Ong. He was also a founder of the Singapore Progressive Party and served as Member of the Legislative Assembly from 1948 to 1959.

== Early life ==
Laycock was born in 1887 and grew up in Manchester, England. He was an influential figure in the early development of rock climbing on the gritstone edges of the Peak District of Derbyshire along with his close friends Siegfried Herford, also of Manchester, and Stanley Jeffcoat of Buxton. In 1903, Laycock became a founder member of the Manchester-based Rucksack Club, which included local climbing enthusiasts such as Charles Pilkington of the glass manufacturing dynasty. Laycock, Herford and Jeffcoat climbed numerous new routes on the escarpments of Derbyshire, Staffordshire and Yorkshire in the years leading up to the First World War. These were recorded in Laycock's guidebook, Some Gritstone Climbs, the first published guidebook on rock climbing in the Peak District.

Concerned about trespassing, the Rucksack Club had opposed the publication of the book as a number of the crags described were on private property. Laycock thereafter resigned from the club, and the book was published by the Refuge Printing Department (then an insurance company in Manchester) in 1913. In the years that followed, both Herford and Jeffcoat were killed on the Western Front in World War I; Laycock left England for Singapore in 1920.

== Laycock and Ong ==
Laycock was admitted to the Singapore bar in 1924, then working at the firm Braddell Brothers. He went on to found Laycock and Ong, one of Singapore's first law firms. Among Laycock's employ was Lee Kuan Yew, who later became the first Prime Minister of Singapore. Lee's wife, Kwa Geok Choo, and brother Dennis also worked in the firm. In the 1951 legislative council election, Lee represented the Progressive Party, a political party that Laycock had founded, as an election agent. Lee also represented trade unions and activist organisations whilst working for Laycock, which served as preparation for Lee's own eventual political career. Eventually, Laycock requested for Lee to stop taking on such cases.

Other notable lawyers who have worked for the firm include Anamah Tan. Laycock and Ong dissolved in 1999.

== The Island Club of Singapore ==
Laycock founded the Race Course Golf Club, Singapore's first multi-racial club, on 1 October 1924 at Farrer Park. The club included Asians who wanted to learn to play golf but could not join the exclusively European Royal Singapore Golf Club. It lasted for three years, before being evicted by the Turf Club landowners, who had sold the land.

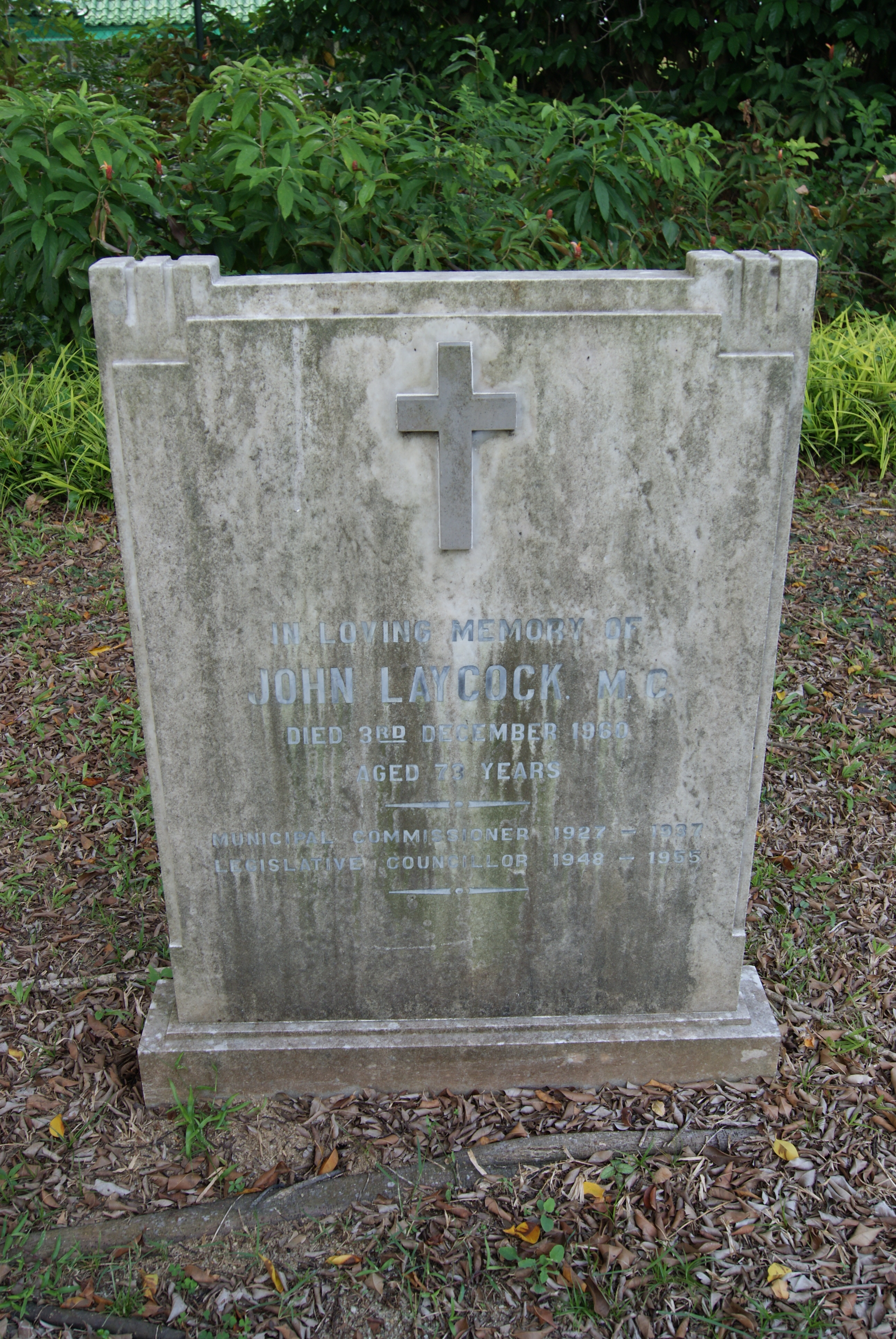
Gravestone of John Laycock, Bidadari Garden, Singapore

In 1929, Laycock found a location in the MacRitchie catchment area for a new club. He, then a Municipal Commissioner of Singapore, and his friends A. P. Rajah and Tan Chye Cheng, received approval for the club at the General Committee Meeting of the Singapore Municipal Council on 28 June 1929. Design for the 18-hole course was done by Peter Robinson of Braid Hills, Edinburgh, and construction began in March 1930. Laycock and his grounds committee, with members such as Harold Lim, supervised the project for the next two years. The new club was officially opened and renamed The Island Club on 27 August 1932, officiated by Sir Cecil Clementi, Governor of Singapore. Sir Chan Sze Jin CMG (S.J. Chan) became the club's first President, and Laycock took on the role as First Captain.

== Death ==
Laycock died in Singapore on 3 December 1960 and was buried in Bidadari Cemetery. His gravestone was later moved to Bidadari Garden when the former was fully exhumed in 2006.
