= Froggatt Edge =

Climbing areas of England

Coordinates: 53.2845°N 1.6319°W

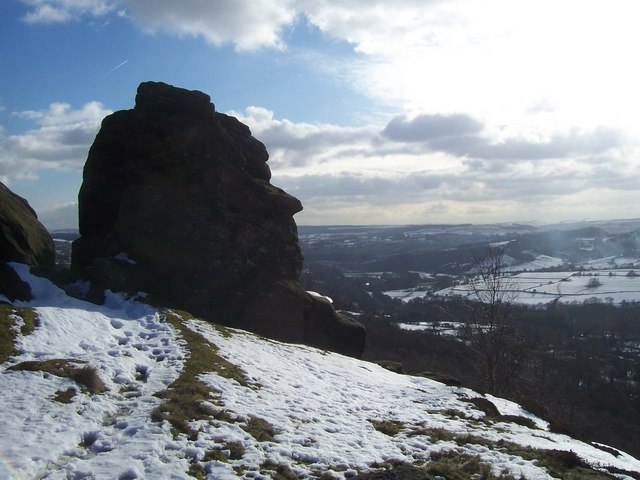
The Head in winter, and the view from Froggatt Edge

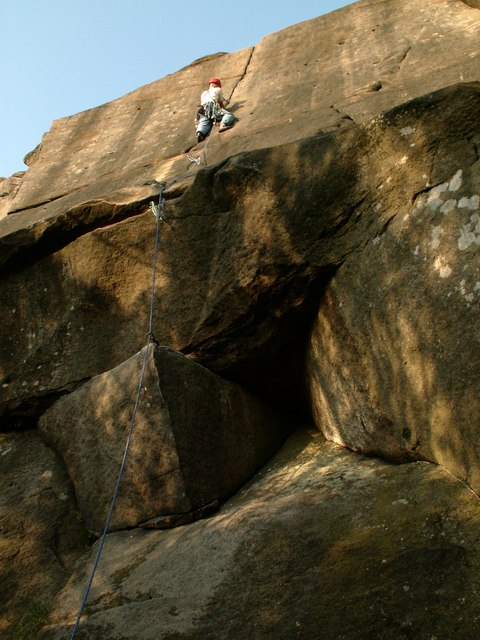
A climber on Tody's Wall

Froggatt Edge is a gritstone escarpment in the Dark Peak area of the Peak District National Park, in Derbyshire, England, close to the villages of Froggatt, Calver, Curbar, Baslow and Grindleford. The name Froggatt Edge applies only to the northernmost section of the escarpment; the middle and southernmost sections are called Curbar Edge and Baslow Edge respectively. The escarpment, like many in this area, is easily accessible from Sheffield.

== Characteristics ==
The escarpment forms the eastern rim of the valley of the River Derwent in this part of its course and, when viewed from the valley below, can be seen as rocky crags against the skyline. At the top of the escarpment is a managed heather moor, which is purple with bloom in late summer. Part of the moor management involves periodically burning sections to discourage reforestation and promote fresh heather shoots. Below the escarpment, on the valley slopes heading down towards the Derwent, is a forest of birch trees. The escarpment offers views across both moorland and valley. On the paths that run along both the top and bottom of the escarpment, the underlying gritstone is often exposed and subsequently worn by the passage of many feet, creating a warm-coloured sand that is characteristic of this part of the Peak District.

As with many of the gritstone edges in the Peak District, Froggatt was used as a source of millstones; a number of half-completed millstones can still be found at the bottom of this and other edges in Derbyshire.

== Walking and climbing ==
Froggatt Edge is frequented by rock climbers and hillwalkers throughout the year.

Joe Brown popularised two well-known classic routes in the late 1940s, Sunset Slab (HVS 4b) and Three Pebble Slab (HVS 5a). Whilst the climbing is not difficult, a fall from either climb (particularly Sunset Slab) would result in injuries. One of the best-known climbs at Froggatt Edge is "Downhill Racer", a smooth and near-vertical 17 m (50 ft) slab of gritstone. It was first climbed in 1977 by Pete Livesey and represented a breakthrough in that it combined difficulty with real danger: there is no suitable crack in the rock in which to place protection (to anchor a rope), so a climber who slips from the small finger holds will hit the ground. It is now graded E4 6a.

=== Climbing approaches ===
Froggatt Edge is considered the second most popular between the Eastern Edges. Due to its position the edge avoids the worst of the weather. Froggatt is famous for its slabs, but it also has a good amount of climbs including cracks. There are two usual approaches for climbing: the first one is from the parking on the B6045 located close to the Grouse Inn. 328 ft (100m) before the Froggatt Pinnacle is located the first section of the edge. There are a total of 472 climbs, the type of rock is gritstone, the edge is facing west and the altitude is 862 ft (263m). The beginning of the most common approach is located 1640.42 ft (500m) south of the Grouse Inn at White Gate.

The second approach is from a small lay-by below the Chequer Inn.
