= Gardom's Edge =

Gritstone edge near Baslow, Derbyshire, England

Coordinates: 53.2551°N 1.5949°W

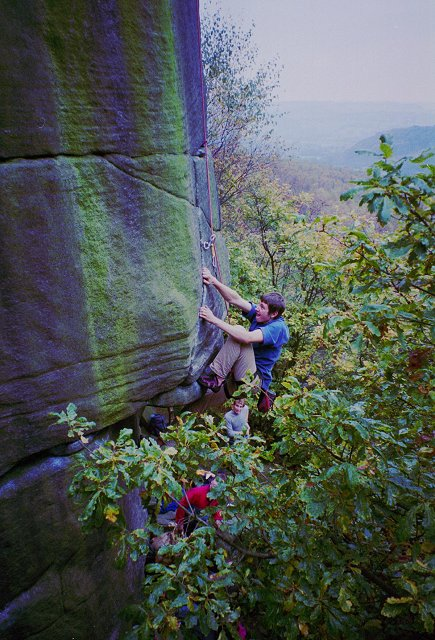
Green streaks are algae growing in a streak of water seepage.

Gardom's Edge is a rocky outcrop near Baslow in Derbyshire, England.

The shelf between Gardom's Edge and Birchen Edge is now moorland used for grazing sheep, but was once inhabited and used for arable farming during the Bronze Age. The area of the settlement is designated as a scheduled monument.

== Cup and ring stone ==
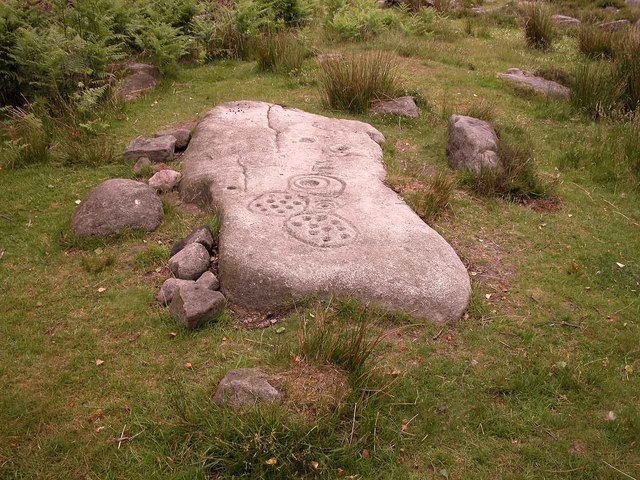
A replica of the cup and ring stone in situ at Gardom's Edge

The area's best-known archaeological feature is the cup-and-ring-marked stone (petroglyph) located at Ordnance Survey grid reference SK273730. The carved stone was discovered in the 1940s and has subsequently been buried under a replica to protect it from weathering and other damage. Another replica is on display in the Weston Park Museum.

The area was excavated by archaeologists from the Peak District National Park Authority and the University of Sheffield in 1998 and 1999.

== Seasonal sundial stone ==
In March 2012, Daniel Brown et al. postulated that a standing stone at Gardom's Edge could be a gnomon of a seasonal sundial (indicating the change of season, as through the winter half of the year its north-facing side is in permanent shadow) possibly dated to during the late Neolithic and early Bronze Age period (2500–1500 BC).
