= Gritstone =

Hard, coarse-grained, siliceous sandstone

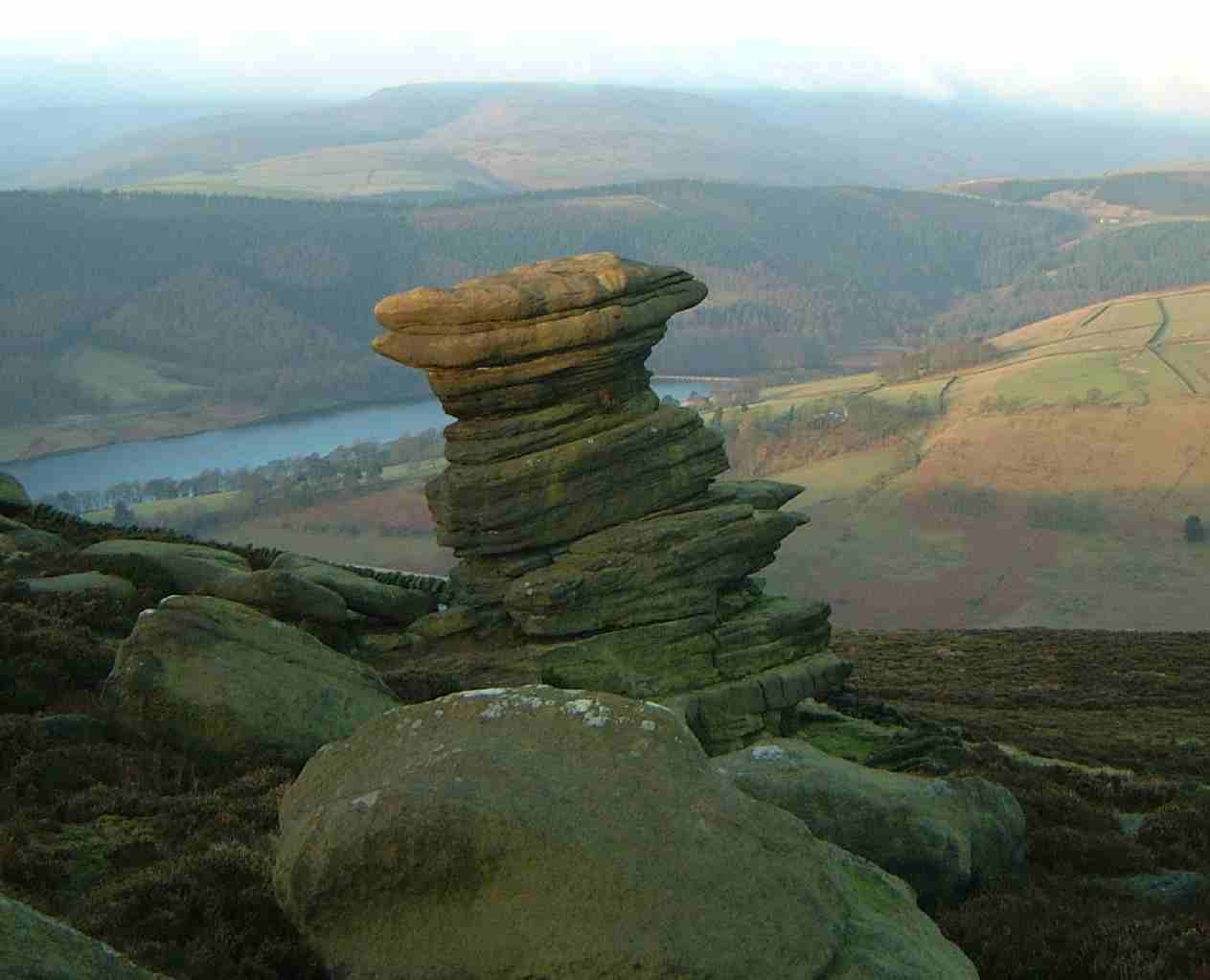
The Salt Cellar, a gritstone tor on Derwent Edge in the Peak District, England

Gritstone or grit is a hard, coarse-grained, siliceous sandstone. This term is especially applied to such sandstones that are quarried for building material. British gritstone was used for millstones to mill flour, to grind wood into pulp for paper and for grindstones to sharpen blades. "Grit" is often applied to sandstones composed of angular sand grains. It may commonly contain small pebbles.

"Millstone Grit" is an informal term for a succession of gritstones which are to be found in the Pennines (including the Peak District) of northern England. These sediments were laid down in the late (upper) Paleozoic era, in the Carboniferous period, in deltaic conditions. The Millstone Grit Group is a formal stratigraphic term for this sequence of rocks.

The gritstone edges of the Peak District are an important climbing area and the rock is much relished by English climbers, among whom it has almost cult status and is often referred to as "God's own rock". The rough surface provides outstanding friction, enabling climbers to stand on or grip the subtlest of features in the rock.
