= Steve McClure (climber) =

British rock climber

Personal information
- Nickname: Strong Steve
- Nationality: British
- Born: 25 July 1970 (age 56) Saltburn-by-the-Sea, North Riding of Yorkshire
- Education: Sacred Heart, Redcar Sheffield University
- Height: 169 cm (5 ft 7 in)
- Weight: 57 kg (126 lb)
- Website: www.steve-mcclure.com

Climbing career
- Type of climber: Sport climbing; Traditional climbing
- Highest grade: Redpoint: 9b (5.15b) sport; E11 7a traditional; Onsight/Flash: 8b+ (5.14a) sport; E8 6c traditional
- First ascents: Rainman (9b); Overshadow (9a+); Rainshadow (9a); Northern Lights (9a); Mutation (9a); GreatNess Wall (E10 7a)
- Major ascents: Rainman (9b); Rhapsody (E11 7a, 5.14b R/X) (2nd ascent)
- Retired from competition: 2004
- Known for: Creating hardest British sport climbs; repeating hardest British traditional climbs
- Updated on 13 January 2022

Steve McClure (born 25 July 1970) is a British rock climber and climbing author, who is widely regarded as Britain's leading and most important sport climber for a period that extends for over two decades, starting from the late 1990s. In 2017, he created Rainman, Britain's first-ever 9b (5.15b) sport route, and by that stage was responsible for developing the majority of routes graded 9a (5.14d) and above in Britain. Although mainly known for sport climbing, McClure has also been one of the most successful British traditional climbers, and British onsight climbers (in both sport climbing and traditional climbing formats).

== Climbing career ==
McClure started climbing early as both parents were keen climbers, and by age 16 was onsighting E6. McClure did not take up British sport climbing until he was 24, and said that it took him time to adapt saying, "[in sport] it's possible to commit 100%, rather than considering the risk and the danger [in traditional]". He went from onsighting E6 to onsighting 7b (5.12b); within one year was doing 8b (5.13d) redpoints in a day; within 2 years he was doing 8c (5.14b); within 4 years, at age 28, he was doing 9a (5.14d). As a late-comer to sport climbing, McClure had mixed form in competitions, retiring in 2004.

For the next two decades, McClure dominated British sport climbing, repeating the hardest routes of his predecessors such as Ben Moon's Hubble (8c+/9a), and Jerry Moffatt's Evolution (8c+), and developing Britain's first 9a routes. In 1998, he created Mutation, at the time Britain's second 9a (5.14d); (Note: The first British 9a was considered to be Neil Carson's 1996 route, The Big Bang at Lower Pen Trwyn, Wales.) but on its first repeat 23 years later was regraded to 9a+ (5.15a), Britain's first 9a+. (Note: The first British 9a+ was considered to be John Gaskin's 2004 route, Violent New Breed, a short-semi bouldering route at Giggleswick in North Yorkshire.) In 2000, he freed Britain's third 9a (5.14d), Ben Moon's Northern Lights. In 2007, McClure created Britain's second 9a+ (5.15a) route, Overshadow. In June 2017, aged 46, McClure completed long-term project Rainman, Britain's first-ever 9b (5.15b), with PlanetMountain saying: "Steve McClure is the climber who almost single-handedly has dictated the pace of cutting-edge sport climbing in the UK. Practically all the hardest climbs in the country are his, starting in 1998 with his 9a Mutation at Ravens Tor".

While McClure is best known for sport climbing, he is one of the few who have repeated the hardest traditional climbing routes in Britain, including Dave MacLeod's Rhapsody (E11 7a, 5.14c R/X) in 2008, and Neil Gresham's Lexicon (E11 7a, 5.14a R) in 2021. He has also freed projects such as GreatNess Wall (E10 7a), in 2019. On traditional climbing risk, he had said: "Routes like Harder Faster, Indian Face, The Bells The Bells and Meshuga just fill me with dread, and I have absolutely no drive to do them at all.", and, " I like the technical challenge of placing gear, but I'm not interested in death routes".

McClure is also known for onsighting routes, and in 2002, became the first British climber to onsight an 8b+ (5.14a) with Indian Summer at Kilnsey (he has since onsighted more routes at 8b+, such as Tom et je Ris, in Verdon in 2013). In 2009, he was unlucky not to become the first British climber to onsight an 8c (5.14b) failing at the final move of Amistad in Rodellar, Spain. In 2019, McClure made the first onsight of Nightmayer (E8 6c), one of the hardest onsights of a traditional climb in Britain, (Note: The hardest onsight of a traditional climbing route in Britain was considered to be James Pearson's 2014's ascent of Something's Burning (E9 7a) at Pembroke.) and in 2021, he flashed Impact Day (E8 6c). McClure's first British onsight of Ron Fawcett's Strawberries (E7 6b) in 2014, was also notable.

In 2013, McClure became the first-ever British nominee for a Salewa Rock Award at the 2013 Arco Rock Legends, and a citation calling him: "a true legend of this sport and his nomination rewards a lifetime of cutting-edge climbing"; the four nominees were Steve McClure, Chris Sharma, Alex Megos, and Adam Ondra (who won).

== Notable ascents ==
=== Sport climbing routes ===
- 1996: Evolution 8c+ (5.14c), Raven Tor. Fourth ascent of Jerry Moffatt's 1995 test piece, which is still a coveted route.
- 1998: Mutation 9a (5.14d), Raven Tor. First ascent. The second-ever 9a route in Britain. Only repeated 23-years later by Will Bosi, despite attempts by Alex Megos and Chris Sharma, who suggested a grade of "at least" 9a+ (5.15a), which would make it the world's second-ever 9a+.
- 2000: Northern Lights 9a (5.14d), Kilnsey. First ascent. The 3rd 9a in Britain, and repeated by Adam Ondra (2010), and Alex Megos (2016).
- 2002: Indian Summer 8b+ (5.14a), Kilnsey. First British onsight of an 8b+ sport climb.
- 2003: Rainshadow 9a (5.14d), Malham Cove. First ascent. Has become one of the most well-regarded and coveted 9a routes in Britain.
- 2007: Overshadow 9a+ (5.15a), Malham Cove. First ascent. The second 9a+ in Britain; in 2011, Adam Ondra repeated it as a "hard 9a+".
- 2008: North Star 9a (5.14d), Kilnsey. First ascent (an extension of Northern Exposure), and repeated by Adam Ondra in 2010 who confirmed grade.
- 2009: Stevolution 9a (5.14d), Raven Tor. First ascent.
- 2009: Hubble 8c+/9a , Raven Tor. Circa fifth ascent of Ben Moon's 1990 watershed route in British sport climbing; now considered closer to 9a.
- 2013: Batman 9a (5.14d), Malham Cove. First ascent, links up with Bat Route 8c (5.14b).
- 2017: Rainman 9b (5.15b), Malham Cove. First ascent; links Raindogs 8a (5.13b) to Rainshadow 9a (5.14d), to finish directly. Rainman is now considered to be the first-ever 9b route in Britain.

=== Traditional climbing routes ===
- 2004: Elder Statesman (HXS 7a, 5.14), Curbar Edge, Peak District. First ascent; McClure used three ropes for protection due the danger of cutting a rope on the sharp arete in a fall; featured in the films Hard Grit and The Elder Statesman.
- 2008: Rhapsody (E11 7a, 5.14c R/X), Dumbarton Rock. First repeat of Dave MacLeod's 2006 route; one of the world's hardest traditional routes.
- 2011: The Quarryman (E8 7a), Twll Mawr, Dinorwic quarry, Llanberis. First one-day ascent of all 4-pitches of Johnny Dawes's 1986 slate test-piece.
- 2014: Strawberries (E7 6b), Tremadog. North Wales. First British onsight of the classic Ron Fawcett route.
- 2015: Choronzon (E10 7a), East Range, Pembrokeshire. 2nd ascent after Neil Mawson's FFA in 2014.
- 2015: Muy Caliente! (E9/10 6c), Stennis Ford, Pembrokeshire. 6th ascent after Tim Emmett's FFA in 2010.
- 2019: Nightmayer (E8 6c). Dinas Cromlech. First onsight and 4th ascent of Steve Mayer's 1990s route.
- 2019: GreatNess Wall (E10 7a), Nesscliffe. First ascent of a project that had been tried unsuccessfully by several parties.
- 2021: Impact Day (E8 6c). Pavey Ark, Lake District. First onsight flash and 2nd ascent of Dave Birkett's 1999 FFA.
- 2021: Lexicon (E11 7a, 5.14a R), Pavey Ark, Lake District. 2nd ascent a few weeks after Neil Gresham's FFA; McClure took a 70-foot fall.

== Bibliography ==
- Beyond Limits: A life through climbing (Steve McClure), November 2014. ISBN 978-1910240199.
- Sport Climbing+: The Positive Approach to Improve Your Climbing (Steve McClure, Adrian Berry), December 2006. ISBN 978-1873341865.

== Filmography ==
- Documentary on McClure: Patterson, Richie (director) (2018). How Steve McClure Became Britain's Best Sport Climber (Motion picture). RoccaVerde.
- Documentary on freeing Overshadow: Richard Heap, Ben Pritchard (director) (2007). Steve McClure 9a+ (Episode 2, HardXS Series) (Motion picture). SlackJaw Films.

== See also ==
- History of rock climbing
- List of first ascents (sport climbing)
