= Bamford Edge =

Tourist attractions in Derbyshire

Coordinates: 53.36148°N 1.69192°W

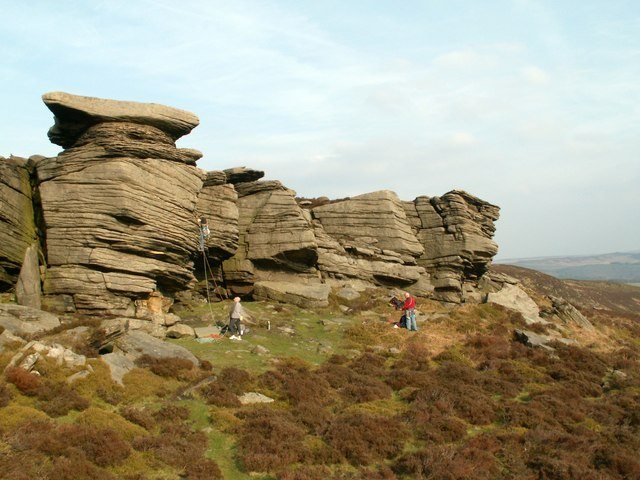
- Climbers on Gun Buttress, Bamford Edge

- Location within Derbyshire
- Location: Peak District, United Kingdom
- Nearest city: Sheffield
- Range: Pennines
- Type of climbing: Traditional crag
- Height range: 8 metres (26 ft) to 13 metres (43 ft)
- Technical grades: D to E7
- Quantity of routes: 150 routes
- Cliff aspect: South-west
- Elevation: 400 metres (1,300 ft)
- Ownership: Private
- Access: All year (except pre-announced closures)

Bamford Edge is an overhang of gritstone rock that sticks out north of the village of Bamford, Hope Valley, in the English county of Derbyshire. The first ascent of "Smoked Salmon", which is graded as E8 7b was made by British climber Johnny Dawes.

Bamford Edge has numerous trails across it and, on a clear day, provides views of almost all of the Hope Valley. Some trails come out at New Road opposite the Yorkshire Bridge public house.
