= Rachel Pearce =

British rock climber

Rachel Pearse
Personal information
- Born: 1994 (age 31–32) Harlech, Wales
- Occupation: Rock climber

Climbing career
- Type of climber: Traditional climbing; Bouldering; Sport climbing
- Highest grade: Redpoint: 8b+ (5.14a); Onsight/Flash: 8a (5.13b); Bouldering: 7C (V9)
- Known for: First-ever female ascent of Indian Face
- Updated on 22 August 2026

Rachel Elin Pearce (born 1994) is a British female rock climber from Harlech in Wales who came to wider prominence for her repeats and first female free ascents (FFFAs) of major British traditional climbing routes that rank amongst some of the hardest in the world.

In June 2023, Pearce made the second female free ascent of the extreme traditional climbing route, Nightmayer (E8 6c), in Dinas Cromlech in Wales, and in September 2024 she made the third female ascent of Olwen (E9 6c), in Rhoscolyn in Wales. In August 2026, she made the first female free ascent of the famous traditional route, Indian Face (E9 6c), once considered the hardest traditional climbing route in the world, and a route that is still rarely repeated because of its high degree of danger and risk of groundfall.

== See also ==
- Hazel Findlay, British traditional rock climber
- Emma Twyford, British traditional rock climber
