= Indian Face =

Traditional climbing route in Wales

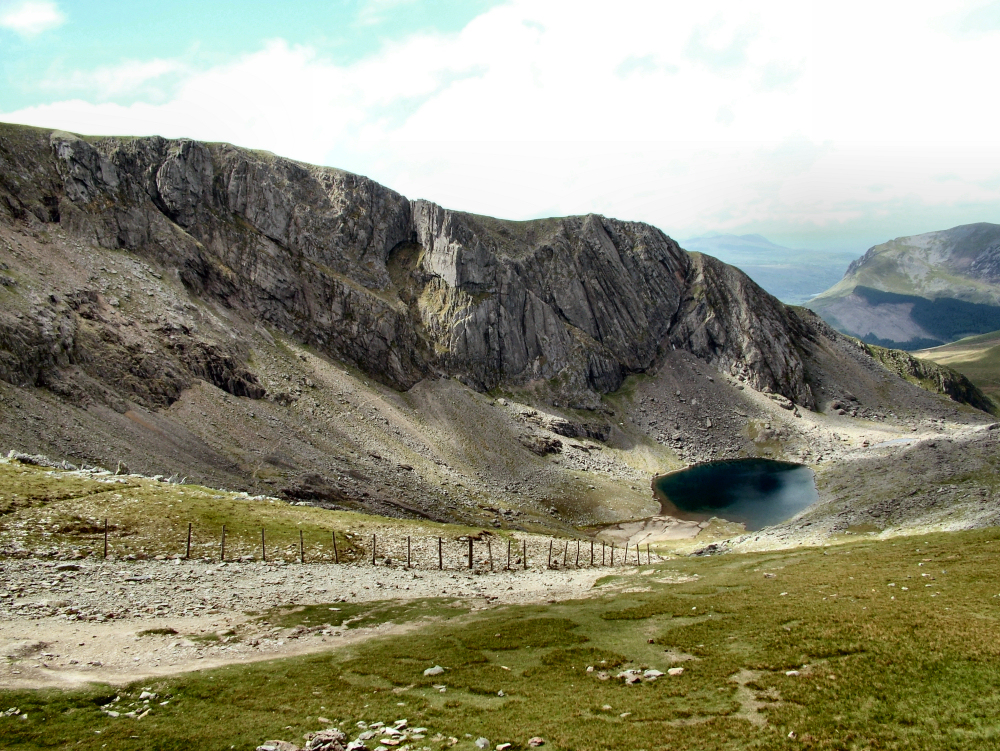
- Crag of Clogwyn Du'r Arddu, Snowdon, Wales

- Location within England
- Location: Snowdon, Wales
- Coordinates: 53.0792°N 4.0939°W
- Climbing area: Clogwyn Du'r Arddu
- Route type: Traditional climbing; Slab climbing
- Rock type: Rhyolite
- Vertical gain: 45 metres (148 ft)
- Pitches: 1
- Technical grade: E9 6c (British); 5.13a X (American)
- First free ascent: Johnny Dawes; 4 October 1986 (Note: The exact date is per the official guidebook to Clogwyn Du'r Arddu, and also used by the British Mountaineering Council.)
- First female free ascent: Rachel Pearce; 16 August 2026
- Known for: Hardest traditional-climbing route; first E9 in history

Indian Face is a 45-metre (148 ft) traditional climbing route on the rhyolite "Great Wall" of the East Buttress of Clogwyn Du'r Arddu, in Wales. When English climber Johnny Dawes completed the first free ascent of the route on 4 October 1986, it was graded E9 6c or (5.13a X), the first-ever E9-graded route, and was considered one of the hardest traditional-climbing routes in the world.

Indian Face is still considered one of the world's most intimidating traditional climbs, and even decades after its first ascent, it is rarely repeated. The ascent was an historic moment in the transition from traditional climbing as the dominant form of extreme rock climbing (in Britain, and elsewhere), to the safer form of sport climbing, which became the focus for the leading climbers.

== History ==
Clogwyn Du'r Arddu has long been considered a "crucible" of British traditional climbing, with many of Britain's leading climbers creating notable routes on its buttresses. The most challenging section is the sheer and imposing slab of the "Great Wall" on the East Buttress.

In 1980, enigmatic British climber and artist John Redhead—who freed Britain's first-ever E7-graded route, The Bells The Bells (E7 6c)—attempted to onsight a new route on the blanker right-hand side of "Great Wall". After serious and nearly fatal falls, he abseiled down to drill a bolt at his high point of 80 feet (24 m); he called this route Tormented Ejaculation and left it ungraded.

In 1983, British climber Jerry Moffatt chopped the bolt while abseiling; he then climbed past it but avoided the blanker groove to the left (what would later become Indian Face), veering right to create Master's Wall, (Note: Moffatt called his route "Master's Wall" in honour of the British climbing pioneer Joe Brown, after whom that part of Cloggy's East Buttress was nicknamed.) which he graded E7 6b. (Note: In 2018, James 'Caff' McHaffie repeated Master's Wall (the second person to do so after Leo Houlding in 1996) and said of it: "'I'd done more than 200 routes of E7-9 [including Indian Face in 2013] and this bastard felt amongst the most serious few leads I'd ever done" and "From reading into Jerry's account of his ascent I'm pretty sure this is where he went and I'll just throw it out there and say I think he did an E9 in 1983". Later in 2021, McHaffie said that he felt that Moffatt's route was "massively under-graded".) Moffatt found the climb terrifying, later saying: "At that time to be respected, you really had to be putting up really scary new routes. That was where it was at, in Britain at least. Master's Wall is probably where I risked most."

In 1984, Redhead repeated Master's Wall and told the authors of Welsh Rock (1986) that he felt Tormented Ejaculation was the crux of Master's Wall and "... the placement of the bolt was solely to protect moves leftwards into the finest unclimbed groove on the Great Wall [Indian Face] and NOT to go right [Master's Wall] which was merely an escape". In 1984, Redhead freed Margins of the Mind (E8 6c), further left of Master's Wall, which is considered the second-ever E8-grade in Britain after Dave Cuthbertson's 1983 ascent of Requiem in Scotland.

On 4 October 1986, Johnny Dawes followed up the first half of Master's Wall, but before the (then removed) bolt of Tormented Ejaculation, he entered the lefthand groove to make the first free ascent of Indian Face, the first-ever E9-graded rock climb in Britain. Dawes's ascent of Indian Face was considered to be the hardest and most dangerous traditional route in the world, and his feat was reported by the wider non-climbing media. The 1989 guidebook described it as "a pitch of such appalling difficulty as to be almost beyond the realms of human comprehension". In 2011, Dawes said: "As you set off it's best to consider yourself already dead. You just do it".

Shortly after Dawes's ascent, a key flake of rock came loose while John Redhead was cleaning the route. Redhead presented the flake to Dawes, who refused it, and Redhead painted a picture of dueling climbers on the scarred rock that the broken flake had left behind. The event caused an uproar in British climbing; the painting was removed, and repairs were made to the rock face. Redhead was openly critical of the "headpointing" techniques employed by Dawes, Moffat, and other ascensionists, despite criticisms of his own placement of a bolt at Clogwyn.

Dawes's ascent, his rivalry with Redhead, and the repeats are the subject of documentaries, including E9 6c (1997), Johnny Dawes and the Story of Indian Face (2006), and Return to the Indian Face (2011).

On 16 August 2026, British climber Rachel Pearce made the first female free ascent telling Climbing magazine, "I think it's cool that a girl has done it now as well. I'm sure there's loads of women that are strong enough for the route, but probably not stupid enough, or want to do it that much".

== Legacy ==
Indian Face retains an intimidating reputation amongst climbers. In 2012, Climbing described it as "Indian Face, E9 6c, 150 feet of technical, 5.13a death". The 2013 North Wales Climbs guidebook touts Indian Face as "the route of the 1980s", adding, "Seven repeats in the quarter of a century since it was first climbed and no onsight ascent, despite routes with bigger E-grades receiving more attention, tells you all you need to know." In 2004, Nick Dixon said of his first repeat in 1994: "The upper wall is really hard, the gear now too far away, death real and looming, and it's too much to remember"; and Neil Gresham said of his second repeat, also in 1994: "For a split second of complete tranquility, I actually don't mind giving in. I resign myself to defeat and prepare for the unimaginable". In 2020, Britain's strongest climber, Steve McClure, who climbed Rhapsody (E11), said: "Routes like Harder Faster, Indian Face, The Bells The Bells and Meshuga just fill me with dread, and I have absolutely no drive to do them at all."

Indian Face marked the twilight of traditional climbing as the main focus for the best British climbers; many were moving to sport climbing, with pre-fixed bolts for climbing protection. Jerry Moffatt and climbing partner Ben Moon would abandon traditional climbing and set major new worldwide grade milestones in sport climbing, becoming two of the world's strongest climbers of the late 1980s to early 1990s. Dawes was unwilling to undertake the intensive plyometric training techniques (e.g. the campus board) that Moffatt and Moon adopted, but he would still free further notable traditional climbs, such as Gaia (E8 6c), End of the Affair (E8 6c) and The Quarryman (E8 7a). Climbers like Dave MacLeod would create even-harder traditional climbs, such as Rhapsody in 2006, the world's first E11, but the focus on traditional climbing had passed to sport climbing.

== Ascents ==
Indian Face has been ascended by:

- 1st. Johnny Dawes on 4 October 1986.
- 2nd. Nick Dixon in 1994.
- 3rd. Neil Gresham in 1994 (a few days after Nick Dixon).
- 4th. Dave MacLeod in 2010.
- 5th. James McHaffie in 2013.
- 6th. Calum Muskett in 2013 (same day).
- 7th. George Ullrich in 2013 (same day).
- 8th. Angus Kille in 2018.
- 9th. Morus Sanderson in 2023.
- 10th & 1st Female Free Ascent. Rachel Pearce on 16 August 2026.

== Filmography ==
- Short documentary on the rivalry between John Redhead and Johnny Dawes on the Indian Face: Dominic Clemence (director) (1997). E9 6c (Motion picture). BBC Productions.
- Documentary on Johnny Dawes' 1986 ascent of Indian Face: Alun Hughes (director), Jim Perrin (writer) (2006). Johnny Dawes & The story of Indian Face (Motion picture). Hughes Prod.
- Short documentary on Dave MacLeod's 2010 repeat of Indian Face: Paul Diffley (director) (2011). Return to Indian Face E9 (Motion picture). Hot Aches Prod.

== See also ==
- History of rock climbing
- Rhapsody (climb), British E11-graded traditional climbing route from 2006
- Master's Edge, E7 6c-graded traditional climbing route at Millstone Quarry, Peak District, England
