= Beth Rodden =

American rock climber (born 1980)

Personal information
- Born: April 5, 1980 (age 46) San Francisco, California, United States
- Occupation: Rock climber
- Website: www.bethrodden.com

Climbing career
- Type of climber: Traditional climbing; Sport climbing
- Highest grade: Redpoint: 5.14c (8c+); Onsight/Flash: 5.13a (7c+)

Beth Rodden (born April 5, 1980) is an American rock climber known for her ascents of hard single-pitch traditional climbing routes. She was the youngest woman to climb 5.14a (8b+) and is one of the only women in the world to have redpointed a 5.14c (8c+) traditional climbing graded climb. Rodden and fellow climber Tommy Caldwell were partners from 2000 to 2010, during which time they completed the second free ascent of The Nose. In 2008, Rodden made the first ascent of Meltdown, one of the hardest traditional climbs in the world and the first time in history that a female climber matched the peak of the highest climbing grades.

== Climbing career ==
Rodden started climbing in 1995 at The Rocknasium, a local climbing gym in Davis, California. She won the Junior National JCCA Championships in 1996, 1997, and 1998; ranked first overall in the ASCF adult national series in 1997 and 1998; and placed third at the ASCF Fall Nationals in 1998.

In 1998 Rodden redpointed the sport route To Bolt Or Not To Be, the historical first 5.14 established in America, and became the youngest woman to ascend 5.14a. Her work impressed free climbing pioneer Lynn Hill, who invited Rodden to make the first all-female ascent of Madagascar's Tsaranoro Massif in 1999. The trip to Madagascar marked Rodden's move to a less mainstream trad climbing career. In 2000, she put up the first free ascent of Lurking Fear with Tommy Caldwell, marking El Capitan's second first free ascent by a woman. With Lurking Fear and her 2005 free ascent of The Nose, she became the first woman to free climb two routes on El Capitan. In October 2005 she free-climbed The Optimist, becoming the first American woman to redpoint 5.14b. In 2006, Beth and then husband Tommy Caldwell, competed in the 2006 Triple Crown Bouldering Series to raise money for climber's access.

In February 2008, Rodden redpointed the first ascent of Meltdown, a thin sustained crack in Yosemite previously projected by Ron Kauk. A proposed grade of 5.14c made it the hardest pitch in Yosemite, and first ascent by a woman. Despite many talented climbers attempting it, it took 11 years for anyone to make a second ascent.

== Hostage in Kyrgyzstan ==
On a climbing trip to Kyrgyzstan's Kara Su Valley in August 2000, Rodden, then-boyfriend Tommy Caldwell, and fellow climbers Jason "Singer" Smith and photographer John Dickey were held hostage for six days by rebels from the Islamic Movement of Uzbekistan. The four climbers overpowered one of their captors and escaped to a Kyrgyz army camp. During their capture they were forced to hide around the valley as their captors avoided the military. At midnight on August 18, the commander left them all to search for batteries for the radio as well as food, leaving only one guard, Ravshan Sharipov, to watch the four captives. The ordeal finally ended when Tommy Caldwell pushed him off the edge of the cliff, although they learned later that Sharipov survived. About the decision to push Sharipov off, Beth stated: "It's so hard to think about that now, but we were afraid we wouldn't survive." Their story was a brief sensation in the American media.

The Kyrgyzstan incident is included in the 2017 film The Dawn Wall.

Rodden's climbing suffered and she did not travel internationally for a year. Then in October 2001 she climbed El Capitan in an Americares event to raise money for the families of 9/11 rescue personnel. She returned to the top tier of rock climbing, onsighting Phoenix, a 5.13a crack in Yosemite, in May 2002.

== Personal life ==
Rodden met Tommy Caldwell through competition in 1995 and they started dating shortly before Kyrgyzstan. They married in 2003, lived in Yosemite, and both worked establishing themselves as professional climbers. Rodden and Caldwell divorced in 2009.

In 2014, she had a son with husband Randy Puro.

Rodden has also said that she struggled with an eating disorder early on in her career, and she currently criticizes the perceived importance of weight in the sport.

== Notable ascents ==
- est.1997: Country Boy (5.13d, 2nd ascent) at Lumpy Ridge, Estes Park Valley, Colorado.
- 1998: To Bolt or Not to Be (5.14a, 8b+) in Smith Rock State Park, Oregon.
- 1999: Bravo les Filles (VI 5.13d A0, 13 pitches, with Lynn Hill, Nancy Feagin, and Kath Pyke) in Tsaranoro Massif, Madagascar.
- 1999/2000: Disco Machine Gun (5.13, FA/FFA) Indian Creek Canyon, Moab, Utah.
- 2000: Lurking Fear (5.10 A3, FFA with Tommy Caldwell) on El Capitan, Yosemite Valley. Originally rated 5.10 A3, the first seven pitches free are 5.12c, 5.13c, 5.12d, 5.12d, 5.12a, 5.12c, and 5.13c.
- 2002: The Phoenix (5.13a, first female onsight) Upper Cascade Falls, Yosemite Valley, California.
- 2002: Grand Illusion (5.13c, onsight, first female ascent) at Sugarloaf, California.
- 2003: Sarchasm (5.14a, 8b+, 2nd ascent) Longs Peak, Rocky Mountain National Park, Colorado.
- 2003: West Buttress (5.13c, FFA with Tommy Caldwell) on El Capitan, Yosemite Valley. All pitches were redpointed at different times; no continuous free ascent done yet.
- 2005: Anaconda (5.13b/c, first female free ascent) at Lumpy Ridge, Rocky Mountain National Park, Colorado.
- 2005: Grand Wall (5.13b, Free Ascent) multi-pitch at Squamish, B.C. Canada.
- 2005: The Optimist (5.14b, FA/FFA) in Smith Rock State Park, Oregon.
- 2005: The Nose (VI 5.14a, 3rd/4th Free Ascent with Tommy Caldwell) on El Capitan, Yosemite Valley, California. In October Caldwell and Rodden each led about half of the route’s 31 pitches and freed every one.
- 2008: Meltdown (ungraded, thought 5.14c, FA), Upper Cascade Falls, Yosemite Valley, California. She worked the 70-foot crack for most of the winter before redpointing, placing all protection on the redpoint ascent.

== Filmography ==
- 2000: A Day in the Life (Integrity 7)
- 2000: Madagascar - A Woman's First Ascent (American Adventure Productions)
- 2000: The Video Guide to Aid Climbing (Green Gear Productions)
- 2003: Lotus Flower (Petzl)
- 2004: Hostage Mountain (Sequoia Entertainment/GRB Inc.)
- 2005: Dosage Volume III (bigUP productions) - Rodden on The Optimist.
- 2005: A Day In The Life: 5 Women Who Climb (Vasentertainment)
- 2006: Wall Rats (Form Follows Function/Yegg Central Productions)
- 2006: The First Couple of Rock (Corey Rich and Jason Paur) - A film highlighting Rodden and Tommy Caldwell as married climbing partners.
- 2006: Dosage Volume IV (bigUP Productions)
- 2008: Dosage Volume V (bigUP Productions) - Rodden on several hard traditional routes including Meltdown.
- 2008: Grand Canyon Walls (bigUP Productions/Sender Films) - Rodden and Tommy Caldwell raft down the Grand Canyon looking for first ascents.
- 2013: The Secret is Out - Jailhouse (Duct Tape Then Beer/The Access Fund)
- 2013: Rumbling Bald (Duct Tape Then Beer/The Access Fund)
- 2017: Above the Fray (Bedrock Film Works)
- 2018: The Dawn Wall (Red Bull Media House/Sender Films)
- 2020: Yosemite: America's Treasure
- 2022: Reel Rock 16 - Showcase 2 - This Is Beth (A Well Travelled Collective Productions/In partnership with Reel Rock) - Beth Rodden reflects on a legendary climbing career and the challenges of self-talk and body image.

== See also ==
- History of rock climbing
- List of first ascents (sport climbing)
- Dave MacLeod, Scottish traditional climber
- Sonnie Trotter, Canadian traditional climber
