= Rhapsody (climb) =

Traditional climbing route in Dumbarton, Scotland

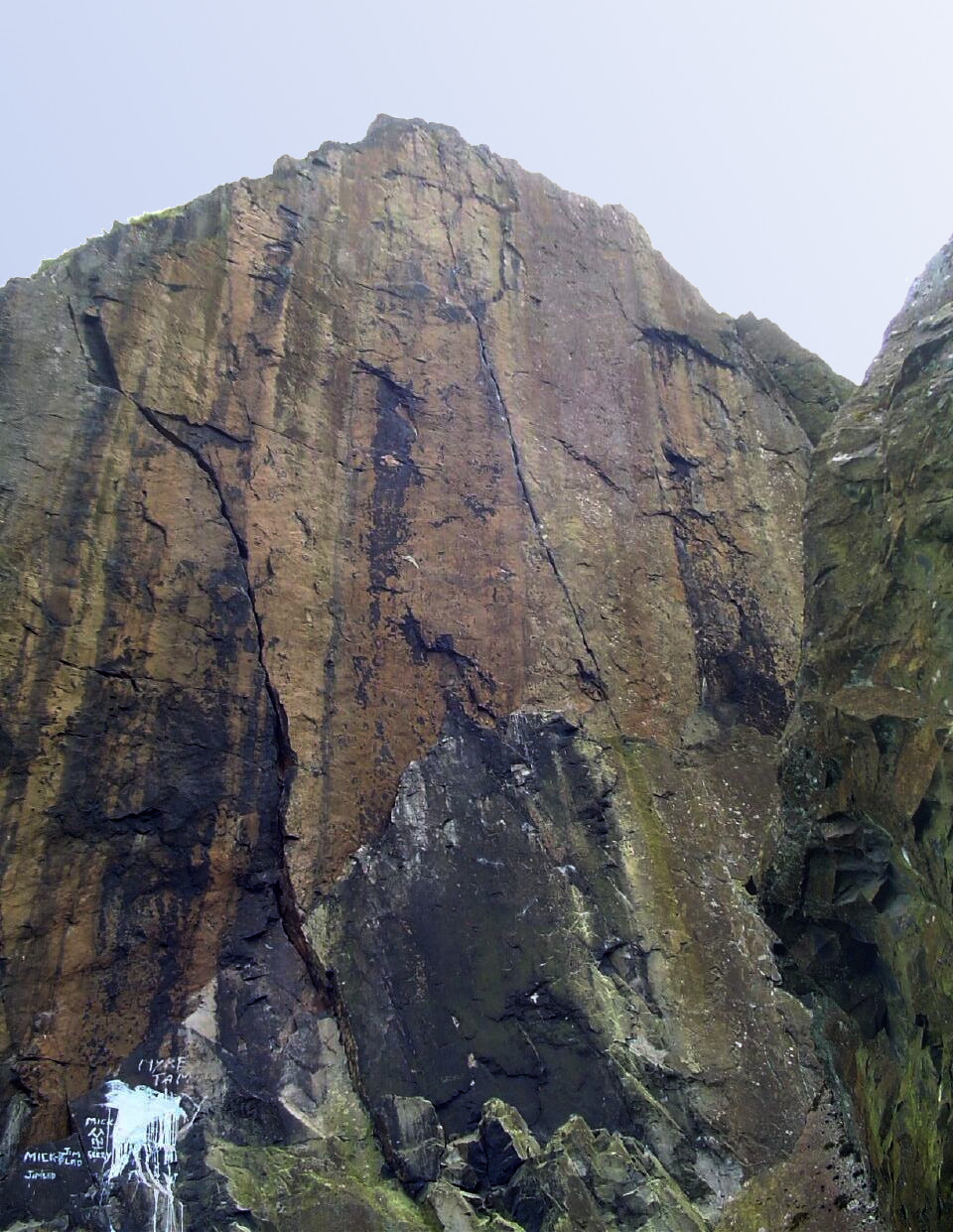
- The northwest face of Dumbarton Rock. Rhapsody and Requiem follow the thin diagonal crack in the middle of the face; Requiem veers to a new crack on the right when the crack begins to disappear.

- Location within Scotland
- Location: Dumbarton Rock, Scotland
- Coordinates: 55°56′14″N 4°33′54″W
- Climbing area: Dumbarton Rock
- Route type: Traditional climbing; Crack climbing
- Rock type: Basalt
- Vertical gain: 35 m (115 ft)
- Pitches: 1
- Technical grade: Rhapsody: E11 5.14c (8c+) R/X; Requiem: E8 5.13b (8a) R
- First free ascent: Rhapsody: Dave MacLeod; 9 April 2006; Requiem: Dave Cuthbertson; 6 July 1983
- First female free ascent: Rhapsody: Lara Neumeier; 7 October 2026; Requiem: Caroline Ciavaldini; 27 September 2014
- Known for: First-ever traditional 5.14c (8c+) graded route in history; First E11 graded route in history

Rhapsody is a 35-metre (115 ft) long traditional climbing route up a thin crack on a slightly overhanging vertical basalt rock face on Dumbarton Rock, in Scotland. When Scottish climber Dave MacLeod made the first free ascent in 2006, it became Britain's first-ever E11-graded route, and at the grade of 5.14c (8c+), Rhapsody was the world's hardest traditional route. It set a grade milestone in traditional climbing that stood for over a decade until the ascent of Tribe at grade E11-12 5.14d (9a) in 2019 and of Bon Voyage at grade E12 5.14d (9a) in 2024.

Rhapsody shares the same central crack-line as another notable traditional climbing route called Requiem (the two routes deviate for the last 10 metres near the top as the crack-line peters out). Scottish climber Dave Cuthbertson made the first free ascent of Requiem in 1983, creating Britain's first-ever E8-graded route. With subsequent ascents, the consensus grade settled at E8 6b or 5.13b (8a), and Requiem is now recognized as being one of the world's hardest rock climbing routes—of any format (i.e. traditional or sport climbing)—at the time it was first ascended in 1983.

== History ==
In 1983, Scottish climber Dave "Cubby" Cuthbertson free climbed the central crack on the northwest face of Dumbarton Rock and called it Requiem. It was speculated at the time that the technical grade could be British 7a—that is international 5.13c (8a+)—and which would have been a new grade milestone in rock climbing after Tony Yaniro's 1979 ascent of Grand Illusion at 5.13b (8a). With subsequent repeats, the consensus grade of Requiem settled at E8 6b, or circa 5.13b (8a), making it the first-ever British E8-graded route. It means that at the time of Cuthbertson's ascent, Requiem was one of the hardest climbing routes in the world of any type, as it was only in 1983 that Jerry Moffatt set a new grade milestone with The Face 5.13c (8a+), and in 1984 that Wolfgang Güllich set another milestone with Kanal im Rücken 5.13d (8b).

In 2006, Scottish climber Dave MacLeod completed a 2-year project to continue Requiem's thinning central crack to the top, creating Rhapsody. MacLeod's route featured a large runout, and he took several 'bone crushing' 20-metre (66 ft) falls from its crux at the top onto tiny wire nuts for protection. Rhapsody was the first-ever British E11-graded climbing route, and at the international grades of 5.14c (8c+), was a new grade milestone in traditional climbing making it the "world's hardest 'traditional' climb". In 2008, Canadian climber Sonnie Trotter made the first repeat of Rhapsody and added a variation between it and Requiem called Direqium that he graded 5.14a (8b+). A few weeks after Trotter, British climber Steve McClure made the third repeat.

In 2014, British climber James Pearson made the fourth ascent of Rhapsody. Pearson had caused controversy in 2008 when he dismissed MacLeod's proposed grading despite not being able to complete the route. MacLeod had in turn repeated Pearson's Walk of Life, which he had proposed at E12 7a, but which MacLeod downgraded to E9 6c. After the controversy, Pearson left for France, but his wife, French climber Caroline Ciavaldini, urged Pearson to return to Rhapsody. Pearson said of his ascent: "I couldn't take it back, but perhaps I could do something to make up for it? A gesture of goodwill, or perhaps even a peace offering to the UK climbing community?". Just after his ascent, Ciavaldini made the first female free ascent (FFFA) of Requiem.

In 2016, Italian traditional climber Jacopo Larcher made the fifth repeat of Rhapsody, while his partner Barbara Zangerl made the second female ascent of Requiem, and the first repeat—and first female ascent—of Dave MacLeod's 2001 Dumbarton route, Achemine at E9 6c.

While in the years after MacLeod's first ascent, other traditional climbing routes were established at Rhapsody's climbing grade milestone of 8c+ (5.14c) (e.g. Beth Rodden's Meltdown in Yosemite), Rhapsody's grade milestone in traditional climbing was only surpassed with the 2019 ascent of Tribe by Jacopo Larcher, which is considered to be at 9a (5.14d), and at the British E-grade of E11 to E12, and also with the 2024 ascent of Bon Voyage by James Pearson, which was also considered to be at 9a (5.14d), and most likely at the British E-grade of E12.

On 7 October 2026, German climber Lara Neumeier made the FFFA of Rhapsody.

== Route ==
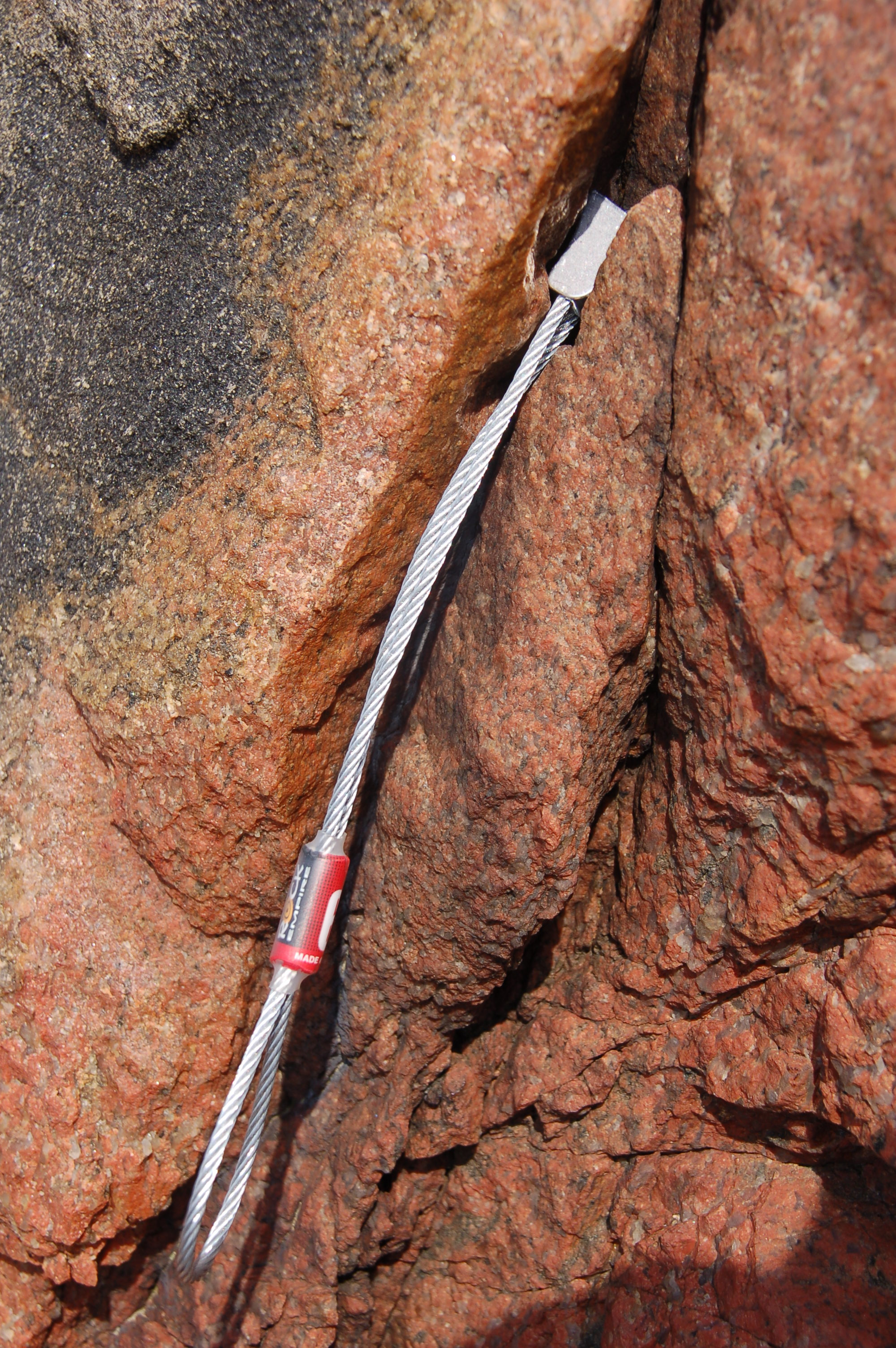
The 10-metre (33 ft) runout on section 3, is typically secured by a tiny Black Diamond No #3 nut inserted near the top of section 2.

Rhapsody and Requiem are essentially crack climbs with bouldering cruxes close to their very tops; they both break into three parts, the first two of which they share. The first section is an easier circa 7a (5.11d) graded (depending on the specific route taken up the slab) (Note: In a 2024 interview with Magnus Midtbo for Midtbo's climbing video channel, MacLeod said that the grade of the slab was about 7a [first section], the central crack [second section] was about 7c, the move into Rhapsody [third section] was about 8b, and the final bouldering problem at the top [third section] was Font 8A; he graded the overall route at E11 or french 8c+ if it was a bolted sport climbing route.) 10-metre (33 ft) slab that gets to a ledge that is shared by several routes on the face. The second part is a 15-metre (49 ft) narrow left-leaning diagonal 5.12d (7c) graded crack up the centre of the face that both Requiem and Rhapsody follow. The climbing protection is considered to be thin (e.g. the crack only takes the smallest wire nuts such as BD#3) but with solid placements, which is important given the potential falls to come.

The final section starts from a resting jug 10 metres (33 ft) from the top where the crack starts to peter out. From here, Requiem moves directly right to another crack system that leads directly to the top. Rhapsody moves directly left on delicate 8b (5.13d) holds before following the diminishing line of the original crack via a 14-move V11 (8A) bouldering problem near the top. There is no additional climbing protection available in the third section, and with the hardest moves at the very top, any fall will be a 'swinging fall' (i.e. because the climber has moved horizontally from the second section) of up to 20–25 metres (66–82 ft) in length. Several climbers reported falls from the top where they bounced off the slab of the first section.

Sonnie Trotter wrote that Rhapsody felt like an eliminate, and that there was a more direct line between Rhapsody and Requiem that he called Direquiem that he graded at 5.14a (8b+), and which he felt was a more natural finish to the crack. Trotter noted that a climber on the final stages of Rhapsody had to deliberately keep themselves from reaching out to grab the arete that was on their left side, which Trotter dubbed The Cop Out, and even graded it at 5.13b/c (or 8a/a+). Trotter also avoided anchoring his belayer to the ground (i.e. when Trotter fell, it lifted his belayer into the air), which reduced the 'swing' on his falls and stopped him from crashing into the rock face as MacLeod had painfully endured.

== Legacy ==
Rhapsody retains an intimidating reputation, that started with MacLeod's 2006 announcement of his ascent where he said that he had taken nine 20-metre (66 ft) falls from the crux that was only held by "RP nuts", (Note: RP nuts are the smallest climbing nuts sold) and that: "I injured myself badly on some of my failed attempts. As far as I know, there aren't other traditional routes around with this combination of danger and high difficulty". In April 2024, Norwegian climber Magnus Midtbo visited Dumbarton for his social media channel to try Rhapsody on a top rope, belayed by Dave MacLeod, and called it "possibly the most dangerous route in the world", noting the distance of the falls from the crux that needed to be held by tiny protective wire nuts.

Requiem and Rhapsody put Dunbarton Rock into rock climbing history, with two routes that at the time of their first free ascent, were the hardest traditional climbs in the world. MacLeod's ascent of Rhapsody received media attention outside of the world of traditional climbing and was part of a resurgence in interest in traditional climbing as new "trad grade milestones" were being established such as Trotter's Cobra Crack. When Jacopo Larcher made the 5th ascent he said of seeing E11, the film of MacLeod making the first ascent: "I remember at that time it seemed completely crazy, absolutely incomprehensible... For me it was something unimaginable. I never thought that one day I’d go an try it. Let alone repeat it!".

== Ascents ==
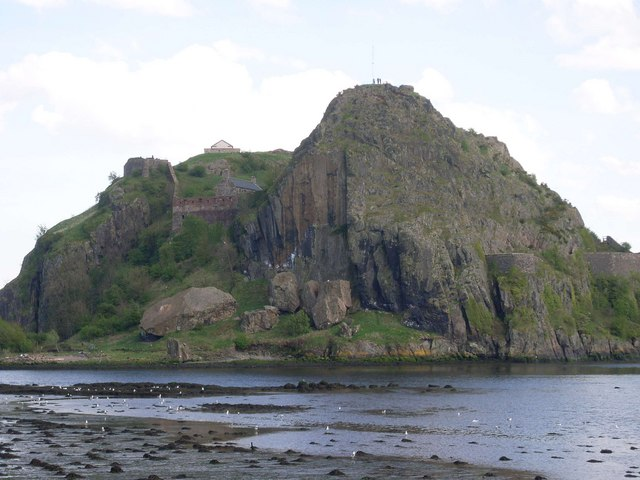
Dumbarton Rock, with the northwest face in the centre

Notable ascents of Rhapsody:

- 1st. Dave MacLeod on 9 April 2006.
- 2nd. Sonnie Trotter in June 2008.
- 3rd. Steve McClure in June 2008.
- 4th. James Pearson in September 2014.
- 5th. Jacopo Larcher in May 2016.
- 6th. Gérôme Pouvreau in September 2018.
- 7th. Mathew Wright in April 2024.
- 8th. Billy Ridal in June 2025.
- 9th. Buster Martin on 1 October 2026.
- 10th and 1st Female Free Ascent. Lara Neumeier on 7 October 2026.
- 11th. Nemuel Fuerle on 7 October 2026.

Notable ascents of Requiem:

- 1st. Dave Cuthbertson on 6 July 1983.
- 1st Female Free Ascent. Caroline Ciavaldini on 27 September 2014.

== Filmography ==
- Documentary on MacLeod's 2006 ascent: Paul Diffley, Dave Brown (2006). E11. Hot Aches Productions.
- Documentary on Pearsons's 2014 return: Paul Diffley, Dave Brown (2014). Redemption: The James Pearson Story. Hot Aches Productions.

== See also ==
- Indian Face, British E9-graded traditional climbing route from 1986
- Separate Reality, American 5.12a-graded traditional climbing route from 1978
- Prinzip Hoffnung, Austrian 8b/+ graded traditional climbing route from 2009
