= James Pearson (climber) =

English rock climber (b 1985)

Personal information
- Born: December 15, 1985 (age 40) Matlock, Derbyshire, England
- Occupation: Rock climber
- Spouse: Caroline Ciavaldini
- Website: James Pearson

Climbing career
- Type of climber: Traditional climbing; Bouldering; Sport climbing
- Highest grade: Redpoint: 9a (5.14d); Bouldering: 8C (V15)
- First ascents: Bon Voyage (E12 9a, 2023); Le Voyage (E10, 2017); The Walk of Life (E9 6c, 2008); The Groove (E9 6c, 2008)
- Known for: First-ever person to climb an E12 graded traditional climbing route
- Updated on 16 May 2026

James Pearson (born 15 December 1985) is an English rock climber who has redpointed some of the hardest traditional climbing routes in the world, including Rhapsody at E11 8c+ (5.14c) and Tribe at E11 9a (5.14d). In 2023, he made the first ascent of Bon Voyage in Annot in France which became the world's first-ever traditional climbing route to have a consensus grade of E12 9a (5.14d).

== Climbing career ==
Pearson started climbing at only 16 but by 2005, aged 19, came to public prominence when he made the third ascent of Neil Bently's Equilibrium in South Yorkshire, which at the grade of E10 was one of the hardest traditional climbing routes in the world and the hardest in Britain at that time. In 2008, Pearson freed The Groove in Derbyshire, which was considered one of the "last great problems" of English gritstone traditional climbing (and another potential E11/E10, although later downgraded).

In September 2008, aged 22, Pearson made the first free ascent of The Walk of Life in Devon, a traditional climbing route he proposed at the grade of E12, which would make it the hardest traditional climbing route in the world, and a grade above Dave MacLeod's Rhapsody (E11 8c+). Pearson's grading became hugely controversial, and was compounded when MacLeod repeated The Walk of Life in 2009 and downgraded it to E9 6c, while Pearson failed to ascend Rhapsody but still dismissed it as an easier route. After the controversy, Pearson went into exile and relocated for France, where he met his wife, French climber Caroline Ciavaldini, who kept urging him to return to Rhapsody, where he made the fourth ascent in 2014. After the ascent, Pearson commented: "I couldn't take it back, but perhaps I could do something to make up for it? A gesture of goodwill, or perhaps even a peace offering to the UK climbing community?".

Pearson re-established himself as one of the world's leading traditional climbers. In 2020, he made the first repeat of Jacopo Larcher's Tribe in Italy, considered to be the world's first traditional route with a 9a (5.14d) rating (although Pearson declined to grade it). In 2022, he repeated Neil Gresham's Lexicon in England (also graded at E11), and in 2023 made the first free ascent of Bon Voyage in Annot in France. Pearson initially decided not to grade Bon Voyage, but after repeats by climbers such as Adam Ondra, Jacopo Larcher and Connor Herson, it has come be accepted as the world's first-ever consensus E12 9a (5.14d) graded traditional climbing route. After Bon Voyage, Pearson continued repeating famous traditional routes such as Parthian Shot (E10) in England, and made the first repeat of Dave MacLeod's Echo Wall (calling it "hard E11") in Scotland.

== Published works ==
- James Pearson; Caroline Ciavaldini (October 2017). Climbing Beyond: The World's Greatest Rock Climbing Adventures. Aurum.
- Paul Diffley (Director), Chris Prescott (Director) (May 2015). Redemption The James Pearson Story (DVD).

== See also ==
- History of rock climbing
- Hard Grit
- Sonnie Trotter
