= Clogwyn Du'r Arddu =

Cliff and climbing area, Wales

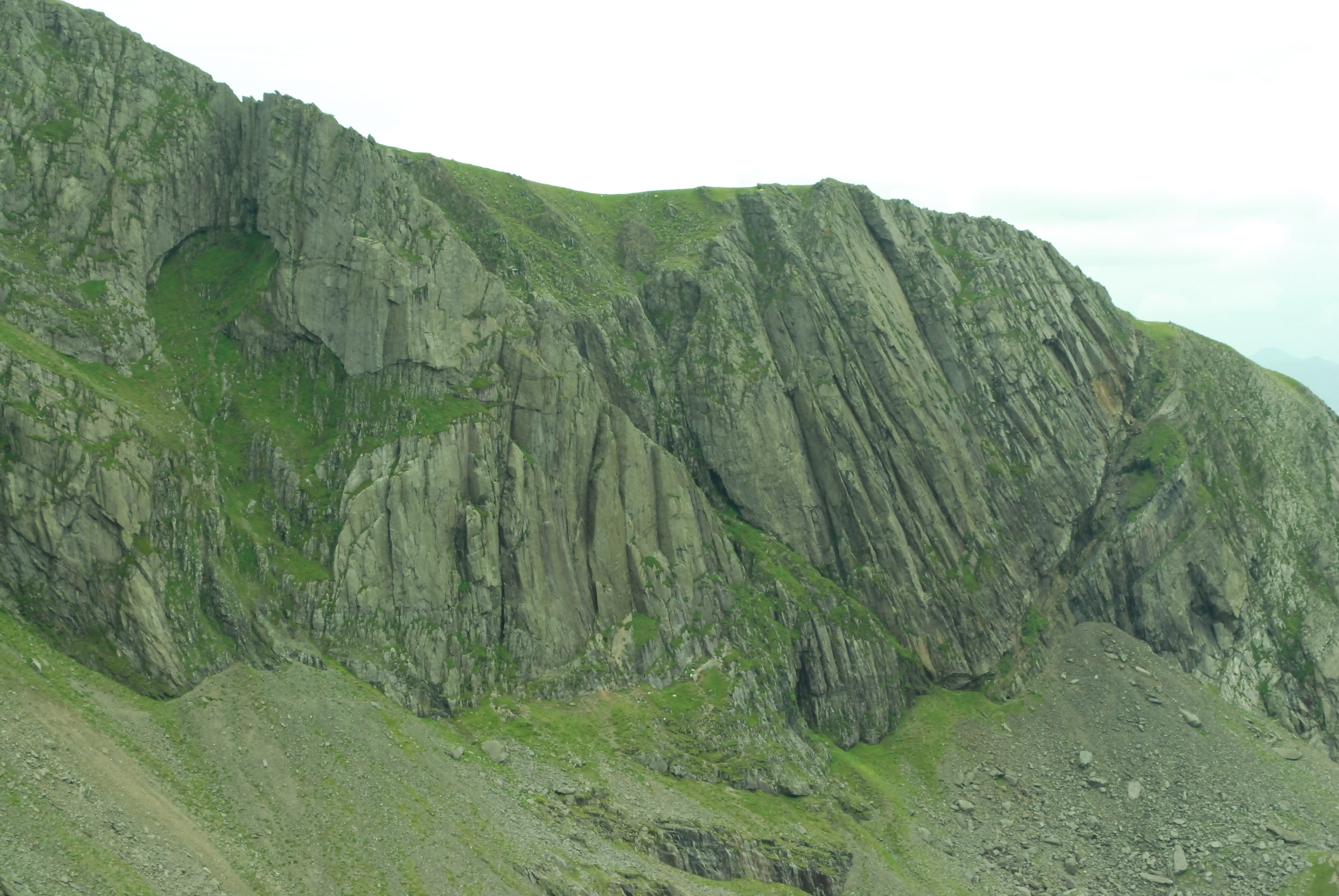
- Clogwyn Du'r Arddu, showing the East Buttress (centre), The Pinnacle (triangle on top left of East Buttress), West Buttress (diagonal-striped face right of East Buttress), and Far West Buttress (opposite diagonal-striped right of West Buttress)

- Location within Wales
- Location: Snowdonia, Wales
- Nearest city: Llanberis
- Range: Snowdon Massif
- Coordinates: 53.0792°N 4.0939°W
- Type of climbing: Traditional climbing
- Height range: up to 300 metres (980 ft)
- Pitches range: mostly multi-pitch
- Technical grades: rock grades of Diff to E9; winter grade of II to VIII
- Rock type: Rhyolite
- Quantity of routes: +215 routes
- Cliff aspect: North
- Elevation: 707 metres (2,320 ft) a.s.l.
- Guidebook: Llanberis: A Rock Climbing Guide to Dyffryn Peris, Clogwyn Du'r Arddu, & Y Lliwedd (2025)
- Classic climbs: Indian Face (E9 6c), Womb Bits (E5 6c), Great Wall (E4 6a), The Axe (E4 6a), White Slab (E2 5c), Shrike (E2 5c), Llitrig (E1 5c), Great-Bow (HVS 5a); Great Slab (VS 4c)

Clogwyn Du'r Arddu (Welsh pronunciation: [ˈklɔɡwɨ̞n ˈdɨːr ˈarðɨ̞]; 'black cliff of the black height') is a north-facing rhyolite set of cliffs located on the northern flank of Snowdon mountain. Clogwyn Du'r Arddu is considered to be one of the best traditional climbing areas in Britain, and has been called "The shrine of British climbing", and a "crucible for the development of most of the finest climbers in Britain and the scene of many of their finest achievements".

== Structure ==
Clogwyn Du'r Arddu is a north-facing mountain crag that requires a long walk-in from Llanberis. The cliff is broken into several large buttresses, most notably: East Buttress, The Pinnacle (lies above the East Buttress), West Buttress, and Far West Buttress. The cliff's circa 300 metres (980 ft) in height and mountain elevation, combined with the steepness and quality of rock, gives it the feel of a face on an alpine mountain.

== Climbing history ==
The first recorded climb was the 1798 ascent of the Eastern Terrace by Peter Bailey Williams and William Bingley, both botanists looking for alpine plants. However, it was not until the 1920s, that British rock climbers began to scale the main buttresses, starting with the East Buttress in 1927 (Fred Pigott with Pigott's Climb, 4 pitches 83-metres at HVS 5a), and the West Buttress in 1928 (Jack Longland, with Longland's Climb, 5 pitches 126-metres at VS 4c).

Since these early ascents, the cliff came to attract leading British rock climbers of every era including: Colin Kirkus (Great Slab 1930, and Chimney Route 1931 with J. Edwards, Curving Crack 1932), Joe Brown (The Boulder 1951, Llithrig 1952, The Corner 1952, Shrike 1952, November 1957), Don Whillans (Vember 1951, with J. Brown), and John Menlove Edwards (Chimney Route 1931 with C. Kirkus, and Bow Slab 1941).

During the mid-1980s, it became the focus of the leading British rock climbers of the day, particularly Jerry Moffatt (who freed Master's Wall in 1983), John Redhead (who freed Margins of the Mind in 1984), who were striving to free up the main face of the Great Wall (or Master's Wall), in the middle of the East Buttress. In 1986, Johnny Dawes eventually freed the route and called it Indian Face, which at a grade of E9 6c, was considered one of the most dangerous and difficult traditional rock climbs in the world.

While the cliff contains routes of all difficulties, few other crags in Britain contain such a concentration of routes above the extreme E7-grade.

== Filmography ==
- Documentary: Hughes, Alun (director) (2006). Johnny Dawes & The story of Indian Face (Motion picture). Hughes Prod.

== Bibliography ==
- North Wales Classics (Jack Geldard), 2010, Rockfax. ISBN 978-1-873341-17-9.
- North Wales Climbs (Mark Reeves, Jack Geldard, Mark Glaister), 2013, Rockfax. ISBN 978-1-873341-82-7.
- The Black Cliff: The history of rock climbing on Clogwyn du'r Arddu (Peter Crew, Jack Soper, Ken Wilson), 1971, Kaye & Ward ISBN 978-0718207908.

== See also ==
- Clogwyn railway station
- Dinas Cromlech, a mountain crag at Llanberis pass
- Dinorwic quarry, a slate climbing area near Llanberis
- History of rock climbing
