= Amhuinnsuidhe =

Coordinates: 57.966°N 7.001°W

Amhuinnsuidhe: Scottish Gaelic: Abhainn Suidhe
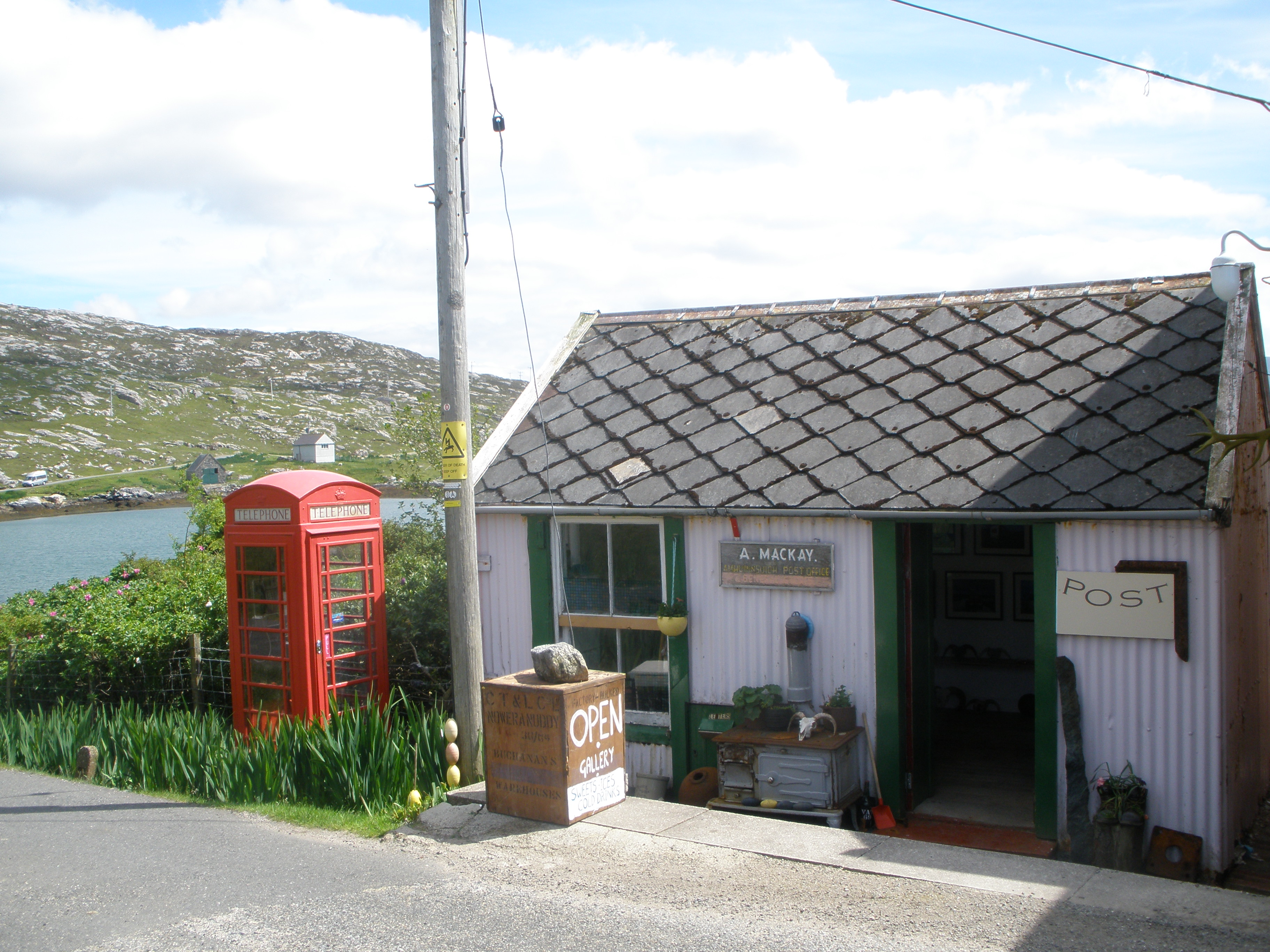
- Post Office and shop at Amhuinnsuidhe

- Location within the Outer Hebrides
- Language: Scottish Gaelic; English
- OS grid reference: NB043083
- Civil parish: Harris
- Council area: Na h-Eileanan Siar
- Lieutenancy area: Western Isles
- Country: Scotland
- Sovereign state: United Kingdom
- Post town: ISLE OF HARRIS
- Postcode district: HS3
- Dialling code: 01859
- Police: Scotland
- Fire: Scottish
- Ambulance: Scottish
- UK Parliament: Na h-Eileanan an Iar
- Scottish Parliament: Na h-Eileanan an Iar

Amhuinnsuidhe (Scottish Gaelic: Abhainn Suidhe) is a settlement on Harris, in the Outer Hebrides, Scotland. The settlement is also within the parish of Harris. Amhuinnsuidhe is centred on the country house, Amhuinnsuidhe Castle, which is adjacent to the B887 road.

== Geography ==
Amhuinnsuidhe lies on the northern shore of West Loch Tarbert on Harris. It is 8 miles (13 km) northwest of Tarbert. Sron Uladail, one of the highest sheer cliffs in the British Isles is located nearby.

== History ==
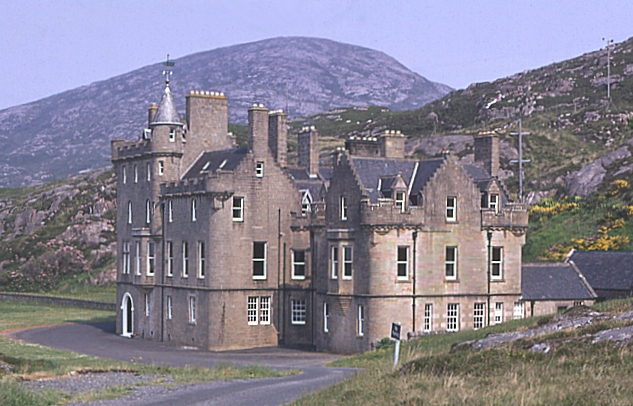
Amhuinnsuidhe Castle

Amhuinnsuidhe Castle was built in 1865 for Charles Murray, 7th Earl of Dunmore. The castle, as the North Harris Estate, remained in private ownership until 2003.

The 55,000-acre (220 km^{2}) estate was transferred to community ownership in 2003, when the North Harris Trust purchased the land in a community land purchase. The castle and fishing rights were purchased by Ian Scarr-Hall. They are now operated as Amhuinnsuidhe Castle Estate, a sporting hotel and conference venue.
