= Johnny Dawes =

British rock climber

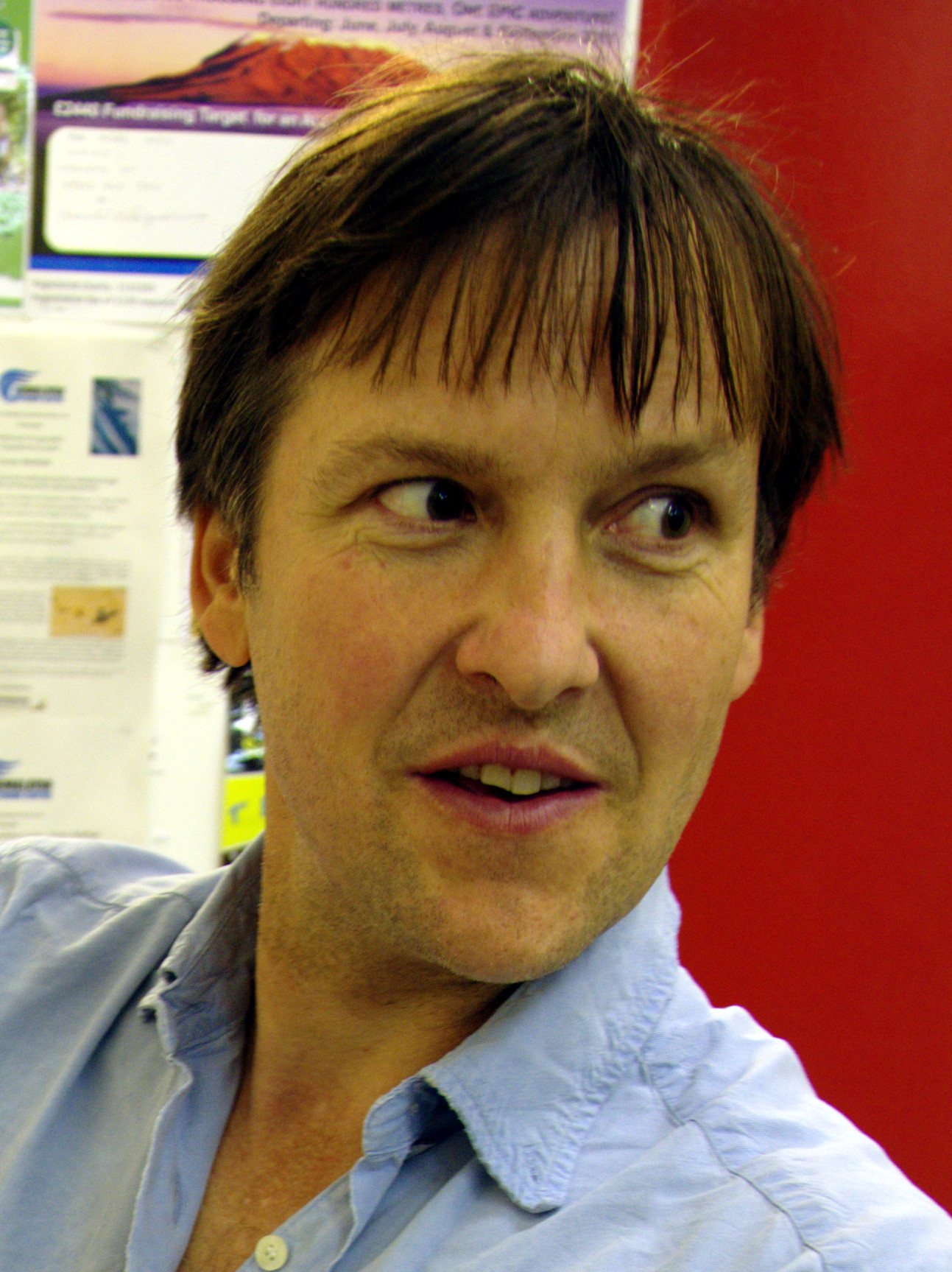
- Dawes, May 2011

Personal information
- Nickname: Stone Monkey
- Nationality: British
- Born: 9 May 1964 (age 62) Birmingham, West Midlands
- Education: Uppingham School
- Occupation: Professional rock climber
- Height: 5 ft 3 in (160 cm)
- Website: www.frictioneering.co.uk

Climbing career
- Type of climber: Traditional climbing, Sport climbing, Bouldering, Free solo climbing
- Highest grade: Redpoint: 8b+ (5.14a); Onsight/Flash: E7/8 6c; Bouldering: 7C (V9)
- First ascents: Gaia (E8 6c); Indian Face (E9 6c); The Quarryman (E8 7a); The Very Big & the Very Small 8b+ (5.14a)
- Major ascents: Indian Face (E9 6c)
- Known for: Extreme traditional routes

Johnny Dawes (born 9 May 1964) is a British rock climber and author, known for his dynamic and distinctive climbing style and his development of bold and intimidating traditional climbing routes. Most notable was his first free ascent of Indian Face, the first-ever route at the British traditional climbing E9-grade. His influence on British climbing was at its peak in the mid to late-1980s.

== Climbing career ==
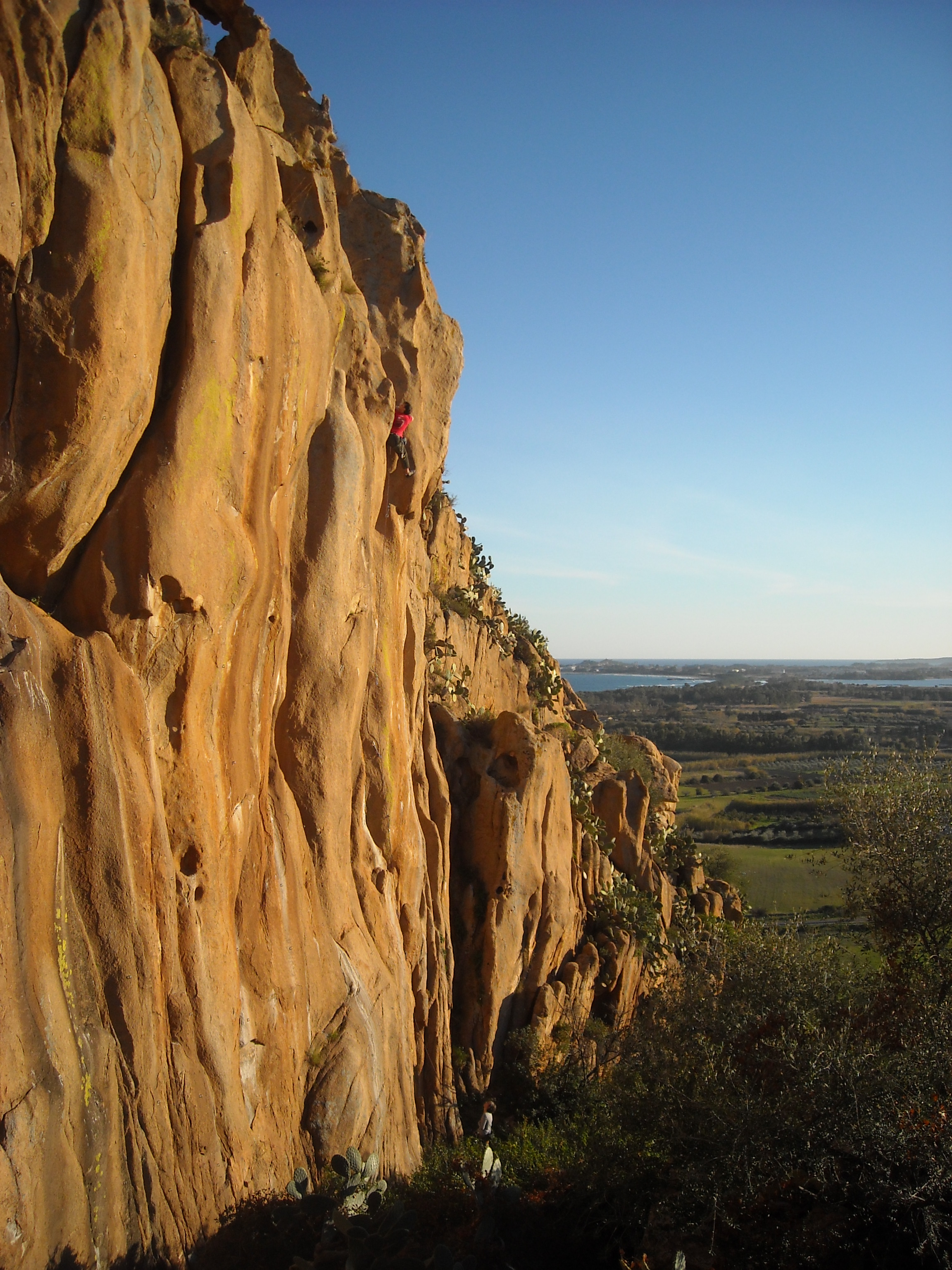
Dawes onsights Regalo da Babbo Natale 7b (5.12b), at Lucertole al Sole, Lotzorai, Sardinia. 2009

Dawes' climbing career splits into an initial period pre-1986 where he focused on gritstone in the Peak District, which was suited to his unique climbing style (e.g. Gaia, and End of the Affair). From 1986, Dawes focused on Wales and on a diverse range of rock, from the slab climbing routes in the slate quarries of Llanberis (e.g. The Quarryman, The Very Big and the Very Small, and Dawes of Perception), to the face routes on the quartzite cliffs of Gogarth North Stack (e.g. Conan the Librarian, and Hardback Thesaurus), and the rhyolite mountain crags of Clogwyn Du'r Arddu (e.g. Indian Face). Dawes is remembered for intimidating traditional climbing routes, in the legacy of Pete Livesey, Ron Fawcett and John Redhead, and less for sport climbing routes, unlike his contemporaries Jerry Moffatt and Ben Moon.

Dawes came to prominence outside of the rock climbing world with his 4 October 1986 ascent of Indian Face, (Note: The exact date is per the official guidebook to Clogwyn Du'r Arddu, and also used by the British Mountaineering Council.) the first E9-graded traditional rock route in Britain, and at the time, considered to be the hardest and most dangerous traditional route in the world. The guidebook described it as "A pitch of such appalling difficulty as to be almost beyond the realms of human comprehension". In a 2011 interview, Dawes said: "As you set off it's best to consider yourself already dead. You just do it". The climb, and rare repeats, are the subject of a 2006 documentary, Johnny Dawes and the Story of Indian Face.

In 1993, Dawes was a member of an expedition funded by the Mount Everest Foundation to attempt the first ascent of The Shark's Fin on Meru Peak in Gangotri Himalaya, India; a dropped boot led to a forced descent from 6,000 meters to avoid frostbite.

An autobiographical account of his climbing, Full of Myself, was published in 2011.

=== Style ===
Dawes had a uniquely dynamic technique, leaping between very small holds, and also for his levels of balance and foot-control that enable him to climb extreme-grade routes without using his hands. Welsh climber George Smith said: "His climbing seemed choreographed rather than constructed in a gym. If there's perfect pitch for movement, he has it". Aspects of his unique technique was captured in the 1986 climbing film, Stone Monkey, considered one of the best-ever films in the genre, as well as the 2015 climbing series, No Handed Climbing, and other "no-hands", and "no-feet" videos.

His unorthodox climbing style, coupled with his reputation for a keen intellect and an artistic or bohemian bent, made Dawes an enigmatic and mercurial character in British climbing. His writing has been called "quirky, convoluted, and often obscure", and a tendency to "speak in riddles" earned him the titles of "nutty professor", and of "mad genius" from some commentators. His approach also made it difficult to secure commercial sponsorship, with Dawes saying in a 2019 interview, "I wasn’t supported by the climbing industry because I didn't fit the commercial template".

== Legacy ==
Dawes is widely considered a legend of British rock climbing, and one of the most influential figures in British rock climbing history. Over a career spanning the early-1980s to the early-1990s, he pushed the technical level of traditional climbing with routes that were unprecedented both in terms of difficulty, and the style in which they were climbed. In 2012, The Guardian called Dawes a "defining figure" and wrote that: "His climbs were rated among the very hardest in the world, test pieces of both balance and nerve, some with a reputation for terrible danger". Some of his routes are still so intimidating that they are rarely repeated, and several feature in climbing films focused on Dawes (e.g. 80s Birth of Extreme) and his routes (e.g. Hard Grit, Quarrymen).

== Personal life ==
Dawes was born in 1964 in Birmingham, into a wealthy family, whose parents were part of the 1960s British motor racing scene. His education at the Uppingham School was a difficult one, with Dawes suffering from periods of depression and bullying.

Dawes rejected the career path of his contemporaries into third-level education and then a likely London-based career, choosing instead to obsess on climbing, telling The Guardian, "I was in a shut-off state, to a certain extent. When I was doing something dangerous it would wake me up".

In 2011, Dawes was diagnosed with hypothyroidism, which he called "depressing and heavy"; by 2018, treatment enabled him to climb at 8b+ (5.14a).

== Notable ascents ==
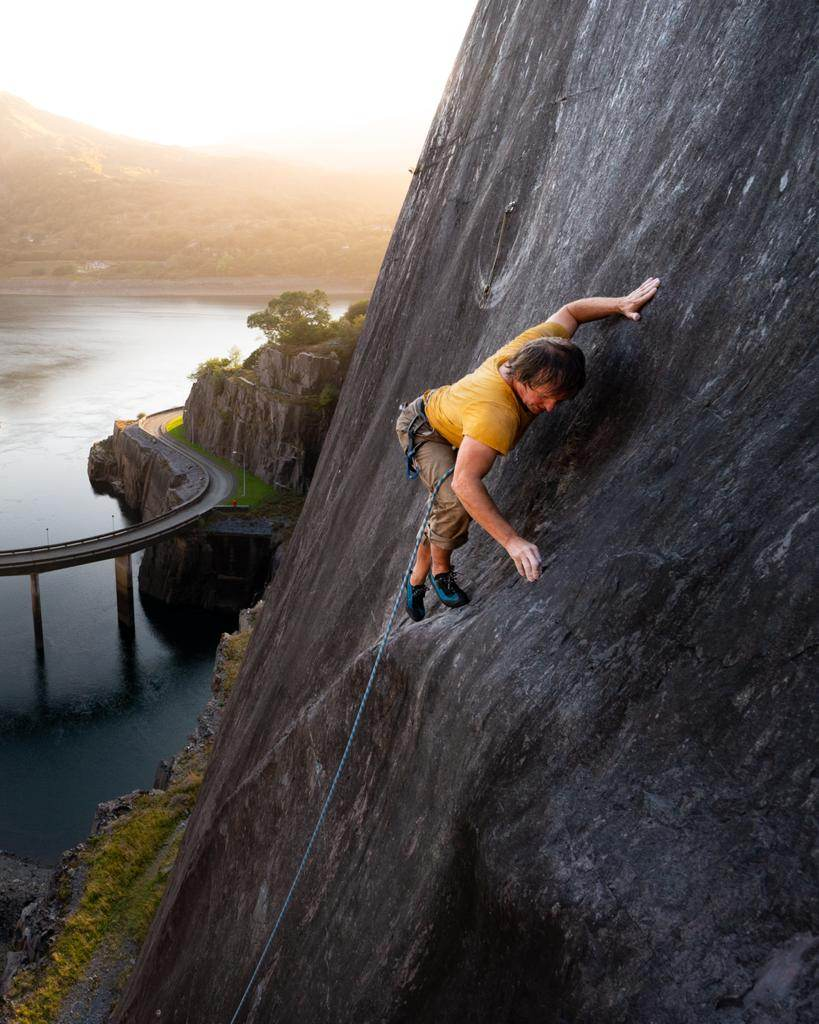
Dawes on Poetry Pink (E5 6b), Rainbow Slab, Dinorwic quarry, North Wales

- 1983: Monopoly (E7 6b), Millstone Edge. First ascent. Originally climbed with side-runners, Dawes reclimbed it in 1984 with a low peg runner (now removed).
- 1984: The Salmon (E7 6c), Bamford Edge. First ascent. Reclimbed by Dawes as Smoked Salmon at E8 7b in 1995, after it lost a crucial pebble.
- 1984: The Braille Trail (E7 6c), Burbage South Edge. First ascent.
- 1985: Dawes of Perception (E7 6c), Vivian Quarry, Llanberis. First ascent.
- 1986: Janus (E7 6b), Curbar Edge. First ascent.
- 1986: Slab and Crack (E7/8, 6c), Curbar Edge. First ascent.
- 1986: Gaia (E8 6c), Black Rocks, Derbyshire. First ascent. Britain's first grade-E8; featured in the 1998 film, Hard Grit; repeats are coveted.
- 1986: End of the Affair (E8 6c), Curbar Edge. First ascent. Dawes' hardest gritstone route, and the end of a period of focus by Dawes on gritstone.
- 1986: Indian Face (E9 6c), Clogwyn Du'r Arddu, Snowdonia. First ascent. Britain's first grade-E9, and considered the world's hardest 'trad' climb at the time; features in the 2006 climbing-film, Johnny Dawes and the Indian Face.
- 1986: The Quarryman (E8 7a), Twll Mawr, Dinorwic quarry, Llanberis. First ascent, 4 pitches on Welsh slate, one of the hardest climbing routes at the time, now part of a 2019 climbing film, The Quarrymen, and its notorious Groove pitch features in the 1986 climbing film, Stone Monkey. Dawes soon added the Fire Escape alternative finish (E7 6c).
- 1986: Conan the Librarian (E7 6b), Gogarth North Stack. First ascent, with Bob Dury.
- 1986: Come to Mother (E7 6a), Gogarth South Stack. First ascent with Paul Pritchard. The route has now fallen down.
- 1986: The Hollow Man (E8 6b), Gogarth North Stack. First ascent with Andy Pollit.
- 1987: The Scoop (E7 6b, 8-pitches), Strone Ulladale, Harris. First ascent with Paul Pritchard of Doug Scott's 1969 grade-A5 aid climbing route; the free ascent was considered to be one of British climbing's "great challenges"; shown in the 1988 film, The 80s: Birth of Extreme.
- 1987: Coeur de Lion (E8 7a), Twll Mawr, Dinorwic quarry, Llanberis. First ascent. Unrepeated until 2015.
- 1988: Hardback Thesaurus (E7/8 6c), Gogarth North Stack. First ascent and first onsight at E7; shown in 1988 film, The 80s: Birth of Extreme.
- 1990: The Very Big & the Very Small 8b+ (5.14a), Rainbow Slab Area, Dinorwic quarry, Llanberis. First ascent. Only 3-bolts, hardest slate route at time; rarely repeated; Dawes believes grade is 8c.
- 1994: Angel's Share (E8 7a, or 7C (V9)), Black Rocks. First ascent. Gritstone slab at E8 7a without pads, or a 7C (V9) boulder with pads.
- 1995: Face Mecca (E9 6c), Clogwyn Du'r Arddu, Snowdonia. Second ascent. FFA Nick Dixon in 1989.
- 2003: Drummond Base (E8 6c), Curbar Edge. First ascent.

== Bibliography ==
- Peak Rock – The History, The Routes, The Climbers, (Phil Kelly, Graham Hoey, Giles Barker), 2013. ISBN 978-1906148720.
- Full of Myself (Johnny Dawes), 2011. ISBN 978-0957030800.

== Filmography ==
- Best Forgotten Art (1996) A history of crack climbing in Britain, directed by Johnny Dawes
- Documentary on The Quarryman (E8 7a): Hart, Neil (director) (2019). The Quarrymen (Motion picture).
- Documentary on The Indian Face (E9 6c): Hughes, Alun (director) (2006). Johnny Dawes. Story of Indian Face (Motion picture). Hughes Prod.
- Documentary on the hardest gritstone routes in Peak District: Heap, Richard (director) (1998). Hard Grit (Motion picture). Slackjaw Film.
- Documentary on leading UK climbers: Sid Perou (director) (1988). The Climbers (Motion picture). BBC.
- Documentary on Dawes, Ben Moon and Jerry Moffatt: Hughes, Alun (director) (1988). The 80s: Birth of Extreme (Motion picture). Hughes Film.
- Documentary on Dawes' technique: Williams, Huw (director) (1988). Stone Monkey: Portrait of a rock climber (Motion picture). Hughes Film.

== See also ==
- History of rock climbing
- List of grade milestones in rock climbing
- Dave MacLeod, Scottish traditional climber
- Sonnie Trotter, Canadian traditional climber
- Rock climbing in the Peak District
