= Dave MacLeod =

Scottish rock climber

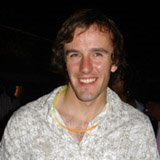

Personal information
- Nationality: Scottish
- Born: 17 July 1978 (age 48)
- Education: BSc in Physiology & Sports Science (Glasgow University), MSc in Medicine and Science in Sport & Exercise (Glasgow University), MSc in Human Nutrition (Glasgow University)
- Website: www.davemacleod.com

Climbing career
- Type of climber: Traditional climbing; Free solo climbing; Bouldering; Mixed climbing
- Highest grade: Bouldering: 8C (V15); Free solo: 8b+ (5.14a)
- First ascents: Rhapsody (2006, E11 7a, 8c+ (5.14c)); Echo Wall (2008, E11 7a)
- Known for: First-ever person to free an 8c+ (5.14c) graded traditional climbing route; Second-ever person to free solo at 8b+ (5.14a)
- Updated on 6 November 2017

Dave MacLeod (born 17 July 1978) is a Scottish rock climber, ice climber, mixed climber, and climbing author. MacLeod is known for being the second-ever person in history to free solo an 8b+ (5.14a) graded rock climbing route, which he did with his 2008 ascent of Darwin Dixit in Margalef, and for being the first-ever person in history to free an E11 / 8c+ (5.14c) graded traditional climbing route with his 2006 acsent of Rhapsody on Dumbarton Rock.

== Climbing career ==
=== Rock climbing ===
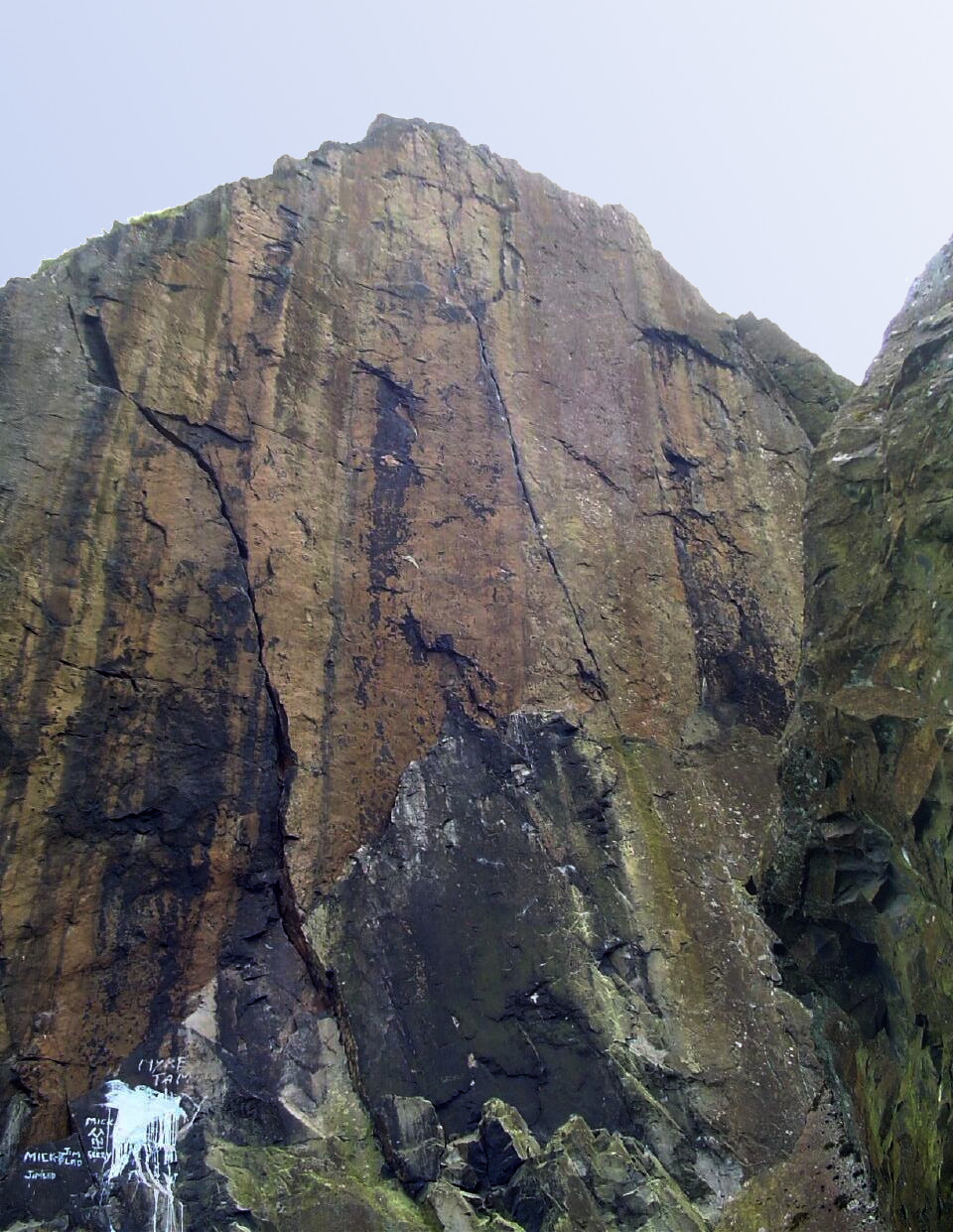
North West face of Dumbarton Rock. Rhapsody and Requiem follow the line of the thin and tallest crack in the centre of the face. Rhapsody holds the line of the crack all the way to the top, while Requiem veers right.

In April 2006, MacLeod established the climb Rhapsody on Dumbarton Rock which, at a grade of E11 7a, was the hardest traditional climbing route in the world at the time. The ascent of Rhapsody is the subject of the movie E11 (2006) directed by Paul Diffley and produced by Hot Aches Productions.

In 2008, MacLeod became the second-ever person free solo an 8b+ (5.14a) graded route (Darwin Dixit in Margalef).

In 2008, MacLeod made the first free ascent of another traditional climbing route he called Echo Wall, on Ben Nevis, which took two years of preparation. MacLeod left the route ungraded but in 2024, suggested a grade of E10 7a for the route. In 2024, James Pearson made the first repeat of Echo Wall calling it "hard E11".

In addition to his achievements in traditional rock climbing, MacLeod has also created new sport climbing routes and completed projects up to the grade of 9a (5.14d) (A Muerte at Siurana, in 2007), and has established bouldering problems up to the grade of 8B+ (V14) (Natural Method on the Skeleton Boulder at Glen Nevis in 2012).

On 28 August 2010, MacLeod and Tim Emmett established the route The Usual Suspects on Sron Uladail on Harris, provisionally graded E9 7a, in an ascent broadcast live on BBC Two Scotland. As part of their preparation, MacLeod and Emmett successfully established five new routes on five Hebridean islands (counting Lewis with Harris as two separate islands) in five days, an achievement documented in the BBC Scotland series 5 Climbs, 5 Islands (later released on DVD as Triple 5). MacLeod has continued his association with BBC Scotland, filming The First Great Climb (broadcast on 22 November 2011), in which he replicated a successful 1876 attempt on the Stack of Handa using the type of equipment that would have been available at the time, and Climbing – No Limits! (broadcast on 12 April 2012), establishing new routes in the Yorkshire Dales and the Peak District.

=== Mixed climbing ===
MacLeod has also established hard routes in mixed climbing with ice axes and crampons, climbing Good Training for Something with Canadian climber Will Gadd at a grade of M12. In 2005, he established the hardest traditional mixed climbing route in the world at the time, The Hurting in Coire an t-Sneachda, Cairngorms. The route has been repeated a few times and has a Scottish winter grade of XI,11 (M9+/M10) with hard, technical climbing over very poor protection.

=== Writing ===
In December 2009, Macleod's book 9 Out of 10 Climbers Make the Same Mistakes: Navigation Through the Maze of Advice for the Self-coached Climber was published. In 2015, Macleod's book Make or Break: Don't Let Climbing Injuries Dictate Your Success was published. In November 2024, Macleod's book Moving the Needle: How an Average Climber Can Do the Hardest Route in the World was published. MacLeod has written widely on nutrition, and eats beef and eggs daily in the belief that animal products are essential for good mental health.

== Bibliography ==
- MacLeod, Dave (2009). 9 Out of 10 Climbers Make the Same Mistakes. Rare Breed Productions. ISBN 978-0956428103.
- MacLeod, Dave (2015). Make or Break: Don't Let Climbing Injuries Dictate Your Success. Rare Breed Productions. ISBN 978-0956428134.
- MacLeod, Dave (2024). Moving the Needle: How an Average Climber Can Do the Hardest Route in the World. Rare Breed Productions. ISBN 978-0956428158.

== See also ==
- History of rock climbing
- List of grade milestones in rock climbing
- Johnny Dawes, British traditional climber
- Sonnie Trotter, Canadian traditional climber
