= Uladail =

Cliff on the Isle of Harris, Outer Hebrides, Scotland

Coordinates: 58.01307°N 6.94583°W

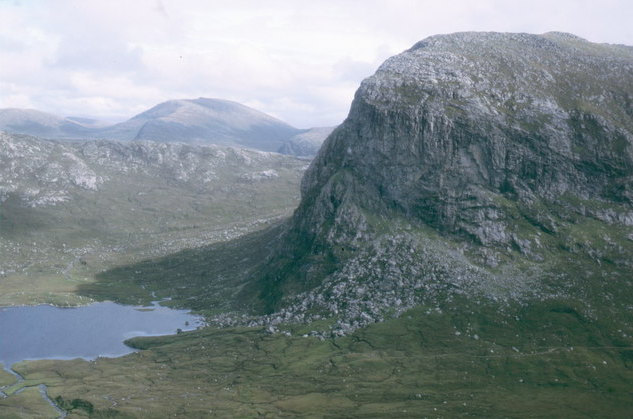
Sròn Uladail

Uladail is a location near Amhuinnsuidhe, on Harris in the Outer Hebrides, Scotland.

Sron Ulladail is a sheer cliff which at 370 metres (1,210 ft) is one of the highest in the British Isles. It stands over Loch Uladail.
