= Sonnie Trotter =

Canadian professional climber (born 1979)

Personal information
- Born: 15 November 1979 (age 47) Toronto, Canada.
- Occupation: Professional rock climber
- Website: www.sonnietrotter.com

Climbing career
- Type of climber: Traditional climbing; Crack climbing; Sport climbing; Bouldering
- Highest grade: Redpoint: 5.15a (9a+); Bouldering: V12 (8A+)
- First ascents: Cobra Crack (5.14b, 2006); The Path (5.14a R, 2007)
- Updated on 8 February 2023

Sonnie Trotter (born 15 November 1979) is a Canadian professional climber, known for his strength in many rock climbing disciplines – particularly traditional climbing – and contributing to hundreds of first free ascents around the world.

== Climbing career ==
Trotter began climbing in 1997 at age 16 and became the first Canadian to climb at grade 5.14c, and the third North American to make the first free ascent of a 5.14d (9a) graded route. In later years, Trotter became known for his traditional climbing routes, and his first free ascent of the Cobra Crack in Squamish, British Columbia. In 2006, Trotter and climbing partner Matt Segal, connected The Shadow (5.13b), The Grand Wall (5.13b), and The Black Dyke (5.13b), on the Stawamus Chief in Squamish, in a single 12-hour push.

== Personal life ==
He currently works at Elevation Place in Canmore, Alberta. He lives in Canmore with his wife, daughter and son. In 2025, he published a book of his climbing experiences "Uplifted: The Evolution of a Climbing Life". In 2025, he started a YouTube interview series "Stronger than you think" about modern training techniques. Interview subjects include climbers Josh Muller, Connor Herson, Jacopo Larcher, Babsi Zangerl, Matt Samet, and Josh Wharton.

== Filmography ==
Trotter has been featured in three award-winning films. "The Cobra Crack", won the best short film at the BIMFF in 2006. "If you're not falling" won Best Short Film at BIMFF in 2008 and "First Ascent" is the winner of multiple awards. Trotter is also prominently featured in the opening scenes of the hit motion picture 'The Twilight Saga: Breaking Dawn - Part 2' being chased by Bella while free soloing."

== Notable ascents ==
=== Traditional routes ===
- The Prophet (5.13d R), November 2011, El Capitan. First repeat with Will Stanhope of Leo Houlding's 2010 traditional climbing route.
- Rhapsody (5.14c R, E11 7a), June 2008, Dumbarton, Scotland. First repeat of Dave MacLeod's famous traditional climbing route, world's first E11.
- The Path (5.14a R, E10/11), August 2007, Lake Louise, Alberta. First free ascent having chopped the bolts off an abandoned sport climb project.
- Cobra Crack (5.14b, E9), June 2006, Squamish, British Columbia. First free ascent of one of the world's hardest and most coveted crack climbs.
- East Face (Monkey Face) (5.13d R), 2004, Smith Rocks. First ascent to use only traditional climbing gear on Alan Watts' sport climbing route.

=== Sport routes ===
- Estado Critico (5.14d), 7 April 2015, Oliana, Spain.
- Forever Expired (5.14d, FA in 2004), Ontario's hardest route to date
- Necessary Evil 5.14c (8c+), March 2003, Virgin River Gorge, Arizona. Repeat of Chris Sharma's famous 1997 route, the first 5.14c in America.
- Superman (5.14c), 2002, Cheakamus Canyon, Squamish. First ascent of a link-up of several existing routes.
- Just Do It (5.14c)
- Sugar Daddy (5.14a, FA in 2010), Nightmare Rock, Squamish BC.
- Ewbank Route, Totem Pole (5.12d R in 2015), free ascent of the original aid line on Tasmania's iconic sea column (climbed in one pitch).

=== Boulder routes ===
- The Proposal V12 (8A+), Squamish, British Columbia
- The Egg V11 (8A), Squamish, British Columbia

== See also ==
- History of rock climbing
- List of first ascents (sport climbing)
- Dave MacLeod, Scottish traditional climber
- Johnny Dawes, British traditional climber
