= Traditional climbing =

Type of rock climbing

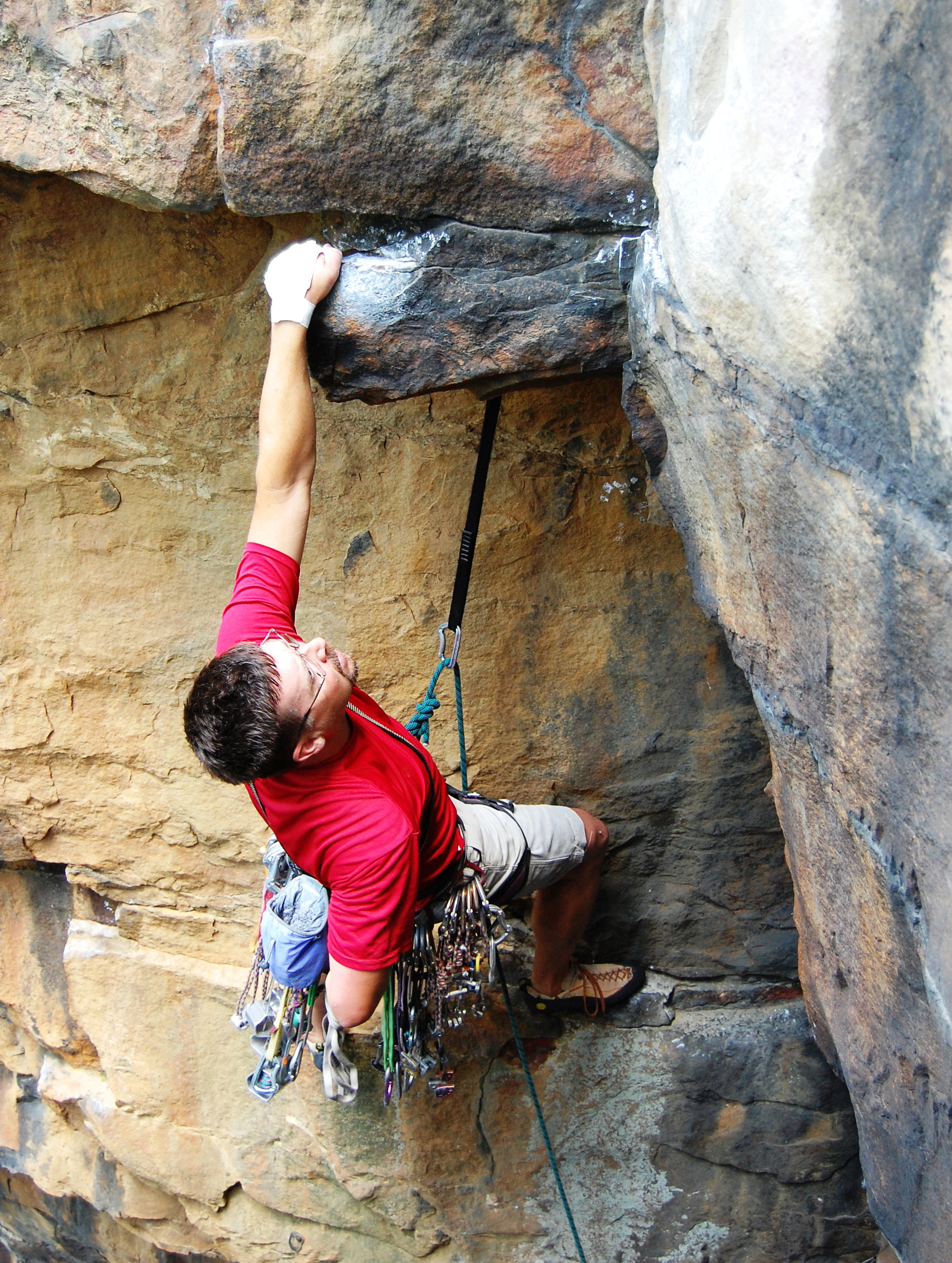
A traditional climber leading the route, Super Crack 5.9 (5c), in the New River Gorge, West Virginia

Traditional climbing (or trad climbing) is a type of free climbing in the sport of rock climbing in which the lead climber places temporary and removable protection while simultaneously ascending the route; when the lead climber has completed the route, the second climber (also called the belayer) will remove this protection as they ascend the route. Traditional climbing differs from sport climbing where the protection equipment is already pre-drilled into the rockface in the form of permanent bolts. Traditional climbing is still the dominant format on longer multi-pitch climbing routes, such as on alpine and big wall routes.

Traditional climbing carries a much higher level of risk than with bolted sport-climbing as the climber may not have placed the temporary protection equipment correctly while trying to ascend the route, or there may be few opportunities such as cracks and fissures to insert satisfactory protection (e.g. on very difficult routes). Traditional climbing was once the dominant form of free climbing but since the mid-1980s, sport climbing — and its related form of competition climbing — became more popular for single pitch routes, and all technical grade milestones from 8a+ (5.13c) onwards were set on single-pitch sport-climbing routes.

From the early 2000s, single-pitch traditional climbing returned to prominence as climbers greenpointed notable sport-climbing routes (e.g. Greenspit), and set new grade milestones (e.g. Cobra Crack at 8c (5.14b) by Sonnie Trotter, and Rhapsody at 8c+ (5.14c) by Dave MacLeod). In 2008, Beth Rodden created Meltdown, which at 8c+ (5.14c) matched the hardest traditional routes ascended by men. In 2023, James Pearson climbed the first consensus E12 with Bon Voyage, and in 2025, Connor Herson proposed the first-ever traditional route at 9a+ (5.15a) with his first free ascent of Drifter's Escape.

== Description ==
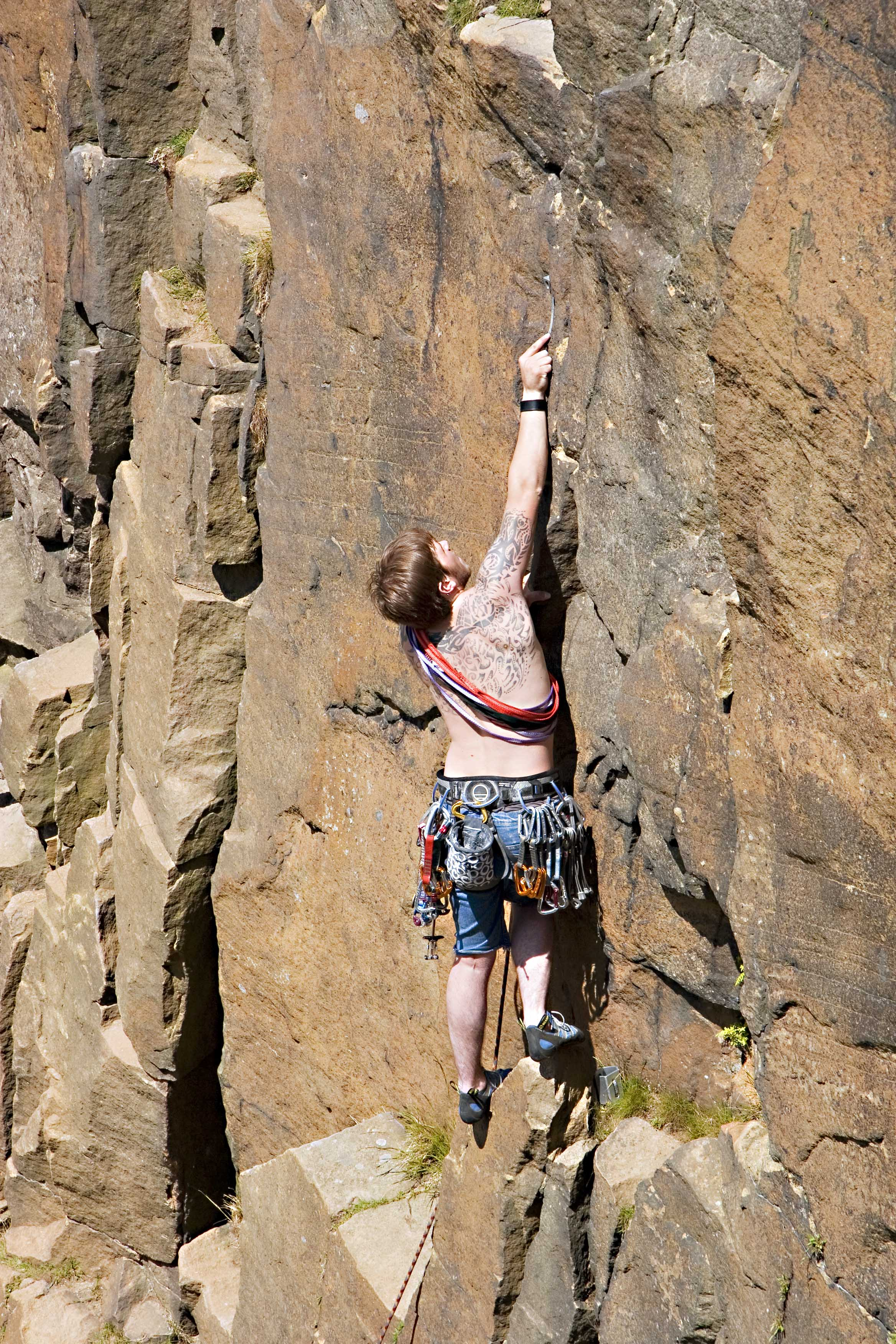
Climber leading a traditional climbing route, attempting to insert a nut for their climbing protection.

Traditional climbing is a form of free climbing, which means that no artificial or mechanical devices can be used to aid progression, unlike with aid climbing. It is performed in 'lead climbing pairs' where the lead climber places removable and temporary climbing protection into the climbing route while they are ascending.

After the lead climber has reached the top, the second climber—or belayer—removes this temporary climbing protection as they climb the route. Some consider the hammering in of pitons while climbing the route—as long as they are only for climbing protection and not to aid progression—to also be traditional climbing, but this is not universally accepted, and is against the ethos of clean climbing to which traditional climbing is closely related.

Removeable protection devices

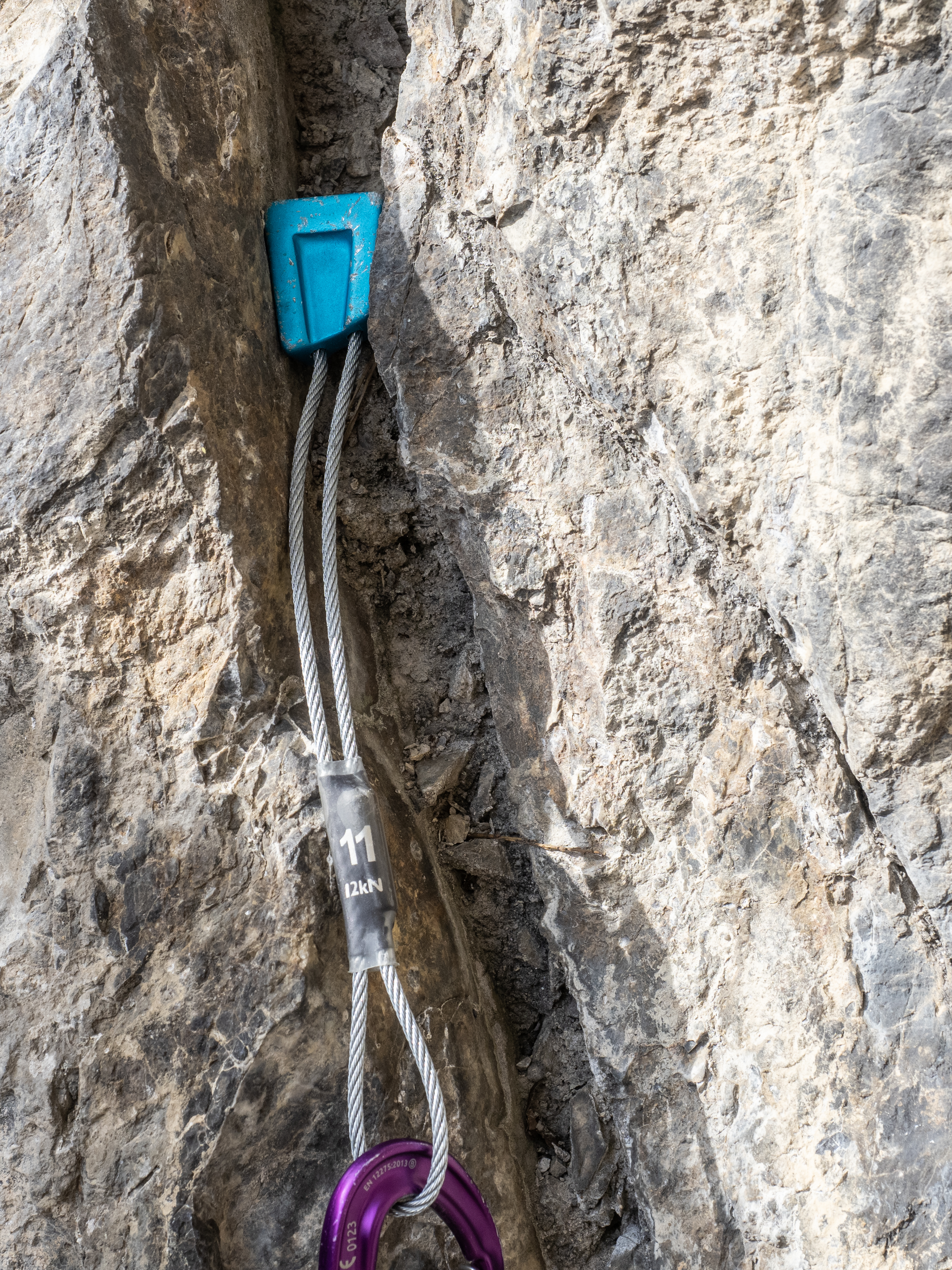
Removable nut

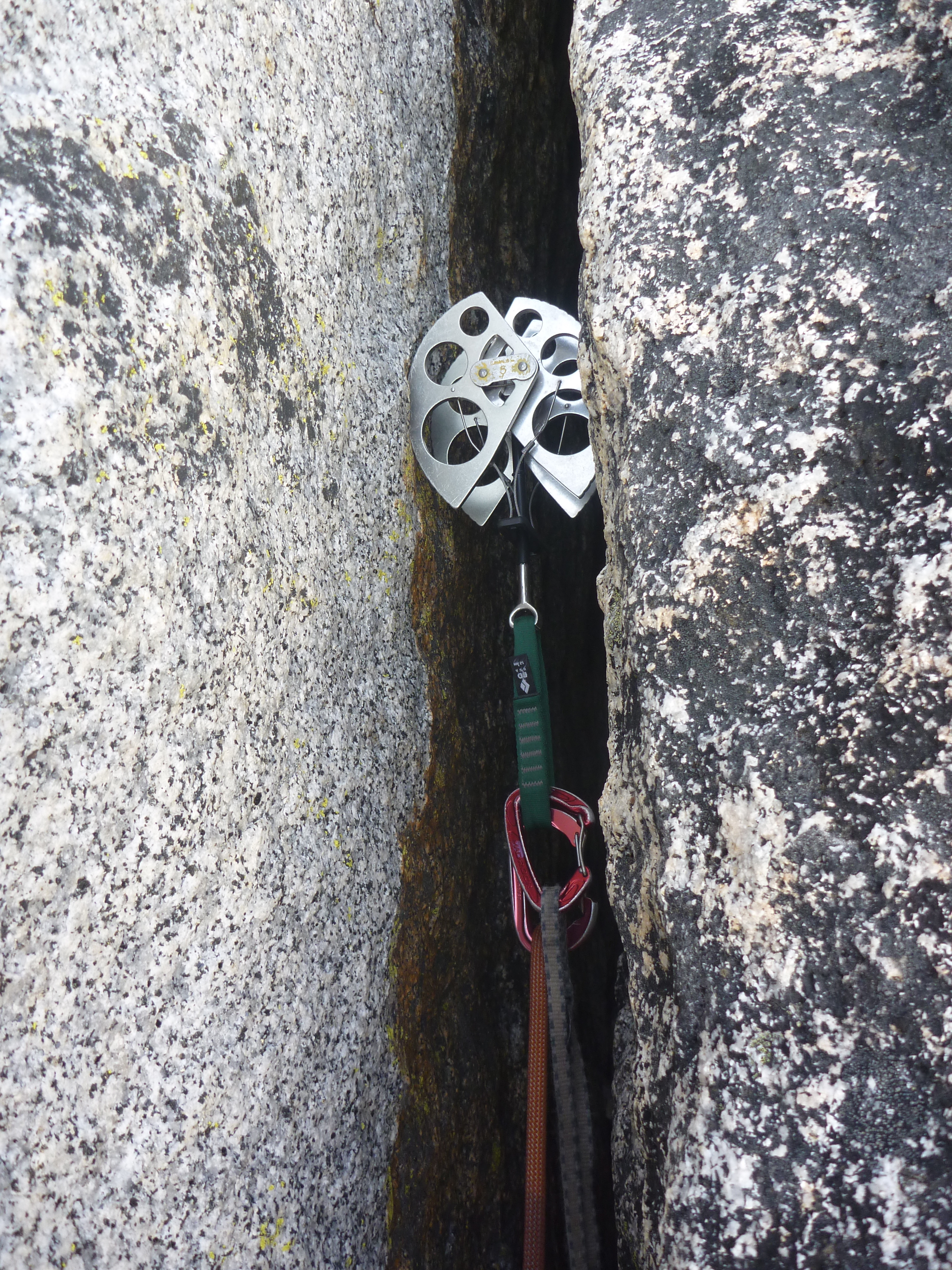
Removable SLCD

Traditional climbing differs from sport climbing which has in-situ climbing protection already pre-bolted into the rock on the climbing route, and the lead climber just has to clip their rope—via quickdraws—into the fixed bolts as they ascend. As a result, sport climbing is thus a much safer and less stressful or physically demanding form of free climbing than traditional climbing. Traditional climbing is distinct from free solo climbing where no climbing protection is used whatsoever.

=== First free ascent ===
With the greater popularity of sport climbing, traditional climbing began to embrace some of sport climbing's redpointing techniques that are allowed in qualifying a sport-climb as a first free ascent (FFA). The previously controversial practices of hangdogging (which means repeatedly falling at a crux but without returning to the base of the climb each time), and headpointing (which means practicing the route on a top rope beforehand) are now accepted by the leading traditional climbers as valid techniques.

Around the turn of the 21st century, traditional climbers began to introduce the derived term 'greenpointing' (from the Grünpunkt movement, as a play on the sport climbing Rotpunkt movement), to describe completing an ascent of an established pre-bolted sport-climb but only using "traditional protection". In some cases, the sport-climbing bolts would be physically removed—or 'chopped'—to restore the route to its natural un-bolted state as a purer form of challenge to the climber.

== History ==
As 20th-century rock climbers began to free climb (avoiding any form of aid in overcoming the challenges), they often used traditional climbing techniques for their protection. Early traditional climbers relied on crude—often unreliable—forms of homemade "passive" climbing protection such as pieces of metal or chockstones attached to slings, which eventually became replaced by professionally manufactured passive protection in the form of nuts and hexes from specialist climbing equipment manufacturers.

With the development of "active" traditional climbing protection in the 1970s—typically called spring-loaded camming devices (SLCDs, or "friends")—the grades of technical difficulty that traditional climbers could safely undertake on crack climbing routes increased dramatically, and new grade milestones were set on new traditional climbing routes. By the mid-1980s, the leading traditional climbers were facing technical challenges on their hardest projects as they had with minimal possibilities for traditional active climbing protection—examples being the face climbing routes they were attempting that had tiny or no cracks whatsoever in which to insert SLCDs. Ascending these routes as traditional climbs would mean using less protection and required them to accept significant personal risks—Johnny Dawes's 1986 ascent of Indian Face being a notable example.

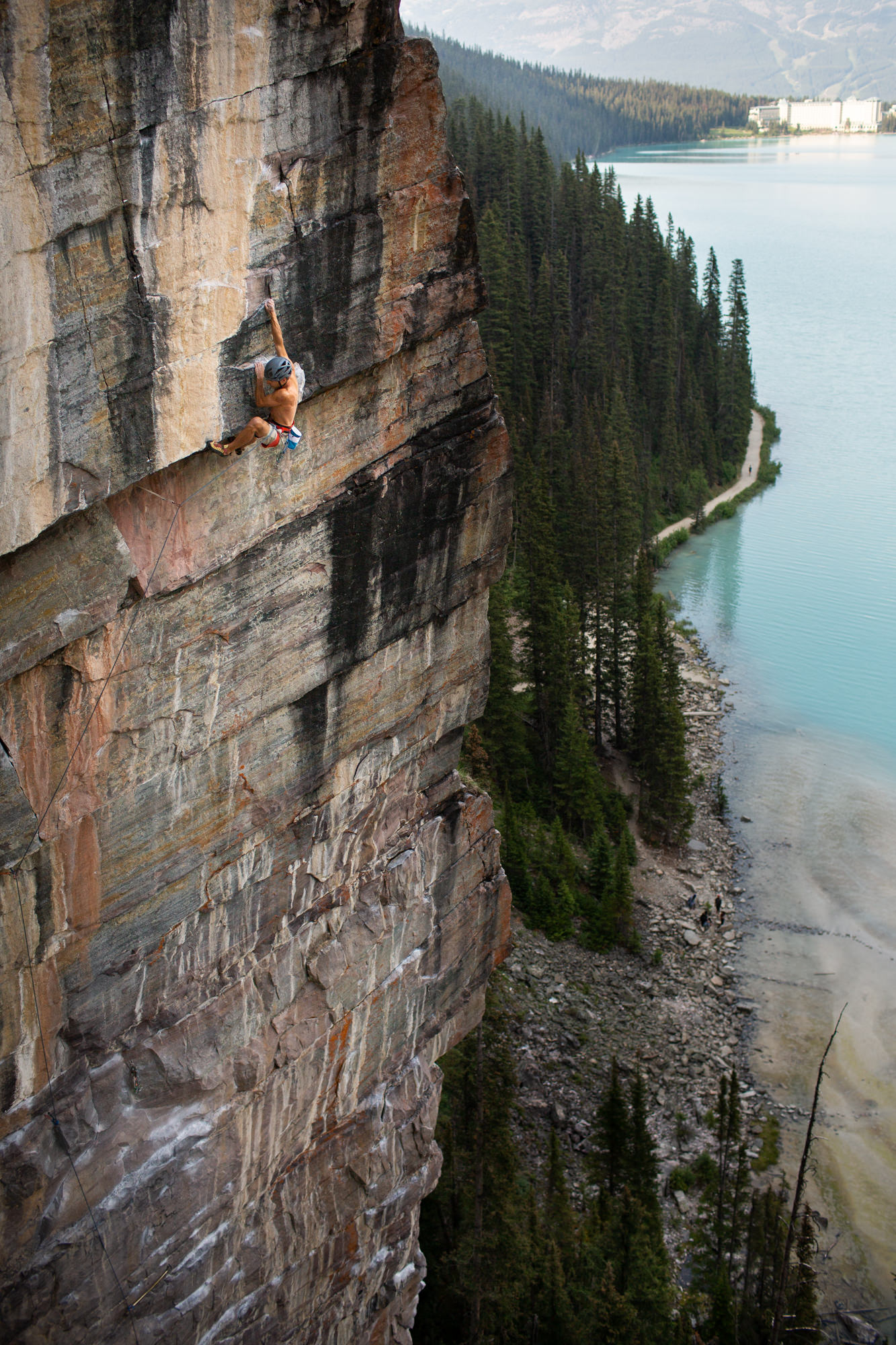
Jonathan Siegrist on The Path 5.14a R, 8b+, at Lake Louise

Durning this era, French climbers such as Patrick Edlinger began to pre-drill permanent masonry bolts into the almost "blank" faces of Buoux and Verdon for their protection—but not as artificial aid—which became known as 'sport climbing' (e.g., it was climbing for the pure sport of it with minimal risks to the climber). It led to a dramatic increase in climbing standards – all future new grade milestones would be set on sport climbing routes. The increased safety of pre-drilled bolts also led to the development and popularity of competition climbing and the emergence of the "professional" rock climber. Sport climbing became—and remains today—the most popular form of single-pitch rock climbing, with traditional climbing more popular in mountainous multi-pitch climbing situation, such as in big wall and in alpine climbing.

Traditional single-pitch climbing returned to public prominence when in 2003, Swiss climber Didier Berthod greenpointed the notable bolted sport climb, Greenspit 8b (5.13d), to create one of the hardest traditional crack routes in the world at grade E9. In 2006, Canadian climber Sonnie Trotter greenpointed The Path 8b+ (5.14a), to create one of the world's hardest traditional climbs at the time. Trotter, and other leading 'trad' climbers such as Dave MacLeod, led a resurgence in traditional climbing by creating new grade milestones on routes such as Cobra Crack (E10, 5.14b, 8c) and Rhapsody (E11, 5.14c R/X, 8c+). The increased prominence of traditional climbing attracted leading sport climbers who themselves began to repeat—and create—major traditional routes (e.g. Ethan Pringle with BlackBeard's Tears and Beth Rodden with Meltdown). In 2023, when British climber James Pearson created the world's first E12 grade traditional route with Bon Voyage in France, the first repeat was by leading sport climber Adam Ondra.

== Protection ==
=== Equipment ===
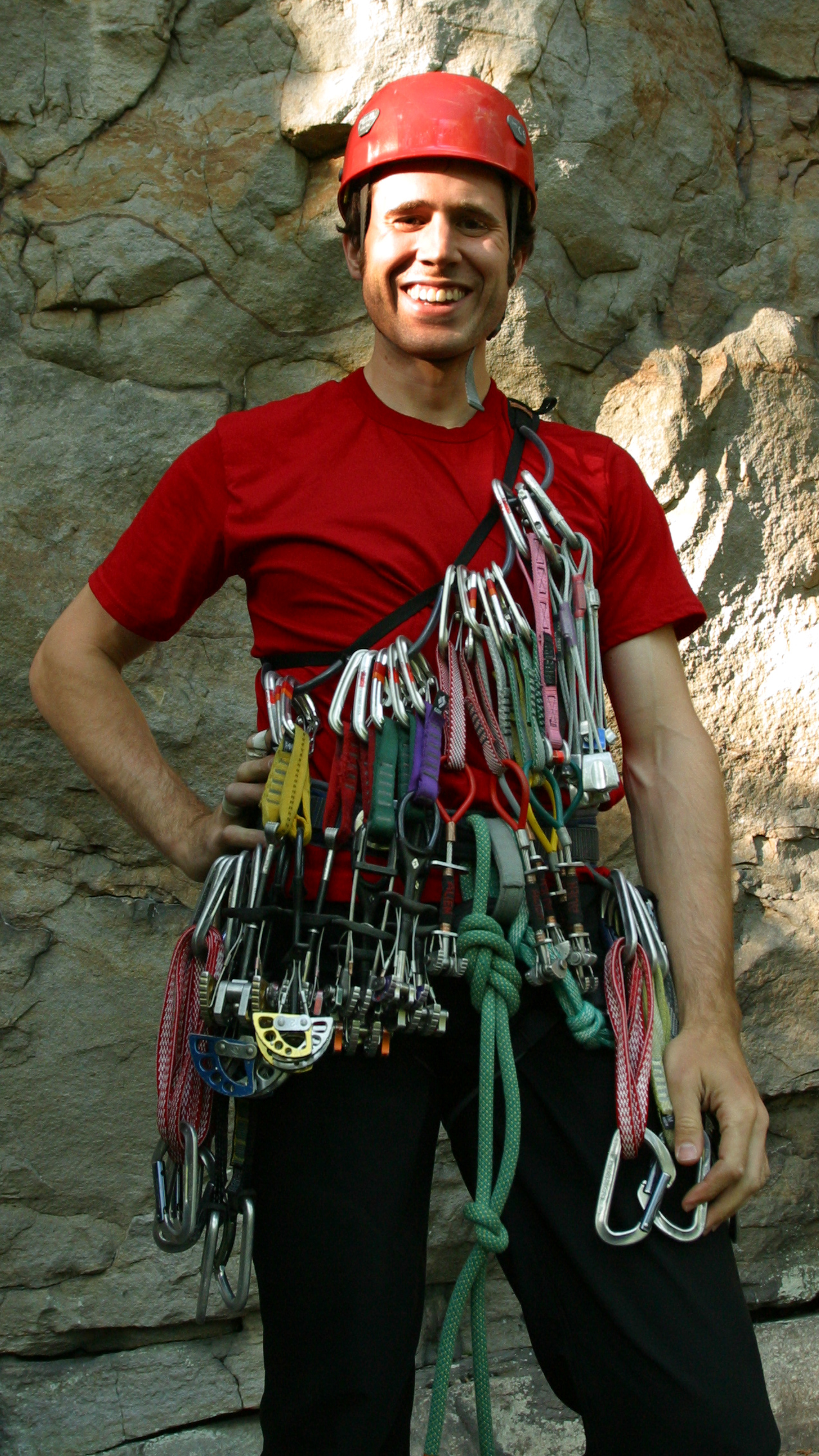
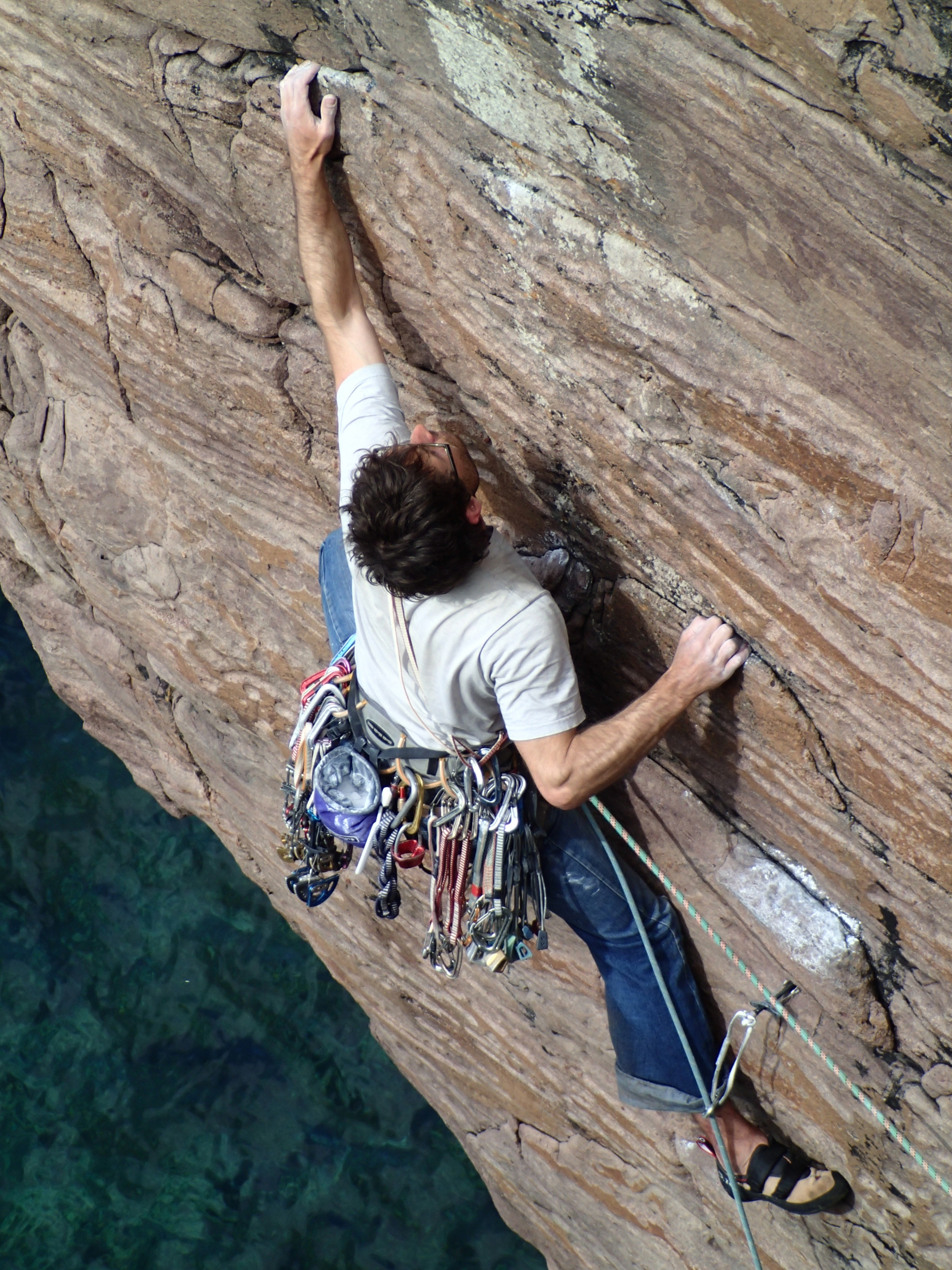
Traditional climbers using various approaches to carrying the extensive protection equipment (or "rack") needed

Traditional climbing requires more rock climbing equipment than sport climbing as the lead climber needs to carry, and insert, protection devices while climbing the route. The choice of equipment carried will depend on the type of route being attempted. Some of the most difficult and dangerous traditional routes (e.g. Indian Face or Master's Edge) offer very little opportunity to insert protection into the rock, and thus the lead climber carries very little protective equipment.

Classic traditional climbs often involve crack climbing (e.g. Separate Reality) that offers greater opportunity for inserting protection – into the crack itself – and the lead climber will carry a lot more equipment to secure their safety.

Two main classes of protection are used in traditional climbing, namely: "passive" and "active". Passive protection devices include nuts, hexcentrics and tricams, and are metal shapes attached to wires or slings, which can be inserted into cracks and fissures in the rock that will act like temporary sport climbing bolts (to which quickdraws and the rope can be clipped into). Active protection consists of spring-loaded camming devices (or "friends"), which are cams that dynamically adjust to the size of the crack or fissure in the rock, but also act like temporary sport climbing bolts.

=== Risk ===
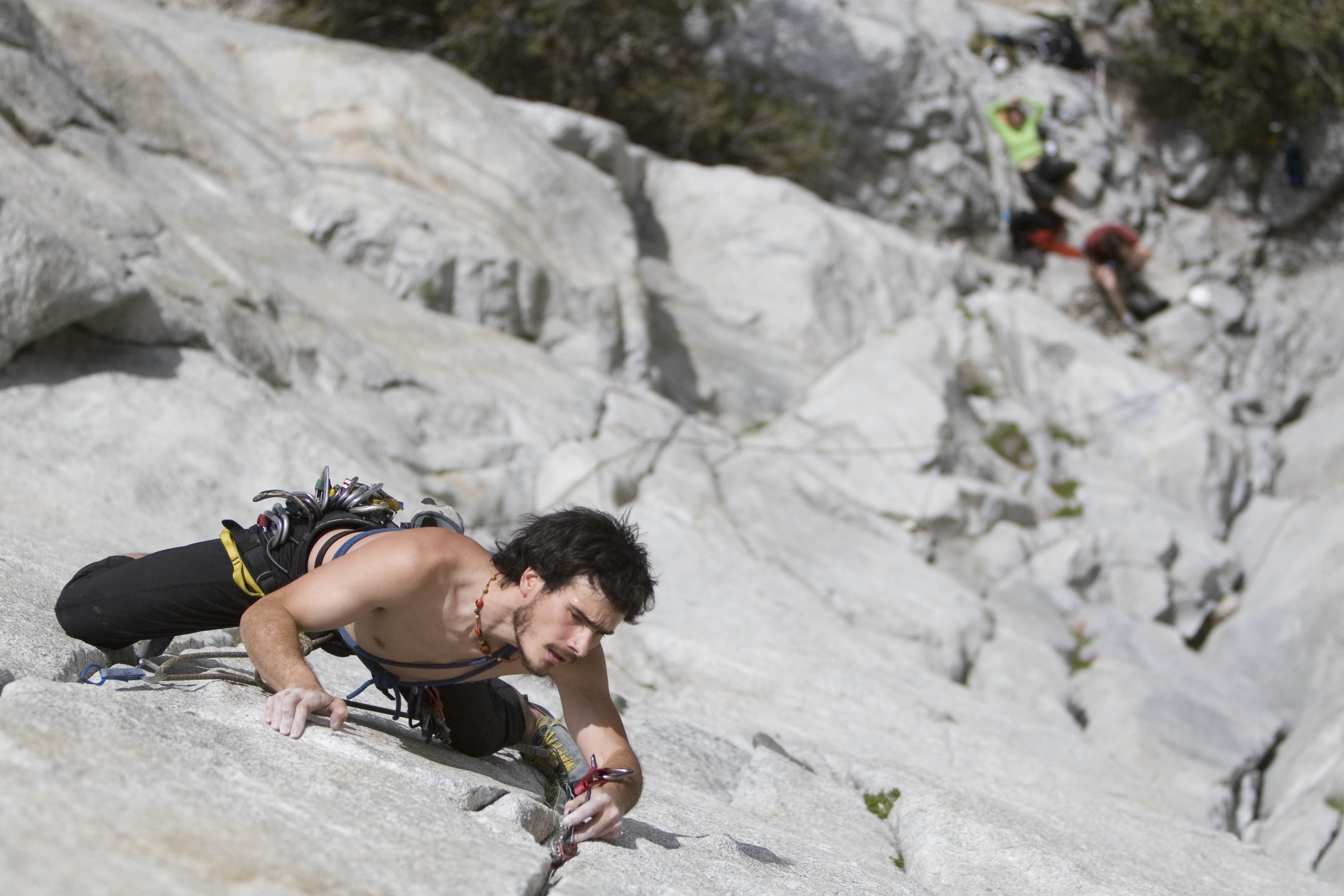
Traditional climber inserting a spring-loaded camming device for their protection while leading Freeblast (5.11b), in Yosemite

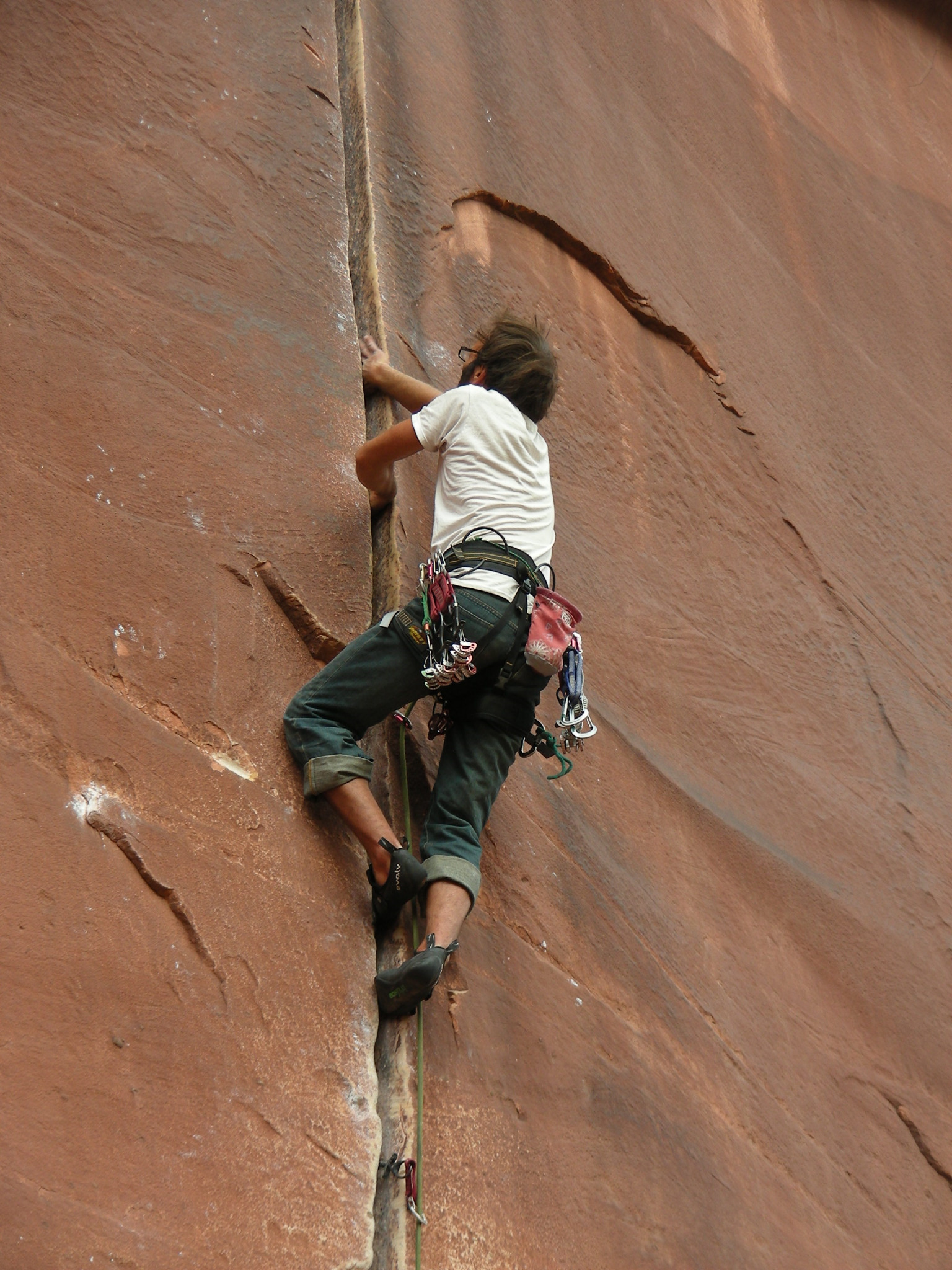
Traditional climber leading Coyne Crack (5.11+), Indian Creek; the crack offers lots of opportunity for inserting climbing protection

The traditional climber has two key concerns, or areas of risk, when placing the protection equipment while leading the traditional route.

The first concern is related to the quality of the protection placements. Where these placements are considered good and will hold the climber in the event of a major fall, they are called "bomb-proof" (i.e. they behave just like pre-drilled bolts). However, when the placements are poor, and there is uncertainty that they will hold in the event of a major fall – risking a "zipper-fall" – they are described as "thin". For example, when Johnny Dawes freed the traditional climb Indian Face (E9 6c) in 1986, the protection was so thin, Dawes assumed if he fell, the protection would rip out, and he would fall to the ground.

The other concern is the distance between the protection placements. Where there are many protection placements with small gaps between them (e.g. 2 to 3 metres), then any fall will be short and less onerous; even if one placement fails/rips-out, there are more placements that might still hold. However, large gaps between placements – known as a "run out" – means that any fall will be larger and will place more pressure on the existing placements to hold the fall. Famous extreme traditional climbs such as Master's Edge (E7 6c) and Gaia (E8 6c) have notorious run-outs, where even if the protection holds, the falling climber has a high chance of hitting the ground, as spectacularly shown in the opening sequence of the 1998 British climbing film, Hard Grit.

To reflect the greater risk of traditional climbing routes over sport climbing routes, an additional grade is often added to the route's grade of technical difficulty (i.e. how hard are the individual moves) to reflect the risks. In the United Kingdom, this is known as the "adjectival" grade (Diff, VDiff, HS, VS, HVS, E1 to E11). In the United States, it takes the form of a suffix (PG – be careful, R – fall will cause injury, R/X – fall will cause serious injury, X – fall likely to be fatal).

== Grading ==
The grading of traditional climbing routes starts with a sport climbing grade for the "technical difficulty", and an additional "risk grade" to reflect how hard the lead climber will find protecting the route while ascending. Some sport grading systems, particularly the French system (e.g. ... 6b, 6c, 7a, 7b, 7c, ...), offer no additional "risk grade", and are thus less likely to be used as traditional climbing grades (but may be quoted alongside one). The most dominant grading system for traditional climbing is the American system (e.g. ... 5.9, 5.10a, 5.10b, 5.10c, 5.10d, 5.11a, ...), which for traditional routes can add the "suffix" of "R" for risk of serious injury in any fall, or "X" for routes where a fall at a particular place, could be fatal (i.e. a "chop route"). For example, a famous but serious extreme North American traditional climb is Sonnie Trotter's 2007 route, The Path in Lake Louise, Alberta, which is graded 5.14a R.

One of the most detailed, and still widely used, traditional grading systems is the British E-grade (e.g. ... VS 4c, HVS 5a, E1 5b, E2 5c, E4 6a, ...). Two grades are quoted; the first being the "adjectival grade", and the second being the "technical grade". The interplay between the two grades reflects the "risk grade" of the route. For each "technical grade", there is a normal equivalent "adjectival grade"; for example, for the technical grade of "6a", the normal "adjectival grade" is "E4". Where the "adjectival grade" is lower than normal, for example, E3 6a (or even E2 6a), that means the route is much safer and easier to protect. When the "adjectival grade" is higher than normal, for example, E5 6a (or even E6 6a), that means the route is more dangerous and harder to protect. For example, one of the most famous and dangerous extreme British traditional climbs is Johnny Dawes' 1986 route, Indian Face, which is graded E9 6c (instead of the normal E7 6c), or 5.13a X under the American system.

== Hardest routes ==
=== Pre sport-climbing era ===
Before the emergence of sport climbing in the early 1980s, almost all new grade milestones in rock climbing were set by traditional climbers. By the end of the 1970s, male traditional climbers were climbing to 5.13a (7c+) with Toni Yaniro's Grand Illusion, while female traditional climbers were climbing to 5.12d (7c), with Lynn Hill on Ophir Broke. During the early 1980s, leading European traditional climbers like Jerry Moffatt and Wolfgang Güllich changed to sport climbing, in which all future new grade milestones would be established. Moffatt's last major traditional FFA was Master's Wall (E7 6b) in 1984, where he said afterward: "At that time to be respected, you really had to be putting up really scary new [traditional] routes. That was where it was at, in Britain at least. Master's Wall is probably where I risked most".

=== Post sport-climbing era ===
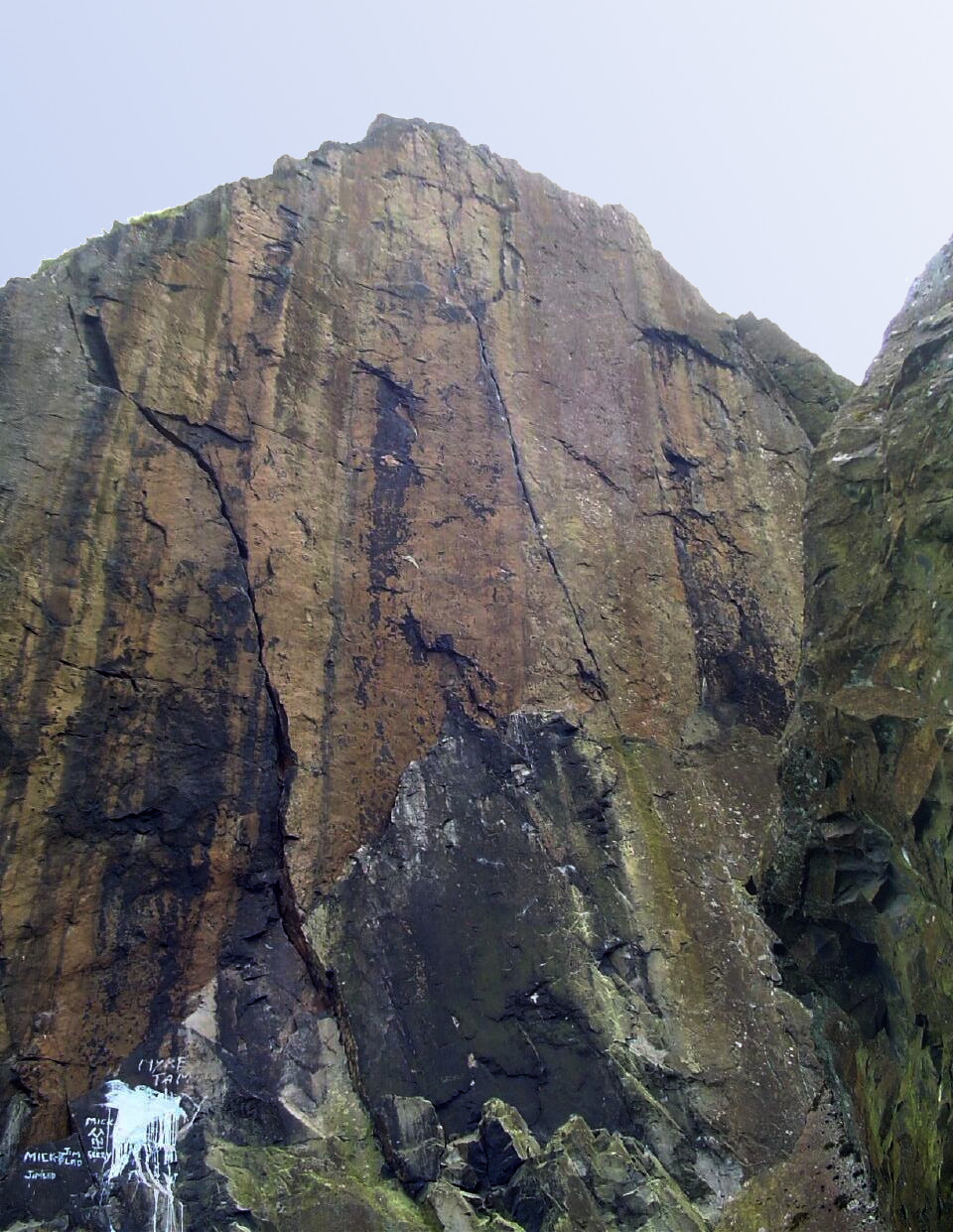
North West face of Dumbarton Rock. Rhapsody and Requiem follow the line of the thin and tallest crack in the centre of the face. Rhapsody holds the line to the top, while Requiem veers right

While the status of traditional climbing waned during the rise of the safer disciplines of sport climbing (and its related sport of competition climbing), and latterly bouldering, contemporary traditional climbers continued to set new grade milestones. As of May 2026, the following traditional climbing routes are considered to be some of the hardest-ever ascended (in increasing order of difficulty):

- Century Crack (E10 7a, 5.14b, 8c) in Canyonlands, Utah, FA by Tom Randall and Pete Whittaker in 2011.
- Cobra Crack (E10 7a, 5.14b, 8c) in Squamish, British Columbia, FA by Sonnie Trotter in 2006.
- Echo Wall (E10 7a, 5.14b, 8c) on Ben Nevis, Scotland, first ascent by Dave MacLeod in 2008.
- Pura Pura (E10 7a, 5.14b/c, 8c/+) in Orco Valley, Italy, FA by Tom Randall in 2014.
- Magic Line (5.14b/c, 8c/+) in Yosemite, pinkpoint by Ron Kauk in 1996, redpoint by Lonnie Kauk in 2018, FFFA by Hazel Findlay in 2019.
- Blackbeard's Tears (E11 7a, 5.14c, 8c+) at Redwood, USA, FFA by Ethan Pringle in 2016.
- Meltdown (E11 7a, 5.14c, 8c+) in Yosemite, USA, FFA (and FFFA) by Beth Rodden in 2008.
- Recovery Drink (E11 7a, 5.14c, 8c+) in Jøssingfjorden, Norway, FA by Nicolas Favresse in 2013.
- Rhapsody (E11 7a, 5.14c R/X, 8c+) in Dumbarton Rock, Scotland, FA by Dave MacLeod in 2006.
- Crown Royale (5.14c/d) in Jøssingfjorden, Norway, FFA by Pete Whittaker in 2023.
- Bon Voyage (5.14d, 9a, E12) in Annot, France, first free ascent (FFA) by James Pearson in 2023; repeated by Adam Ondra in 2024.
- Tribe (5.14d, 9a, E12) in Cardarese, Italy, FFA by Jacopo Larcher in 2019; repeated by James Pearson in 2020.
- Drifter's Escape (proposed 5.15a, 9a+, E12) on the Stawamus Chief in Squamish, FFA by Connor Herson in 2025.

== In film ==
A number of notable films have been made focused on traditional climbing including:

- Hard Grit, a 1998 documentary film about traditional climbing on extreme gritstone routes in the British Peak District
- Valley Uprising, a 2014 Sender Films documentary film about rock climbing in Yosemite that includes traditional climbing

== See also ==
- History of rock climbing
- List of grade milestones in rock climbing
