= Alex Waterhouse =

British rock climber

Personal information
- Born: 9 April 1997 Plymouth, United Kingdom
- Occupation: Professional rock climber
- Spouse: Claire Apuan

Climbing career
- Type of climber: Competition climbing, bouldering, crack climbing
- Highest grade: Redpoint: 9a (5.14d); Bouldering: 8B+ (V14)
- Retired from competition: 2023
- Updated on 11 November 2023

Alex Waterhouse (born 9 April 1997) is a British rock climber, known for competition climbing, where he was a member of the GB climbing team, and also outdoor bouldering and crack climbing, including being a member of the first British lead climbing pair to free climb the big wall climbing route on El Capitan known as The Nose at 5.14a (8b+).

== Competition climbing career ==
Waterhouse began climbing in 2008 at age 11, with the climbing club at Devonport High School for Boys. A few months later he started competing in competition climbing events, and by the age of 14 he joined the GB climbing team and entering European competitions.

He competed in three IFSC Climbing World Youth Championships, in Canada in 2013, and New Caledonia and Italy in 2015. In Italy he competed in the lead, boulder, and speed events, attaining 6th place in the overall world rankings. In the same year he become the UK junior bouldering champion, and captain of the GB junior bouldering team.

In 2015, Waterhouse began studying Computer Science at Dartmouth College in the US, during which he won the US collegiate national championship, and climbed 9a (5.14d) and V14 (8B+) for the first time. He returned to the UK in 2019 to join the GB senior climbing team and compete in the IFSC Climbing World Cup. In 2023, Waterhouse announced his retirement from competition climbing.

== Notable outdoor ascents ==
=== Bouldering ===
- The Kraken V13 (8B), Hartland Quay, Devon, UK. May 2020. The hardest crack boulder problem in the world.
- Never Ending Story 8B+ (V14), Magic Wood, Switzerland. July 2020

=== Lead climbing ===
- The Fly 9a (5.14d), Rumney, New Hampshire, US
- Belly Full of Bad Berries 5.13b (8a) (flash), Indian Creek, Utah, US. The third person to flash the route, after Pete Whittaker and Mari Salvesen.
- The Nose (El Capitan) 5.14a (8b+), Yosemite National Park, California, US. With Billy Ridal to become the first British pair to fully free climb the route.
