= Drifter's Escape (climb) =

Hardest traditional climb in the world

- Location: Squamish, British Columbia, Canada
- Climbing area: Stawamus Chief
- Route type: Traditional climbing; Crack climbing
- Rock type: Granite
- Vertical gain: circa 20 m (65 ft)
- Pitches: 1
- Technical grade: 5.15a (9a+)
- First ascent: Unknown (aid)
- First free ascent: Connor Herson, 14 July 2025
- Known for: First-ever traditional climbing route at 9a+ (5.15a)

Drifter's Escape is a 20-metre (66 ft) long traditional climbing route on the Stawamus Chief in Squamish, British Columbia, Canada. The route follows a series of parallel cracks through a blank headwall of white granite, situated just left of the University Wall (IV 5.12). It constitutes the fifth pitch of the aid route Bald Egos (VI 5.9 A4).

On 14 July 2025, American climber Connor Herson completed the first free ascent of the route, proposing a grade of 5.15a (9a+). A subsequent ascent confirmed Herson's rating, making Drifter's Escape the hardest traditional route in the world.

== History ==
Until 2021, the pitch was an unremarkable section of the largely forgotten aid route Bald Egos. Climber Jon Rigg, who repeated Bald Egos, described the pitch as resembling a "mini shield" of El Capitan's headwall, drawing renewed attention to its potential for free climbing.

Connor Herson, who had been a regular presence at the Stawamus Chief since 2023 and had by that point climbed nearly all of the established 5.14-graded trad routes in Squamish, first inspected the line on rappel. Herson subsequently fixed ropes to the ground and accessed the base of the pitch by toprope soloing two pitches of Wall of Attrition (5.11).

=== First free ascent ===
Herson completed the first free ascent on 14 July 2025, after approximately 20 sessions spread across two summers — the most time he had spent on any trad route. The news was withheld for several months to coincide with a film release. Herson stated: "I didn't even grade it for a few months after climbing it. The time on this route was remarkably fun and positive… I wouldn't trade those days for the world."

The ascent was documented by filmmaker Eric Bissell for Black Diamond Equipment, and incorporated into a four-part video series released in March 2026 under the title Born From the Climbing Life. A director's cut of the first ascent also featured in the Mellow Film Tour, which premiered on 27 February 2026 in Boulder, Colorado.

The route begins with two pre-existing protection bolts that guard a V7 boulder problem at the start of the pitch, before transitioning to traditional gear placements for the remainder of the climb. The presence of these bolts has prompted debate within the climbing community over whether Drifter's Escape qualifies as a traditional climb. Herson has not claimed a strictly traditional ascent, stating: "I don't want to make a pedantic argument of what constitutes 'trad.' I'm not claiming a 'trad' ascent, and the grade is just a proposal."

== Route ==
The pitch begins with two bolts protecting a V7 boulder problem into the crack features that define the upper route. Insecure 5.13 laybacking with tension-dependent feet follows, leading to a heel hook rest stance. The first crux, estimated at V11, centres on a "pogo"-style move involving a dynamic right-hand bump generated by swinging the right leg, protected by a 0.1/0.2 offset cam. After the first crux, two solid fingerlocks provide brief respite before a sustained section of 5.13 climbing up twin cracks. The second crux, also estimated at V11, involves a technically demanding combination of a two-finger side-pull with the left hand and a slippery fingerlock with the right. The pitch concludes with a mantel onto a sloping ledge with anchors. The rack consists of approximately ten pieces, the majority 0.2-cam sized or smaller.

== Significance ==
At the time of its first free ascent, Drifter's Escape was proposed as the first traditionally protected route of grade 5.15a (9a+).

It sits alongside the hardest traditionally protected climbs in the world, including James Pearson's Bon Voyage E12 9a (5.14d) in Annot, France; William Moss's The Best Things In Life Are Free (5.14d R) in the Gunks, New York; Pete Whittaker's Crown Royale (5.14c/d) on Norway's Profile Wall; and Jacopo Larcher's Tribe (ungraded) in Cadarese, Italy.

== Ascents ==
- 1st (as an aid climbing route). Unknown. As a 5.9 A3-graded aid route.
- 1st (as a free climbing route). Connor Herson. July 2025.
- 2nd free ascent. Pietro Vidi. October 2026.

== See also ==
- Cobra Crack, one of the first traditional climbs at grade 8c (5.14b)
- Rhapsody (climb), first-ever traditional climb at grade 8c+ (5.14c)
- History of rock climbing
