= The Kraken (climb) =

Crack boulder in England

- Location within Devon
- Location: Hartland Quay, Devon, England
- Coordinates: 50°59′40″N 4°32′01″W
- Route type: Crack bouldering
- NCCS grade: V13 (8B)
- First ascent: Tom Randall

The Kraken is a 40ft horizontal roof crack boulder, in Devon, England, claimed to be the hardest crack boulder in the world. Tom Randall made the first free ascent of the boulder in August 2015, giving it a grade of V13 (8B).

== Sequence ==
The boulder is set in a sea cave on the shore of Devon. Timing an ascent is difficult, because the sea washes into the cave every day, coating the rock in salty gunk, and the wind and weather conditions have to be ideal for an ascent.

The problem starts at the back of the cave, in a crack in the roof. The first section is a sequence of good hand and foot jams, followed by a harder section with a long move between good jams, and then a finger jam and a mono.

The crux of the move requires backhanding a mono, allowing you to spin your feet around to jam them into a perpendicular crack, pointing out of the cave.

The perpendicular part of the roof crack is done feet-first, through a section with thin hand jams, and a ring lock in the roof. The final section of roof crack consists of thin hand jams and monos, which are easy to fall off if the climber makes a mistake.

Once they have reached the edge of the cave, the climber finishes by climbing over a lip, and grabbing a ledge for the top.

Randall said of the climb "I don't have any doubts about it being the hardest crack boulder problem in the world, at all."

== Free ascents ==
- Tom Randall, August 2015, first
- Alex Waterhouse, May 2020, second
- Pete Whittaker, July 2022, third
