= Didier Berthod =

Swiss rock climber and priest

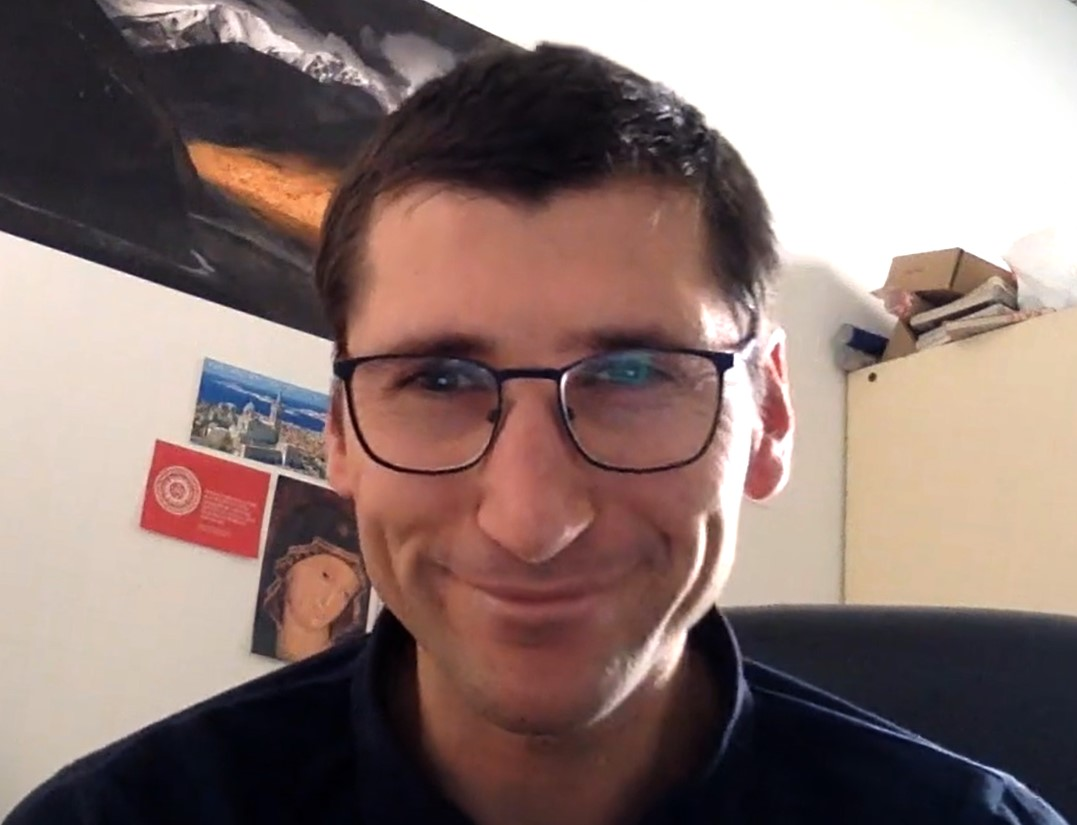
- Berthod gives a homily in 2020

Personal information
- Born: 1981 (age 44–45) Bramois, Valais, Switzerland
- Occupations: Rock climber, priest

Climbing career
- Type of climber: Sport climbing; Traditional climbing
- First ascents: Greenspit (8b+, 2003); Crack of Destiny (5.14b/c, 2023)
- Known for: FFAs of hard traditional routes; Attempts on Cobra Crack
- Updated on 16 September 2023

Didier Berthod (born 1981) is a Swiss rock climber and priest. He specializes in traditional climbing, and crack climbing in particular.

== Climbing career ==
In 2003, Berthod came to international prominence when he pinkpointed the unfinished sport climbing route Greenspit 8b+ (5.14a) in the Orco Valley in Italy, as a traditional climbing route. Converting a sport route to a traditional route is known as "greenpointing" (although the route's name came from its green colored sport bolts). In 2005, Berthold returned to do the route without any pre-placed protection, and Greenspit was recognized as one of the hardest traditional crack climbs in the world.

Berthod then made trips to America where he put up new traditional climbing routes such as Learning to Fly and From Switzerland with Love, both at grade 5.13+ in Indian Creek in Utah.

The 2006 cult climbing film First Ascent, followed Berthod's unsuccessful efforts to make the first free ascent of Cobra Crack, a 5.14b (8c)-graded traditional climbing route in Squamish, British Columbia, Canada; which was at the time considered the world's hardest traditional crack climb (it was later free climbed by Sonnie Trotter). The film also documented Berthod’s other climbs in Europe (including Greenpoint), and his frugal lifestyle such as working in a hostel between attempts.

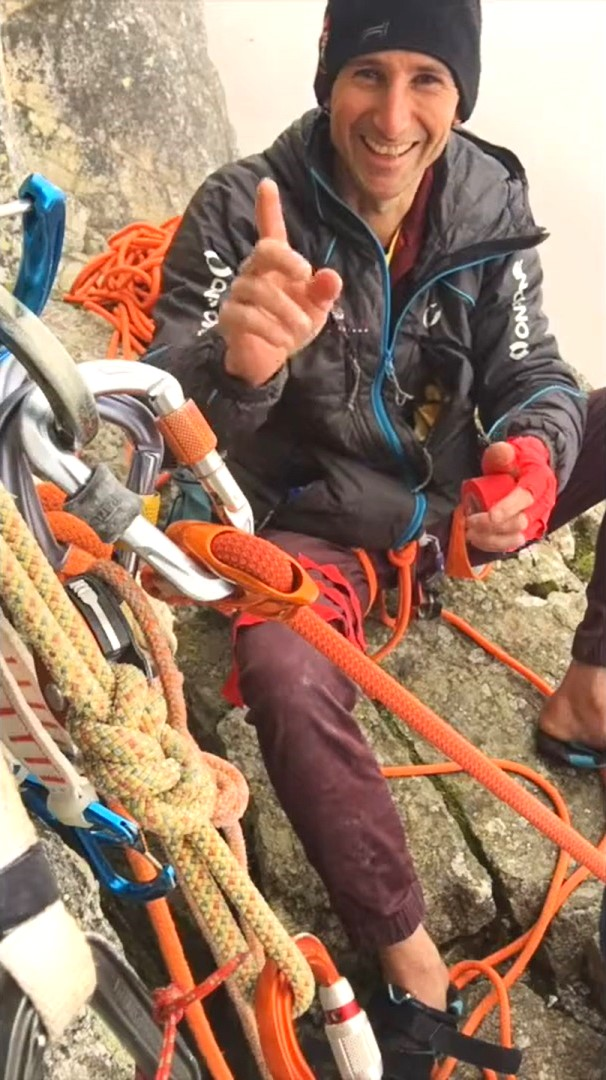
Berthod teaches how to make a tape glove for crack climbing in 2021

After quitting climbing for over a decade, Berthod returned to international climbing attention in June 2023, when he went back to Squamish where he completed the first pinkpoint of a long-standing open project called The Crack of Destiny that he graded as being harder than 5.14a (8b+). In May 2024, Berthod returned to Cobra Crack to make the 20th ascent of the route saying "It is more so the end of a book, than a chapter".

== Religious life ==
After completing First Ascent, Berthod, then aged 25 and carrying a serious knee injury, decided to completely abandon rock climbing and joined Nicolas Buttet's Franciscan-community, the Eucharistein fraternity, in Saint-Maurice, Switzerland (close to where Berthod was born), as a monk. In 2016, Berthod was ordained as a priest, and shortly afterward began climbing again.

In a 2018 documentary on Berthod called Fissure, he explained his reasons for leaving climbing: "I felt like a junkie, someone who craved a daily dose of climbing. If I didn't get it, I got angry. I hated that feeling because it kept me from being truly free. I needed to be free, and that’s what my faith gave me – that and spiritual healing". On his return to climbing, he told German TV: "In recent years I quit this [monastic] way of being Christian and I embraced a way more humanistic way of being Christian". By 2020, Berthod had completed a new 8c (5.14b) bolted route on Petit Clocher du Portalet.

== Filmography ==
- Documentary featuring Berthod on Cobra Crack in Squamish, British Columbia: Peter Mortimer (2006). First Ascent (Motion picture). Sender Films.
- Documentary on Berthod: Christophe Margot (2018). Fissure (Motion picture). Cine Margot.

== See also ==
- Dave MacLeod, Scottish traditional climber
