= Tom Randall (climber) =

British rock climber

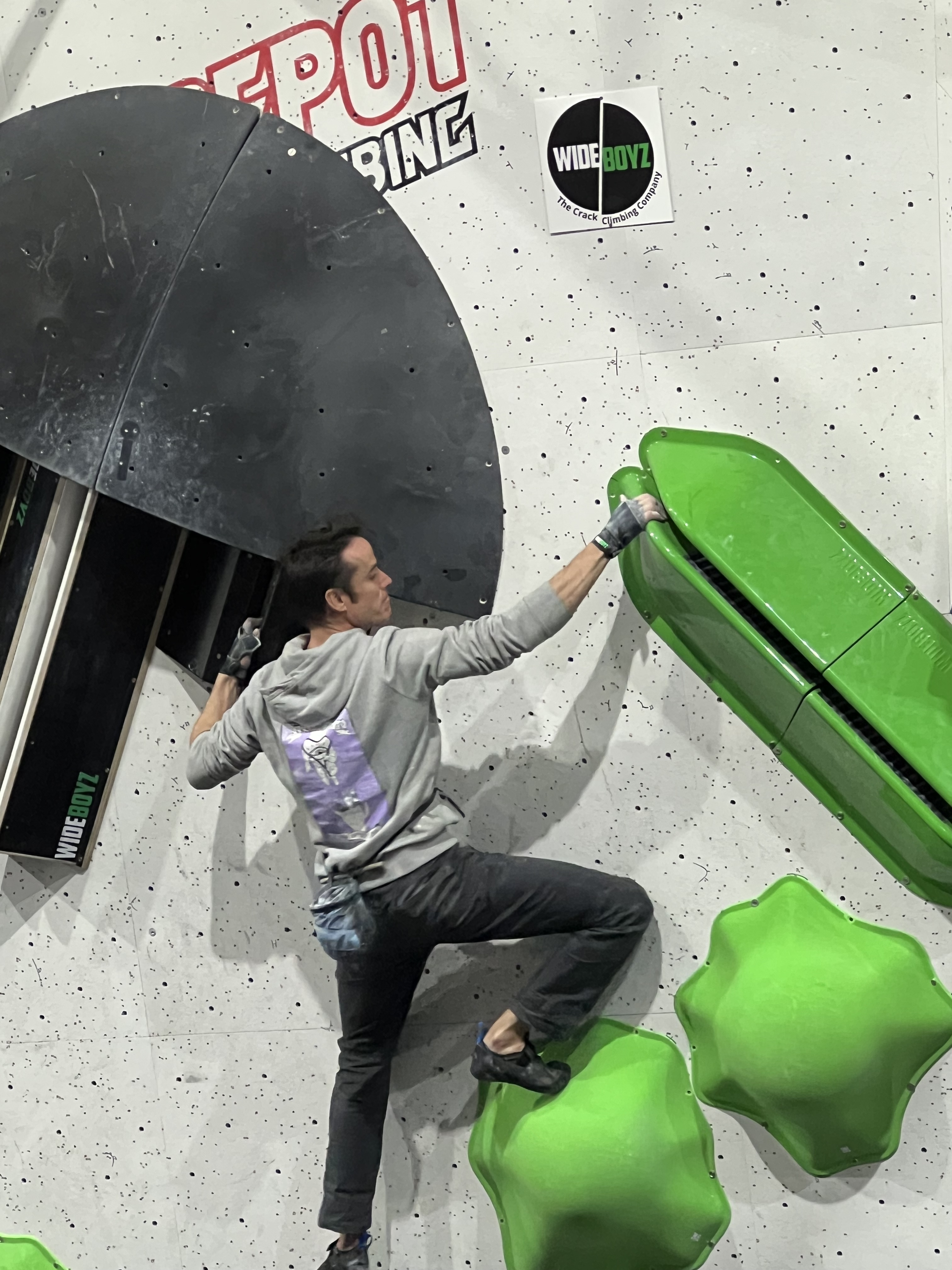
- Tom Randall at CrackFest 2024, Sheffield, UK

Personal information
- Born: South Africa
- Occupation: Professional rock climber
- Height: 178 cm (5 ft 10 in)

Climbing career
- Type of climber: Traditional climbing, crack climbing
- Highest grade: Redpoint: 8c (5.14b)/8c+ (5.14c); Bouldering: V13 (8B)
- First ascents: Autobahn (5.14b/c); Century Crack (5.14b); Pura Pura (5.14b); Black Mamba (5.14b); The Kraken (V13)
- Major ascents: Cobra Crack (5.14b)
- Known for: First ascents of Century Crack, Autobahn, and The Kraken, some of the world's hardest crack climbs. One of the Wide Boyz duo. Co-founder of Lattice Training.
- Updated on 24 February 2026

Tom Randall is a British professional rock climber. Randall and his climbing partner Pete Whittaker, known as the Wide Boyz, are considered two of the best crack climbers in the world. They are best known for the first free ascent of Century Crack (8c/5.14b) in 2011. They also produce crack climbing social media content, training material, and specialized equipment. Randall is also co-founder of Lattice Training, a climbing coaching company.

== Climbing career ==
In 2011, alongside climbing partner Pete Whittaker, Randall made the first free ascent of Century Crack (8c/5.14b), then considered the world's hardest offwidth crack climb. Prior to the attempt, they had trained for two years on a wooden replica of the crack in Randall's home's cellar.

In 2015, Randall made the first ascent of boulder problem The Kraken, a 40-foot horizontal roof crack in Hartland Quay, Devon, England. He proposed a grade of 8B (V13), making it one of the hardest crack boulders in the world.

Over the years, Randall has established many new trad routes in England's Peak District. He and Whittaker have also jointly established many routes, particularly in Canyonlands National Park, Utah. They won Climbing magazine's 2016 Golden Piton Vision Award for their climbing in this region, particularly their first ascent of The Millennium Arch.

In 2021, Randall and Whittaker made the first free ascent of The Great Rift, a 2,500-foot horizontal roof crack on the underside of an M5 motorway bridge over the River Exe in Devon, England, with pitches ranging from 7b+ (5.12c) to 8a+ (5.13c). The climb was documented in the short film Bridge Boys, which featured in Reel Rock 16.

In 2025, Randall made the first ascent, via free solo, of Autobahn, a 200-foot horizontal roof crack on the underside of a road bridge in Oranienburg, Germany. Considering it harder than Century Crack, he proposed a grade of 8c/8c+ (5.14b/c), making it the world's hardest offwidth. The route was repeated in August 2026 by Mary Eden who had also previously climbed Century Crack. She described it as easier than Century Crack and suggested a grade of 5.14a.

== Notable Ascents ==
=== Traditional climbing ===
- Autobahn – 8c/8c+ (5.14b/c) – Oranienburg (DEU) – Nov 2025 – First ascent, First free solo
- Century Crack – 8c (5.14b) – Canyonlands (US) – Nov 2011 – First free ascent, with Pete Whittaker
- Pura Pura (link-up of Greenshadow and Greenspit) – 8c (5.14b) – Orco Valley (ITA) – 2014 – First ascent
- Black Mamba – 8c (5.14b) – Canyonlands (US) – Apr 2019 – First ascent, with Pete Whittaker
- Cobra Crack – 8c (5.14b) – Squamish (CAN) – Sep 2013 – Ninth ascent
- Dina Crac – 8b+ (5.14a) (E9 7a) – Dinas Rock (UK) – Aug 2014 – First free ascent
- Crown of Thorns – 8b+ (5.14a) – Canyonlands (US) – 2016 – First ascent, with Pete Whittaker
- The Millennium Arch – 8b+ (5.14a) – Canyonlands (US) – Oct 2016 – First ascent (pre-placed gear), with Pete Whittaker
- Necronomicon – 8b+ (5.14a) – Canyonlands (US) – Apr 2019 – Second ascent, with Pete Whittaker
- Captain Invincible – 8b/8b+ (5.13d/5.14a) (E9 7a) – Burbage Rocks (UK) – Feb 2014 – Third ascent
- La Fuerza de la Gravedad – 8b/8b+ (5.13d/5.14a) – Vadiello (ESP) – Dec 2022 – Third ascent
- The Final Round – 8a+ (5.13c) (E9 6c) – Dovedale (UK) – Sep 2015 – First ascent
- Pure Now – 8a (5.13b) (E9 6c) – Millstone Edge (UK) – Mar 2014 – First ascent
- The Cleaver – 8a (5.13b) – Day Canyon (US) – Nov 2023 – Second ascent
- The Great Rift (multi-pitch) – 7b+/8a+ (5.13) – Devon (UK) – Nov 2021 – First ascent, alternating leads with Pete Whittaker

=== Bouldering ===
- The Kraken – V13 (8B) – Hartland Quay (UK) – Aug 2015 – First ascent
- Orange Piranha – V12 (8A+) – Rocklands (ZAF) – Jun 2025 – Third ascent

== Wide Boyz ==
Randall and his climbing partner Pete Whittaker are together known as the Wide Boyz. Under this name, they produce social media content on YouTube and other platforms and host an annual crack climbing competition known as Crack Fest. They also offer training in crack climbing and produce specialized equipment like crack volume holds and crack gloves.

== Lattice Training ==
Alongside Ollie Torr, Randall is co-founder and coach for Lattice Training, a climbing coaching company. Specializing in a data-driven approach, Lattice provides coaching through both private training plans and social media content such as YouTube videos. They have supported elite climbers, including Will Bosi in his second ascent of one of the world's hardest boulder problems, Burden of Dreams (V17).

== Filmography ==
- Wide Boyz (2012), directed by Chris Alstrin and Paul Diffley – Documentary film on the first ascent of Century Crack
- Wide Boyz II – Slender Gentlemen (2014), directed by Paul Diffley – Documentary film on the repeat ascent of Cobra Crack
- Bridge Boys (2022), directed by Peter Mortimer and Nick Rosen – Documentary film on the first ascent of The Great Rift
