= Century Crack =

Crack rock climb in Utah

- Location within Utah
- Location: Canyonlands National Park, Utah
- Coordinates: 38°28′22″N 109°52′04″W
- Climbing area: White Rim Sandstone
- Route type: Crack climbing; Traditional climbing
- Rock type: Sandstone
- Vertical gain: 40-metre (130 ft)
- Pitches: 1
- Technical grade: 5.14b (8c)
- First ascent: Steve Bartlett, 2001
- First free ascent: Pete Whittaker and Tom Randall, 2011
- First female free ascent: Mary Catherine Eden, 2025

Century Crack is 40-metre (130 ft) long traditional climbing offwidth crack-climb in the White Rim Sandstone area of Canyonlands National Park, Utah, graded at 5.14b (8c). At the time of its first free ascent, it was one of the technically hardest, and longest, offwidth crack climbs in the world. The first aided ascent of the climbing route was done by Steve Bartlett in 2001, and the first free ascents were by crack climbers, Pete Whittaker and Tom Randall, in 2011.

== History ==
Century Crack was discovered by Steve Bartlett, who completed the first aid climb of the route in 2001, giving it the name Chocolate Starfish.

The first free climb of the route was completed in 2011 by Pete Whittaker and Tom Randall, and is documented in the movie Wide Boyz. They initially climbed it with pre-placed gear, which is called a pinkpoint in climbing, but returned two weeks later to repeat the climb while simultaneously placing the protection gear, per a normal redpoint.

To train for the route, Randall built a replica of the crack in his cellar, where both climbers trained by doing continuous laps. They also did thousands of hours of offwidth-specific training, training an average of 5 days a week for two years.

== Route ==
Century Crack starts with an 85-foot (26 m) roof-crack, that requires the climber to hang upside-down, making progress with various jams throughout the crack's varying widths. It requires a mix of hand jams, hand-fist stacks, fist jams, and various other offwidth techniques.

The first 15-foot (4.6 m) of the crack is small enough for straightforward hand jams. This is followed by the offwidth crux section, wide enough for No. 6 cams, and the rest of the horizontal section fits No. 5 cams.

The crux of the climb is where the crack transitions into a 45-degree overhang, requiring the climber to flip from their inverted position to an upright position. The top-out has the climber squeeze between two outcrops of rock onto the plain above.

== Ascents ==
- 1st (as an aid climbing route). Steve Bartlett, 2001
- 1st Pete Whittaker, 2011
- 2nd Tom Randall, 2011
- 3rd Danny Parker, 2018
- 4th Fumiya Nakamura, 2023
- 5th Mary Catherine Eden, 2025
- 6th Sam Macllwaine, 2026

== See also ==
- Cobra Crack, traditional crack-climbing route in Canada
- Rhapsody (climb), traditional crack-climbing route in Scotland
