= Self-locking device =

Type of climbing equipment

Self-locking devices are pieces of rock-climbing equipment intended to arrest the fall of solo climbers who climb without partners. This device is used for rope solo climbing, for "ground-up climbing", and for "top rope solo climbing". To date, several types of self-locking devices have evolved.

== Types ==
=== Prusik sling ===
The earliest type of self-belay device used was the ubiquitous prusik knotted sling used by climbers. The method requires the solo climber to feed out an estimated length of belay rope so that they can reach their next stance and repeat the process as the rope is difficult to feed through the prusik knot while climbing.

=== Gibbs-style type 1 ascender ===
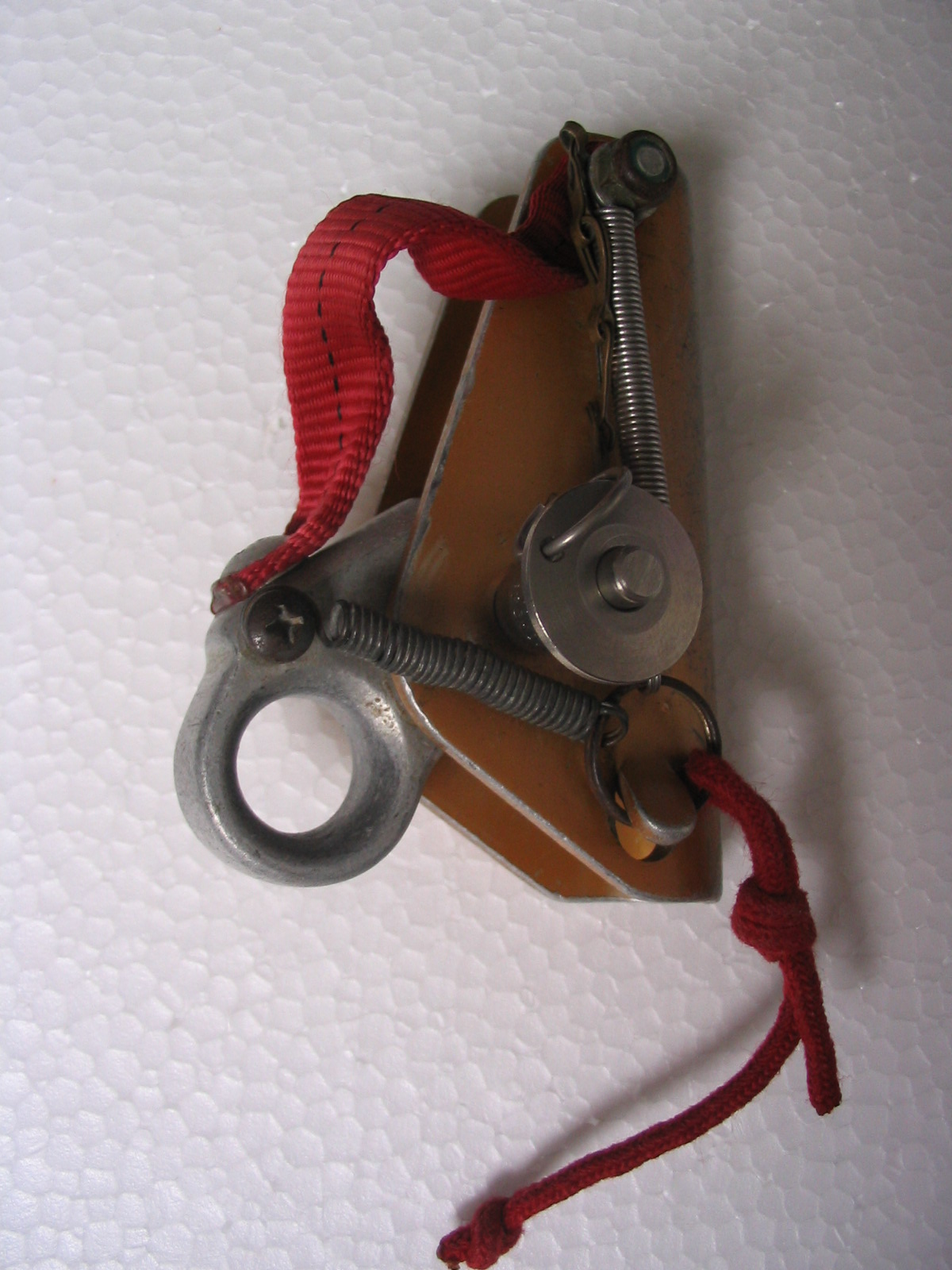
A Gibbs-style ascender

The next level of device development improved on the locking limitations of the prusik sling by utilizing a cam that is activated by the climber's body moving down to rotate the simple grab cam inside a rigid frame. The climber's harness is directly attached to the cam and the frame encapsulates the rope.

Early versions of the cam systems used a Gibbs-style type 1 ascender placed in an inverted position attached to a soloer's sit harness opposite to the manufacturer's intended use. The combination of a climber's body position in a fall and friction between the ascender frame and the rope provides the activating leverage for the cam to grab the rope. Fall forces generated using this device and the cam profile can be enough to damage a rope due to the high clamp loads induced by the cam lever arm. The main drawback to this system is that it is like the prusik knot system where the soloer also has to feed out an estimated amount of rope in order to reach a stance point.

=== Floating cam ascender ===
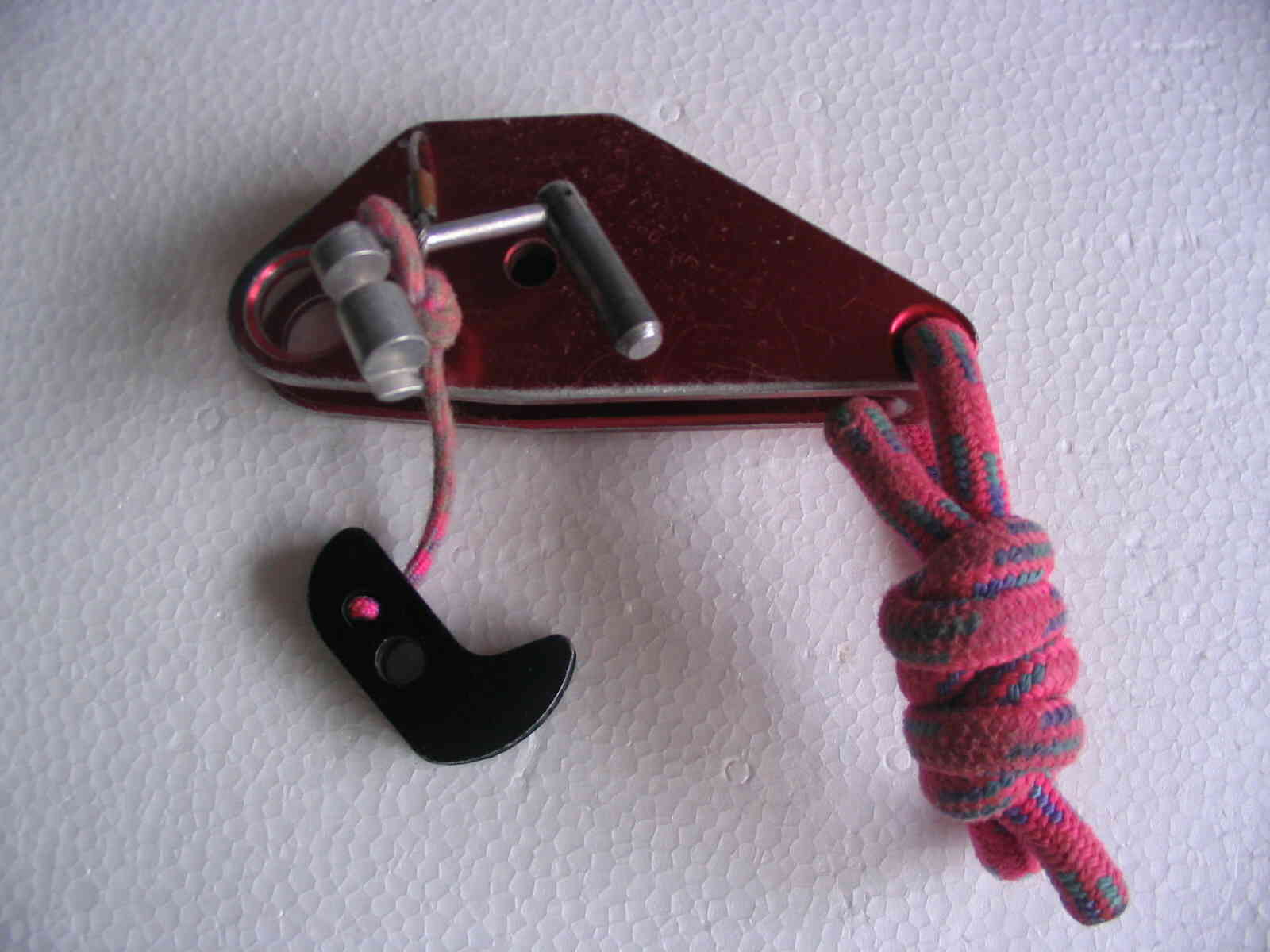
The Wren Industries 'Soloist'

A big improvement over the Gibbs-style type 1 ascender was the design of the Wren Industries "Soloist" – the device incorporates a floating cam that is activated by the relative position of the rope to the device frame, with the frame secured between a user's sit harness and a chest harness. The Soloist allows the rope to feed without the need for the soloer to manually feed out between stances – so it allows a 'true' hands-free climb.

Knowledge of the correct device position relative to the rope anchor is critical for the correct operation of the cam devices in a fall as they are mono-directional in operation, and the soloer must be aware that he needs to put in a runner as soon as he sets off above the belay point on a multi-pitch climb, otherwise he can slide to the bottom of the rope in the event of a fall. The Soloist cam profile design allows the belay rope to be "grasped" rather than crushed as in the early cam devices.

=== Inertial drum brake ascender ===
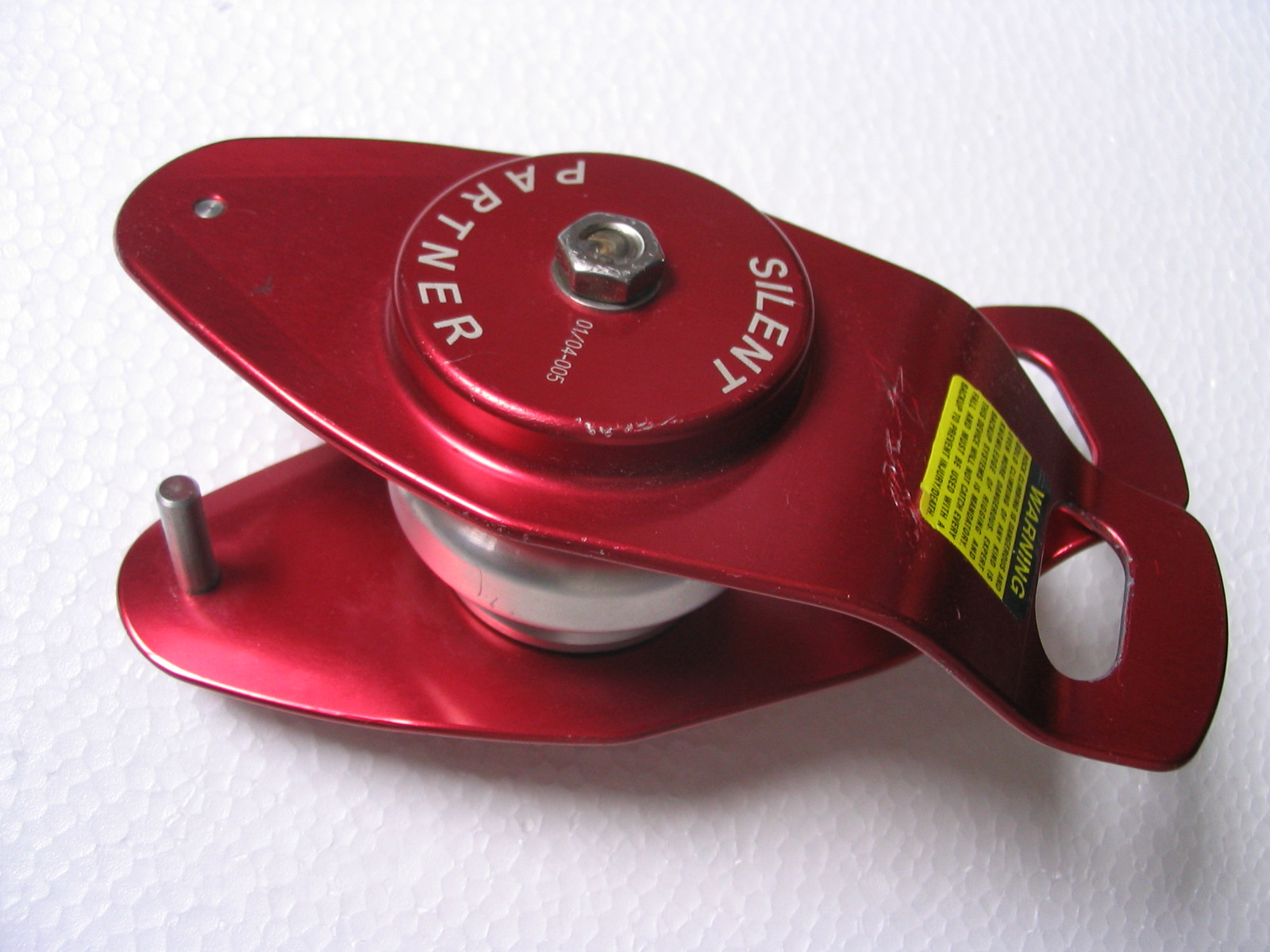
The Wren Industries 'Silent Partner'

To overcome these limitations, the Wren Industries 'Silent Partner' device was developed. This system has four mechanical moving parts inside a frame that is attached to a climber's sit harness and is basically an inertial drum brake with the belay rope connected to the device by tying a clove hitch around the device's drum. The Silent Partner is unique in the sense that it operates in both directions of drum rotation so it can be attached to a climber's sit harness in either position, eliminating the danger of stepping off a multi-pitch anchor point before the first runner can be placed.

Illustration of a clove hitch over the 'Silent Partner'

As long as the clove hitch can feed over the drum, the rope will feed through the device. In a fall, the drum is back driven by the rope as the device slides down the rope; when the drum rotation exceeds a certain angular velocity, it locks off to the frame and the increase in friction induced between the stationary drum and the rope causes the clove hitch to rapidly tighten around the locked drum to arrest the fall.

The method used to lock the drum against the device frame is by the use of two straight knurl edge discs that are thrown outwards by centrifugal force as they ride on parallel ramps milled into the drum's enclosed outer periphery. Two light return springs act as centrifugal force trips and as return springs to reset the discs when the fall load is released and the device is unlocked. A simple nylon guide is used to ensure both discs activate simultaneously to jam the discs between each drum ramp and the frame's lock ring.

While the device works quite well, it suffers from rope drag that can prematurely tighten the clove hitch, so allowance must be made to reduce the hanging weight of the rope below the device. The rope diameter and elasticity is critical for operation, as higher than normal fall forces can be generated due to the rapid locking rate, in the order of 13 kN at runners and anchor points.
