= GriGri =

Assisted braking belay device

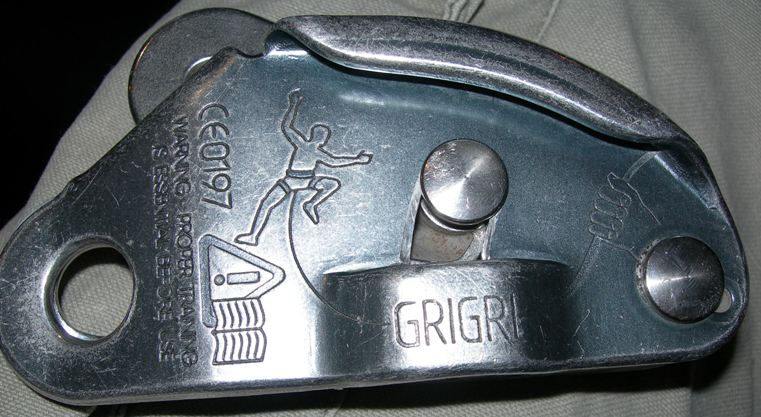
The first-generation Grigri

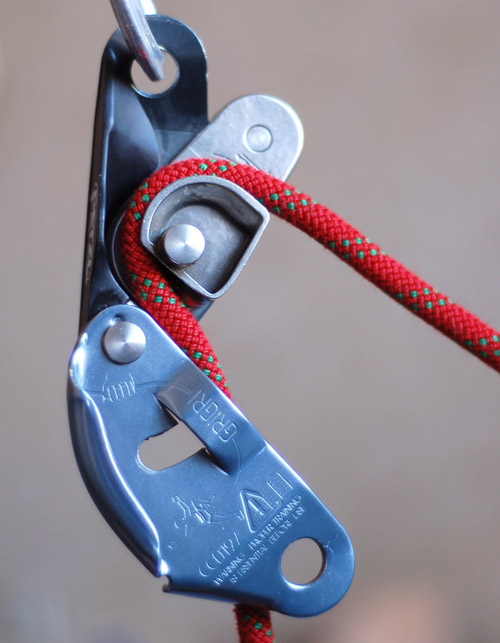
An open first-generation Grigri

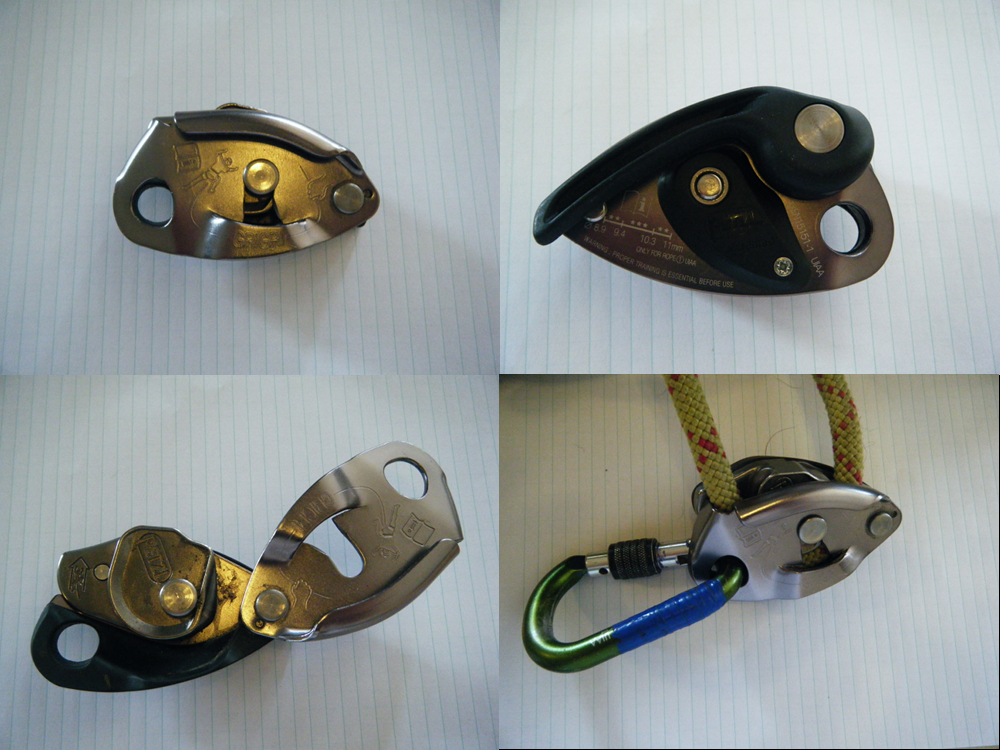
The Grigri 2, released early 2011

A Grigri (styled as GriGri or GRIGRI) is an assisted braking belay device manufactured by Petzl designed to help secure rock-climbing, rappelling, and rope-acrobatic activities. Its main characteristic is a clutch that assists in braking under a shock load. The success of this device has led to grigri becoming a common name for devices of this type. In 2011 a new version, the Grigri 2, was released to replace the original 1991 model. Petzl released the Grigri+ in 2017, adding new safety features to the original design. However this made the device heavier and many climbers felt the new safety features (specifically the anti panic handle which stopped the device from lowering when the handle was pulled too far back) got in the way of normal operation when lowering. 2019 saw the release of an updated version of the device, simply called the Grigri. It is named for the African amulet gris-gris, believed to protect the wearer from evil.

== Mechanism of operation ==
The Grigri is a belay device. It works by generating a pinching force from the force imparted to the device's live end. When a sufficient force is applied to the live end such as in a fall, the device locks up and prevents an uncontrolled fall. This function distinguishes it from traditional belay devices such as a Sticht plate or an ATC, whose braking mechanisms depend entirely on the user controlling the rope in a specific manner to increase or decrease friction. Inside the Grigri, the rope runs along a disc cam; the cam allows the rope to pass if moving slowly enough in order to not generate a drag force over the device's threshold.

Because some force needs to be present in the live end of the rope in order for the device to work as intended, it is very important for the belayer to keep a grip on the brake end at all times. This ensures there is always enough seed tension in the rope for the device to work correctly. In other words, the Grigri also has a user dependent braking mechanism.

== Uses ==
Petzl recommends the device for lead belaying and top-rope belaying, according to EN 15151 standard.

When used correctly, the Grigri's camming mechanism can assist in holding a climber that is working a route, or hanging on the rope while trying to figure out a climb. When belaying, the same technique for "taking in" that is used with an ATC or similar device is used. While paying slack out into the system, if the device is held open by pressing on the cam and the climber falls, the device will lock as long as the belayer is holding the brake strand. However, the device will not lock should the belayer let go of the brake strand while holding the cam in the open position.

Each generation of the GriGri has a lower limit for the rope diameter for which the cam will engage, and an upper limit for maximum rope diameter to allow for feeding.

- The original Grigri is stamped MIN 10 MAX 11.

- The manufacturer recommends the GriGri 2 to be used only with 8.9 to 11 mm diameter ropes.

- Grigri+ and Grigri (2019) expand that lower range to be used with 8.5 to 11mm diameter ropes, with the 'sweet spot' being 8.9 to 10.5mm.

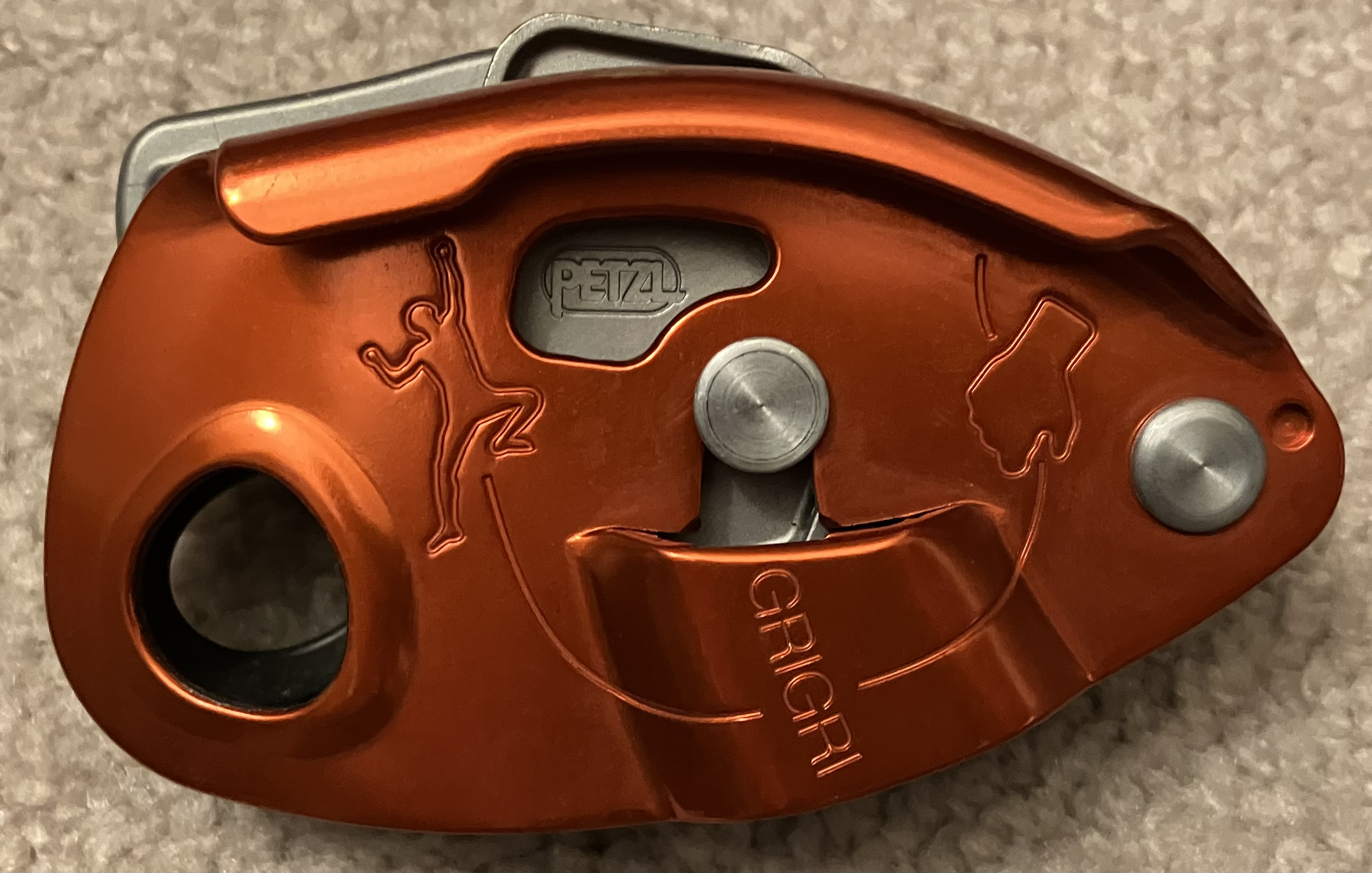
Red GriGri front side, edition circa 2022–2023

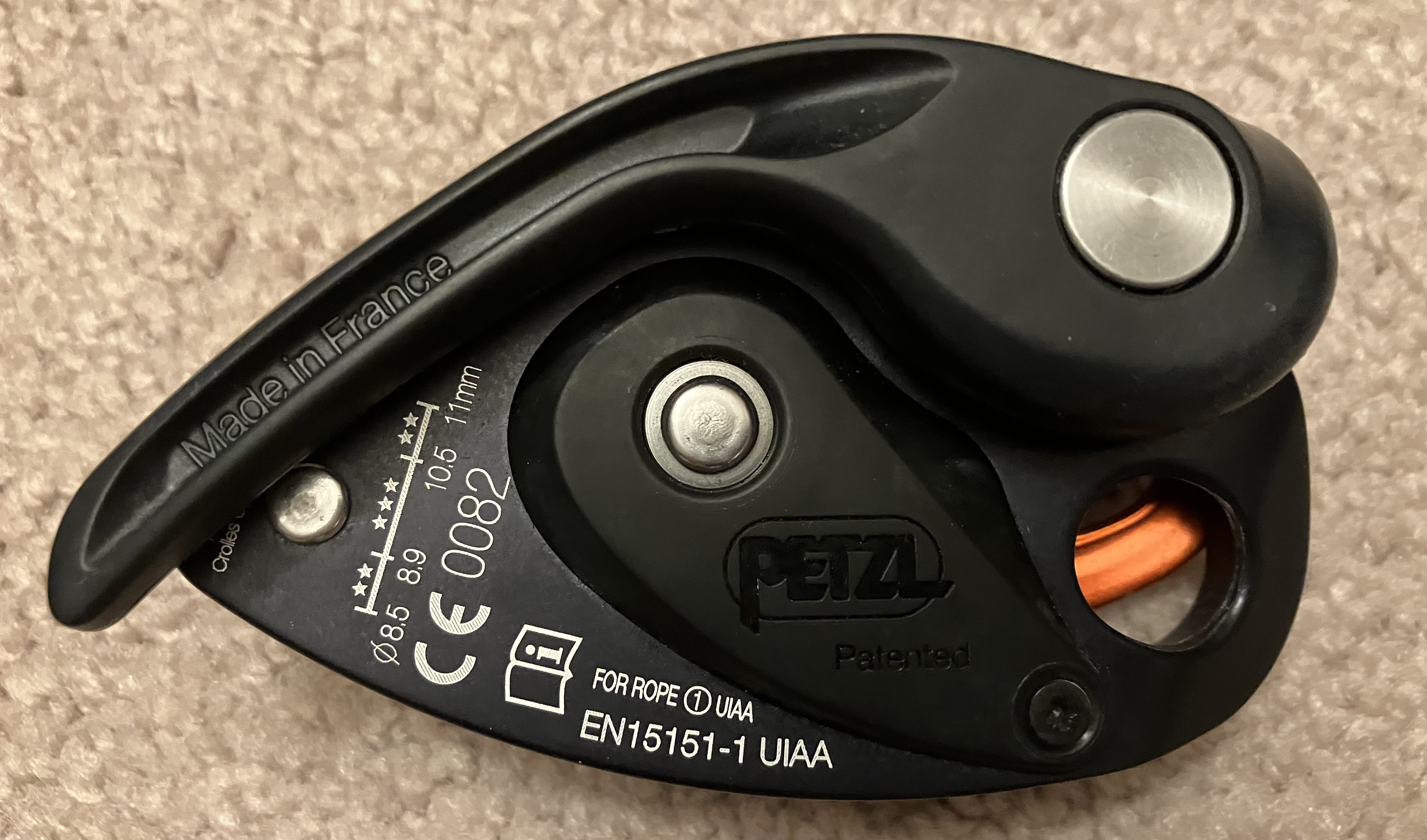
Back side of GriGri edition circa 2022–2023

== Limitations, prohibitions ==
The Grigri has just one place for installing rope and it cannot be used in climbing with half rope.

This device is not suitable for left-handed belay technique. There is a sharp edge on the side that will fray rope if used left-handed, but a smooth flange to protect the rope while belaying right-handed. However, there are special techniques that allow left-handed belayers to use this device, like reorienting it to face the other way.

Some big wall climbers such as those climbing Yosemite's Half Dome or El Capitan have "invented" novel ways to extend its use and compromise its safety. For example, some rope soloists use the Grigri sometimes slightly modified as a self-feeding hands-free self-belay device. It has also seen use by the second to self-belay while jumaring the rope as one half of the ascender pair. The manufacturer holds uses outside of those validated come with considerable risks, and its official documentation goes so far as to expressly prohibit certain uses.

== Parts of the GriGri and GriGri+ ==
There are seven parts that the GriGri and the GriGri+ have in common.

- Moving side plate
- Cam
- Cam axle
- Friction plate
- Handle
- Fixed side plate
- Attachment holes

The GriGri+ has two additional components:

- Selector knob
- Lock button
