= Connor Herson =

American rock climber (b 2003)

Personal information
- Born: July 8, 2003 (age 23) Redwood City, California
- Occupation: Rock climber

Climbing career
- Type of climber: Traditional climbing; Big wall climbing; Sport climbing
- Highest grade: Redpoint: 9a+ (5.15a)
- First ascents: Drifter's Escape (5.15a / 9a+, 2025); Triple Direct (5.14a / 8b+, 2025); Midnight Way (5.15a / 9a+, 2024); Hairline Free (5.13d alpine, 2024); Pirate's Code (5.14+ / 8c+/9a, 2022); Kilogram (5.14a/8b+, 2021)
- Known for: First-ever person in history to redpoint a traditional climbing route at the grade of 9a+ (5.15a)
- Updated on 11 May 2026

Connor Herson (born 8 July 2003) is an American rock climber known for his achievements in traditional climbing and big wall climbing.

In 2025, Herson completed the first free ascent of Drifter's Escape, an established aid climbing route on the Stawamus Chief in Squamish. He proposed a difficulty grade of 5.15a, making it the first-ever traditional rock climb in history to carry that grade.

He had previously redpointed some of the hardest traditional routes in the world, including Cobra Crack (5.14b), Meltdown, Magic Line, Blackbeard's Tears, Crown Royale and Recovery Drink (all at 5.14c), and Bon Voyage (5.14d).

After onsighting Prayer for a Friend (5.14a), he became the first person to climb a traditional route at the grade with no prior attempts or beta. He repeated this feat when he onsighted Greenspit (5.14a).

He has also greenpointed notable hard sport climbing routes such as Empath at 5.14+ (8c+/9a).

In Yosemite, he is one of only a few climbers to have free climbed The Nose 5.14a (8b+), which he did in 2018 when he was aged 15. In 2025, he repeated a second free-climb of the The Nose and became only the third person after Lynn Hill and Tommy Caldwell to free-climb The Nose in a day (the NIAD), setting a new speed record at 9.5 hours. Herson has free climbed several other major big wall routes on El Capitan including making the first free ascent of Triple Direct 5.14a (8b+), and repeating major routes such as Pre-Muir Wall 5.13d (8b), The Heart Route 5.13b (8a), The Salathe Wall 5.13c (8a+), El Corazon 5.13b (8a) and Golden Gate 5.13a (7c+).

Herson comes from an established rock-climbing family—his father Jim Herson made the second free ascent of the Salathé Wall on El Capitan, and his mother Anne Smith was a competition climber. His sister Kara is also a competition and big wall climber.

In 2026, Climbing magazine gave him their Golden Piton Award for his traditional climbing. In 2023, The American Alpine Club gave him their Robert Hicks Bates award for outstanding accomplishment and promise by a young climber. During this time he was studying for a degree in Electronic Engineering at Stanford University. As a senior, he received the Terman Award for outstanding academic achievement.

== Filmography ==
- Born from the Climbing Life series:
  - Episode 1, Crown Royale
  - Episode 2, The Recovery Drink
  - Episode 3, Bon Voyage
  - Episode 4, Drifter's Escape Featured in the inaugural Mellow Film Tour; also a 5 Point Film Festival 2026 selection.
- Pirate's Code
- Traditional at Heart

== See also ==
- History of rock climbing
- Sonnie Trotter
