= Rope solo climbing =

Type of solo climbing with protection

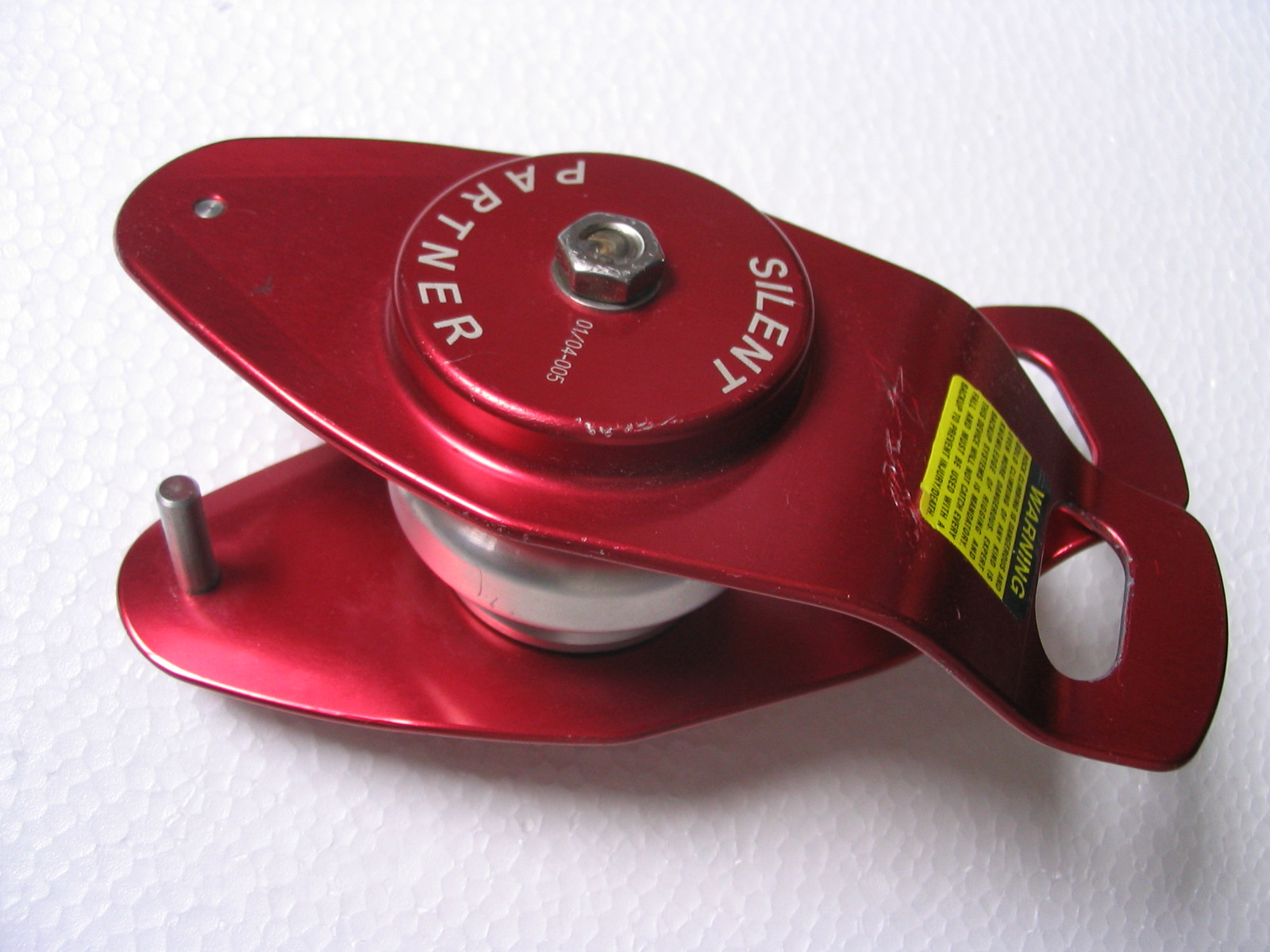
Silent Partner, a self-belay device used for rope solo climbing.

Rope-solo climbing or rope-soloing (or self-belaying) is a form of solo climbing (i.e. performed alone without a climbing partner), but unlike free solo climbing, which is also performed alone and with no climbing protection whatsoever, the rope-solo climber uses a mechanical self-belay device and rope system, which enables them to use the standard climbing protection to protect themselves in the event of a fall.

Rope-soloing can be performed as free climbing in a traditional climbing or a sport climbing format. It can also be performed as aid climbing, and a modified version can be performed as top rope soloing. Due to the complexity of the self-belay system, and the greater workloads, it is still considered a hazardous technique.

Versions of rope-solo climbing have been used by solo alpine climbers for decades, including by French alpinist Catherine Destivelle and Italian alpinist Walter Bonatti. Rope-solo climbing techniques have also been used on big wall climbing routes by rock climbers such as German Alexander Huber and British climber Pete Whittaker.

== Description ==
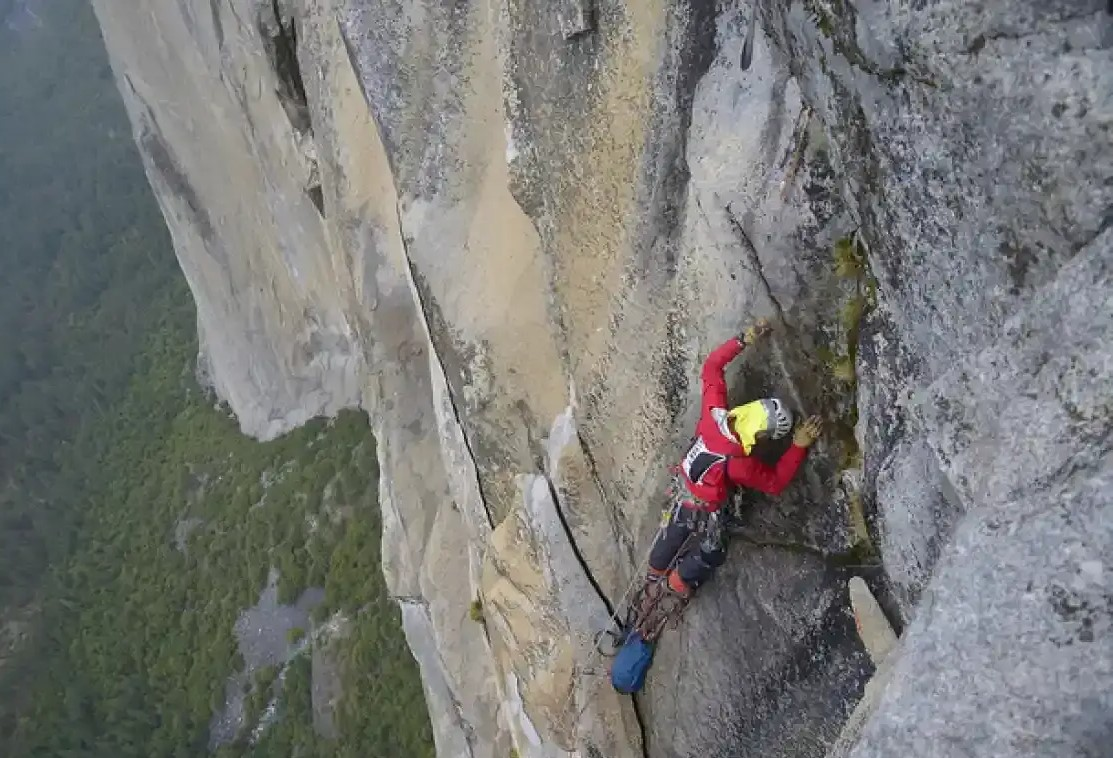
Steve Bate rope soloing while aid climbing on the big wall route, Zodiac (VI 5.8 C3), on El Capitan

In rope-soloing, the climber acts as if they are lead climbing, but instead of having a partner (or belayer) who can arrest the rope in the event of a fall, the climber instead uses a self-belay device and rope system that automatically stops the rope in the event of a fall. In a normal lead climbing system, the lead climber ties into one end of the rope while their second clips-into the rope via their belay device. In rope-solo climbing, this is reversed. Instead, the rope-solo climber ties one end of the rope into a secure anchor at the base of the climb (that can withstand upward forces), and they clip-into the rope via their self-belay device.

As the rope-solo climber ascends, the rope pays through the self-belay device. The rope-solo climber will then clip-into either traditional, sport, or aid climbing protection as they ascend — like a normal lead climber. When the rope-solo climber reaches the top of the route, they then have to fix another anchor, abseil back down to the base of the climb and release the original anchor, and then re-ascend the fixed abseil rope — using ascenders — unclipping/taking out whatever climbing protection equipment they inserted on their earlier ascent. Thus the rope-solo climber has to do significantly more work than a normal lead climber with a climbing partner.

== Equipment ==
=== Self-belay device ===
The most important piece of equipment is the self-belay device, which the climber wears near their chest/harness, which will allow the rope to pass through it as the climber is ascending, but will grip the rope tightly if it suddenly changes direction in the event of a fall. Rope-solo climbers have used various types of self-belay devices, some modified from their original purpose, including Grigris, Revos, and Silent Partners.

=== Rope-solo system ===
The self-belay device is only one part of a complex system designed to ensure that the rope feeds through the self-belay device properly (in both directions) and that the base anchor can handle a wide range of forces.

Some self-belay devices also require that the climber does not invert while falling, which thus require an additional system. Rope-solo climbers use a range of backup systems in case the self-belay device fails to grip the rope and arrest the climber's fall, which can range from making knots in the rope to employing other braking devices.

== Variations ==
A 'Backlooping System' is a technique where the rope-solo climber dispenses with the need to abseil down each completed pitch and then re-ascend the abseil rope, by conducting the rope-solo from fixed-point to fixed-point. While faster, backlooping systems are vulnerable to the individual fixed-points, and thus a failure of a fixed-point — or the application of the backloop system — on a fall can be fatal.

A 'Top-Rope Solo System' is a technique where the rope-solo climber sets up a fixed rope, anchored at the top of the climb, and using a modified progress capture device (PCD), such as a Micro Traxion or a Camp Lift, and ascends the fixed rope, allowing the rope to pass-through the PCD, but in the event of a fall, the PCD grips the rope tightly; top rope soloing can be used in big wall climbing to speed up the process.

== Notable ascents and practitioners ==
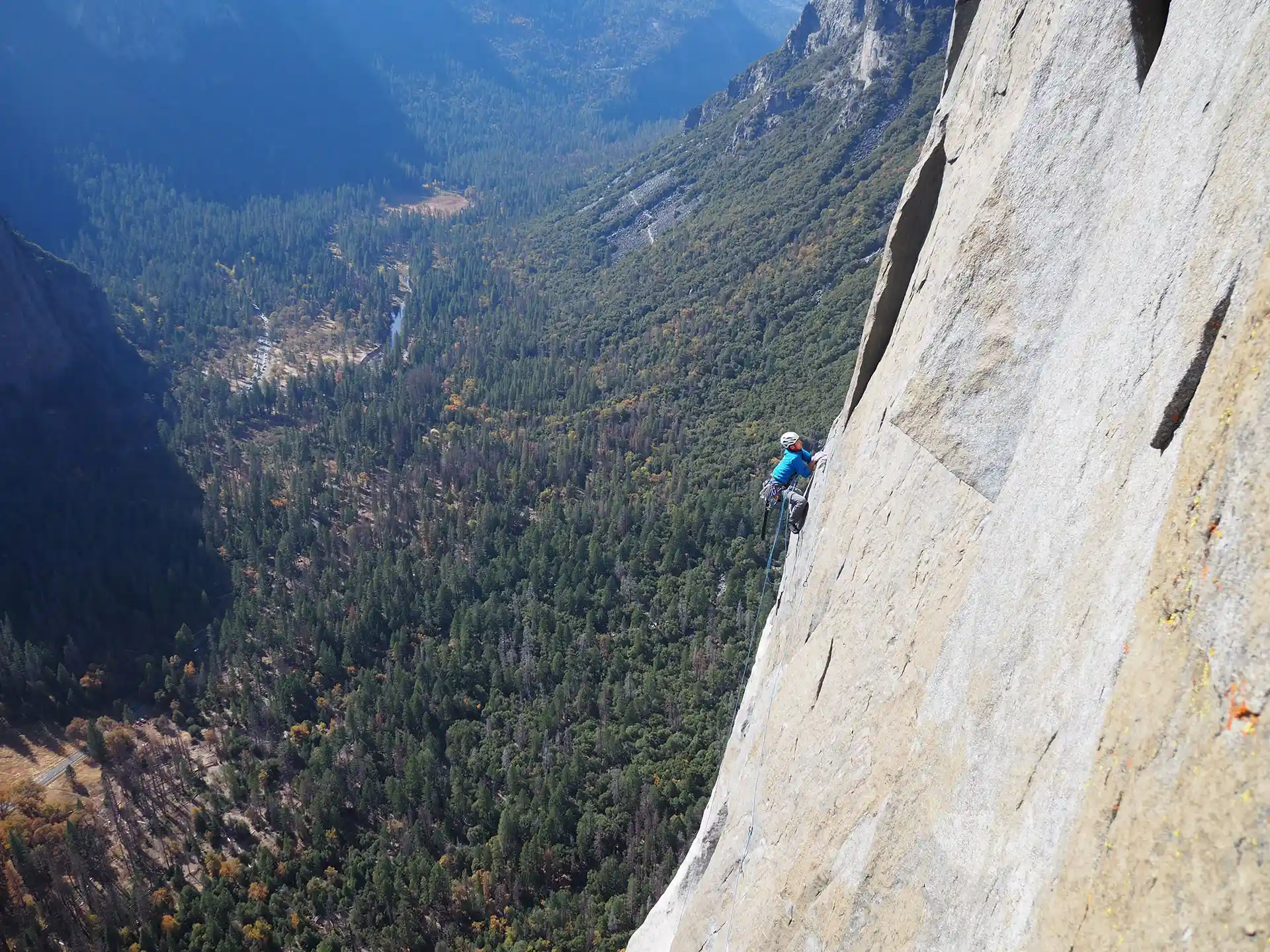
Keita Kurakami rope soloing while free climbing The Nose on El Capitan

Many notable solo ascents by alpinists involved modified/customized versions of rope-solo climbing, including Walter Bonatti's "Z system" self-belay that he employed in making his first solo ascent of the south-east pillar of the Aiguille du Dru, known as the Bonatti Route.

Other notable rope-solo ascents by rope-solo practitioners include:

- Freerider 5.12d (7c) on El Capitan (1000-metres, 37 pitches) In May 2007, Canadian Stephane Perron rope-soloed Freerider in a week. In October 2013, Jorg Verhoeven rope-soloed the route in four days. In November 2016, Pete Whittaker rope-soloed the route in just over 20 hours.
- The Nose 5.14a (8b+) on El Capitan (870-metres, 31 pitches) In November 2018, Japanese climber Keita Kurakami became the fifth person to free climb The Nose, and the first as a rope-solo.
- German climber Alexander Huber, one of the strongest rock climbers in history, made several first free ascents of extreme big wall climbing routes using the rope-solo technique, including Nirwana 8c+ (5.14c) in 2012, Mauerläufer 8b+ (5.14a) in 2018, and Ramayana 8b+ (5.14a) in 2022.
- In 1992, French climber Catherine Destivelle rope-soloed the first part of the traditional climbing route El Matador 5.10d (6b+), on the Devils Tower in Wyoming (she free soloed the second part), which was captured in the climbing film, Ballade à Devil's Tower. In 1992, Destivelle used rope soloing to create Voie Destivelle (VI 5.11b A5) on the west face of the Petit Dru, and was captured in the climbing film, 11 Days on the Dru.

== See also ==
- Lead climbing
- Traditional climbing
