= Le Portalet =

Mountain of the Mont Blanc massif

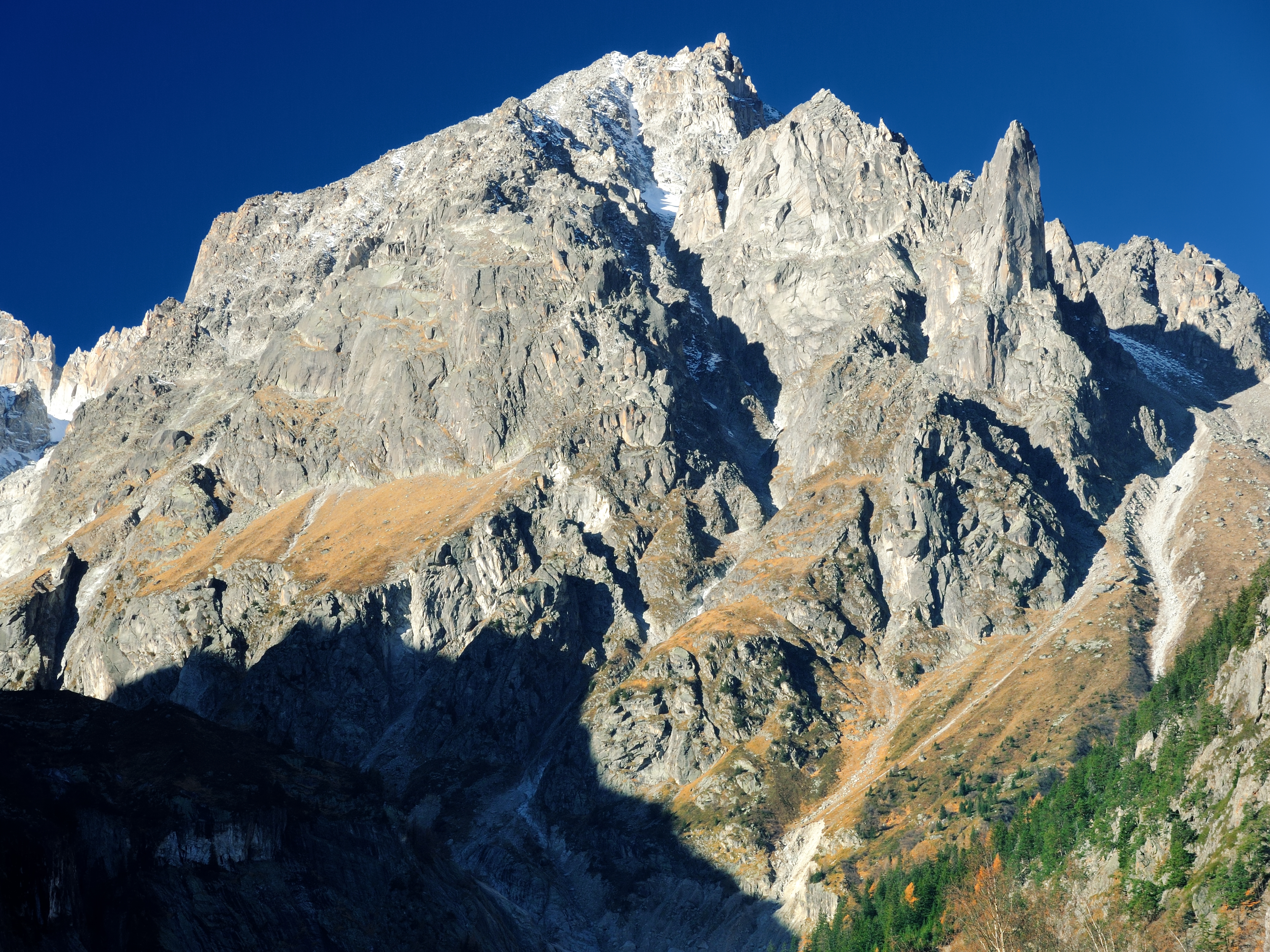
- The east side

Highest point
- Elevation: 3,344 m (10,971 ft)
- Prominence: 177 m (581 ft)
- Coordinates: 45°59′25.1″N 7°3′22.6″E

Geography
- Location within Switzerland
- Location: Valais, Switzerland
- Parent range: Mont Blanc Massif

Le Portalet is a mountain of the Mont Blanc massif, located west of Praz de Fort in the canton of Valais. It lies on the range between the glaciers of Trient and Saleina. It has two important subsidiary summits: Grand Clocher du Portalet (2,983 m) and Petit Clocher du Portalet (2,823 m). The latter forms a needle and is particularly hard to climb.
