= Pete Whittaker =

British rock climber

Personal information
- Born: Peak District, United Kingdom
- Occupation: Professional rock climber

Climbing career
- Type of climber: Traditional climbing, crack climbing
- Highest grade: Bouldering: 8B (V13)
- First ascents: Crown Royale (5.14.d); Century Crack (5.14b); Black Mamba (5.14b); Lamb of God (5.14b)
- Major ascents: Autobahn (5.14b/c, flashed); Recovery Drink (5.14c); Kaa'bah (5.14c); Cobra Crack (5.14b); Stranger Than Fiction (5.14b); Pura Pura (5.14b); The Kraken (V13)
- Known for: First ascents of Crown Royale and Century Crack, two of the world's hardest trad climbs. One of the Wide Boyz duo.
- Updated on 24 February 2026

Pete Whittaker (born 1991) is a British professional rock climber. Whittaker is considered one of the world's best crack climbers, making the first free ascent of Crown Royale (9a/5.14d), one of the world's hardest trad routes. Alongside climbing partner Tom Randall, he also made the first free ascent of Century Crack (8c/5.14b), one of the world's hardest offwidths. Under the name Wide Boyz, Whittaker and Randall produce YouTube videos, provide coaching, and sell specialized crack climbing equipment.

== Climbing career ==
In 2011, Whittaker and Randall made a visit to the United States, where Whittaker was the first to flash Belly Full of Bad Berries (5.13b), a highly regarded offwidth climb in Indian Creek. Continuing the trip, Whittaker and Randall made the first free ascent of the Century Crack (5.14b), then considered the world's hardest offwidth. After initially sending the route with pre-placed gear, both subsequently repeated the climb while placing their own gear. To prepare for the climb, they had trained for two years on a wooden replica of the crack in Randall's home's cellar.

In 2014, Whittaker became the first, by some definitions, to flash Freerider (5.12d) on El Capitan. In 2016, Whittaker became the first to free-climb Freerider in under 24 hours, via rope solo.

In 2021, Whittaker and Randall made the first ascent of the multi-pitch route The Great Rift, a 2,500-foot roof crack on the underside of a M5 motorway bridge over the River Exe in Devon, England. They proposed a grade of 5.13, with pitches ranging from 7b+ to 8a+. The climb was documented in the short film Bridge Boys, which featured in Reel Rock 16.

In 2023, Whittaker established and made the first ascent of the 100-meter crack climb Crown Royale (5.14d) in Jøssingfjord, Norway. He proposed a grade of 9a (5.14d), making it one of the hardest trad routes in the world.

In 2025, Whittaker made the second ascent and first flash of Autobahn in Germany. This route, established by Randall, is perhaps the world's hardest offwidth climb, with a proposed grade of 8c/8c+ (5.14b/c).

Over the years, Whittaker has established many new trad routes in England's Peak District. He and Randall have also jointly established many routes, particularly in Canyonlands National Park, Utah. They won Climbing magazine's 2016 Golden Piton Vision Award for their climbing in this region, particularly their first ascent of The Millennium Arch.

== Notable Ascents ==
=== Redpointed Routes ===
9a (5.14d):

- Crown Royale (link-up of Flying Vikings Direct/Crown Duel and Eigerdosis) – Jøssingfjord (NOR) – Sep 2023 – First ascent

8c+ (5.14c):

- Recovery Drink – Jøssingfjord (NOR) – Aug 2019 – Third ascent
- Kaa'bah – Raven Tor (UK) – Jun 2015 – Sixth ascent

8c (5.14b):

- Stranger Than Fiction – Bartlett Wash (US) – Nov 2023 – Third ascent
- Pura Pura (link-up of Greenshadow and Greenspit) – Orco Valley (ITA) – Oct 2023 – Second ascent
- Black Mamba – Canyonlands (US) – Apr 2019 – First ascent, with Tom Randall
- Lamb of God – Canyonlands (US) – Sep 2017 – First ascent
- Cobra Crack – Squamish (CAN) – Sep 2013 – Eighth ascent
- Century Crack – Canyonlands (US) – Nov 2011 – First free ascent, with Tom Randall

8b+ (5.14a):

- Crown Duel – Jøssingfjord (NOR) – Aug 2019 – First ascent
- Necronomicon – Canyonlands (US) – Apr 2019 – Second ascent, with Tom Randall
- Cruzifix – Canyonlands (US) – Sep 2017 – First ascent
- The Millennium Arch – Canyonlands (US) – Oct 2016 – First ascent (pre-placed gear), with Tom Randall
- Crown of Thorns – Canyonlands (US) – 2016 – First ascent, with Tom Randall

E10 7a:

- The Bigger Baron (extension of Baron Greenback) – Wimberry Rocks (UK) – Mar 2014 – First ascent, proposed 8b+ (5.14a)
- Sleepy Hollow – The Roaches (UK) – Dec 2013 – First ascent

E9 7a:

- Dynamics of Change – Burbage Rocks (UK) – Mar 2008 – First ascent

=== Flashed Routes ===
8c/8c+ (5.14b/c):

- Autobahn – Oranienburg (DEU) – Nov 2025 – Second ascent, First flash

8b/8b+ (5.13d/5.14a):

- La Fuerza de la Gravedad – Vadiello (ESP) – Dec 2022 – First flash

8b (5.13d):

- Ronny Medelsvensson – Jøssingfjord (NOR) – Aug 2019 – First flash

8a (5.13b):

- The Cleaver – Day Canyon (US) – Nov 2023 – First ascent
- Belly Full of Bad Berries – Indian Creek (US) – Oct 2011 – First flash

=== Boulder Problems ===
V13 (8B):

- The Kraken – Hartland Quay (UK) – Jul 2022 – Third ascent

V12 (8A+):

- Yellow Orca – Rocklands (ZAF) – Jun, 2025 – First ascent
- Orange Piranha – Rocklands (ZAF) – Jun, 2025 – Second ascent

=== Multi-Pitch Routes ===
- The Great Rift (762m) – 7b+/8a+ (5.13) – Devon (UK) – Nov 2021 – First ascent, alternating leads with Tom Randall
- Freerider, El Capitan (880m) – 7c (5.12d) – Yosemite (US) – Nov 2016 – First all-free rope solo ascent in under 24 hours (20 hrs, 6 mins)
- Atlantis, Blamann (400m) – 7b (5.12b) (Norway 8-/8) – Kvaløya (NOR) – Jul 2025 – Fastest all-free rope solo ascent (8 hrs, 45 mins)

== Wide Boyz ==
Whittaker and his climbing partner Tom Randall are together known as the Wide Boyz. Under this name, they produce social media content on YouTube and other platforms and host an annual crack climbing competition known as Crack Fest. They also offer training in crack climbing and produce specialized equipment like crack volume holds and gloves.

== Filmography ==
- Wide Boyz (2012), directed by Chris Alstrin and Paul Diffley – Documentary film on the first ascent of Century Crack
- Wide Boyz II – Slender Gentlemen (2014), directed by Paul Diffley – Documentary film on the repeat ascent of Cobra Crack
- Bridge Boys (2022), directed by Peter Mortimer and Nick Rosen – Documentary film on the first ascent of The Great Rift

== Bibliography ==
- Whittaker, Pete. Crack Climbing: The Definitive Guide. Mountaineers Books, 2019. 304 p.
