= Hartland Quay =

Quay in Devon, England

Coordinates: 50.9949°N 4.5345°W

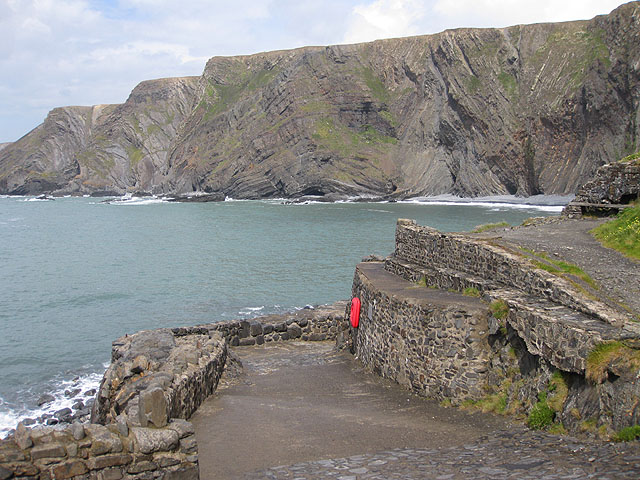
Slipway at Hartland Quay looking towards Warren Cliff, with its display of large upright chevron folds

Hartland Quay is located on the Atlantic coast of Devon, England, south of Hartland Point and north of Bude, Cornwall. It experiences some of the roughest seas in winter and is a former harbour.

== History ==
The harbour dated back to the time of Henry VIII until a storm led to the complete destruction of the pier head and later the whole pier wall in 1887. Parts of the old formation stones can be seen at low tide, as well as evidence of a counter pier. The only evidence visible at all times is the lyme kiln. The old Customs House has been a hotel since 1886 and its former stables are now 'The Wrecker's Retreat' bar. The former corn and hay lofts are now hotel bedrooms. In 'The Wrecker's Retreat' are displayed memorabilia charting the history of Hartland Quay as well as displays of shipwrecks on the coast over the centuries. Also shown are the various films and television shows that have been filmed here. The former Coastguard cottages are now toilets, still a private residence, shop and museum of the quay. Current access to the sea and beach is provided by a slipway.

=== Film location ===
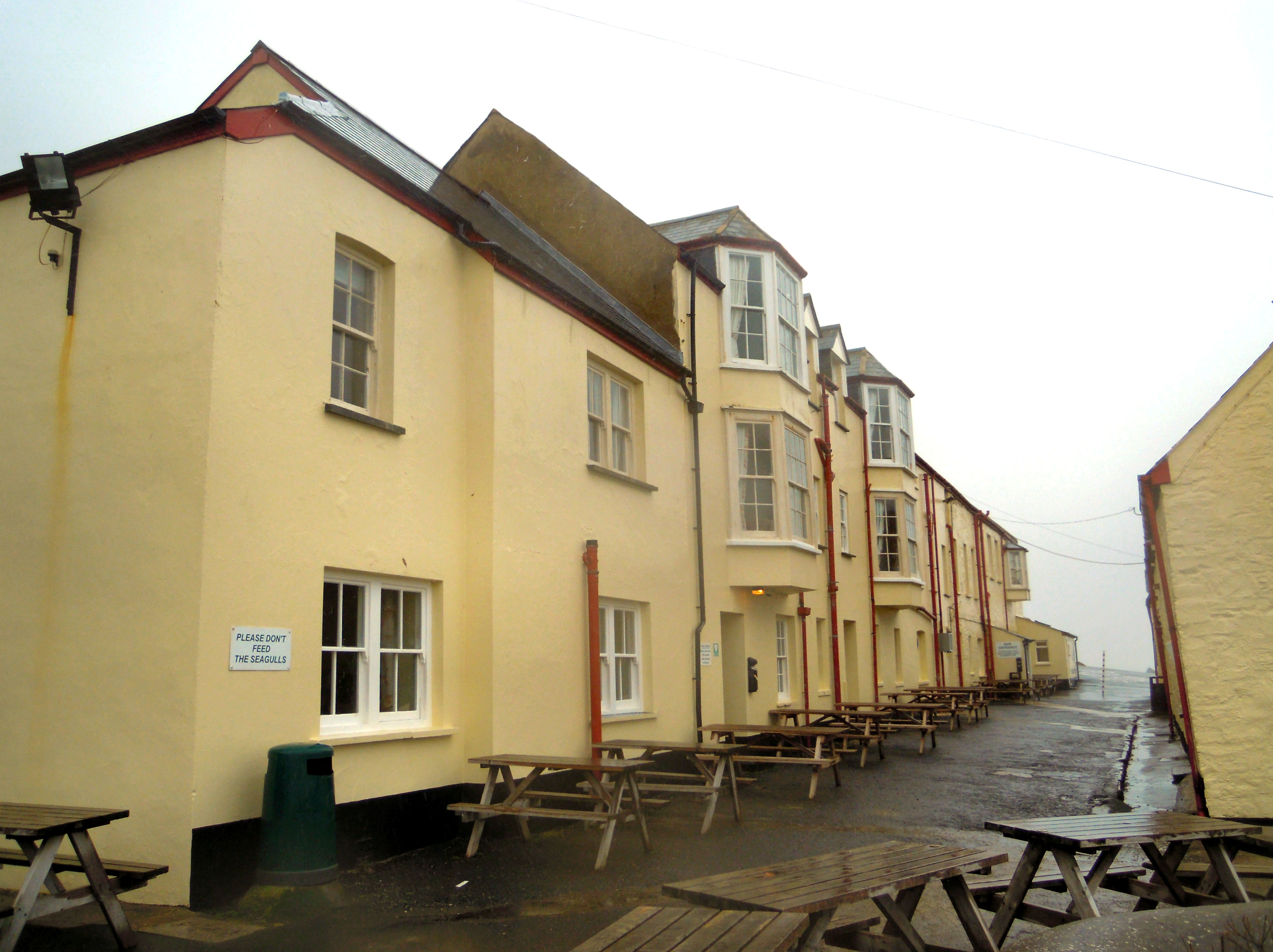
Hartland Quay Hotel and 'Wrecker's Retreat' public house at Hartland Quay in 2018

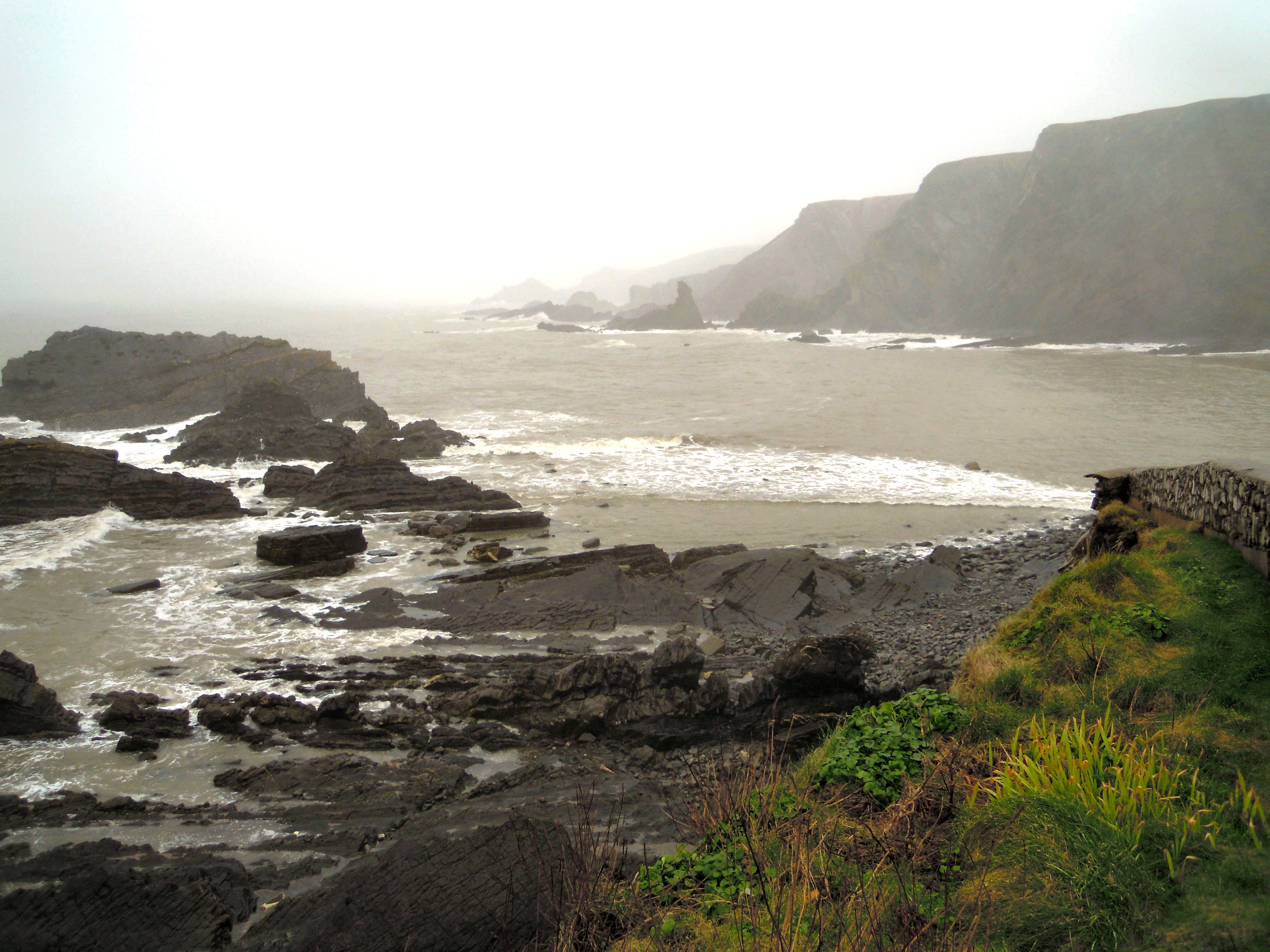
Stormy sea off Hartland Quay (2018)

Hartland Quay has featured in a number of films, including Treasure Island (1950), The War Zone (1995), Element of Doubt (1996), Solomon Kane (2009), and Rebecca (2020).

=== Shipwrecks ===
Several ships have been wrecked at Hartland Quay including SS Rosalia and SS Ginetorix. 19th century wrecks included Edward & Ann (1809), Test (1843), Eclipse (1865), Jenny Jones (1868), Zuma (1871), Deux Freres (1885), Royal Saxon (1886), Londos (1891), and Clipper (1895). Numerous other vessels have come to grief at Hartland Point, a few miles to the north.

== Amenities ==
- Hartland Quay is a popular local tourist destination and offers a view into an historic maritime past as well as accommodation, museum, unusual rock formations, rock pools and sandy coves.
- The Quay is at the start of one of the most challenging sections of the South West Coast Path.
- Hartland Quay hosts motorcycle hill climb events.
- Hartland Quay has a coastal bouldering crag, which is home to the hardest crack boulder in the world, The Kraken V13 (8B).
