= Cobra Crack =

Traditional climbing route in Squamish, Canada

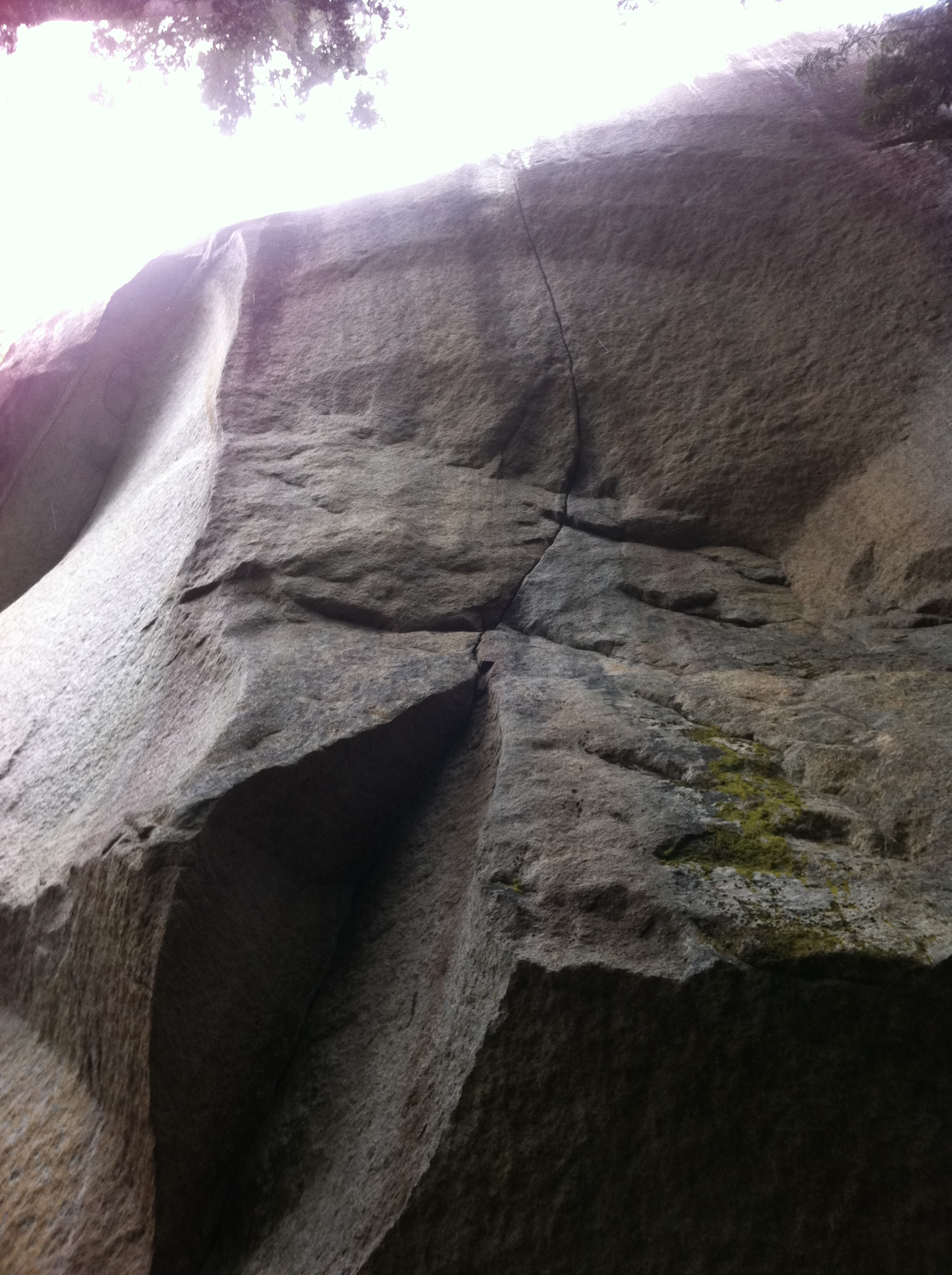
- Cobra Crack as seen from the ground

- Location within British Columbia
- Location: Squamish, British Columbia, Canada
- Coordinates: 49°41′05″N 123°08′12″W
- Climbing area: Cirque of the Uncrackables, backside of Stawamus Chief.
- Route type: Traditional climbing; Crack climbing
- Rock type: Granite
- Vertical gain: 45 m (148 ft)
- Pitches: 1
- Technical grade: 5.14b (8c)
- First ascent: Peter Croft, Tami Knight, 1981.
- First free ascent: Sonnie Trotter, June 2006
- Known for: Hardest traditional crack route in the world at 8c (5.14b)

Cobra Crack is a 45-metre (148-foot) long traditional climbing route on a thin crack up an overhanging granite rock face on Stawamus Chief, in Squamish, British Columbia. The route was first ascended by Peter Croft and Tami Knight in 1981 as an aid climb. After it rebuffed many leading climbers, most notably Swiss climber Didier Berthod in 2005, the Canadian climber Sonnie Trotter made the first free ascent in 2006. With subsequent ascents, the consensus grade has settled at 5.14b (8c), which ranked the route as one of the hardest crack climbs in the world, and almost two decades later, it is still considered one of the world's hardest traditional climbing routes.

== History ==
Peter Croft and Tami Knight, Canadian climbers and Squamish regulars, made the first ascent of Cobra Crack in 1981, a route that is located at the 'Cirque of the Uncrackables' behind Stawamus Chief, in Squamish. They used aid and graded it at A2. The route was named after the distinctive cobra silhouette of the groove that leads into the main crack. By the 2000s, the route had become an open project with the leading traditional climbers vying for the first free ascent.

Swiss traditional climbing and crack specialist, Didier Berthod, attempted to free climb the route in 2005, but failed due to a serious knee injury. Berthod's efforts were recorded as part of an award-winning climbing documentary film, First Ascent, at the end of which he says to the camera (in crutches), "I came here to feed my ego and my vanity – to be the first". Berthod immediately quit climbing and became a Franciscan monk, and his struggles on the "world's hardest crack-climb", and his subsequent religious vocation, attracted international attention.

Canadian climber Sonnie Trotter made the first free ascent in June 2006, after 40 attempts spread over 3 years, placing all of his climbing protection as he was lead climbing on the route. Trotter felt it was a "solid 5.14" route, and with subsequent repeats, the consensus grade has settled on 5.14b (8c). A tradition was started of successful climbers signing a wooden fingerboard (called the "Earlmarker") that hangs near the base of the route.

Berthod, who had returned to climbing after more than a decade's absence, visited Squamish in 2023 for the first time since 2005, and made the first free ascent of the long-standing open project, The Crack of Destiny, which he graded as being harder than 5.14a (8b+). In May 2024, Berthod returned to the route to make the 20th ascent of Cobra Crack.

== Route ==
Cobra Crack is a crack climb with a narrow crack that barely accommodates any fingers. The route has an abrasive surface, causing many to limit their attempts to once or twice per day to avoid excessive skin wear. It, therefore, requires a higher pain threshold, with Trotter saying in 2006: "pain is ever-present, and the mental crux is overlooking the pain move after move".

While the entire route is over 45 metres (148 feet) long, the main crack is c. 30 metres (98 feet). Halfway up the main crack, it begins to sharply overhang at c. 45 degrees, and entering this section requires an extremely difficult and painful move where the climber inserts their middle finger vertically upwards into an "undercut mono pocket" in the 45-degree wall above them.

The technical crux is getting over the lip at the top of the overhang and then immediately making a critical move upwards. In 2006, Trotter said: "The redpoint crux comes over the lip on a slippery side pull; the feet are next to nothing, and it takes momentum and a huge throw to latch the final edge, at which point you're about 15 to 20 feet [above] your last piece of gear—it's really exciting". Contemporary climbers use route beta that employs a dramatic inverted heel hook (i.e. the climber's legs are above their body) to get through this lip.

== Legacy ==
After its first free ascent in 2006, Cobra Crack was considered the hardest traditional crack climbing route in the world. Reporting on Didier Berthod's failed 2005 attempt, El País called it "the most difficult fissure on the planet", while Desnivel said that Favresse's 2008 repeat had: "sealed Cobra Crack's candidacy for the hardest crack on the planet". Two decades after the first free ascent, Cobra Crack still ranks amongst the hardest traditional climbing routes in the world, and only one to two notches below the hardest, which are at 8c+ (5.14c) to potentially 9a (5.14d).

Cobra Crack remains an important route in traditional climbing history and repeats are covered in the climbing media. In 2017, after Mason Earle made the 11th ascent, PlanetMountain wrote: "Cobra Crack immediately struck a chord, in part due to the heinous finger-locks required to power through the crux, in part due to its innate beauty. Over the years some of the best crack specialists in the world have been drawn to the line and while it may have lost some of its original fearsome reputation, the climb is just as beautiful as ever." In 2021, Gripped Magazine said: "Over the past decade and a half, it's become one of the world's most sought-after single-pitch gear [traditional] climbs". In 2023, Climbing called the route "famous" and "iconic".

== Ascents ==
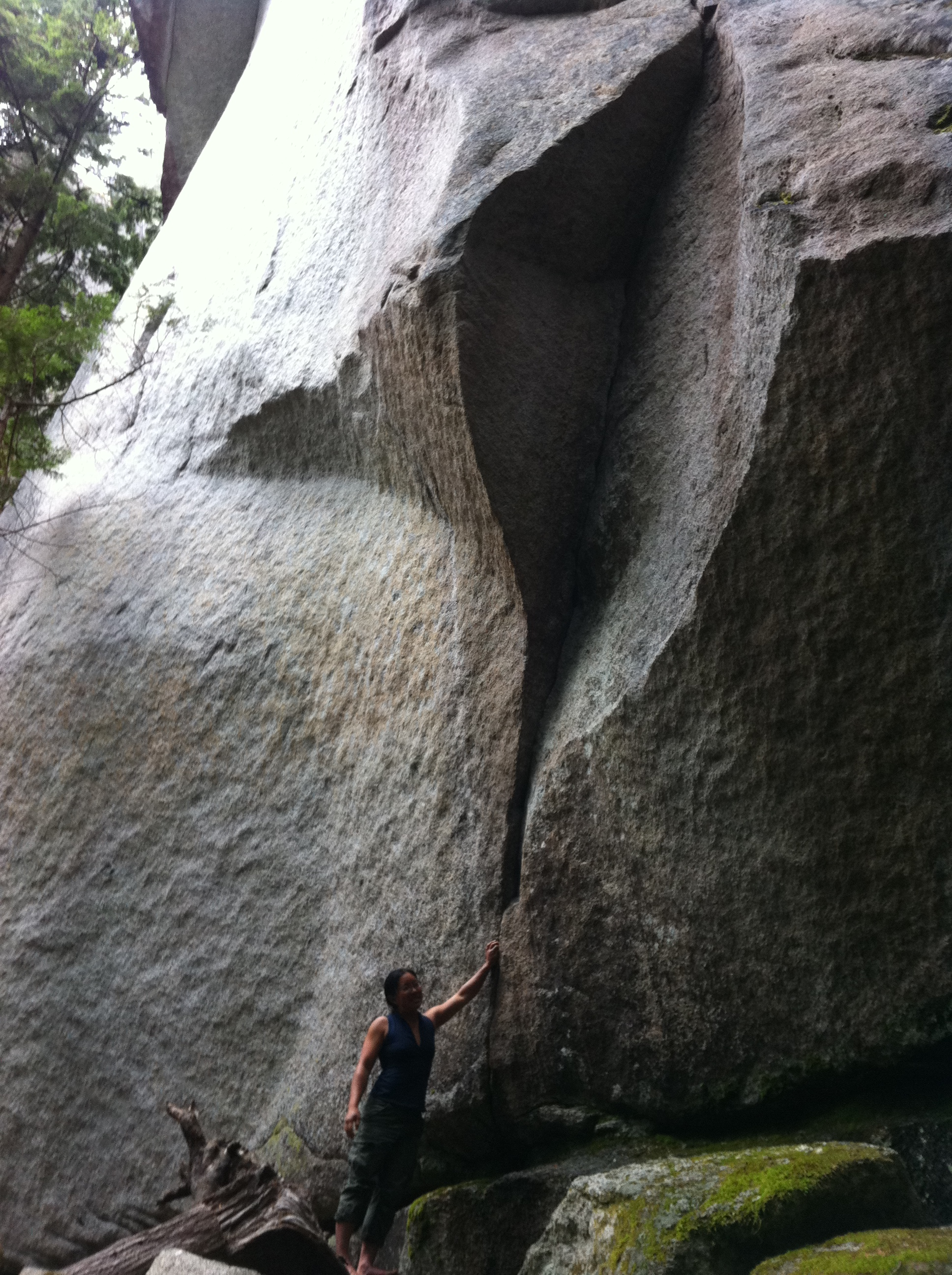
Climber standing at the distinctive 'cobra' silhouette groove at the start of the route

Cobra Crack has been climbed by:

- 1st (as an aid climbing route). Peter Croft & Tami Knight in 1981 (as an A2-graded aid route).
- 1st (as a free climbing route). Sonnie Trotter in June 2006.
- 2nd. Nicolas Favresse in July 2008.
- 3rd. Ethan Pringle in August 2008.
- 4th. Matt Segal in September 2008.
- 5th. Will Stanhope in July 2009.
- 6th. Yuji Hirayama in September 2009.
- 7th. Alex Honnold in 2011.
- 8th. Pete Whittaker in September 2013.
- 9th. Tom Randall in September 2013.
- 10th. Ben Harnden in May 2016.
- 11th. Mason Earle in October 2017.
- 12th. Logan Barber in September 2017.
- 13th. Said Belhaj in 2017.
- 14th. Tristan Baills in 2019.
- 15th. Ryan Sklenica in July 2021.
- 16th. Stu Smith in 2021.
- 17th. Nat Bailey in May 2023.
- 18th. Connor Herson in August 2023.
- 19th. Adrian Vanoni in September 2023.
- 20th. Didier Berthod in May 2024.
- 21st. Ethan Salvo in August 2024.
- 22nd. Lan Jin in May 2026.
- 23rd. Jerome St-Michel in July 2026.

== Filmography ==
- First Ascent: The Movie (2005), Peter Mortimer. Sender Films. ASIN B000IWPP4G. – Documentary with Didier Berthod.

== See also ==
- Indian Face, British E9-graded traditional climbing route from 1986
- Separate Reality, American 5.12a-graded traditional climbing route from 1978
- Prinzip Hoffnung, Austrian 8b/+ graded traditional climbing route from 2009
- Rhapsody, British E11-graded traditional climbing route from 2006
