= Crack climbing =

Type of rock climbing route

Examples of crack climbing

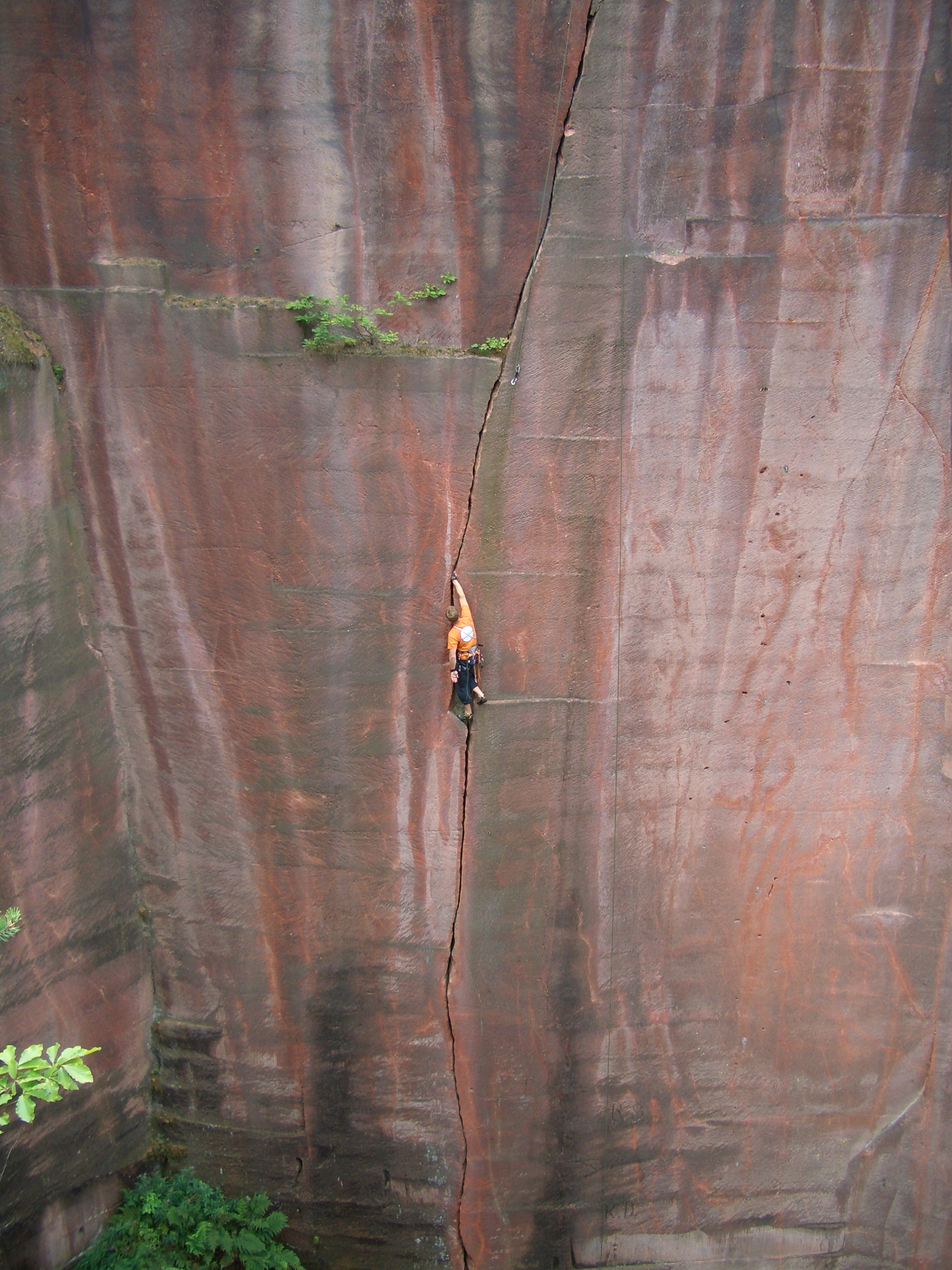
Hand jamming

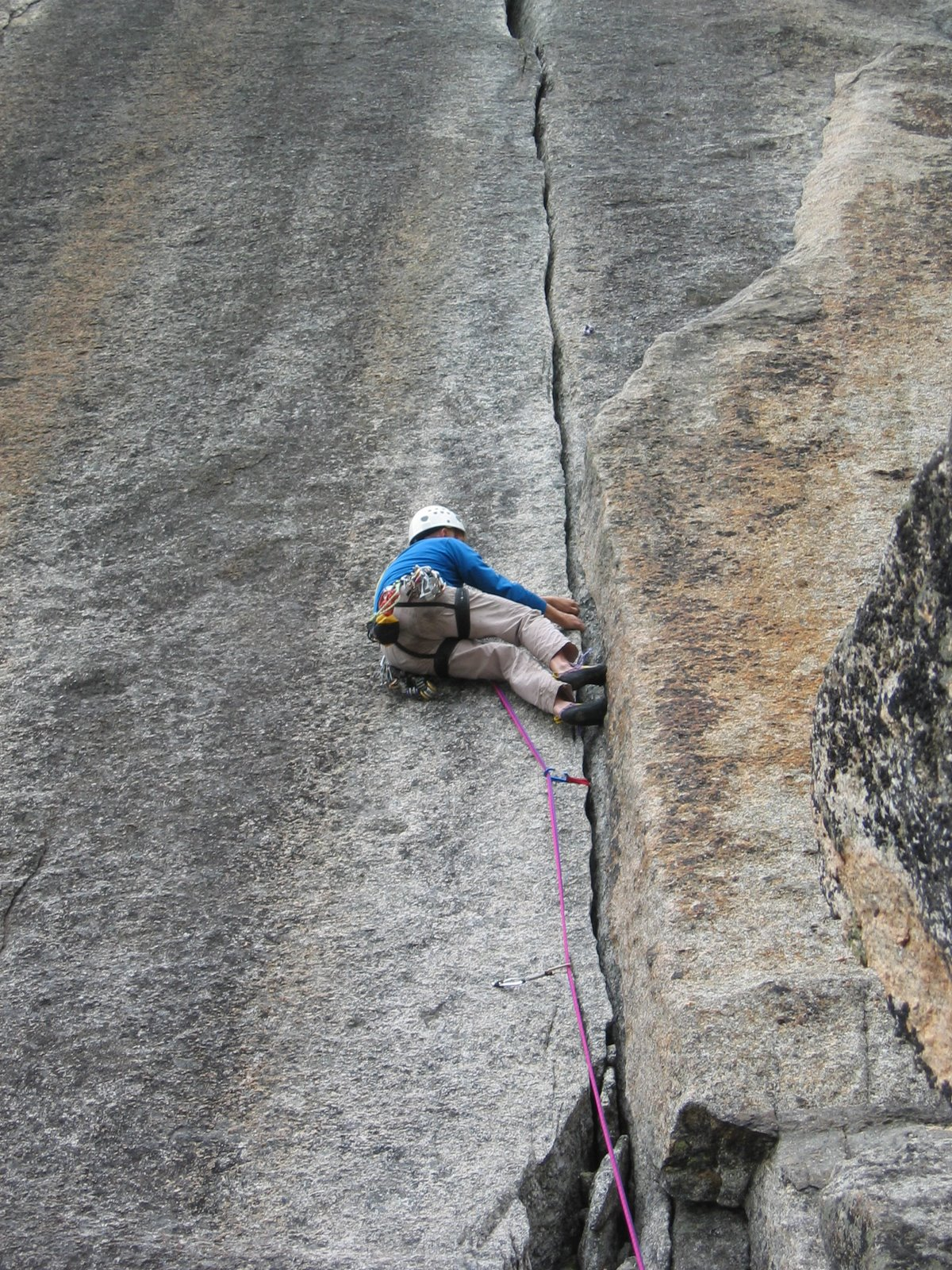
Laybacking

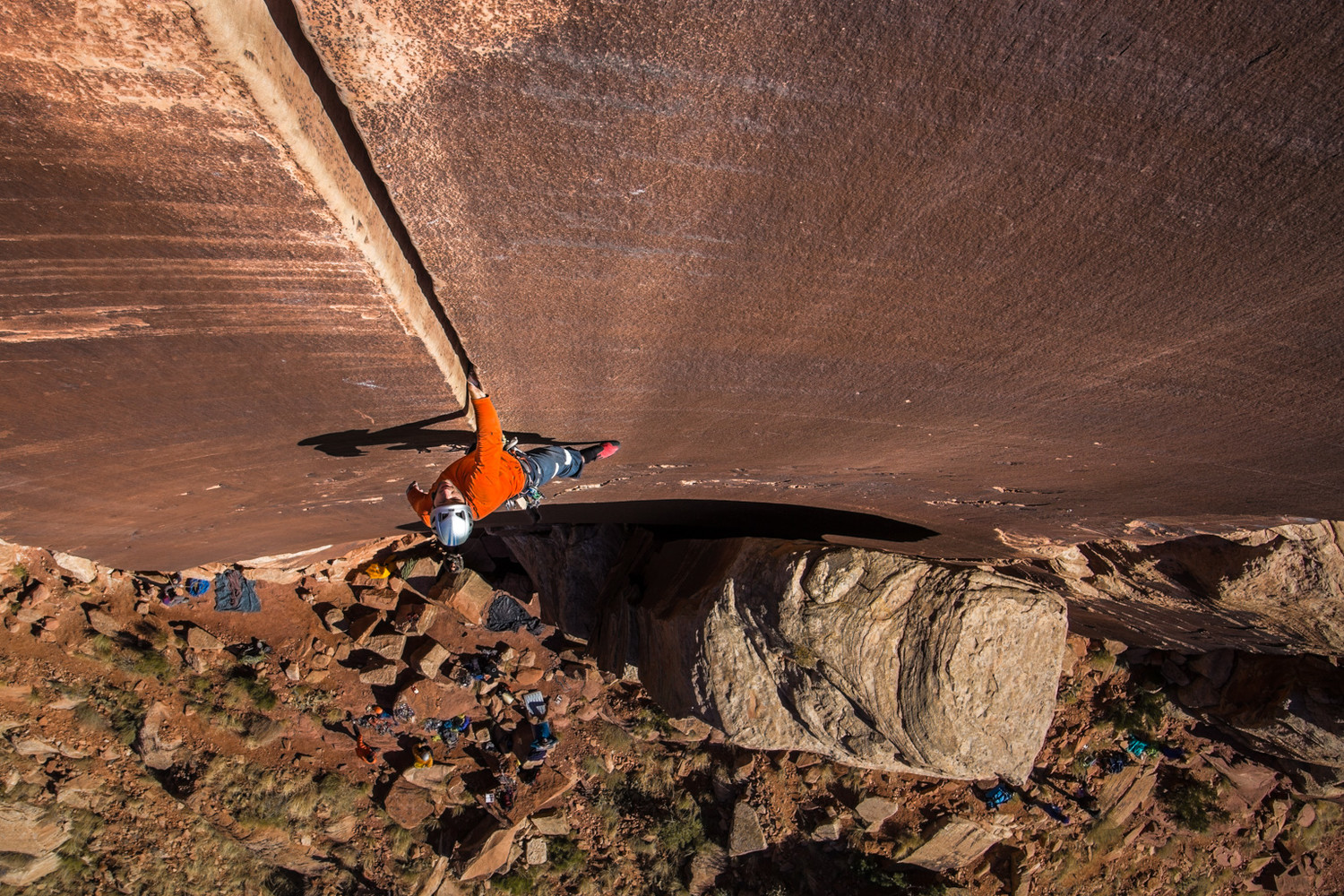
Arm jamming

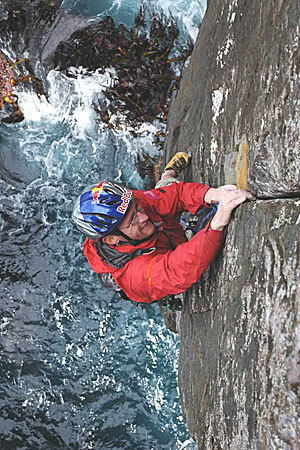
Finger jamming

In rock climbing, a crack climb is a type of climbing route that follows a crack or fissure, or system of cracks or fissures, which the climber uses to ascend the route. The width of the crack dictates the techniques needed, and crack-climbs are further differentiated by the body parts that can be 'jammed' into them, such as finger cracks (the narrowest), hand/fist cracks, arm cracks, and body (also called chimney) cracks. Off-width cracks are some of the most awkward, being too wide for the hands or fists, but too narrow to accommodate the body. A top-to-bottom uniform-width crack is known as a splitter crack.

Crack climbing routes require a broad range of techniques, but most importantly emphasize the techniques of 'laybacking' and of 'jamming'. Laybacking requires the crack to be off-set (i.e. one side protrudes) or in a corner, to create the opposing forces needed for the technique. 'Jamming' is where the climber physically "jams" a body-part(s) into the crack which they then pull on to gain upward momentum. The type of rock has an important effect on the effectiveness of 'jamming', with the high-friction surface of granite being particularly suited to the technique. The friction needed for 'jamming' can wear the climber's skin, requiring medical tape or specialist gloves for long crack routes.

Crack climbs are particularly suited to traditional climbing as the crack can accommodate the protection (e.g. Separate Reality). The invention of spring-loaded camming devices in the 1970s revolutionised the difficulty of cracks that could be attempted by traditional climbers, and led to new grade milestones set on crack-routes such as The Phoenix in 1977, the world's first-ever 7c+ (5.13a), and Grand Illusion in 1979, the world's first-ever 8a (5.13b). While the advent of bolted sport climbing routes in the 1980s diverted focus to the blanker face climbs, crack-climbs continued to feature prominently in the development of multi-pitch and big wall climbs, and most notably on the giant granite cracks on El Capitan and its famous routes such as The Nose.

The early 2000s saw a resurgence in traditional climbing, placing crack-climbing back in focus. Swiss climber Didier Berthod 'greenpointed' the bolted crack line of Greenspit at 8b+ (5.14a), as did Canadian Sonnie Trotter on The Path, and Austrian Beat Kammerlander on Prinzip Hoffnung. In 2006, new traditional-grade milestones were set on crack-climbs by Trotter on Cobra Crack at 8c (5.14b), and by Scottish climber Dave MacLeod on Rhapsody at 8c+ (5.14c). In 2008, American climber Beth Rodden freed the Yosemite crack-line of Meltdown at 8c+ (5.14c), becoming the first-ever women to climb a traditional route at that grade, which at the time was also the highest traditional grade climbed anywhere. In 2011, British crack specialists, Pete Whittaker and Tom Randall, climbed the world's hardest off-width crack, Century Crack at 8b (5.13d). In 2021, the same duo climbed the world's longest roof climb, a 762-metre (2,500 ft) cement crack under the M5 in Devon, The Great Rift at 5.13 (7c+).

== See also ==
- Face climbing
- Overhang (climbing)
- Slab climbing
- Rock-climbing technique
