= Harthill Moor =

Hill in the Peak District of England

Coordinates: 53.162°N 1.679°W

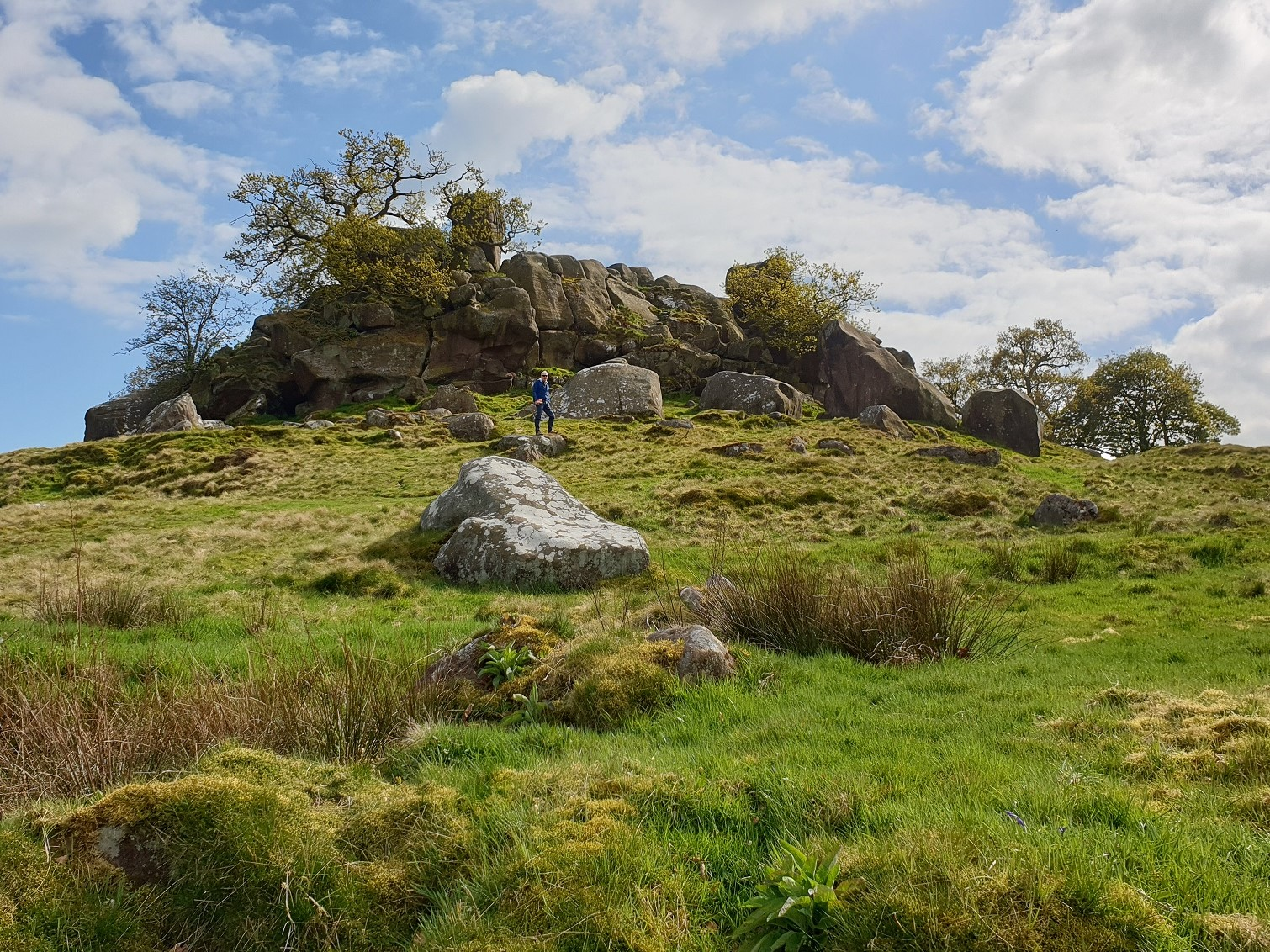
Robin Hood's Stride

Harthill Moor is a small upland area in the Derbyshire Peak District of central and northern England, lying between Matlock and Bakewell near the villages of Birchover and Elton. The moor is within the southern portion of Harthill civil parish. Its highest point is 272 metres (892 ft) above sea level. The River Bradford flows along the northern edge of the moor past Youlgreave and into the River Lathkill at Alport. Harthill Moor is a rich prehistoric landscape with several protected scheduled monuments.

The rock of Harthill Moor and nearby Stanton Moor is known as Ashover Grit, an outlier of Millstone Grit. This is a coarse-grained sandstone which weathers to produce coarse sub-soils, rich in sand, and the soils themselves are typically podzols. The Ashover Grit sandstone layer lies on top of shale, which in turn lie upon Carboniferous limestone.

Robin Hood's Stride (also called Mock Beggar Hall) is a prominent natural rock formation with distinctive pinnacle towers. Prehistoric rock art has been found on and close to the gritstone outcrop. It is a popular location for bouldering and limited short climbing is possible on Weasel pinnacle and Inaccessible pinnacle. Nearby Cratcliffe Tor provides more challenging rock climbing, with over 200 graded routes.

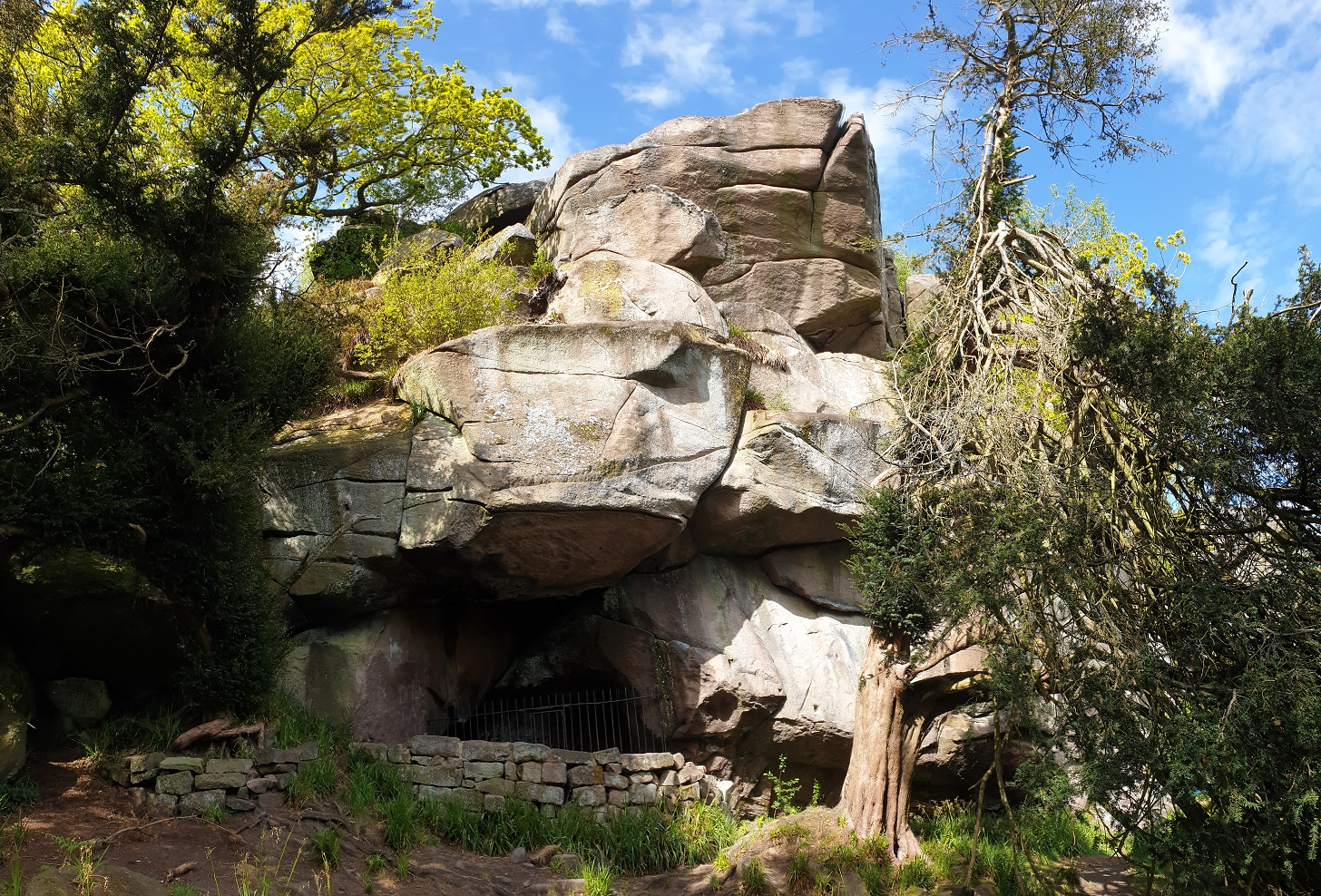
Hermit's Cave at Cratcliff Rocks

Cratcliff Rocks is an extensive rock outcrop on the edge of Harthill Moor in the eastern gritstone moors of Derbyshire. Cratcliff Rocks defended settlement is an ancient enclosure in the field to the north east of Robin Hood's Stride. The monument lies on the western edge of the Cratcliff Rocks outcrop and is in the form of a round enclosure about 100m wide with a 5m wide ditch cut into the rock. Several building platforms have been identified inside the enclosure. Whilst the site has not been excavated, it is considered to be linked to the other Bronze Age features of Harthill Moor. Cratcliff Rocks hermitage is a medieval hermit's cave. The rock shelter has a number of recesses cut into the walls for candles and sacred objects. A bas-relief crucifix carved in the cave has been dated to the 13th or 14th century. On the rock face outside the shelter, chiselled grooves and sockets for timber beams indicate where the roof structure was of a building adjoining the cave.

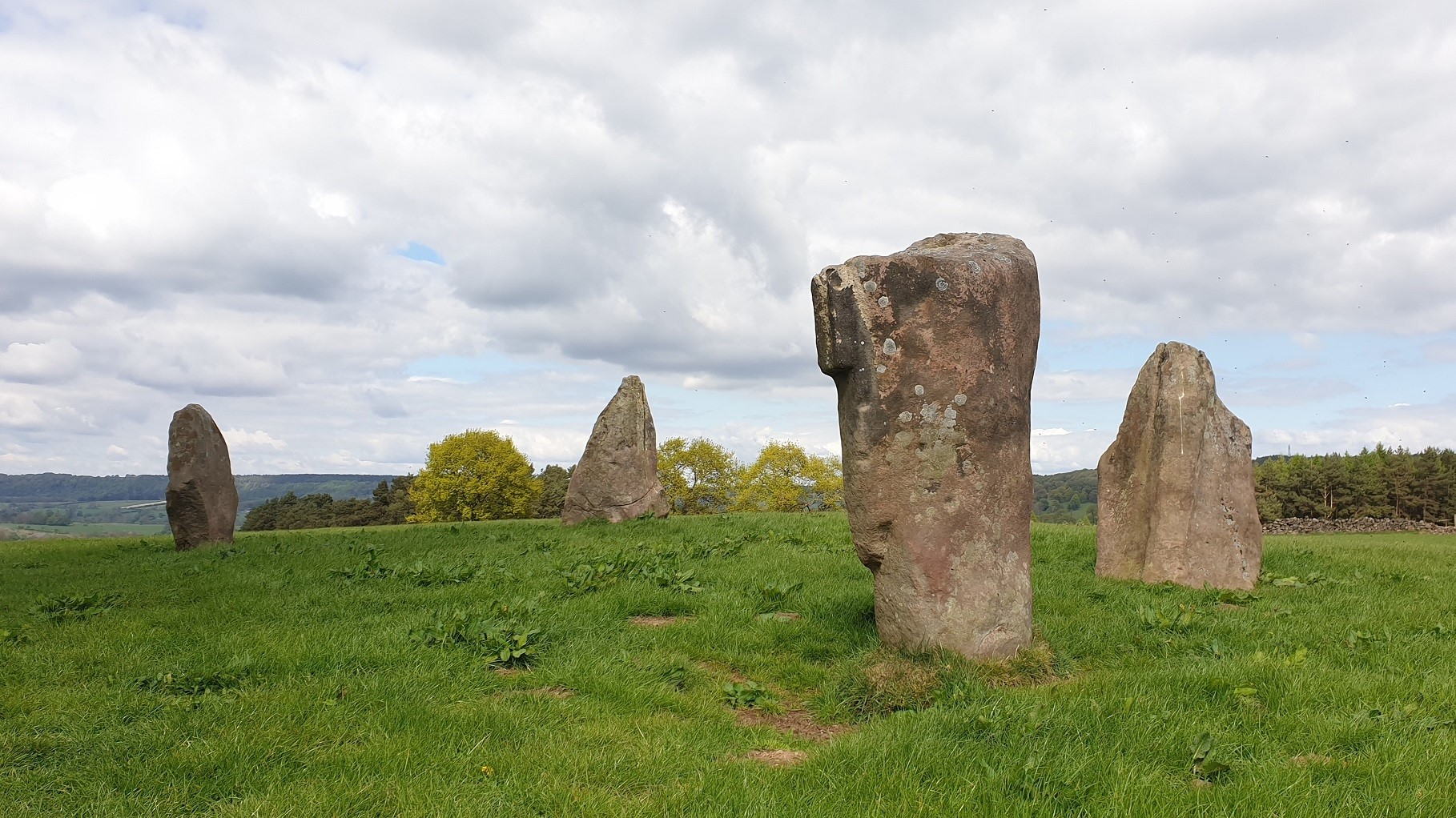
Nine Stones Close

Nine Stones Close is a Bronze Age stone circle about 30m across, with four remaining upright stones about 2m high. Several original stones were removed in the 18th and 19th centuries, one of which stands in a field wall 70m to the south where it was taken to be used as a gatepost. Partial excavations of the circle were conducted by Thomas Bateman in 1847, Jewitt and Greenwell in 1877 and J P Heathcote in 1939. Many Bronze Age flints and pot-sherds were discovered. Doll Tor stone circle lies about 1 kilometre (0.62 mi) east of Nine Stones Close. A further 1.5 kilometres (0.93 mi) north east is Nine Ladies stone circle on Stanton Moor.

The Castle Ring defended settlement (immediately north of Harthill Moor Farm) now consists of an oval earthwork ditch (about 5m wide and 100m across) with inner and outer banks, up to 2m high. It hasn't been excavated but it is considered to be an integral part of the Bronze Age landscape of Harthill Moor. Harthill Moor bowl barrow is a Bronze Age burial mound about 150m SE of Harthill Moor Farm. It is 20m long and 11m wide. It was partially excavated in 1877 by Jewitt and Greenwell. A limestone cist was found with the remains from two cremations.

The Derbyshire Portway prehistoric road runs across Harthill Moor in a north-south direction. It passes between Robin Hood's Stride and Cratcliff Rocks and past Nine Stones Close. It was an ancient route between Mam Tor in the Peak District to the Hemlock Stone near Nottingham. The Limestone Way long distance footpath follows the Derbyshire Portway route across Harthill Moor but then heads around the Castle Ring earthwork towards Youlgreave.

Harthill Hall, on the northern edge of the moor near Alport, is the manor of a great 13th-century estate. The 16th-century manor house, farm house and 14th-century chapel still stand. Harthill was recorded as Hortel and Hortil in the Domesday Book, as part of the lands of the Norman knights Henry de Ferrers and Ralph FitzHubert.
