= Hard Grit =

- Seb Grieve on Meshuga (E9 7a), cover of Hard Grit & Hard Plastic (2006 edition)
- Directed by: Richard Heap
- Written by: Niall Grimes
- Produced by: Richard Heap, Mark Turnbull
- Starring: Robin Barker; Neil Bentley; John Dunne; Johnny Dawes; Richard Ekehed; Seb Grieve; Leo Houlding; Dave Jones; Jerry Moffatt; Ben Moon; Jean-Minh Trin-Thieu; Sam Whittaker
- Edited by: Richard Heap
- Production company: Slackjaw Film
- Release date: 1998
- Running time: 53 minutes (1998); 80 minutes (2006)
- Country: United Kingdom
- Language: English

Hard Grit is a 1998 British rock climbing film directed by Richard Heap and produced by Slackjaw Film, featuring traditional climbing, free soloing, and bouldering on gritstone routes in the Peak District in Northern England. It is considered an important film in the genre and regarded as a historic and iconic film. The film starts with a dramatic fall by French climber Jean–Minh Trinh-Thieu on Gaia at Black Rocks. Hard Grit won ten international film festival awards.

== Content ==
The film dramatically opens with French climber Jean–Minh Trinh-Thieu taking a large fall from the top of the Johnny Dawes's gritstone test-piece, Gaia (E8 6c) at Black Rocks, from which Trinh-Thieu broke his leg. Rock & Ice called it "the most iconic rock climbing whipper [fall] of all time".

Shortly after the opening, film narrator Niall Grimes gives a brief and humorous overview of the history of gritstone climbing. As well as traditional climbing routes, the film also includes ascents of extreme gritstone bouldering and highball bouldering problems by Ben Moon and others. The creators of many of the extreme routes climbed in the film, Jerry Moffatt, Johnny Dawes, and John Dunne, are also shown speculating, and top roping on, future projects such as Wizard Ridge.

The film shows other large falls, although without serious injury, including Swedish climber Richard Ekehed taking a large fall on Master's Edge, and British climber Seb Grieve falling from high up on Parthian Shot (E9 7a) on very thin protection. The film also features several important first and second ascents of extreme routes, including the first free ascent by Seb Grieve of Meshuga (E9 6c), at Black Rocks, and Robin Barker's first ascent of Marbellous (E8 7a), at Stanage Edge.

== Cast ==
Niall Grimes acts as narrator.

The climbers are (in alphabetical order):

- Robin Barker
- Neil Bentley
- John Dunne
- Johnny Dawes
- Richard Ekehed
- Seb Grieve
- Leo Houlding
- Dave Jones
- Jerry Moffatt
- Ben Moon
- Jean-Minh Trin-Thieu
- Sam Whittaker

== Production ==
By 1997, Richard Heap had been climbing full-time and living off the British social welfare system (the "dole") for a number of years. He was part of what he termed the "Sheffield scene" of leading British gritstone climbers and was renting a room in Seb Grieve's house. After attending a video production course at a local college, Johnny Dawes asked Heap to edit Best Forgotten Art (1996), and then left Heap with his camera equipment as he traveled to America. Heap spent the 1997 gritstone climbing season filming his friends attempting new routes, and Seb Grieve in particular. After a day of shooting that captured Grieve's first ascent of Mesuga, and Trinh-Thieu's fall on Gaia, Heap said that "I knew we had something really special". Heap engaged Mark Turnbull to help produce the film (they formed SlackJaw Film), and engaged Niall Grimes to create a narrative for the film that Heap felt was needed to give it structure and ensure that it was not just a "random collection of routes".

In 2006, SlackJaw re-released the film as Hard Grit & Hard Plastic, which included extra material that increased the film's run time to 80 minutes, and had footage from the men's final in the Foundry International Bouldering Open of 1997 featuring Chris Sharma.

== Legacy ==
Hard Grit is regarded as an important and iconic film in the genre, regularly appearing in top-10/20 type lists, and was particularly noted for the blunt and direct portrayal of the risks and dangers of extreme gritstone climbing, and the portrayal of how the climbers dealt with the fear and stress they undertook climbing thinly protected extreme gritstone routes. Director Richard Heap decided against a follow-up film, due to concerns that future films could involve serious accidents, inadvertently producing what he called a "climbing snuff movie".

The film demonstrated the techniques that leading climbers were using in British traditional climbing, including top roping prospective routes to practice moves, and the use of headpointing (e.g. the pre-placing of temporary protection equipment on the route), to reduce the risks of serious harm and injury. It also introduced the use of bouldering mats and highball bouldering techniques.

Hard Grit showcased the unique aspects of extreme Peak District gritstone climbing to the wider climbing world, which involved moderate height 10-20 metre routes, with limited/thin protection, requiring balance and friction-based climbing on tiny pebbles/crystals, and that often took place in winter months when the dry colder air aided friction. American climber Kevin Jorgeson described the effect that seeing the original film had saying that: "Without Hard Grit I doubt there would have been a UK trip in 2008", which was when Alex Honnold and Jorgeson traveled to the Peak District to repeat many of the routes featured in the film. Other leading international climbers have been inspired by the film to travel to the Peak District and climb the featured gritstone routes, such as Belgian climber Siebe Vanhee (in 2021), Italian climbers Mauro Calibani (in 2002), and Michele Caminati (in 2013). In 2006, American climber Lisa Rands, who had also watched the film, travelled to the Peak District and completed the first female ascent of Gaia and the End of the Affair, becoming the first female to climb an E8-graded route.

== Featured routes ==
The following routes are climbed in the film (in the order in which they appear):

- Gaia (E8 6c), Black Rocks, shows a dramatic leg-breaking fall by Jean–Minh Trinh-Thieu on Dawes' 1986 route; Leo Houlding later ascends.
- Fat Slapper (E7 6c), Eastwood Rocks, features the first free ascent by Seb Grieve of an 11-metre roof route.
- Piece of Mind (E6 6b), Roches Lower Tier, shows Sam Whitaker free soloing Johnny Woodward's 1977 blunt and almost unprotectable 12-metre rib.
- Samson (E8 7b) or as highball boulder at 8A (V11), Burbage South Edge, Jerry Moffatt top roping his 1997 12-metre route.
- End of the Affair (E8 6c), Curbar Edge, after first top-roping, Leo Houlding then ascends one of Johnny Dawes' final 1986 gritstone test pieces.
- Kaluza Klein (E7 6c), Robin Hood's Stride, Leo Houlding ascends a short circa. 6-metre Johnny Dawes' 1986 route.
- Braille Trail (E7 6c), Burbage South Edge, Australian climber Dave Jones, after several major falls, climbs Dawes' 1984 10-metre route.
- Paralogism (E7 6c), Roches Upper Tier, shows Seb Grieve making the second ascent of Simon Nadin's 1987 roof route.
- Master's Edge (E7 6c), Millstone Edge, Swedish climber Richard Ekehed, with some long falls, climbs Ron Fawcett's 1983 gritstone arete.
- The New Statesman (E8 7a), Ilkley (The Cow), shows Neil Bentley making the third ascent of John Dunne's 1988 route.
- Parthian Shot (E9 7a), Burbage South, Seb Grieve takes long falls on tiny protection to make the second ascent of John Dunne's 1989 route.
- Various bouldering problems are shown, including: Neil Bently (Blind Fig 7C (V9) at Burbage North), Ben Moon (Ben's Wall 7C (V9) at Curbar Edge, Brad Pitt 7C (V9) at Stanage Edge, and Mushin' 7C+ (V10) at Roches Lower Tier ), and Jerry Moffatt (The Joker 8A (V11) at Stanage Edge).
- Renegade Master (E8 7a) or a 7C+ (V10) boulder, Froggatt Edge, Neil Bentley makes the second ascent of Jerry Moffatt's 1995 7-metre route.
- Marbellous (E8 7a), Stanage Edge, shows the first ascent by Robin Barker of one of the last "last great problems" of Stanage Edge.
- Fast Forward (E7 6c), Ilkley (The Cow), shows John Dunne, after a few falls, making the first free ascent.
- Meshuga (E9 6c), Black Rocks, features the first free ascent by Seb Grieve (wearing jeans for extra friction).

=== Subsequently climbed ===
Towards the end of the film, there is a section on future gritstone routes and projects (or "last great problems"), some of which are shown being attempted on a top rope (e.g. Johnny Dawes on Wizard Ridge, and Ben Moon on Smiling Buttress), and others are just alluded to (and in the case of Equilibrium, only very briefly). A number of these routes were subsequently climbed, including:

- Equilibrium in February 2000 at Burbage South Edge, by Neil Bentley, and since graded E10 7a; it became Britain's first-ever E10-graded route.
- Elder Statesman (or Elder Crack Arete) in March 2004 at Curbar Edge, by Steve McClure, and since graded E8 7b.
- The Groove in February 2008 at Cratcliffe Tor by James Pearson, initially graded E10/11 but since graded E9 7b.
- Smiling Buttress in December 2013 at Curbar Edge by Tyler Landman, and since graded boulder 8B (V13).

Two decades later, the most prominent "last great problem" from Hard Grit remains Dawes' Wizard Ridge at Burbage South Quarries.

== Awards ==
Hard Grit won ten international film festival awards:

- IOC Award Poprad International Mountain Film Festival, Slovakia 1998
- Kamera Alpin in Gold International Mountain & Adventure Film Festival, Graz, Austria 1998
- Katherine A. Rae Award 1999
- Italian Olympic Committee Award 47th Trento International Film Festival, Italy 1999
- Best Film in "Vertical" category, G-Fest, Colorado, USA 1999
- Best "Mountain Sport Film", Teplice International Film Festival, Czech Republic 1999
- Best "Rock Climbing Film", Kendal Mountain Film Festival, UK 1999
- "Silver Conch" at the 3rd International Sports Film Festival, Santander, Spain 2000
- Special mention of Jury, Torello Festival, Spain 2000
- Special mention of Jury, Premio Alp Cervino festival, Italy 2000

== See also ==
- History of rock climbing
- Rock climbing in the Peak District
