= Lisa Rands =

American rock climber

Personal information
- Born: October 21, 1975 (age 50) Southern California, U.S.
- Education: California State Polytechnic University, Pomona
- Height: 5 ft 4 in (163 cm)
- Weight: 115 lb (52 kg)
- Spouse: Wills Young
- Website: LisaRands.com

Climbing career
- Type of climber: Bouldering; Competition climbing; Traditional climbing; Sport climbing
- Highest grade: Redpoint: 5.14a (8b+); Bouldering: V12 (8A+)
- Major ascents: FFA of Plain High Drifter V11 (8A); FFA of The Mandala V12 (8A+); FFA of The End of the Affair (E8 6c); FFA of Gaia (E8 6c)
- Known for: First American female to win an IFSC World Cup stage, and to top the IFSC world female bouldering rankings (2002).; First American female to climb V11, and V12 boulders.; Second-ever female to climb 8A/8A+ (Plain High Drifter).; First-ever female to climb E8.
Medal record
Women's competition climbing
Representing United States
World Cup
Winner	2002	Bouldering
- Updated on 4 February 2022

Lisa Rands (born October 21, 1975) is an American rock climber. She is known for her bouldering for which in 2002, she became the first American female to win IFSC World Cup competition bouldering events, and topped the IFSC world boulder rankings in 2002. Rands was the first American female to climb boulders of grade V11 (8A), and V12 (8A+), and was the second-ever female in history to climb a 7C+/8A boulder. As well as making first female ascents (FFAs) of boulders such as The Mandala V12 (8A+), Rands was the first female in history to do an E8-graded traditional climbing route, The End of the Affair (E8 6c).

== Early life ==
Rands was born in Southern California in 1975, where she grew up. She described herself as a "tomboy" in high school, where she initially focused on athletics and gymnastics, however, in her junior year, a boyfriend introduced her to climbing and bouldering. Rands went on to study geology at California State Polytechnic University, and after moving to Colorado for a new job after graduating, she later returned to her native California to focus on climbing.

== Climbing career ==
=== Competition climbing ===
In December 2001, competing in her first-ever competition climbing event of the IFSC Bouldering World Cup, Rands came 2nd in the Birmingham, England stage. In June 2002, Rands became the first American female climber to win a stage of the IFSC Bouldering World Cup, when she placed first at Lecco, Italy, beating Corine Theroux, and Sandrine Levet. In July 2002, Rands won her second major international competition coming first in the "Open des Ecrins at L'Argentiere", France's longest-running and largest bouldering competition. During 2002, Rands was ranked first in the IFSC world rankings for female bouldering.

Rands won editions of the 2001, and the 2002 Professional Climbers Association (PCA) open bouldering competition in Salt Lake City, and came second in the 2003 PCA in Salt Lake City to Alex Johnson. Rands won the world's longest-running and largest outdoor bouldering competition, the Phoenix Bouldering Competition (PBC), three years running in 2002 (19th edition), 2003 (20th edition), and 2004 (21st edition, which became the Phoenix BoulderBlast). In 2004, Rands won all three stages of the southeast's Triple Crown outdoor bouldering competition, and returned ten years later in 2014, to win all three stages of the Triple Crown series.

=== Bouldering ===
In January 2001, Rands completed the second female ascent, after Lynn Hill, of the classic boulder problem, Midnight Lightning graded V8 (7B/7B+), in Camp 4, in Yosemite; unlike Hill, Rands did not toprope the boulder in advance, and took two days to solve the problem. In March 2001, Rands made the first female ascent (FFA) of Plain High Drifter, becoming the first-ever American female to climb a V11-graded boulder, and only the second-ever female in history to climb a 7C+/8A boulder after French climber Catherine Miquel who ascended Sale gosse assis in 1998. Rands was also featured bouldering in the 2002 climbing film, Dosage Volume 1 (2002), where she discusses her preference for "big guy problems" (e.g. committing intimidating lines with powerful moves).

In July 2002, Rands climbed a second V11 (8A), Du Cote de Seshuan in the Magic Wood, Switzerland, and in March 2003, Rands made the third and fourth-ever female ascent in history, of an 8A/8A+ V11/V12 boulder, solving both Chbalanke and Sarah SDS on successive days at Hueco Tanks in Texas. Rands won an honorable mention in Climbing magazine's 2003 Golden Piton Awards for Bouldering, for her ascents. In 2006 and 2007, Rands made trips to Rocklands, South Africa, where she put up new boulder problems such as Pinotage SDS, Lisa's Arete, and Backbone at V10 (7C+), and did the FFA of classic routes such as Fred Nicole's Nutsa V11 (8A). Her Rocklands climbs have been captured in several climbing films including Specimen (2006), and The Players (2009).

In January 2007, her ground-up ascents of intimidating highball problems in the Buttermilks such as her first female ascent of This Side of Paradise V10 (7C+), were captured in the Sender Films climbing film, The Sharp End (2007). In January 2008, aged 32, Rands became the first female to succeed on Chris Sharma's famous problem from 2008, The Mandala at V12 (8A+). Her highball bouldering and her ascent of The Mandala were featured in two segments of NBC's Jeep World of Adventure Sports, with Rands saying: "Women are perfectly capable of climbing all the hard tall scary things that the guys climb... I really like to put myself out there on the line. 30 feet off the ground you really have to focus to relax yourself. You have to flip your mind back and fourth[sic] from this raw power to a very calm state".

=== Traditional climbing ===
Rands has also repeated some of the most intimidating traditional climbing routes in the sport, and particularly in the English Peak District, where she made many first female ascents, and onsights, of classic gritstone routes, often with her British husband, Wills Young. In September 2003, Rands became only the second female in history to lead an E7-graded traditional route (the first was Airlie Anderson in 1994 on Master's Edge), when she ascended White Lines (E7 6b/c), at Curbar Edge in the Peak District. In October 2004, she became the first female to climb an E8-graded traditional route, when she ascended Johnny Dawes' famous British gritstone test-piece (featured in Hard Grit 1998), The End of the Affair (E8 6c), at Curbar Edge. Rands won Climbing magazine's 2004 Golden Piton Award for Traditional Climbing, for her ascent of the E8 route. In May 2005, she completed the first female ascent of Shine On (E7 6c) at Stanage Edge. In April 2006, she returned to the Peak District, and completed the first female ascent of another Dawes' test-piece, Gaia (E8 6c), at Black Rocks. Her ascent of Gaia is captured in the Big UP Productions climbing film, Dosage Volume 4 (2006).

Rands also extended into big wall climbing, and in 2005, made a fast all-free ascent of the 20 pitch 727-metre grade IV, 5.10+ route Chiaro di Luna, on the northwest face of Aguja Saint Exupery in Patagonia. She has also put up new traditional multi-pitch alpine routes with big wall climbing legend Peter Croft, such as Gargoyle (5.11b), and Flying Buttress (5.11a) in 2011 on Merriam Peak. In 2010, the duo climbed the 10 pitch 364-metre grade IV, 5.12d+ route The Venturi Effect on The Incredible Hulk granite wall in the High Sierras, which was captured in the film, Reel Rock 5 (2010).

== Personal life ==
Rands lived in Bishop, California for over 14 years with her Californian-born, British-raised husband, Wills Young, who is also an extreme rock climber, rock climbing writer (for Climbing, Rock & Ice, and Outside magazines), and rock climbing guidebook writer (including Bishop Bouldering, 2007). They moved to Chattanooga, Tennessee, where they run a climbing gym, and a climbing coaching and performance school, that Climbing magazine ranked as one of America's top 10 climbing gyms in 2016.

== Bibliography ==
- Women Who Dare: North America's Most Inspiring Women Climbers (Chris Noble), 2013, Falcon Guides. page 195–209. ISBN 978-0762783717.

== Filmography ==
- Rands and Peter Croft on The Venturi Effect: Josh Lowell (director) (2010). Reel Rock 5 (Motion picture). Sender Films. ASIN B007CMFLBM.
- Rands bouldering in Rocklands: Brian Solano (director) (2009). The Players (Motion picture). BS Productions. ASIN B00279JW06.
- Rands highball bouldering in the Buttermilks: Peter Mortimer, Nick Rosen (director) (2007). The Sharp End (Motion picture). Sender Films. ASIN B007CMFLA8.
- Rands bouldering in Rocklands: Chuck Fryberger (director) (2006). Specimen (Motion picture). Sona Records. ASIN B000M9BPLM.
- Rands climbing Gaia (E8 6c): Josh Lowell (director) (2006). Dosage Volume IV (Motion picture). Big UP Productions. ASIN B000JQK8BG.
- Rands bouldering in France: Rob Frost, Jack Tracy (director) (2002). Autoroute (Motion picture). Second Chance Films. ASIN B000NO20BK.
- Rands bouldering in the Buttermilks: Josh Lowell (director) (2002). Dosage Volume I (Motion picture). Big UP Productions. ASIN B000NOK288.

== See also ==
- List of grade milestones in rock climbing
- History of rock climbing
- Rankings of most career IFSC gold medals
- Angie Payne, American bouldering climber
- Alex Puccio, American bouldering climber
- Alex Johnson, American bouldering climber
