= Derbyshire Portway =

Trackway in the Peak District, England

The Derbyshire Portway, also known as Old Manchester Lane or The Chariot Way, is a pre-historic trackway that runs for over 40 miles across the Peak District of England.

== History ==
The well-known section of the trackway runs from Mam Tor in north Derbyshire through the Peak District via Wirksworth to the Hemlock Stone near Nottingham and is said to have existed since the Bronze Age before falling out of regular use in the Middle Ages. However, there is evidence to suggest that the trackway originally extended to Manchester at the northern end and to Nottingham in the midlands.

The trackway takes in several historic locations, amongst others:

- Mam Tor
- Robin Hood's Stride
- Nine Stones Close
- Alport Height
- Dale Abbey
- Hemlock Stone

The Portway was the subject of a 2017 episode of the Channel 4 programme Britain's Ancient Tracks with Tony Robinson.
