= Burbage Rocks =

Hill in the English Peak District

Coordinates: 53°20′13″N 1°35′56″W

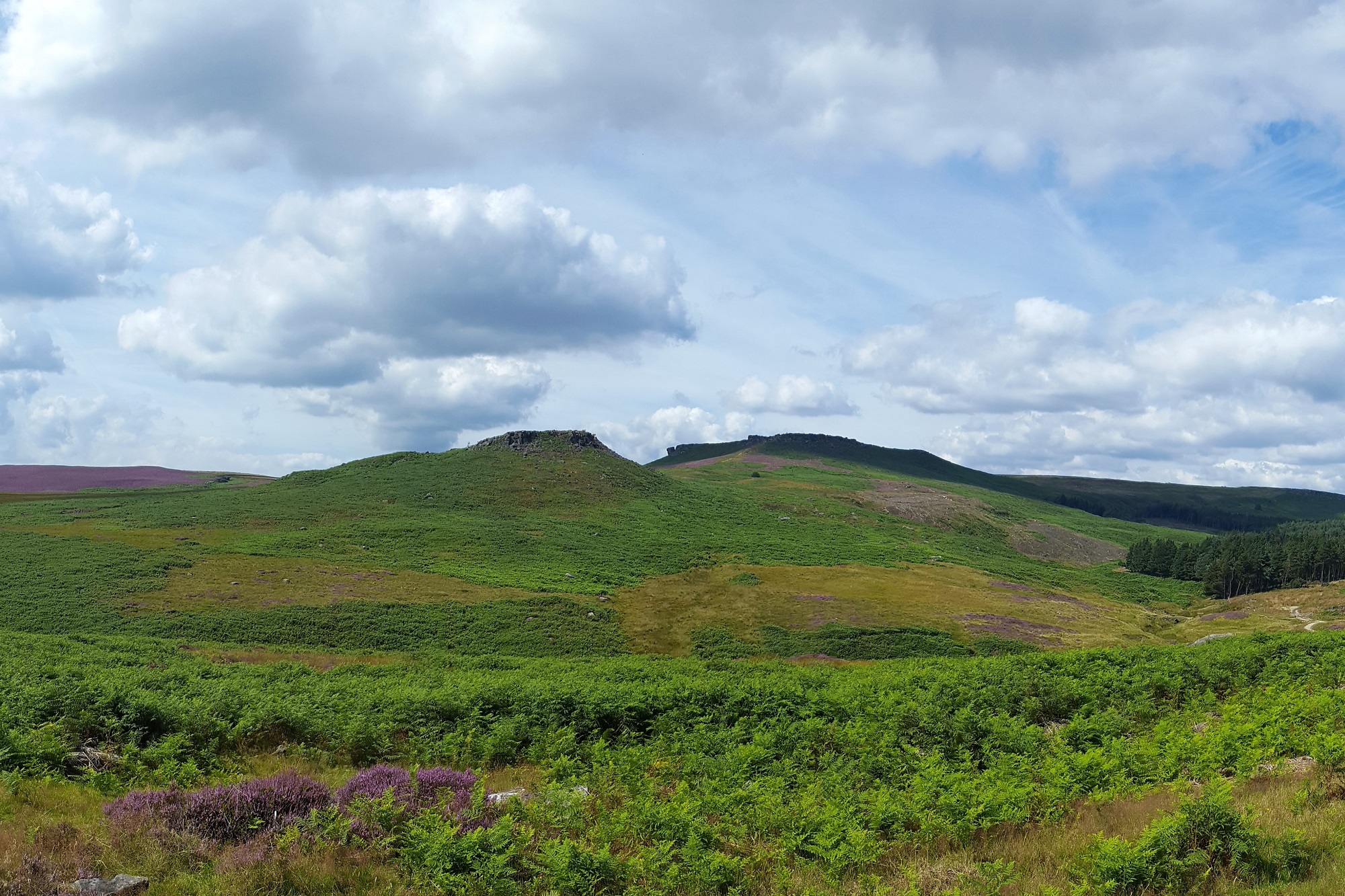
- Carl Wark and Burbage Rocks

Highest point
- Elevation: 429 metres (1,407 ft)

Geography
- Location: Peak District, England
- OS grid: SK 268823
- Topo map: OS Explorer OL1

Burbage Rocks is a gritstone escarpment in South Yorkshire, overlooking the village of Hathersage in the Peak District. The highest point along the escarpment is 429 metres (1,407 ft) above sea level, whilst Burbage Moor rises above to 438 metres (1,437 ft). Burbage Rocks is a southern extension of Stanage Edge. Burbage Brook runs from the northern end of the Burbage Rocks, past the southern end, through Padley Gorge and into the RIver Derwent.

The gritstone edge of Burbage Rocks is a popular rock climbing location. The Burbage Rocks North area is close to a car park and has 481 graded routes including many short, easy routes. The quieter Burbage South Edge area has 289 graded routes with much more challenging, long buttress climbs. Burbage South Quarries has a further 108 graded routes. The following routes on Burbage South Edge were climbed in the 1998 rock-climbing film Hard Grit:

- Samson (E8 7b) climbed by Jerry Moffatt
- Braille Trail (E7 6c) climbed by Dave Jones
- Parthian Shot (E9 7a) climbed by Seb Grieve

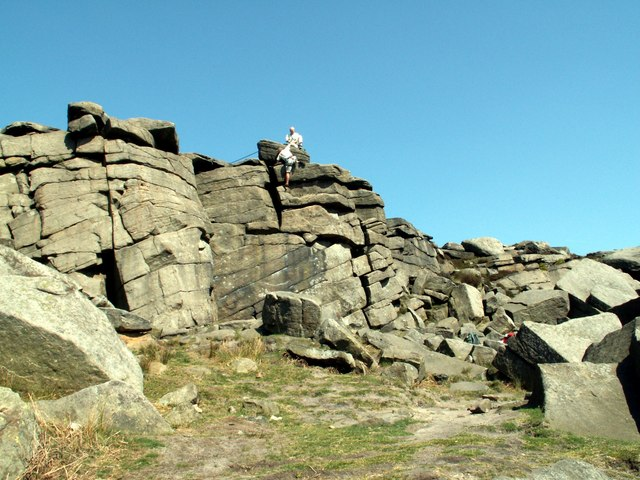
Climbers at Burbage Rocks North

Below Burbage Rocks (on Hathersage Moor to the west) are the hill Higger Tor and Carl Wark, the rocky platform of an Iron Age hillfort, which is a scheduled monument.

Sheffield Country Walk is a 86 kilometres (53 mi) long trail which runs along the public footpath below the edge. Following the Countryside and Rights of Way Act 2000, the area of Burbage Rocks and surrounding moorland were designated as "Open Access" land for the public.
