= Peter Harding (climber) =

British rock climber (1924–2007)

Peter Reginald James Harding (30 December 1924 – 24 October 2007) was a British rock climber who was prominent in the development of traditional climbing in Britain during the period following World War II.

== Climbing career ==
Harding was born in Nottingham but raised in the East Midlands and took his first job as an apprentice at the Rolls-Royce factory in Derby. He was inspired to climb during a cycling holiday in Snowdonia in late 1943, and the following January he bought a cotton rope and began to visit the crags of the nearby Peak District with his girlfriend and climbing partner Veronica Lee. By the following summer, Harding was one of the leading climbers in the Peak District, and was beginning to make first ascents of his own, including many routes now regarded as mid-grade classics. The first of these was Promontory Traverse at Black Rocks, now graded at E1 5b, and which crosses a large overhanging prow. This was followed by routes such as Goliath's Groove at Stanage Edge, the first route to be graded "Exceptionally Severe (XS)", and Suicide Wall at Cratcliffe Tor in 1946, to which he gave the same grade. While modern protection has made Suicide Wall safer than it was for Harding, it is still regarded as one of Britain's most exciting rock climbs.

In 1947, Peter Harding moved to Shrewsbury where he became a lecturer in engineering at the technical college and began to climb in North Wales. He made numerous first ascents there, the most important of which was Spectre (HVS 5a) and Ivy Sepulchre (E1 5b) in the Llanberis Pass, which would remain among the hardest routes in the area for the next decade.

== Legacy ==
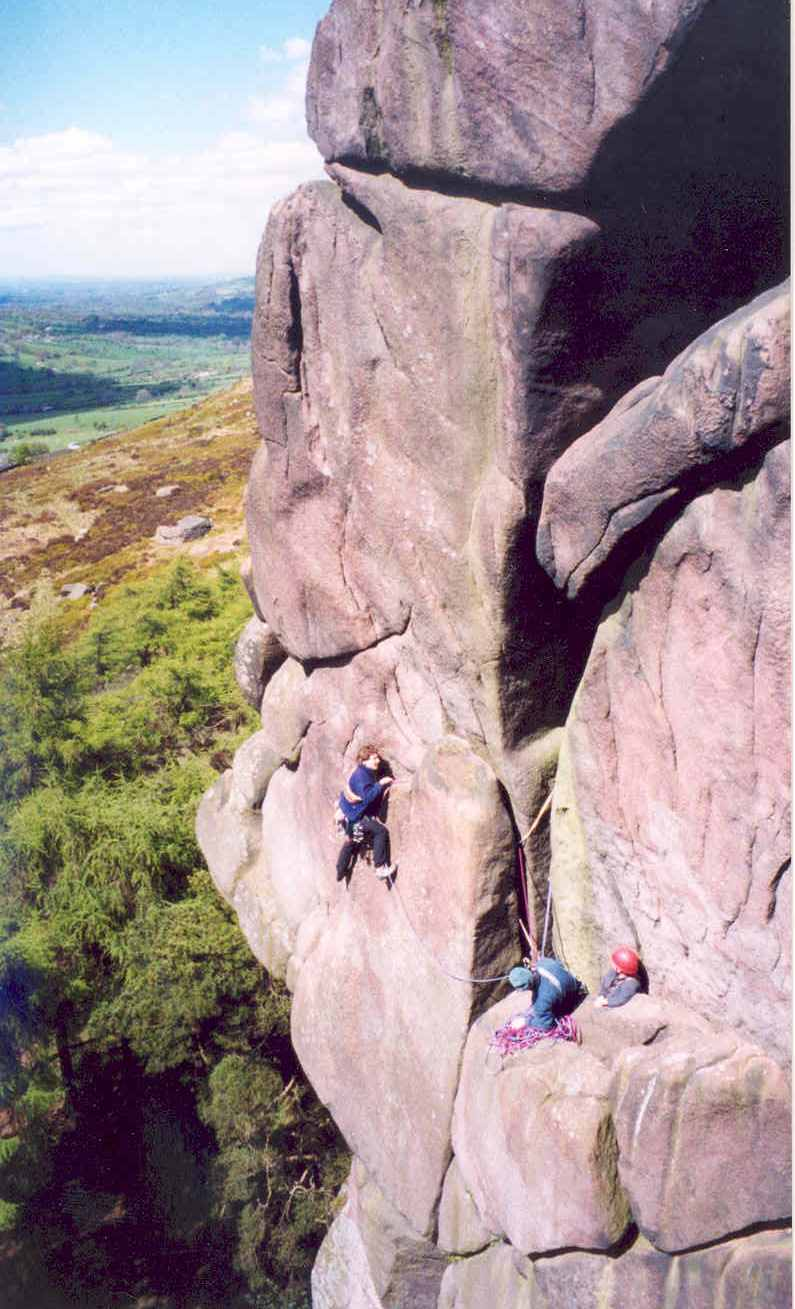
Climbers on Valkyrie (VS 4c) at The Roaches. Harding made the first free ascent of the route in 1946.

Harding's most important contribution to the climbing technique was to perfect and popularise the hand jam; a method of climbing cracks using the fleshy part of the thumb in conjunction with the back of the hand to grip the inner part of the crack. He is sometimes credited with inventing the technique, though it is more likely that he rediscovered a method that had been used occasionally since the late 19th century. However, he did much to promote the use of hand jams at a time when most climbers preferred to climb fist-width cracks by tiring laybacking, or by forcing their hands against opposite sides of the crack, as if opening sliding doors. Using the hand jam, Harding claimed, it was possible to hang comfortably from one hand while smoking a cigarette with the other – and he would regularly demonstrate this.

Harding also introduced new European aid climbing to Britain, which had previously been regarded as unsporting by British climbers. His most important route in this respect was Kaisergebirge Wall (HVS 5b) in the Llanberis Pass which he climbed in 1948 and which presaged the increased acceptance of the use of pitons in the 1950s.

In his professional life, Harding took an interest in rock-climbing equipment, and a large amount of data was generated from his experiments on karabiners, ropes and pitons in his workshop.

== Later life ==
Harding's time at the peak of British traditional climbing was relatively short. He climbed his last major new route in 1949 with Demon Rib at Black Rocks; possibly his most difficult route of all, which is now graded at E3 5c. However, by 1950 his family and career had begun to take priority over climbing, and a new generation of climbers, led by Joe Brown and Don Whillans, took over.

Harding left teaching in 1951 to work on brake linings at Small & Parkes, and later Mintex, where he eventually became a Research and Development Manager and produced many technical papers on the braking of road vehicles. This job allowed him to indulge his interest in motor racing, and he became a regular rally driver. He continued to climb into his seventies, and in 1994 surprised many younger climbers by making a solo ascent of the difficult "Younggrat Route" on the Breithorn.
