= The Mandala =

Bouldering route in California

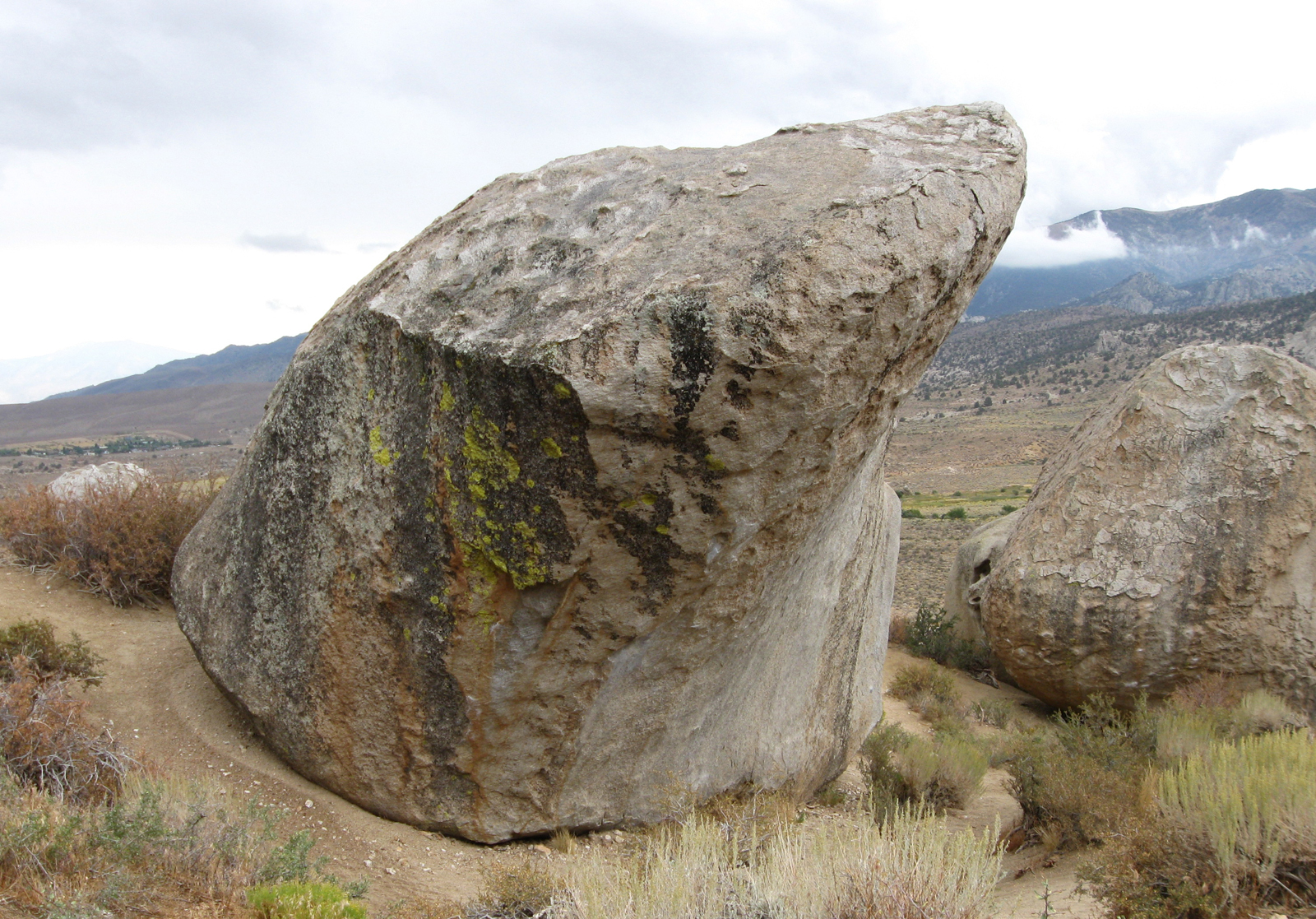
- The Mandala boulder

- Location within California
- Location: Bishop, California
- Coordinates: 37°17′40″N 118°36′36″W
- Climbing area: The Buttermilks
- Route type: Bouldering
- Rock type: Granite
- Vertical gain: 6-metre (20 ft)
- Technical grade: V12 (8A+)
- First free ascent: Chris Sharma, 2000
- First female free ascent: Lisa Rands, 2008

The Mandala is a 6-metre (20 ft) high granite bouldering route in the Buttermilks, a popular bouldering area near Bishop, California. Considered a "next generation" problem in the 1970s, the route was first solved by American climber Chris Sharma in February 2000. It is one of the most widely known boulder problems in the world and is graded at V12 (8A+), and the sit start variation is graded at V14 (8B+).

== History ==
The Mandala bouldering problem climbs a steep overhanging prow on a large granite boulder that, for many decades, was considered too difficult and futuristic to solve; the boulder itself contains several notable bouldering routes including Pope's Prow at a grade of V6 (7A).

In 2008, Climbing magazine recounted a story from the 1970s where John Bachar and Ron Kauk reportedly joked that the line [then unnamed] would one day fall to John Gill's grandchildren, and describing it as a boulder that "to this day remains one of the most coveted and storied problems in American bouldering".

It was first climbed by Chris Sharma in February 2000. Sharma's ascent received much acclaim in the climbing community, however, he did not assign the problem a grade. The boulder was repeated by other climbers several months later in quick succession, the first being American boulder pioneer Dave Graham, the second was by Jared Roth, and the third repeat was by Swiss bouldering pioneer Fred Nicole; and the consensus grade was settled at V12 (8A+). Since the first ascent, several holds have broken, including one of the crux holds. In 2002, Tony Lamiche completed the first flash of the route. In January 2008, Lisa Rands made the first female ascent, and in 2011, Alex Johnson made the second female ascent.

The Mandala became one of the most widely known boulder problems in the world, and its notability means that even contemporary ascents of the boulder are often covered by the climbing media.

== Variations ==
In 2002, a sit start (SDS) was added by Tony Lamiche, which is graded at V14 (8B+), and is sometimes referred to as The Mandaloin, or The Mandala SDS. In 2007, Jeff Silcox added a more intimidating direct finish (avoiding the left escape near the top of the prow), to create The Mandala Direct, still graded V12 (8A+). Later in 2007, Paul Robinson, added the sit-down-start to Silcox's route, making the first ascent of The Mandala Direct Assis, graded V14 (8B+).

== Ascents ==
The Mandala has been ascended by:

- 1st. Chris Sharma in February 2000.
- 2nd. Dave Graham in 2000.
- 3rd. Jared Roth in 2000.
- 4th. Fred Nicole in 2000.

First female free ascents (FFFA):

- 1st. Lisa Rands in January 2008.
- 2nd. Alex Johnson in January 2011.

== Filmography ==
- Chris Sharma's first ascent: Lowell, Josh (director) (11 February 2012). Dosage Volume I (Motion picture). Big UP Productions. ASIN B000NOK288.

== See also ==
- Dreamtime, famous V15 (8C) boulder in Cresciano, Switzerland
- Midnight Lightning, famous V8 (7B/7B+) boulder in Camp 4 (Yosemite)
- The Wheel of Life, famous V15 (8C) boulder in the Grampians, Australia
