= Black Rocks (Derbyshire) =

Rock climbing area in England

- Stonnis Rocks
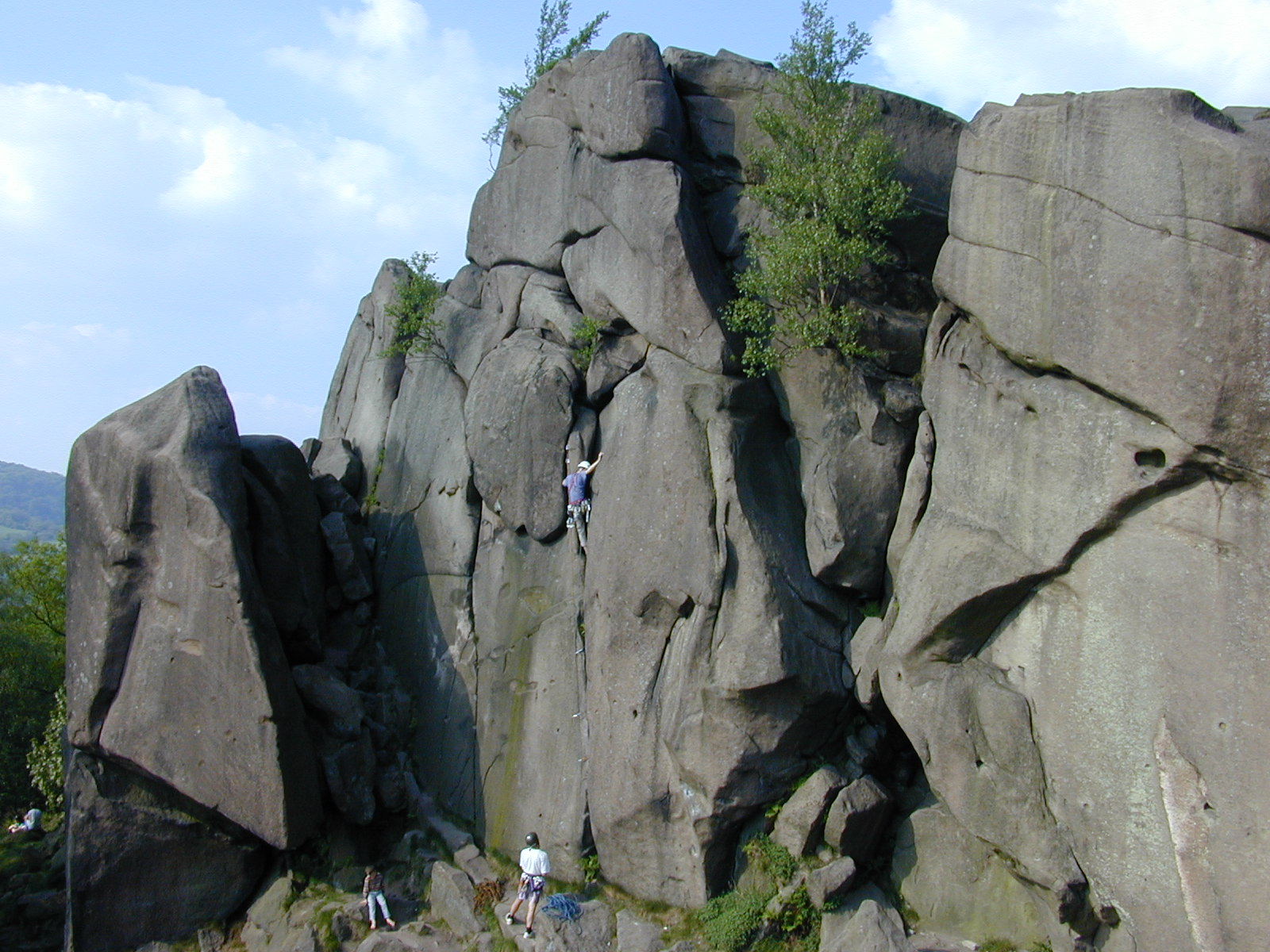
- Gaia (E8 6c, 5.13a X) follows the groove on the outcrop at the left of the picture

- Location within Derbyshire
- Location: Peak District, Derbyshire
- Nearest city: Cromford
- Coordinates: 53.0982°N 1.5637°W
- Type of climbing: Traditional climbing, Bouldering
- Height range: 5–35 metres (16–115 ft)
- Pitches range: Mostly single-pitch
- Technical grades: Rock grades of Diff to E9 (most are above E1); Bouldering of V0 to V9
- Rock type: Gritstone
- Quantity of routes: +224 routes
- Cliff aspect: Northwest
- Elevation: 278 metres (912 ft) a.s.l.
- Guidebook: Froggatt to Black Rocks (2010); Eastern Grit (2022)
- Classic climbs: Meshuga (E9 6c, 5.13a X), Gaia (E8 6c, 5.13a X), Curving Arete (E5 6b), Lean Man's Climb (VS 5a), Birch Tree Wall (VS 4c), Sand Buttress (VS 4c), Angel's Share 7C (V9); King Edward 7C (V9); Velvet Silence 7A+ (V7)

Black Rocks (or Stonnis Rocks), is a small outcrop of ashover gritstone, between Cromford and Wirksworth in Derbyshire, the Peak District, England. It is an important crag in the history of British rock climbing, and has some of the most extreme climbing routes in Britain, including Gaia E8 6c.

== Climbing history ==
The crag has been a well-known traditional climbing venue since the 1890s, and features in the early 1913 guidebook, Some Gritstone Climbs. Black Rocks has some easier traditional climbing routes of grades Diff to VS 4c, and a selection of short bouldering problems of grades V0 (4) to V9 (7C), however, it is most noted for its historic extreme traditional climbing routes put up in the mid-1980s to the early 2000s. Its northerly aspect means that it is frequently in damp condition (and even covered in green algae), however, the sandstone-like gritstone rock dries reasonably quickly.

Important names in British climbing history have left their mark at Black Rocks such as James W. Puttrel (Stonnis Crack HVS 4b, 1900), Fred Pigott (Sand Buttress VS 4c, 1920), and Peter Harding (Demon Rib E4 5c, 1949, and Promontory Traverse E1 5b, 1945).

The two best-known Black Rocks climbs are Gaia (E8 6c, 5.13a X), whose first free ascent was by Johnny Dawes in 1986), and Meshuga (E9 6c, 5.13a X), whose first free ascent was by Seb Grieve in 1997), which are located on the main overhanging promontory section. Both climbs are featured in several climbing films including Stone Monkey (1988) capturing Dawes first ascent of Gaia, Hard Grit (1998) in which French climber Jean-Minh Trin-Thieu takes a large fall on Gaia, and Dosage Volume 4 (2006), in which American climber Lisa Rands made the first female ascent of Gaia. In 2008, American climbers Kevin Jorgeson and Alex Honnold, both completed free solos of Meshuga, while Honnold also completed the first-ever flash of Gaia.

In November 2000, Charlie Woodburn completed a direct finish to Gaia called Harder, Faster, and graded it E9 7a; a fall from the crux near the top would likely be fatal, and it is thus considered one of the most dangerous climbs in Britain, and rarely repeated, with only its third ascent in December 2020.

== Filmography ==
- Rands on Gaia: Josh Lowell (director) (2006). Dosage Volume IV (Motion picture). Big UP Productions. ASIN B000JQK8BG.
- Hardest Peak District: Heap, Richard (director) (1998). Hard Grit (Motion picture). Slackjaw Film. ASIN B000VY46PU.
- Dawes' FFA of Gaia: Williams, Huw (director) (1988). Stone monkey: Portrait of a rock climber (Motion picture). Hughes Film.

== Bibliography ==
- Froggatt to Black Rocks (Dave Westlake), June 2010, British Mountaineering Council. ISBN 978-0903908092.
- Eastern Grit, 3rd Edition (Chris Craggs), April 2015, RockFax. ISBN 978-1873341087.

== Gallery ==
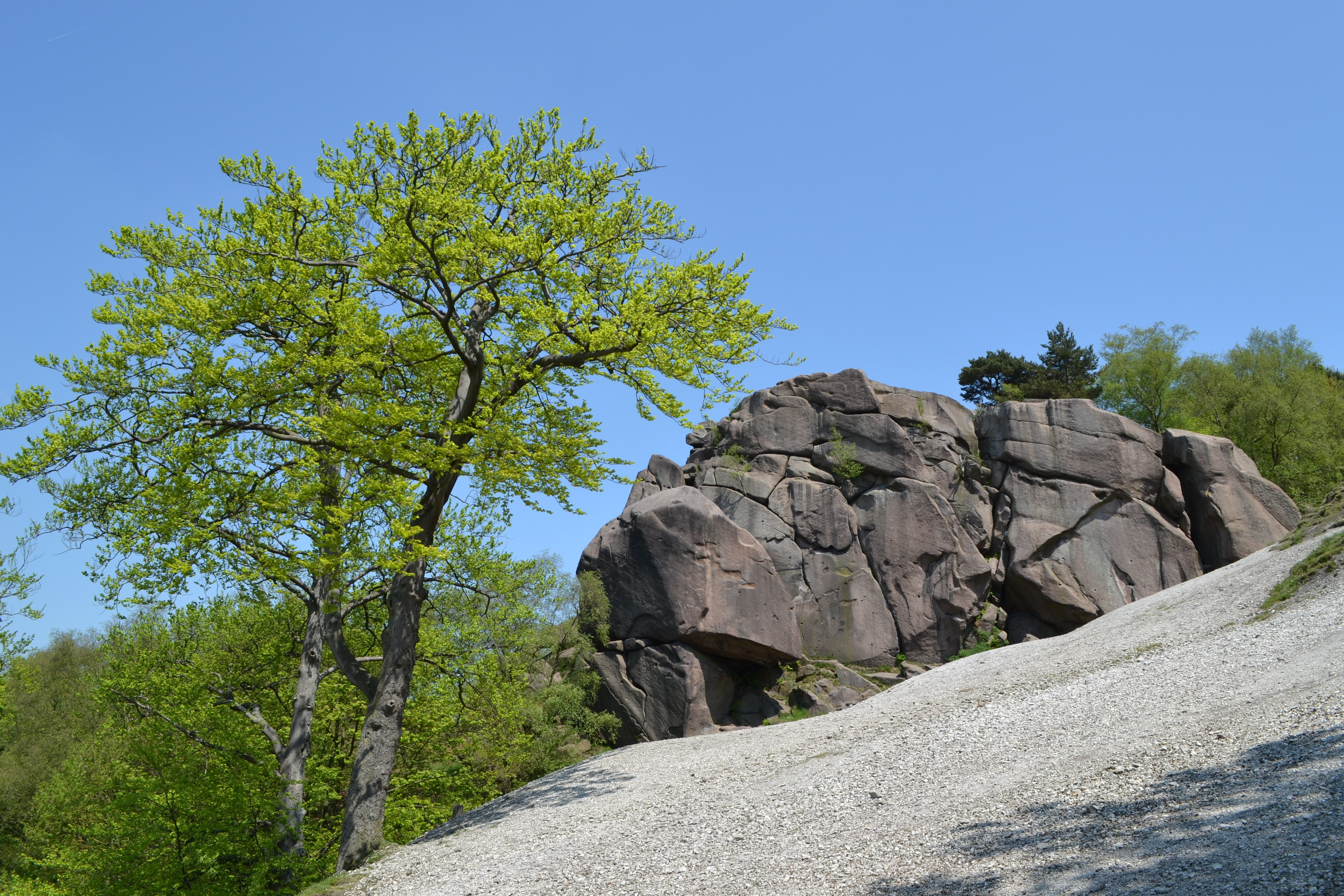
Approaching crag, Gaia on left.

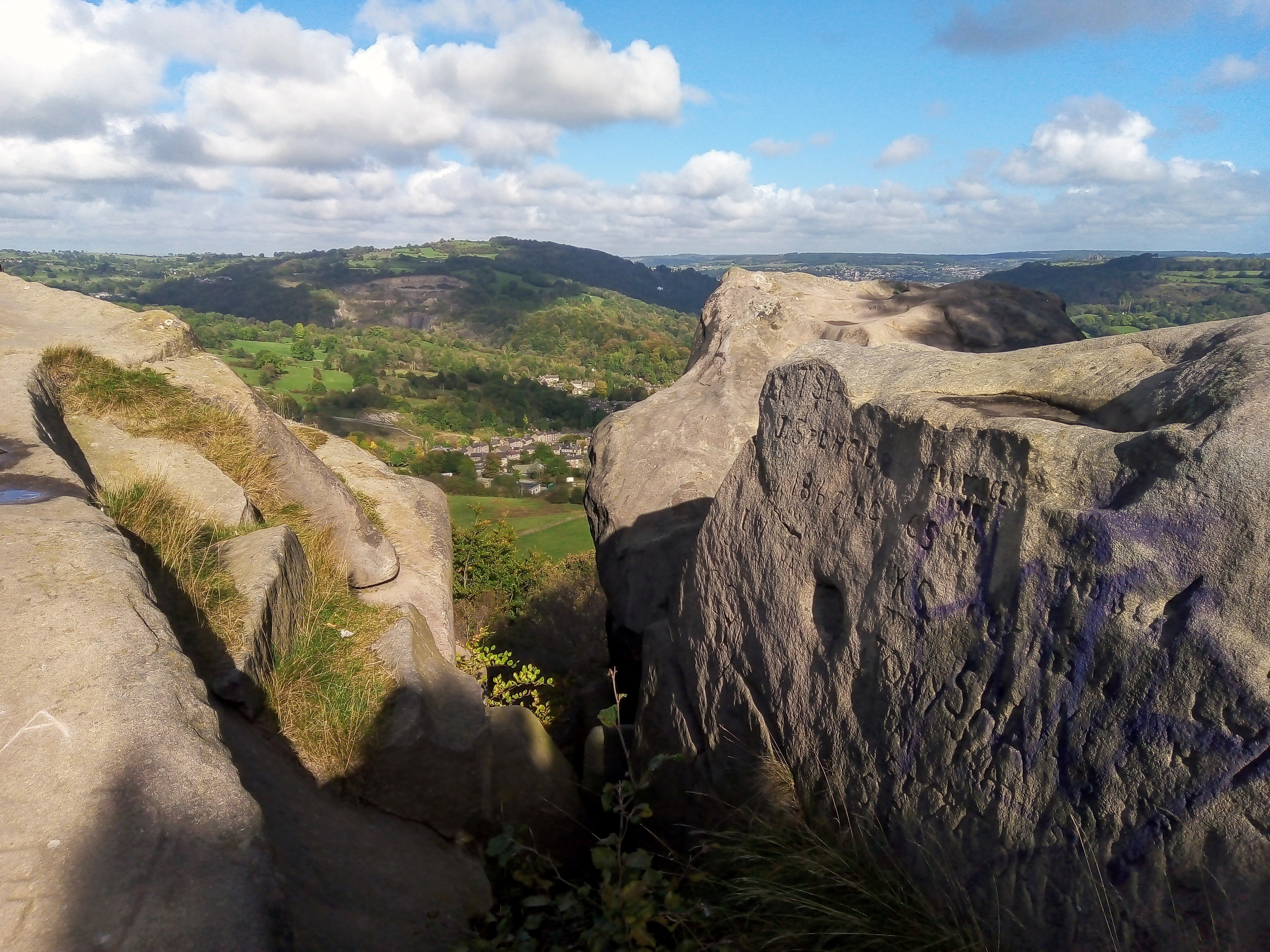
View from the top, 2021.

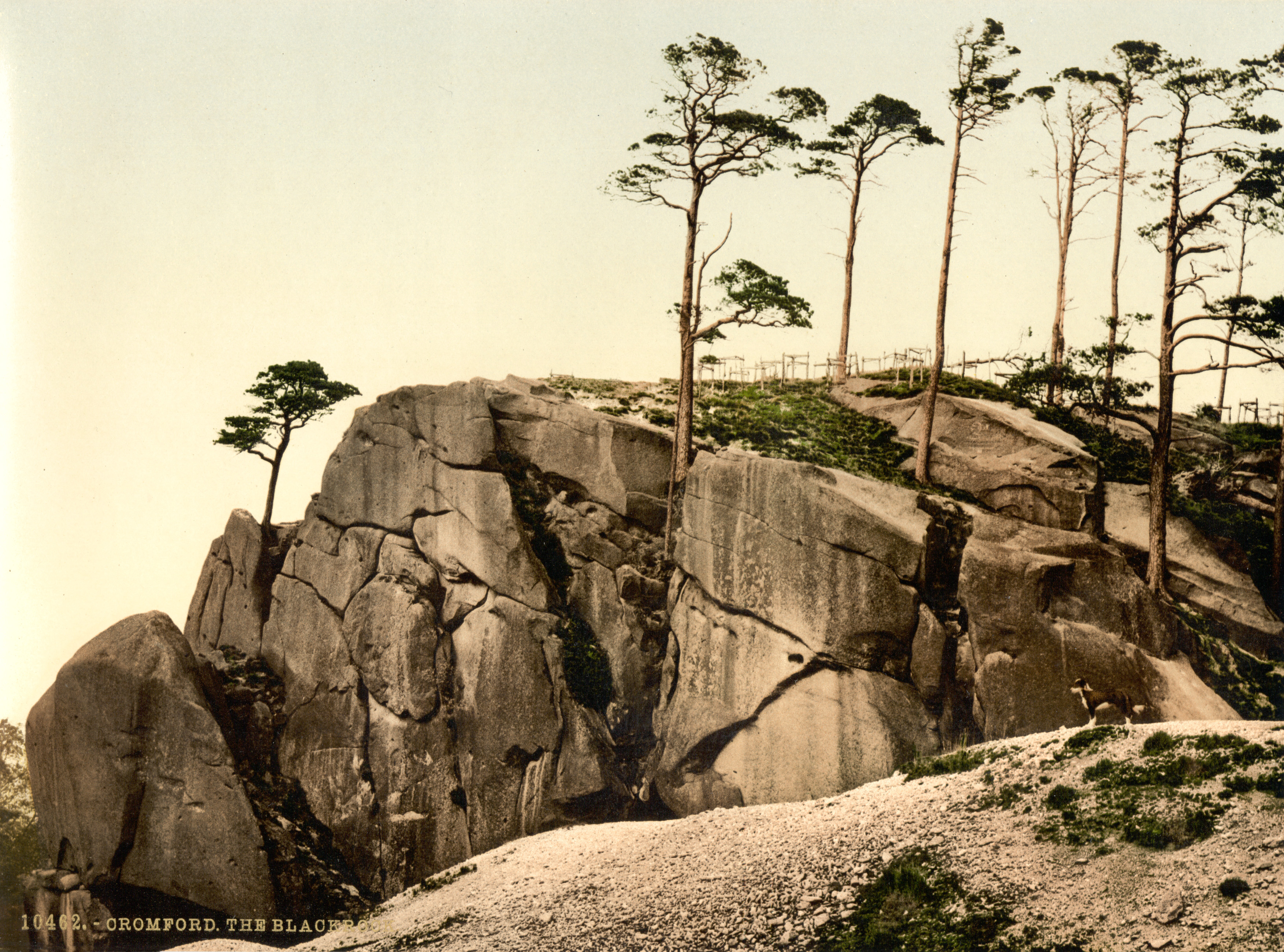
Black Rocks, 1890s.

== See also ==
- Rock climbing in the Peak District
