= Master's Edge =

Traditional climbing route in England

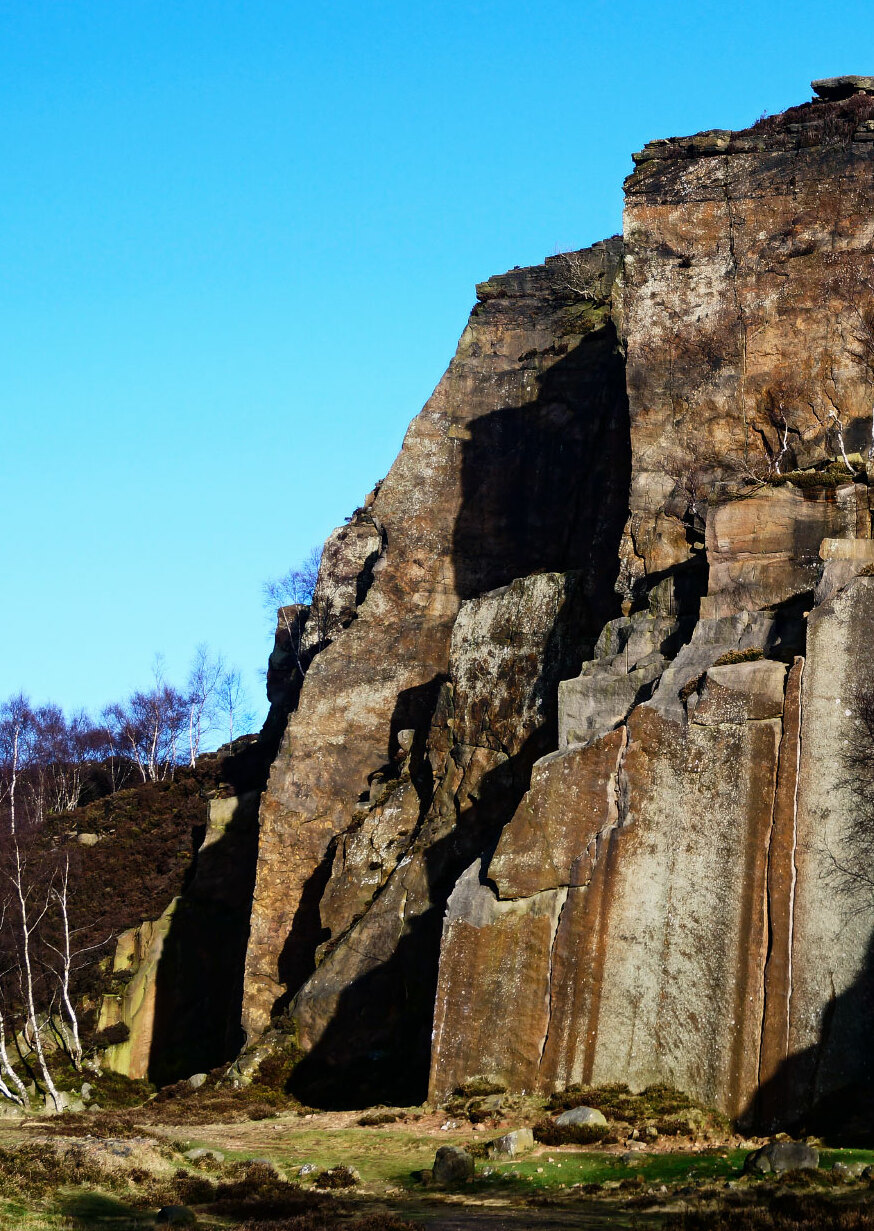
- Master's Edge is the brightly coloured arete left of centre, "Embankment Wall" is the brightly coloured face at right of centre, Millstone Edge.

- Location within England
- Location: Hathersage, Derbyshire
- Coordinates: 53°19′16″N 1°37′45″W
- Climbing area: Millstone Edge quarry,
- Route type: Traditional climbing
- Rock type: Gritstone
- Vertical gain: 18 metres (59 ft)
- Pitches: 1
- Technical grade: E7 6c (British); 5.12d R/X (American)
- First free ascent: Ron Fawcett; 29 December 1983
- First female free ascent: Airlie Anderson; September 1994
- First onsight/flash ascent: Liam Hasley (2004, flash); Alex Honnold (2009, onsight)

Master's Edge is an 18-metre (59 ft) traditional climbing route on a gritstone arête in the "Corners Area" of Millstone Edge quarry, in the Peak District, England. When English climber Ron Fawcett completed the first free ascent of the route on 29 December 1983, it was graded E7 6c, and one of the hardest traditional climbing routes in the world; it remains one of the hardest gritstone climbs.

== History ==
Fawcett's rival, English climber Jerry Moffatt, had been top-roping the route earlier that year, waiting for the right conditions to lead it, and had said that: "anyone who could do this climb without abseiling down it first, or practicing it on a top rope, would be a true master".

In his biography, Fawcett said that by late 1983, he was desperate to find a bold new route and that someone had mentioned that Moffatt had been working on a new climb just below Great Arete (E5 5c), at Millstone Edge, and had already called it Master's Edge (in January 1983, Moffatt had freed a major new route he called Master's Wall E7 6b at Clogwyn Du'r Arddu). While only 28 at the time, Fawcett remarked that "I was starting to feel part of an older generation whose time was passing, Master's Edge might give me the chance to turn the clock back a little". Fawcett, belayed by his wife Gill, completed the route in one day on 29 December 1983 after taking a few attempts, and one serious fall that was arrested by his new Amigo protection but without the aid of top-roping. Fawcett said that Moffatt was pretty upset, but in the era before sport climbing in Britain (i.e. where climbers would take time to install bolts onto a route), "it was a free for all".

Described as "Fawcett's Masterpiece", the route remained a serious and intimidating undertaking for even the greatest climbers, and it wasn't until 2004 that English climber Liam Halsey completed the first flash of the route (although with some falls). In the 1990s, German climber Wolfgang Gullich broke his back in a fall on the route when testing his protective gear. In September 1994, 19-year old Airlie Anderson made the first female free ascent of the route, (Note: Anderson punched a man to the floor in her own local pub when he questioned whether she had used too many safety mats during her ascent.) and became the first-ever female to climb an E7. In 2009, American climber Alex Honnold, onsighted Master's Edge, and in an interview afterwards said that he found the route "hard", "sustained", and "scary". (Note: When the American Alpine Club named Honnold as its 2009 Robert Hicks Bates award winner, his 2009 on-sight of Master's Edge was cited in their announcement.)

While the route retains its "E7" grade due to the extreme level of risk, the technical difficulty has been lowered slightly from 6c to 6b; however, flashes are still rare enough to be worthy of capture in the climbing media, an example being English climber Nathan Lee's 2016 flash of what Rock & Ice described as the "ultra-classic", Master's Edge.

== Filmography ==
- Major climbs in Peak District: Pope, Jim (director) (2020). Big Balls & Ground Falls (Motion picture).
- Shows Swedish climber Richard Ekehed on Master's Edge : Heap, Richard (director) (1998). Hard Grit (Motion picture). Slackjaw Film.

== See also ==
- History of rock climbing
- Hubble, first grade 8c+ (5.14c) in the world, Raven Tor, Peak District, England
- Hard Grit, a 1998 film on Peak District extreme gritstone routes
- Indian Face, first E9-graded traditional climb in the world at Clogwyn Du'r Arddu, Wales
- Rhapsody (climb), first grade E11-graded traditional climb in the world at Dumbarton, Scotland
