= Robin Hood's Stride =

Rock formation in Derbyshire, England

Robin Hood's Stride Mock Beggar's Mansion
- Rock formation
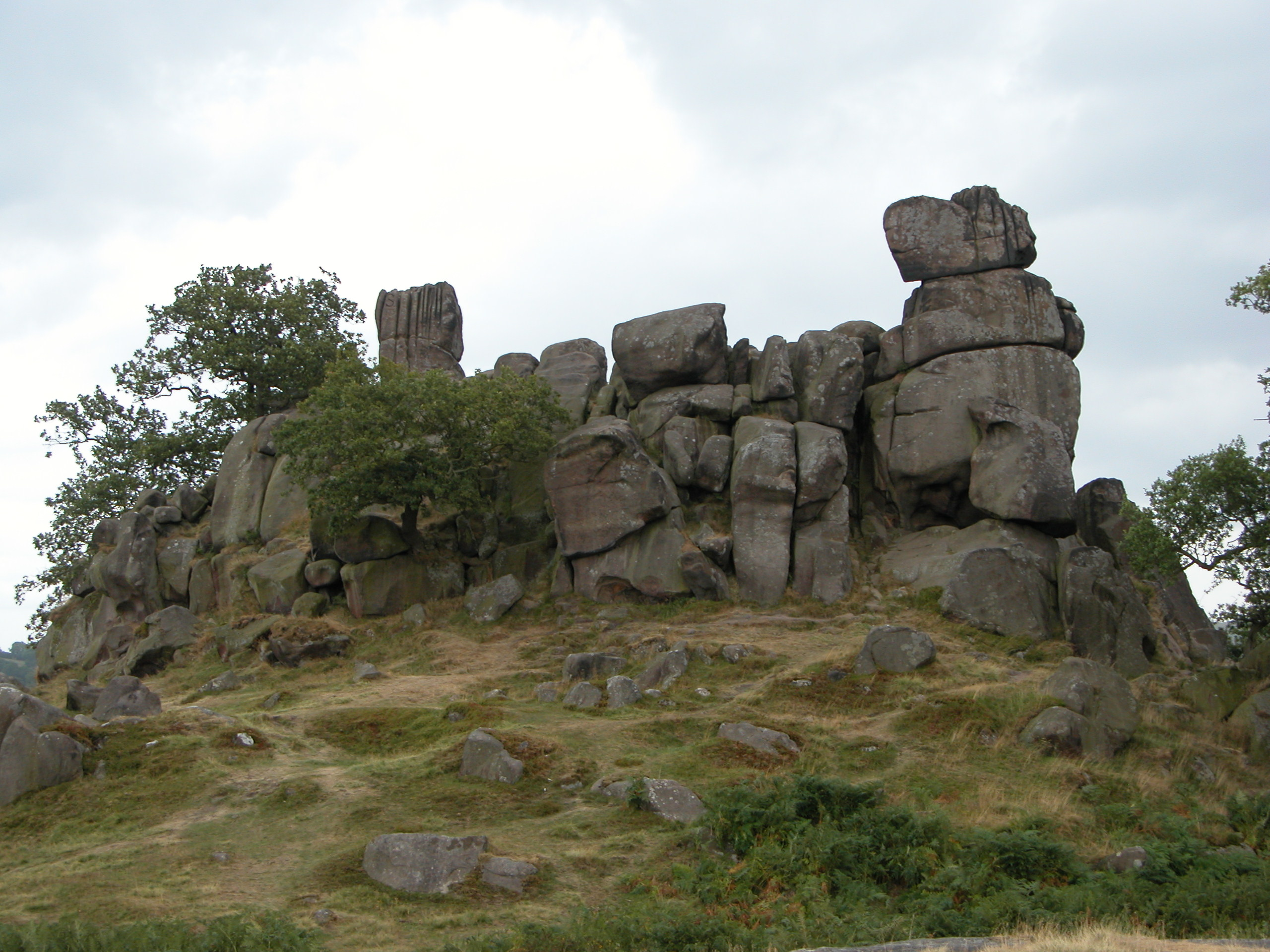
- North-eastern face

- Location within Derbyshire
- Coordinates: 53.1571°N 1.6661°W
- Location: near Elton, Derbyshire
- Geology: Gritstone
- Elevation: 251 metres (823 ft)

Robin Hood's Stride (also known as Mock Beggar's Mansion) is a rock formation on the Limestone Way in Derbyshire close to the village of Elton. The nearest town is Bakewell, to the north. It consists of gritstone boulders deeply seamed by water flows. The two "pinnacles" are Weasel pinnacle (eastern end; Diff) and Inaccessible pinnacle (west; V Diff). An ancient road, possibly prehistoric or Roman, the Derbyshire Portway, passes close to the outcrop. Nearby is Nine Stones Close, a four-stone circle, and, at Cratcliffe Tor, a rock shelter known as the Hermit's Cave, containing a crucifix carving dated stylistically to the 13th or 14th century. The name Robin Hood's Stride comes from the 14th-century legend that Robin Hood jumped between the chimneys of the rock formation.

The popular tourist spot can be accessed via the Limestone Way just off the B5056 between Haddon Hall and Winster, or from the unclassified road from Alport to Elton via either the Limestone Way, a concessionary footpath, or Access Land. Limited short climbing is possible; nearby Cratcliffe Tor provides more serious routes.

== In popular culture ==
Robin Hood's Stride features in an episode of The Return of Sherlock Holmes and the film The Princess Bride (1987).
