= Hemlock Stone =

Sandstone outcrop in Nottinghamshire

Hemlock Stone Himlack Stone
- Inselberg
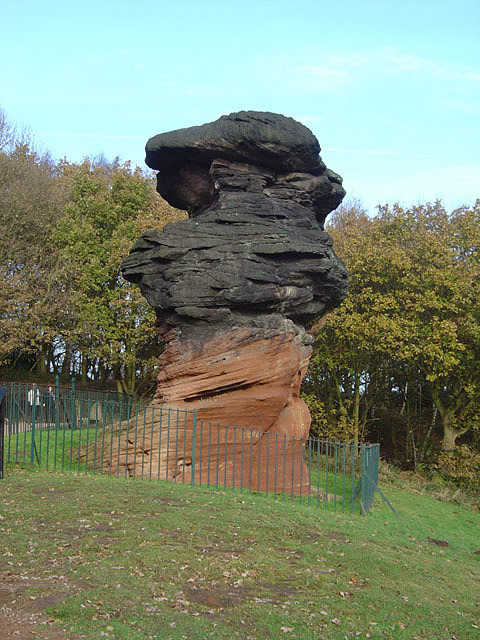

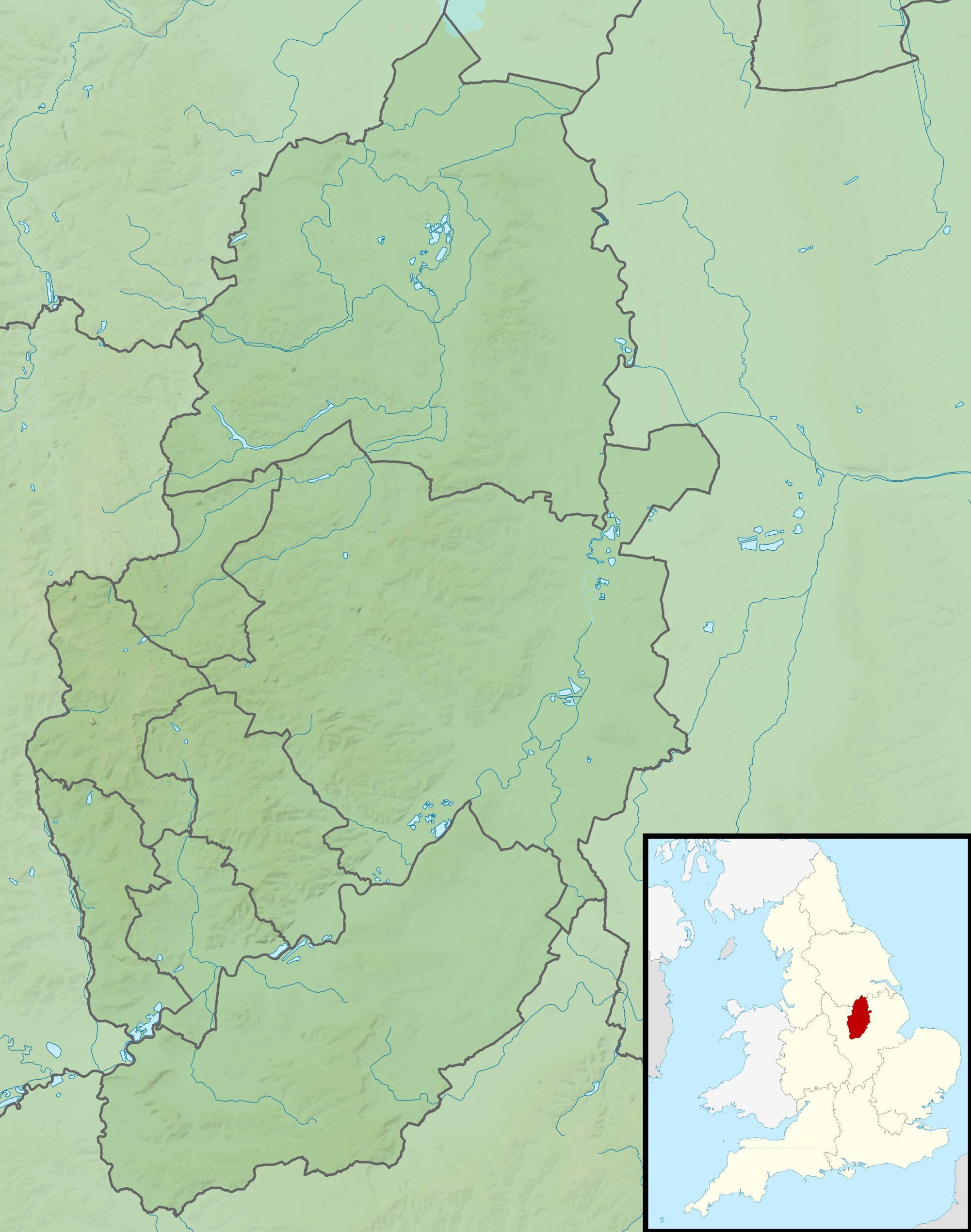
- Location within Nottinghamshire
- Coordinates: 52°56′34.93″N 1°15′29.14″W
- Location: Stapleford Hill, Stapleford, Nottinghamshire, England

The Hemlock Stone or Himlack Stone is an inselberg on Stapleford Hill at Stapleford, Nottinghamshire, England.

== Geology ==
The Hemlock Stone is an outcrop of New Red Sandstone, deposited more than 200 million years ago in the Triassic Period. Approximately 28 feet (8.5 m) high, it is formed of a layer of Nottingham Castle Sandstone overlying a layer of Lenton Sandstone. Both layers are members of the Sherwood Sandstone Group. The Nottingham Castle Sandstone is a medium- to coarse-grained sandstone in which the grains are strongly cemented together by baryte. The Lenton Sandstone is very fine-grained but less well cemented together. As a result, the lower part of the stone is more vulnerable to erosion than the upper part, resulting in differential erosion that has given the inselberg its current "waisted" shape.

There are two geological theories as to what removed the surrounding sandstone layers of which the inselberg was once a part. In the 18th century the antiquarian William Stukeley (1687–1765) proposed that it had been left by quarrying of the surrounding stone. Certainly there are signs of past quarrying on and around Stapleford Hill. In 1908 the Ordnance Geological Survey (OGS) propounded that it was the result purely of natural differential erosion, particularly by ice in the Quaternary glaciation. The British Geological Survey, the OGS's modern successor, now supports Stukeley's theory.

In October 2015 with the University of Nottingham's Geospatial Institute undertook further study, as part of their "Three Stones Project". Since, in the past, laser mapping had not completely covered the stone, they employed a drone equipped with laser mapping cameras.

Black grime coats the Nottingham Castle Sandstone that forms the upper part of the inselberg, but there is none on the Lenton Sandstone below. The deposit is from industrial air pollution before the UK started to restrict air pollution, and illustrates the fact that the upper layer has eroded much more slowly than the lower. Wind erosion is continuing and will eventually destabilise the inselberg. After more than 6,000 years of recorded human habitation in the area, the stone and public are separated by an iron fence, next to which is an explanatory sign.

== Cultural responses ==
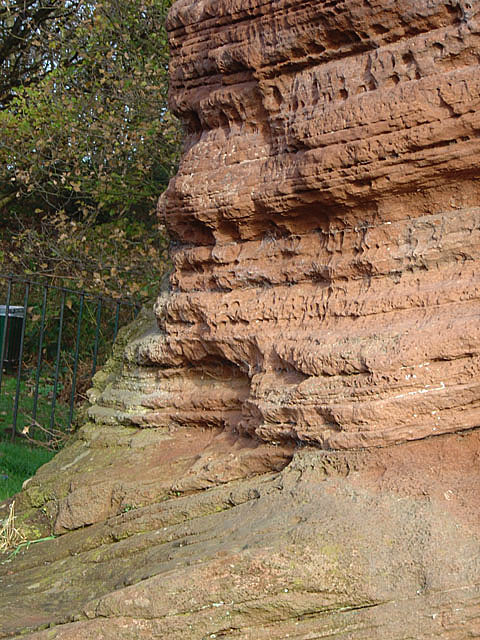
Eroded layers of Lenton Sandstone in the lower part of the Hemlock Stone

=== Medieval ===
In the Middle Ages it was claimed that the Devil threw the stone there from Castleton, Derbyshire, about 40 miles (64 km) away, because the ringing of church bells annoyed him. Quite apart from the fancifulness of the legend, there is no New Red Sandstone outcrop in that part of Derbyshire from which the stone could have come.

=== Modern ===
On 3 June 2002 to celebrate the Golden Jubilee of Elizabeth II a large bonfire was lit on the top of Hemlock Stone as part of the worldwide chain of 2,006 beacons lit, watched by a crowd of an estimated 2,000 spectators.

The stone is referenced in D.H. Lawrence's novel Sons and Lovers.

==== Hemlock Happening ====
From the Golden Jubilee celebration developed an annual free festival, the Hemlock Happening, that is held one day each June. It is organised by the communities of Stapleford and Bramcote and held in the Bramcote Walled Gardens near the stone. It usually lasts from 1 pm to 10:45 pm, showing the talents of local schools, groups and individuals and culminating in fireworks set off around the Stone at 10:30 pm. Some scheduled Hemlock Happenings are as follows:

- 10 June 2006 – attended by about 800 people
- 9 June 2007
- 7 June 2008
- 6 June 2009 – cancelled due to bad weather
- 12 June 2010
- 11 June 2011
- 2 June 2012 – Queen's Diamond Jubilee special
- 8 June 2013

Participating schools include George Spencer, St Johns Church of England and Bramcote Hills Primary School.
