= The Climbers (2019 film) =

- Theatrical release poster
- Chinese: 攀登者
- Hanyu Pinyin: Pāndēngzhě
- Directed by: Daniel Lee
- Written by: Alai; Daniel Lee
- Produced by: Tsui Hark; Susanna Tsang
- Starring: Wu Jing; Zhang Ziyi; Zhang Yi; Jing Boran; Hu Ge
- Cinematography: Tony Cheung; Chow Chi-fai; Sunny Tsang; Mike Lau
- Edited by: Li Lin; Jack Tang
- Music by: Henry Lai
- Production company: Shanghai Film Group
- Distributed by: Shanghai Film Co., Ltd.
- Release date: 30 September 2019
- Running time: 125 minutes
- Country: China
- Language: Mandarin
- Box office: $174 million

The Climbers (Chinese: 攀登者) is a 2019 Chinese adventure drama film directed by Daniel Lee and written by Alai. The film stars Wu Jing, Zhang Ziyi, Zhang Yi, Jing Boran, and Hu Ge. The film tells the real-life expedition of two generations of Chinese mountaineers to ascend Mount Everest from the perilous north side in 1960 and 1975. The film was released in China, the United Kingdom and North America on September 30, 2019.

== Plot ==
In 1960, the Chinese mountaineering team makes its first attempt to summit Mount Everest. Acting team leader Fang Wuzhou faces a critical decision—save his teammate Qu Songlin or preserve the camera in Qu Songlin's hand. Choosing to save his teammate, Fang leads the team to successfully reach the summit from the treacherous North Face, accomplishing what the global mountaineering community deemed impossible. However, due to the lack of a 360-degree photographic record of the peak, the feat was not recognized by mountaineers in the Soviet Union where most of the team trained.

Fang is infatuated with Xu Ying, a meteorology student. During the Cultural Revolution the climbing team is disbanded but regroups in the early 1970's.

In 1975, determined to gain global recognition, the Chinese mountaineering team regroups. With the support of meteorologist Xu Ying, Fang Wuzhou and Qu Songlin led a new generation of climbers, including Li Guoliang and Yang Guang, on another perilous ascent to the world's highest peak. Li, experienced in photography, promises to get good pictures for them.

Awaiting them are even harsher conditions—and a life-or-death challenge. No one except Fang is able to complete the training challenge in the time allotted, so he is given the position of team leader. This time, they have government and military support and a large base is set up for the climbers with Xu giving them constant weather updates.

Harsher than expected weather conditions cause some injuries and the local Tibetan monks advise them not to disrupt nature and call off the climb. With some improvisation led by Fang, they are advancing. But a wind storm knocks over their tents and ruptures Yang Guang's sleeping bag, causing him to lose his leg due to hypothermia. Li creates a plan to summit the mountain in a reduced timespan.

At Second Step, someone slips and an oxygen cylinder hits Yang Guang in the face, causing him to lose consciousness and drag the entire group down a cliff with Yang over the edge. Yang wakes up at the last possible second and hands his camera to the next guy in line, then sacrifices himself so the others won't fall off the cliff.

The group continues listening to Xu's weather reports as they continue climbing up the mountain. However, Xu begins coughing blood and dies just as they reach the summit. The group plants the Chinese flag on the summit.

In 2019, an old Yang Guang (with a prosthetic leg) climbs to Second Step and sees the ladder placed by his team, which has since helped over 1300 climbers.

== Cast ==
- Wu Jing as Fang Wuzhou (based on Wang Fuzhou)
- Zhang Ziyi as Xu Ying
- Zhang Yi as Qu Songlin
- Jing Boran as Li Guoliang
- Hu Ge as Yang Guang (based on Xia Boyu)
  - Jackie Chan as old Yang Guang
- Wang Jingchun as Zhao Chun
- Chen Long as Lin Jie
- He Lin as Zhao Hong
- Choenyi Tsering as Hei Mudan
- Liu Xiaofeng as Xu Haotian
- Tobgyal as a Tibetan Buddhist monk
- Lawang Lop as Jiebu (based on Gongbu)

== Production ==
Before the film was filmed, actor Wu Jing underwent a half-month cold tolerance training in Mount Gangshka, Menyuan Hui Autonomous County, Qinghai Province.

Production started in February 2019 and ended in late April 2019. Most of the film was shot on location in southwest China's Tibet Autonomous Region.

On February 16, 2019, actress Zhang Ziyi announced on Sina Weibo that Wu Jing, Zhang Yi, Jing Boran and He Lin had joined the cast. On March 1, Hu Ge and Jackie Chan joined the cast, and Zhang Ziyi would play a meteorologist.

== Release ==
The first poster was released on August 29, 2019, and the first official trailer was released on September 10, 2019. The film premiered at the 2019 Cannes Film Festival on May 17, 2019, and it was slated for release in China, the UK and North America on September 30, 2019.

== Reception ==
The Climbers grossed about 400 million yuan on its third day of screening. The film earned more than 761 million yuan on its opening weekend. The film's overall rating on Douban was a 6.5 out of 10 as of October 2019.
