= 2007 Altitude Everest expedition =

Expedition led by Conrad Anker

The 2007 Altitude Everest expedition, led by the American climber Conrad Anker, arrived at Base Camp below the north face of Everest in May 2007 and retraced the last journey of British climber George Mallory who was lost during the 1924 British Mount Everest expedition.

On 8 June 1924, Mallory, along with his climbing partner Andrew Irvine, set out for the summit of Everest but disappeared from view short of the summit. The mystery of whether they could have been the first climbers to reach the world's highest point has never been resolved. Anker and his colleagues investigated what happened to them, testing out the durability of their clothing and equipment to establish whether Mallory and Irvine could have reached the summit in the conditions they faced in 1924.

== The expedition team ==
Conrad Anker discovered George Mallory’s body lying on the mountain in 1999, 75 years after he had disappeared into the clouds near the summit. Accompanying Anker to retrace Mallory’s steps was British climber Leo Houlding. Anker and Houlding were joined by Kevin Thaw, Ken Sauls and Jimmy Chin, and a back-up team that included technical and medical support. Overseeing the expedition was Russell Brice.

Anker and Houlding successfully free-climbed the Second Step, having first removed the Chinese ladder (which was later replaced). Houlding rated the climb at 5.9, just within Mallory's estimated capabilities. However, Anker fell off the Step on his first attempt, raising the question: if a 5.12-grade climber has trouble with it, how well can a 5.9 climber be expected to do? Eight years earlier Anker had climbed the Second Step as part of the Mallory and Irvine Research Expedition but had used one point of aid by stepping on a rung of the ladder. At that time he had rated the climb at 5.10 and probably beyond Mallory; after the June 2007 climb he changed his view and said that "Mallory and Irvine could have climbed it". The climbing community still remains split on the subject of whether Mallory was capable of having climbed the Second Step.

== See also ==
- List of Mount Everest expeditions
- List of media related to Mount Everest
