= Ann Krcik =

American businesswoman (1957–2018)

- Born: 1957; New York City, NY
- Died: February 26, 2018 (aged 60–61)
- Occupations: Senior Director, Brand Communication & Outdoor Exploration The North Face
- Known for: Winning Camber Outdoors' Lifetime Achievement Award

Ann Krcik was a senior director of The North Face and a co-founder of Camber Outdoors (originally known as the Outdoor Industries Women's Coalition), the nonprofit created to push women's equality in the outdoor industry. She began working for The North Face at age 26, but left in 1992 to launch Extreme Connection, the first agency to represent athletes and secure endorsement deals and speaking engagements for them. She returned to the retailer in 2011, where she led global brand communications and outdoor exploration, with a strong focus on protecting public lands. She helped establish and lead The North Face's Explore Fund, which provides $500,000 annually to fund programs that increase outdoor access. Krcik was also elected to the Conservation Alliance board in 2015.

== Awards ==
On January 27, 2018, Krcik received the Lifetime Achievement Award from Camber Outdoors for the decades of mentorship she provided to men and women in the outdoor industry.

In 2005, she won the Pioneering Women Award from then-OIWC (now Camber Outdoors). In 2014, she won an Advocacy Award from Outdoor Industry Association and an American Himalayan Foundation AHF Star Award. In 2016, she was named a Yosemite Centennial Ambassador.

== Mentorship ==
During her time at The North Face, Krcik served for a period as The North Face's athlete manager and spearheaded the brand's program, which has continued to grow. She was known for having mentored and represented many outdoor industry athletes, including the late Todd Skinner, an American rock climber, and Conrad Anker. Skinner approached Krcik while she was at The North Face seeking sponsorship for himself and Paul Piana before their first free ascent of the Salathe Wall on Yosemite's El Capitan. Krcik founded Extreme Connection, the first agency to represent outdoor athletes to secure speaking engagements and endorsement deals, in 1992, with Skinner as her main client. He was only the second athlete to be put on retainer by The North Face, which has now sponsored dozens of athletes including Alex Honnold, Emily Harrington, Margo Hayes, Jimmy Chin, Ashima Shiraishi, and Conrad Anker.

Krcik also served as a mentor in the Outdoor Industry Association's Future Leadership Academy, a program to pair experienced outdoor industry professionals with successful mentors at well-known companies.
