= Liu Lianman =

Chinese mountain climber

- Born: 刘连满; December 1933; Ninghe, Hebei, China
- Died: 27 April 2016 (aged 82); Harbin, Heilongjiang, China
- Occupation: mountain climber
- Known for: "human ladder of the Mount Everest"

Liu Lianman (Chinese: 刘连满; pinyin: Liú Liánmǎn; December 1933 – 27 April 2016) was a Chinese mountain climber known as the "human ladder of Mount Everest".

== Biography ==
Liu was born in Ninghe County, Hebei (now part of Tianjin) in 1933. He was selected to the Chinese Mountaineering Team in 1955. While training in the Soviet Union, he reached the summit of Mount Elbrus and Muztagh Ata (marking its first documented ascent ever) in 1956. He became one of the first Chinese to reach the summit of Mount Gongga in June 1957.

In May 1960, Liu and his teammates Wang Fuzhou, Qu Yinhua and Gongbu tried to ascend to the summit of Mount Everest via the north ridge. Liu volunteered to be a human ladder when the team reached the Second Step, which helped his teammates become the first to climb Mount Everest via the north face. Although failing to reach the summit, he was soon thereafter described as the "human ladder of Mount Everest" and was awarded a National Sports Medal of Honor. His heroic story Climb to the Top of the Earth (登上地球之巅) was included in the Chinese textbook of junior high school. He retired from mountain climbing in 1973 and worked at Harbin Electrical Machine Factory.

Liu died on 27 April 2016 at the age of 82 in Harbin.

== Achievements ==
- 1956 — Mount Elbrus (first ascent of Chinese)
- 1956 — Muztagh Ata (first ascent in the world)
- 1957 — Mount Gongga (first ascent of Chinese)
- 1960 — Mount Everest (turned back at the Second Step)

== See also ==
- 1960 Chinese Mount Everest expedition
