= Meru (film) =

2015 climbing film

- Theatrical release poster
- Directed by: Jimmy Chin; Elizabeth Chai Vasarhelyi
- Screenplay by: Jimmy Chin; Elizabeth Chai Vasarhelyi
- Produced by: Jimmy Chin; Shannon Ethridge; Elizabeth Chai Vasarhelyi
- Cinematography: Jimmy Chin; Renan Ozturk
- Edited by: Bob Eisenhardt
- Music by: J. Ralph
- Production companies: Little Monster Films; Itinerant Media
- Distributed by: Music Box Films
- Release dates: January 23, 2015 (Sundance Film Festival); August 14, 2015 (United States)
- Running time: 87 minutes
- Language: English
- Box office: $2.3 million

Meru is a 2015 documentary film chronicling the 2011 first ascent of a new climbing route up the prow of the dramatic Shark's Fin on the northeast side of Meru Peak in the Indian Himalayas. The route required a complex range of alpine climbing, big wall climbing, and aid climbing techniques, and had rebuffed many famous climbers, including the team of Conrad Anker, Jimmy Chin, and Renan Ozturk who are featured in the film. It was co-directed by the husband and wife team of Jimmy Chin and Elizabeth Chai Vasarhelyi, and won the 'U.S. Audience Documentary Award' at the 2015 Sundance Film Festival.

== Premise ==
After attempting but failing to summit Meru in 2008, Anker, Chin, and Ozturk return to the mountain to conquer its peak – a 4,000 foot wall known as the "Shark's Fin". As they climb, the men also document their ascent. "You know, I'm always a climber first," said Chin on balancing climbing with filmmaking. "I'm always thinking about the safety of myself and the team. And I make that evaluation before I take the camera out." The film is a mixture of footage that chronicles both attempts (the failed 2008 and the successful 2011) while crafting a narrative about the climbers' attempts to face their demons. After suffering a horrific accident while filming on location with Chin, Ozturk has a mere five months to recover before their second attempt, battling near-fatal injuries. Four days after Ozturk's accident, Chin returns to the filming location to finish but is caught in a catastrophic avalanche that he miraculously survives with barely a scratch. Anker wrestles with bringing his mentor's (Terry "Mugs" Stump) dream to fruition and the loss of both him and his climbing partner (Alex Lowe) many years ago. During the successful 2011 summit, Chin and Ozturk shared a Canon 5D Mark II and a Panasonic TM900 camcorder to capture footage that would be used in the film.

== Reception ==
On review aggregation website Rotten Tomatoes, Meru has an approval rating of 88% based on 78 reviews, with a rating average score of 7.3 out of 10. The site's consensus reads, "Gripping visually as well as narratively, Meru is the rare documentary that proves thought-provoking while offering thrilling wide-screen vistas." On Metacritic the film has a score of 77 out of 100 based on reviews from 15 critics, indicating "generally favorable reviews".

The film made $91,279 from 7 theaters in its opening weekend. It expanded to 35 theaters in its second weekend, making $562,786. During its fifth weekend, it earned $416,701 from 176 theaters, bringing the total box office gross to $2,334,228.

On December 1, the film was selected as one of 15 shortlisted for the Academy Award for Best Documentary Feature.

== Awards ==
- Golden Piton Award by Climbing Magazine for 'Best Big Wall Climb' of the Year
- Number 1 ascent of the year by Rock & Ice
- U.S. Audience Documentary Award at the 2015 Sundance Film Festival

== See also ==
- List of films shot over three or more years
