= Roger Baxter-Jones =

British mountaineer

- Born: 1950; London, England
- Died: 1985 (aged 34–35); Aiguille de Triolet

Roger Baxter-Jones (1950 - 1985), was a British mountaineer, skier and alpine guide. He was an early pioneer in Himalayan alpine style ascents of eight-thousander mountains, and a guide in Chamonix, noted for his competence and vast experience. Paul Nunn wrote "One of Britain's leading mountaineers, a member of the ACG Committee for years, and certainly one of the strongest ever, he was a top off-piste skier, and a mountaineer of impeccable judgment, able to guide on routes of the highest standards with a considerable margin."

== Notable ascents ==
His notable ascents in the French Alps include the second ascent of the Whymper Spur Direct on the Grandes Jorasses with Nick Colton; and the first winter ascent (solo) of the North Face of the Aiguille des Grands Charmoz.. He made a fast ascent of the North Face of the Matterhorn (Schmidt Route) in August, 1978 with Richard Parker.

His notable Himalayan ascents include Jannu, Makalu II, Makalu (unsuccessful), Shisha Pangma, Broad Peak, K2 (unsuccessful). Baxter-Jones' golden rule "Come back alive, come back as friends, get to the top — in that order" was well respected amongst elite climbers.

Baxter-Jones climbed with many of the premiere alpinists of his time including Doug Scott (who said of Baxter-Jones: "All the partners I've had who I really rated have gone"), Georges Bettembourg and Alex MacIntyre.

Baxter-Jones and Scott's ascent of Broad Peak was the subject of the 1984 film Himalaya - 8000 mètres sans oxygène by Jean Afanassieff.

== Death ==
He died on 8 July 1985 aged 35 while guiding a client, when a serac collapsed on the north face of the Triolet.

The Doug Parker and Roger Baxter-Jones Memorial Scholarship was established at the American Mountain Guides Association to honor his memory.

== Personal life ==
Roger Baxter-Jones married Christine Comte, and had a daughter, the actress Melanie Baxter-Jones.
