= The Wildest Dream =

- Directed by: Anthony Geffen
- Written by: Mark Halliley
- Produced by: Anthony Geffen; Mike Medavoy; Claudia Perkins
- Starring: Conrad Anker; Leo Houlding; Ralph Fiennes; Natasha Richardson; Hugh Dancy; Alan Rickman
- Narrated by: Liam Neeson
- Cinematography: Chris Openshaw; Ken Sauls
- Edited by: Peter Miller
- Music by: Joel Douek
- Production companies: Altitude Films; Atlantic Productions
- Distributed by: Serengeti Entertainment; National Geographic Entertainment
- Release dates: January 9, 2010 (Palm Springs International Film Festival); August 6, 2010
- Running time: 94 minutes
- Country: United States
- Language: English
- Box office: $873,594 (US)

The Wildest Dream is a 2010 theatrical-release feature documentary film about the British climber George Mallory who disappeared on Mount Everest in 1924 with his climbing partner Andrew Irvine. The film interweaves two stories, one about climber Conrad Anker (who discovered Mallory's body lying on Everest in 1999) returning to Everest to investigate Mallory's disappearance and the other a biography of Mallory told through letters (read by Ralph Fiennes and Natasha Richardson, in her final film), original film footage from the 1920s and archival photos. The film was released in the US and on giant screen cinemas around the world by National Geographic Entertainment in August 2010 as The Wildest Dream: Conquest of Everest. The film was released in the UK by Serengeti Entertainment in September 2010 as The Wildest Dream.

== Synopsis ==
In 1924 mountaineer George Mallory was torn between love for his wife Ruth, and his obsession with the last great adventure left to man: becoming the first person to reach the summit of the untouched Mount Everest.

Dressed in gabardine and wearing hobnailed boots, Mallory risked everything in pursuit of his dream, but was last seen alive 800 feet below the summit. Then the clouds rolled in and he disappeared.

After discovering Mallory’s body on Everest in 1999, modern climber Conrad Anker’s life became intertwined with Mallory’s story. Mallory’s frozen body was found with his belongings intact; the only thing missing was a photograph of Ruth, which Mallory had promised to place on the summit. Haunted by Mallory's story, Anker returns to Everest with British climbing prodigy Leo Houlding to discover the truth about Mallory and to unravel the mysteries surrounding his disappearance.

Anker and his climbing partner take on the Second Step without the use of the fixed ladder; free climbing it with the use of some modern safety precautions (e.g. perlon rope, camming devices, belay devices), to evaluate if indeed Mallory was capable of climbing the Second Step himself in 1924.

== Cast ==
- Conrad Anker
- Hugh Dancy as Andrew Irvine
- Ralph Fiennes as George Mallory
- Leo Houlding
- Liam Neeson as Narrator
- Natasha Richardson as Ruth Mallory
- Alan Rickman as Noel Odell

== Critical reception ==
The film won the award for Best Adventure Film at the Boulder International Film Festival. On Rotten Tomatoes, it holds a 77% approval rating, based on 35 reviews with an average score of 6.87/10.

The film received numerous positive reviews from critics when it was released in the US. Andrew Barker in Variety described the film as "gorgeous looking", writing that "the film contains a number of awe-inspiring shots and a wonderful, computer-generated guided illustration of the entire path the explorers took up the mountain". Kenneth Turan wrote in the Los Angeles Times that the film "adroitly mixes a variety of material" while "narrator Liam Neeson and reading voices Natasha Richardson, Hugh Dancy and Alan Rickman do exceptionally strong work". Pam Grady of Boxoffice raved about the film and wrote "It is a moving tale and a breathtaking sight."

The film also got a strong critical reaction in the UK. Anna Smith in Empire commented that "the tale of Mallory’s fatal ascent is well told, the mountain photography is spectacular and rare archive film recalls a time when the world still had peaks to conquer". Carmen Gray described it as "captivating and seductive" in Sight & Sound although she felt that "the equivalence of the journeys often seems forced".

== See also ==
- List of media related to Mount Everest
