= Conrad Anker =

American rock climber, mountaineer, and author (born 1962)

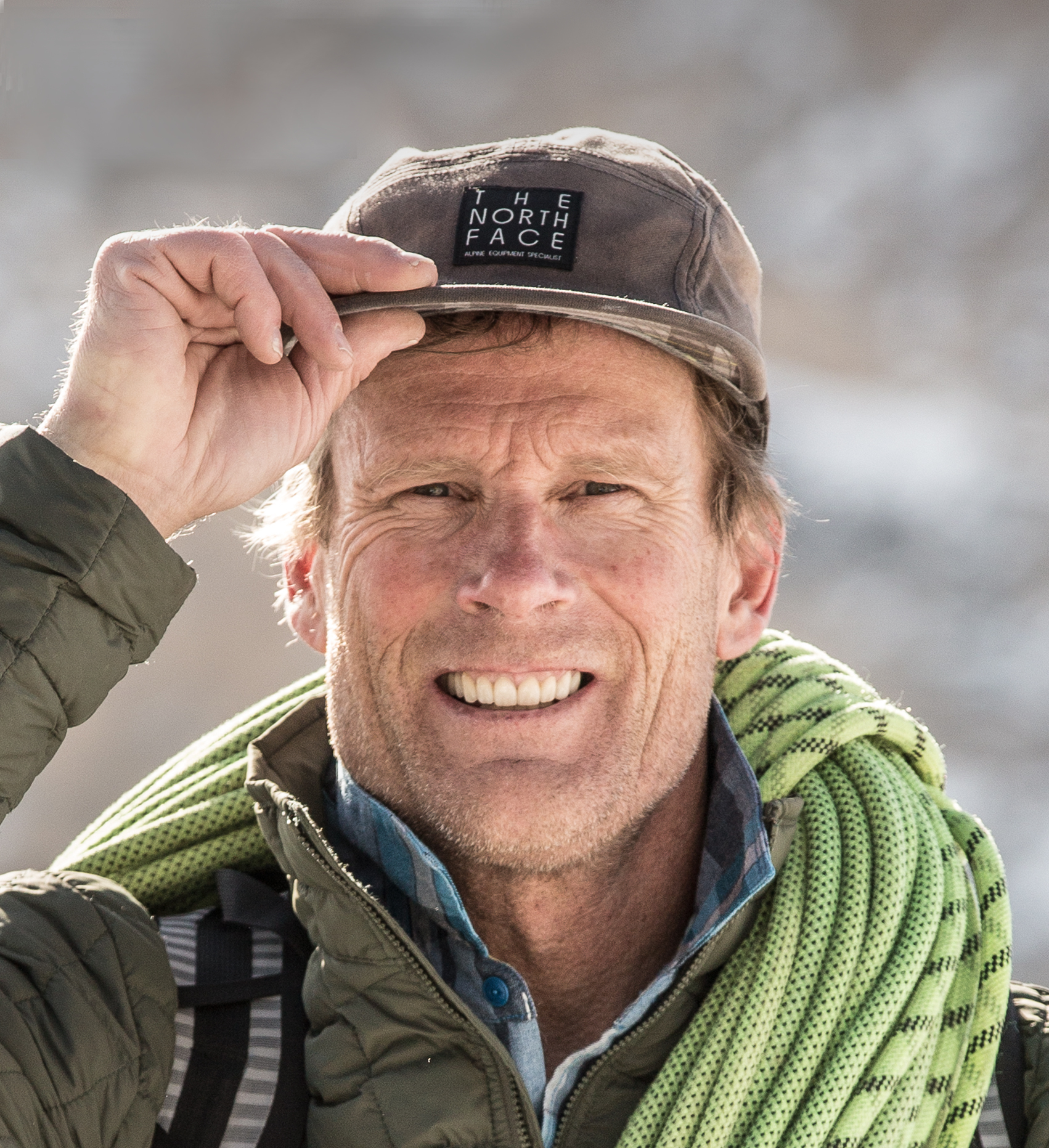
- Conrad Anker photo from Yellowstone National Park flier
- Born: November 27, 1962 (age 63); California, United States
- Education: University of Utah, Northumbria University
- Occupations: Rock climber, mountaineer, author
- Spouses: Jennifer Lowe (m. 2001; div. 2024)
- Conrad Anker's voice from the BBC programme Desert Island Discs, June 9, 2013

Conrad Anker (born November 27, 1962) is an American rock climber, mountaineer, and author. He was the team leader of The North Face climbing team for 26 years until 2018. In 1999, he located George Mallory's body on Everest as a member of a search team looking for the remains of the British climber who was last seen in 1924.

== Career ==
After discovering George Mallory’s body on Everest in 1999, Anker returned to Everest with British climbing prodigy Leo Houlding in the 2007 Altitude Everest expedition to discover the truth about Mallory and to unravel the mysteries surrounding his disappearance. Anker and his climbing partner retraced Mallory and Irvine's footsteps and took on the Second Step without the use of the fixed ladder; free climbing it with the use of some modern safety precautions (e.g. perlon rope, camming devices, belay devices), to evaluate if Mallory would have been capable of climbing the Second Step himself in 1924.

Anker was the team leader of The North Face climbing team for 26 years until 2018.

== Personal life ==
Anker had a heart attack in 2016 during an attempted ascent of Lunag Ri with David Lama. He was flown via helicopter to Kathmandu where he underwent emergency coronary angioplasty with a stent placed in his proximal left anterior descending artery. Afterwards he retired from high altitude mountaineering, but otherwise he continues his work.

Anker married Jennifer Lowe-Anker in 2001, becoming the stepfather of her three sons—Max, Sam, and Isaac Lowe—from her marriage to the late climber Alex Lowe, who had died on expedition with Anker in 1999. The family’s journey was chronicled in Max Lowe’s National Geographic documentary Torn (2021 film). They divorced in 2024.

He lives in Bozeman, Montana.

== Ascents and expeditions ==
- 1987 Southeast Face Gurney Peak, Kichatna Mountains, Alaska Range, Alaska, United States. First Ascent (FA) with Seth 'S.T.' Shaw, Robert Ingle and James Garrett; summit attained May 8, 1987.
- 1989 Northwest Face Mount Hunter, Alaska Range, Alaska, USA. FA with Seth 'S.T.' Shaw, summit attained July 3, 1989.
- 1990 Rodeo Queen, Streaked Wall, Zion National Park, Utah, USA. FA with Mugs Stump.
- 1992 East Buttress, Middle Triple Peak, Kichatna Spires, Alaska, USA, 2nd ascent with Seth Shaw.
- 1992 Shunes Buttress, Red Arch Mountain, Zion National Park. FFA with Dave Jones.
- 1994 Badlands (YDS VI 5.10 A3 WI4+, 1000m), Southeast Face, Torre Egger, Patagonia. Conrad Anker, Jay Smith and Steve Gerberding (USA), FA December 12, 1994.
- 1997 The Northwest Face (V 5.8, 2100m), Peak Loretan, Ellsworth Mountains, Antarctica (solo) Jan 15–16, 1997.
- 1997 Rakekniven Peak, Queen Maud Land, Antarctica, FA with Alex Lowe and Jon Krakauer. Featured in the cover article of the February 1998 National Geographic Magazine.
- 1997 Tsering Mosong, Latok II, Karakorum, Pakistan, FA with Alexander Huber, Thomas Huber and Toni Gutsch.
- 1997 Continental Drift, El Capitan, Yosemite, CA, USA. FA with Steve Gerberding and Kevin Thaw.
- 1999 Mallory and Irvine Research Expedition, Mount Everest, Nepal / Tibet.
- 1999 Shishapangma American Ski Expedition, Tibet. Survived a massive avalanche which killed climbing partner Alex Lowe and cameraman David Bridges.
- 2001 East Face of Vinson Massif, Ellsworth Mountains, Antarctica. FA with Jon Krakauer. Featured on PBS series NOVA in February 2003.
- 2002 National Geographic expedition to make an unsupported crossing of the remote Changtang Plateau in Tibet with Galen Rowell, Rick Ridgeway and Jimmy Chin. The expedition was featured in National Geographic's April 2003 issue and documented in Rick Ridgeway's book The Big Open.
- 2005 Southwest Ridge, Cholatse, Khumbu region, Nepal – summit attained with Kevin Thaw, John Griber, Kris Erickson and Abby Watkins on May 12, 2005.
- 2007 Leads Altitude Everest Expedition 2007, joined by Leo Houlding, Jimmy Chin and Kevin Thaw, retracing Mallory's last steps on Everest. 2nd summit. First documented free climb of the Second Step.
- 2011 Shark's Fin, Meru Peak, FA with Jimmy Chin and Renan Ozturk.
- 2012 Leads "Everest Education Expedition" with National Geographic, The North Face, Montana State University and Mayo Clinic – 3rd summit, this time without oxygen, with Cory Richards, Sam Elias, Kris Erickson, Emily Harrington, Philip Henderson, Mark Jenkins, David Lageson, Hilaree O'Neill. Mayo Team – Dr. Bruce Johnson, Landon Bassett, Derek Campbell, Amine Issa.

Anker has also climbed notable routes in Yosemite Valley (California), Zion National Park (Utah), Baffin Island (Canada), and the Ellsworth Mountains in Antarctica.

== Writings ==
- Anker, Conrad (1988). "Gumbies on Gurney". American Alpine Journal. 30 (62). NYC, NY, USA: American Alpine Club: 69–75. ISBN 0-930410-33-5.
- Anker, Conrad (1990). "Hunter's Northwest Face". American Alpine Journal. 42 (64). American Alpine Club: 36–38. ISBN 0-930410-43-2.
- Anker, Conrad (1998). "With You in Spirit". American Alpine Journal. 40 (72). American Alpine Club: 140–145. ISBN 0-930410-78-5.
- Anker, Conrad; David Roberts (2001) [1999]. The Lost Explorer: Finding Mallory on Mt. Everest. New York, NY, USA: Simon and Schuster / Touchstone. ISBN 0-684-87151-3.

== Films ==
- Shackleton's Antarctic Adventure (2001)
- Light of the Himalaya (2006). At the heart of the planet's most formidable mountain range live people who suffer from the highest rates of cataract blindness on the planet. The North Face athletes join eye surgeons from Nepal and America in hopes of making a difference. The film follows the doctors' work on the Himalayan Cataract Project all the way to the summit of a 21,000-foot Himalayan giant.
- The Endless Knot (2007). Directed by Michael Brown and produced by David D'Angelo, an HDTV documentary film with Rush HD and The North Face. In October 1999, Alex Lowe and Conrad Anker were buried by an avalanche in the Tibetan Himalaya. Anker barely survived the avalanche, but was overcome with Survivor's Guilt. In the months following the tragedy, he worked to comfort Lowe's widow, and eventually they unexpectedly found love.
- The Wildest Dream (2010), IMAX, directed by Anthony Geffen, Altitude Films, US distribution, National Geographic Entertainment releasing.
- Meru, a 2015 documentary film about climbing the Shark's fin route of Meru Central
- National Parks Adventure (2016), a short IMAX film/documentary by MacGillivray Freeman about the National Park Service.
- Lunag Ri (2016), a documentary film by Joachim Hellinger about the attempted ascent of the Lunag Ri by Conrad Anker and David Lama
- Black Ice (2020), which premiered at the fifteenth Reel Rock festival, features a crew of aspiring ice climbers who travel from the Memphis Rox gym to the frozen wilds of Montana, where mentors Manoah Ainuu, Conrad Anker and Fred Campbell share their love of winter adventure in the mountains.
- Torn (2021), a documentary film by Max Lowe about the death of his father, Alex Lowe, and subsequent relationship and marriage between his mother, Jennifer Lowe-Anker, and Anker.

== Awards ==
- 2008 – Simon Scott-Harden Award for Environmental Design Excellence – Batch 44
- 2010 – David A Brower Award – American Alpine Club
- 2015 – George Mallory Award – Wasatch Mountain Film Festival
- 2016 – Golden Piton Award – Lifetime Achievement – Climbing magazine
- 2017 – Honorary Doctorate at the University of Utah
- 2018 – Jack Roberts Lifetime Achievements Award – Cody, WY Ice Festival

== See also ==
- List of Mount Everest summiters by number of times to the summit
- Timex Expedition WS4
