= Boyan Petrov =

Bulgarian zoologist and mountaineer

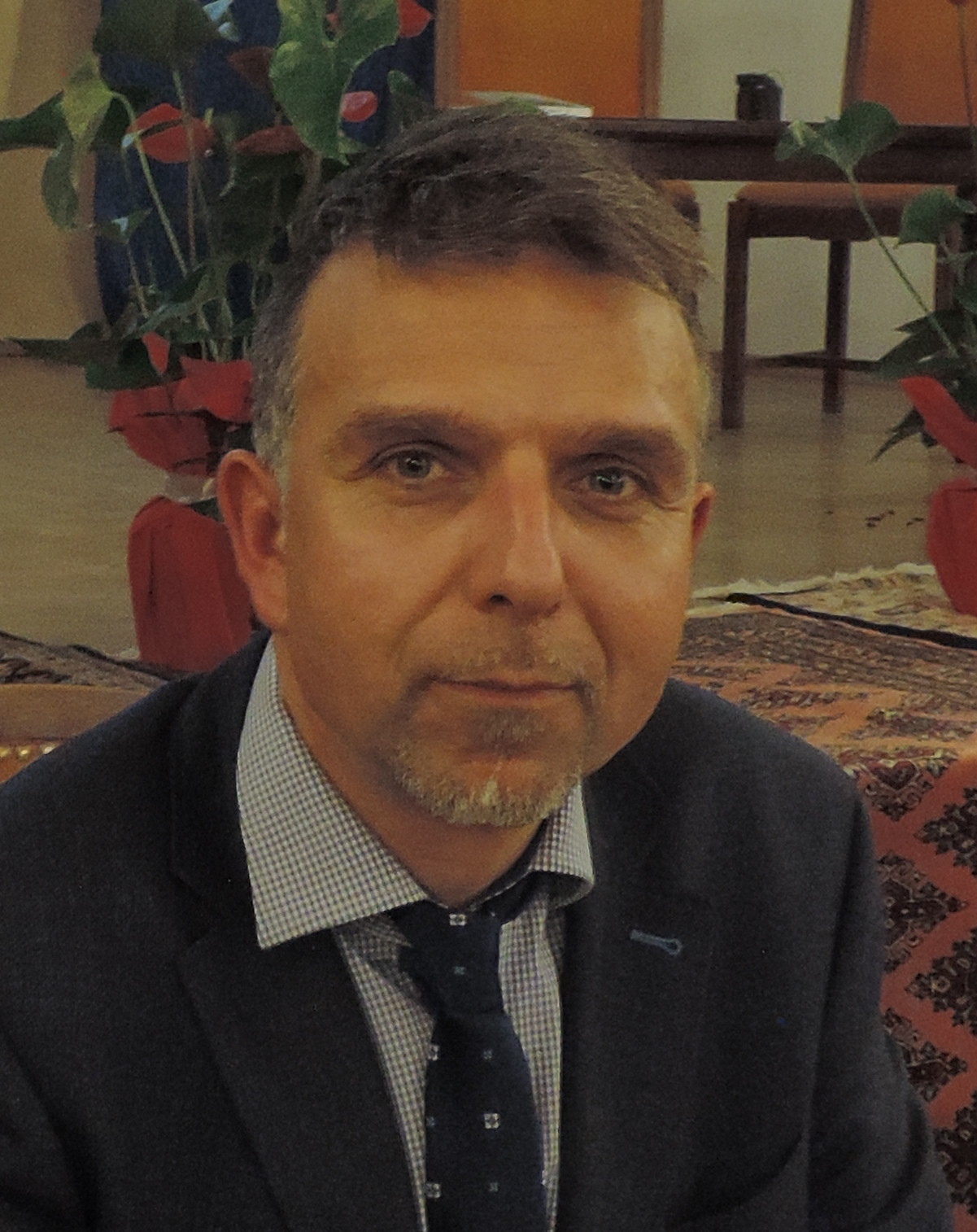
- During the presentation of his book "The First Seven", February 6, 2017.
- Born: 7 February 1973; Sofia, Bulgaria
- Disappeared: 5 May 2018 (aged 45); Shishapangma, Tibet, China
- Status: Missing for 8 years, 3 months and 2 days
- Occupations: Mountaineer, zoologist
- Known for: Climbing 10 out of the 14 eight-thousanders without supplementary oxygen
- Spouse: Radoslava Nenova
- Children: 2, Teya Petrova, Yavor Petrov

Boyan Petrov (Bulgarian: Боян Петров, born 7 February 1973 – disappeared 5 May 2018) was a Bulgarian zoologist and mountaineer, who worked at the National Museum of Natural History in Sofia.

At the time of his disappearance he had climbed 10 of the 14 eight-thousanders, all without supplemental oxygen and no help from Sherpas. He was the first Bulgarian to climb four of those mountains: Gasherbrum I (2009), Kangchenjunga (2014), K2 (2014) and Manaslu (2015). He climbed them despite insulin-dependent diabetes, proving that physical activity does not interfere, but helps to control diabetes. As of 2024, Boyan Petrov and Atanas Skatov are the Bulgarian climbers with the highest number of successful ascents of 8000 meter peaks but Skatov was climbing with commercial expeditions and almost always with supplemental oxygen.

== Achievements ==
On 20 May 2014 he became the first Bulgarian to climb the third highest peak on Earth Kangchenjunga (8586m), as well as the first diabetic to ascend to such an altitude and without oxygen. On 23 July he climbed Broad Peak (8047m). On 31 July 2014 he became the first Bulgarian to climb the second highest peak on the planet K2 (8611m), which also made him the 35th person to climb three eight-thousanders in less than 100 days. His double climb – on Broad Peak and K2 – in 8 days, was also a world record. For these remarkable successes the Bulgarian climber was greeted with a video message by mountaineering legend Reinhold Messner. His documentary film about his climbs "3x8000" was broadcast on Bulgarian National Television in December 2014. He reached the summit of Mt. Dhaulagiri (8167m) on 29 September 2017 at 01:00 pm without the help of supplementary oxygen.

Boyan Petrov was a cancer survivor and a diabetic. In 2008 he fell while climbing in the Alps and broke his leg. During the descent of Gasherbrum II in 2009 he fell in a glacial crevasse and was saved by a group of Spanish climbers. In 2013 Petrov suffered another leg fracture due to a car accident. Despite his injuries, in the following year he achieved a hat-trick by successfully climbing Kangchenjunga, Broad Peak, and K2 with internal fixators in this leg. After the descent of K2, he suffered a serious hypoglycemic crisis while in base camp, lost consciousness and was able to recover with the help of Polish climbers.

== Disappearance ==
Petrov was declared missing while climbing Shishapangma. On 5 May 2018 his tent and sleeping bag were found in the area of Camp-3 of the mountain, which is around 7,300 metres altitude. Due to Bulgarian diplomatic efforts, for the first time in 20 years, a Nepalese rescue helicopter was allowed to fly above China. No other signs of him were found either around Camp-3 or on the Shishapangma. The search for him was discontinued on 16 May. According to other climbers, he may have fallen into a crevasse on the way to the top.

== Ascents of peaks over 6000 meters ==
Year	Peak	Height	Mountain	State	Notes
2001	Broad Peak	8047 m	Karakoram	Pakistan	Altitude reached 7300 m
2003	Lenin Peak	7134 m	Pamir	Kyrgyzstan	
2004	Aconcagua	6962 m	Andes	Argentina	
2004	Denali	6195 m	American Cordillera	USA	
2005	K2	8611 m	Karakoram	Pakistan	Altitude reached 8200 m
2007	Khan Tengri	6995 m	Tian Shan	Kazakhstan	
2009	Gasherbrum I	8080 m	Karakoram	Pakistan	First Bulgarian ascent. Without oxygen
2009	Gasherbrum II	8035 m	Karakoram	Pakistan	Altitude reached 8030 m
2010	Peak Korzhenevskaya	7105 m	Pamir	Tajikistan	
2010	Ismoil Somoni Peak	7495 m	Pamir	Tajikistan	
2014	Kangchenjunga	8586 m	Himalayas	Nepal	First Bulgarian ascent. Without oxygen
2014	Broad Peak	8047 m	Karakoram	Pakistan	Without oxygen
2014	K2	8611 m	Karakoram	Pakistan	First Bulgarian ascent. Without oxygen
2015	Manaslu	8163 m	Himalayas	Nepal	First Bulgarian ascent. Without oxygen
2016	Annapurna I	8091 m	Himalayas	Nepal	Without oxygen
2016	Makalu	8485 m	Himalayas	Nepal	Without oxygen
2016	Nanga Parbat	8126 m	Himalayas	Pakistan	Without oxygen
2017	Gasherbrum II	8035 m	Karakoram	Pakistan	Without oxygen
2017	Dhaulagiri	8167 m	Himalayas	Nepal	Without oxygen
2018	Shishapangma	8027 m	Himalayas	China	Reached Camp 3 at 7,500 m before disappearing

Eight-thousanders climbed.

== See also ==
- Hristo Prodanov
- List of deaths on eight-thousanders
- List of people who disappeared mysteriously: post-1970
