= Leo Houlding =

British rock climber and mountaineer

- Born: 28 July 1980
- Occupations: rock climber and mountaineer
- Children: 2

Leo Houlding (born 28 July 1980) is a British rock climber and mountaineer.

== Early life ==
Houlding began rock climbing at the age of 10. In 1996, he became the British Junior Indoor Climbing Champion. He spent the summer of 1997, aged 17, living in and around Llanberis in North Wales.

== Climbing career ==
In 2005, Houlding appeared in the BBC television program Top Gear in which he raced presenter Jeremy Clarkson up a cliff face in Verdon Gorge, winning the challenge (Series 7, Episode 2). Houlding, joined by Tim Emmett, climbed the canyon whilst Clarkson drove an Audi RS4 to the top using the surrounding roads. He has also appeared several times on the Audi Channel.

He was the subject of the 2003 TV documentary "My Right Foot" which was part of the Extreme Lives series aired on BBC Television.

In 2007, he joined the 2007 Altitude Everest Expedition, led by American climber and mountaineer, Conrad Anker, retracing the last steps of legendary British climbers George Mallory and Andrew "Sandy" Irvine on Mount Everest. They take on the Second Step without the use of the fixed ladder; free climbing it with the use of some modern safety precautions (e.g. perlon rope, camming devices, belay devices), to evaluate if indeed Mallory and Irvine were capable of climbing the Second Step themselves in 1924.

In 2008, Houlding presented Take Me to the Edge, a British reality series on Virgin1 (later repeated on STV); and signed a deal with Ford Motor Company to become a brand ambassador for their pick up truck, the Ford Ranger.

In August 2009, he led a team of climbers and filmmakers to Mount Asgard on Baffin Island, Canada. They attempted to free climb a 15-pitch route up the north face of the mountain to create the first free route. Although over half of the ascent was eventually freed, the team was unable to complete the full free ascent within the available time. Houlding and American team member Sean 'Stanley' Leary BASE jumped from the summit. The ascent took 12 days and is featured in the 2010 film The Asgard Project.

He appeared in the 2010 film, The Wildest Dream, along with Conrad Anker retracing the steps of George Mallory and Andrew Irvine in order to recreate their journey up Mount Everest.

In 2010, he completed his 10-year project The Prophet, becoming the first Briton to free a new route on El Capitan in Yosemite.

From December 2012 to January 2013, a team led by Houlding and including Alastair Lee, Chris Rabone, Sean Leary, Jason Pickles, and David Reeves made the first ascent of a new route up the northeast ridge of Ulvetanna Peak in Antarctica. The peak was described as 'the most demanding peak on the world's toughest continent' via its fearsome northeast ridge. The film that was produced, The Last Great Climb premiered in London on 5 November 2013.

After his Mount Asgard climbing partner Sean Leary's wingsuit death in 2014, Houlding stopped BASE jumping. Houlding returned to summit Mount Asgard in 2023, establishing a new 12-pitch line called Loki's Mischief on the mountain's 1200m East Face.

== Personal life ==
In 2020, Houlding's entire family reached the summit of the Piz Badile, including his seven-year-old daughter who climbed it unaided (the youngest ever to reach the summit), and his 3-year-old son (carried on his mother's back).
