= He Lin (actress) =

Chinese actress

- Born: November 14, 1977 (age 47); Shanghai, China
- Occupation: Actress
- Years active: 1999–present
- Awards: International Emmy Award

He Lin (Chinese: 何琳; pinyin: Hé Lín; born 14 November 1977) is a Chinese actress. In November 2005, she won the International Emmy Award for Best Actress for her starring role in the film Mother (or Slave Mother, adapted from a novel by Chinese writer Rou Shi), and was the first Asian actress to be honored with an Emmy Award.

== Filmography ==
=== Film ===
Year	English title	Original title	Role	Notes
1990	The Gunman Against Opium	禁烟枪手	Xiaolan	
1993	First Attraction	第一诱惑	Qingqing	
1994	Office	奧菲斯小姐	Young girl	
1996	Beijia's Cherry Class	贝加的樱桃班	Teacher Bai	TV film
2003	A Surprise Victory	出奇制胜		TV film
2003	Late Loving You	来不及爱你	Liu Jianshe's wife	Cameo
2003	Slave Mother	為奴隸的母親	Axiu	TV film
2009	The Founding of a Republic	建國大業		
2010	Amei	阿妹	Amei	
2011	The Queen	女王	Xia Yunong	TV film
2011	Three Miracle Heroes: Miracles of Cards	奇迹三雄之撲克遊戲	Fan Juan	
2014	Love at First Sight	第一眼爱情	Jiang Xiaoyu	
2019	The Climbers	攀登者	Zhao Hong	

=== TV series ===
- 1999 - Qian Shou ... Xia Xiaobing
- 2000 - Palace of Desire ... Lady of Wei State
- 2002 - Qian Wang ... Li Xiangling
- 2006 - Ma La Po Xi ... Wu Rui
- 2011 - Cai li fu ... Choyleefut Team Assistant
- 2014 - Deng Xiaoping at History's Crossroads ...Deng Rong

== Awards ==
Year	Award	Category	Nomination	Result
1999	China TV Golden Eagle Award	Best Actress in a Supporting Role	Qian Shou	Nominated
2005	33rd International Emmy Awards	Best Performance by an Actress	Slave Mother	Won
2007	Flying Apsaras Awards	Outstanding Actress	Ma La Po Xi	Nominated
