= Take Me to the Edge =

- Starring: Leo Houlding
- Country of origin: United Kingdom
- No. of seasons: 1
- No. of episodes: 6

Production
- Running time: 60 minutes (including adverts)
- Production company: Ginger Productions

Original release
- Network: Virgin1; STV (repeats)
- Release: 31 August – 5 October 2008

Take Me to the Edge is a British reality series investigating global rites of passage. Host Leo Houlding brings five adults to different parts of the world, where they experience local rites of passage such as rock climbs, running through fire, drinking blood straight from a cow's neck and climbing into a swarm of bees.

The six-part series was commissioned by and first shown on Virgin1 (now known as "Channel One"), and has been re-aired in 2009 on Scottish television station, STV.

== Episodes ==
1. Vanuatu
2. New Zealand
3. Bhutan
4. Kenya
5. India
6. Oman
