= Elizabeth Chai Vasarhelyi =

American film director

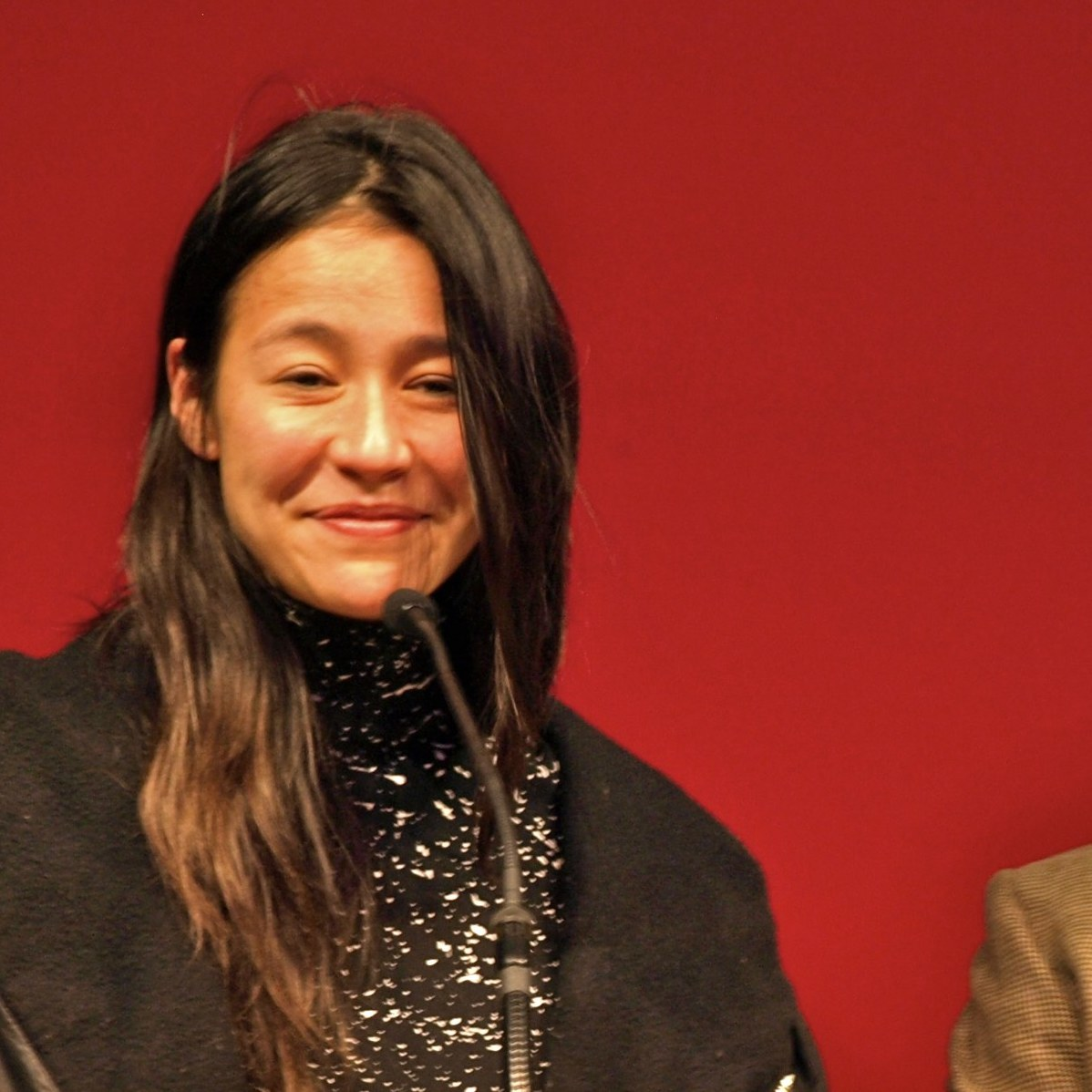
- Elizabeth Chai Vasarhelyi at Sundance 2015
- Born: 1977 or 1978 (age 47–48)
- Other names: Chai Vasarhelyi; E. Chai Vasarhelyi
- Occupations: Director, producer
- Years active: 2003–present
- Spouse: Jimmy Chin (m. 2013; div. 2025)
- Children: 2
- Website: Official website

Elizabeth Chai Vasarhelyi (/ˌvɑːsəˈrɛli/ VAH-sə-REL-ee; born 1977 or 1978) is an American documentary filmmaker. She was the director, along with her then-husband, Jimmy Chin, for the film Free Solo, which won the 2019 Academy Award for Best Documentary Feature. The film profiled Alex Honnold and his free solo climb of El Capitan in June 2017. Vasarhelyi and Chin's first scripted film venture was Nyad, a biopic chronicling Diana Nyad's quest to be the first person to swim from Cuba to Florida.

== Early life and education ==
Vasarhelyi grew up in New York City, and is the daughter of Marina Vasarhelyi, a college administrator, and Miklós Vásárhelyi, a college professor. Her father is a Hungarian-born Brazilian and her mother is from Hong Kong. Vasarhelyi is a graduate of The Brearley School. She holds a B.A. in Comparative Literature from Princeton University.

== Career ==
=== Early career ===
Vasarhelyi's first film, A Normal Life, won Best Documentary at the Tribeca Film Festival in 2003. She began working on it during her junior year in college, wanting to do something to help after the ethnic cleansing and war crimes of the Kosovo War. After her junior year, she and Hugo Berkeley, who had just graduated from Princeton, went to Kosovo to make a documentary. They arrived 10 days after the war ended, heading to Pristina, where they met groups of passionate young journalists and activists and decided to center the documentary there. This became a 25-minute work, Reconstructing Kosovo, that Vasarhelyi used in her thesis on comparative literature, but she and Berkeley then expanded it into an hour-long documentary for public release.

The final documentary centers on seven youth: journalists Nebi Qena and Garentina Kraja; soloist from the Jericho group, Petrit Çarkaxhiu; director, Kaltrina Krasniqi; Ylber Bajraktari, Driton Bekqeli and Linda Gusia; as well as publisher of the newspaper Koha Ditore, Veton Surroi. The documentary also brings in its two creators as characters, watching them learn about the war and relate to their subjects. The film follows the group of activists for three years after the war, watching them make change and become leaders of the new state as they recover from trauma and despair. A Normal Life was selected to show at 2003 documentary festivals like Tribeca, Woodstock, Montreal, and Copenhagen, and was also shown by the Carnegie Council for Ethics in International Affairs.

Vasarhelyi worked in 2004 as an assistant to director Mike Nichols on the film Closer and has worked extensively with Emmy Award-winning cinematographer Scott Duncan documenting events such as the Dakar Rally.

=== Solo directing ===
Vasarhelyi's second film, Youssou N'Dour: I Bring What I Love, was released in theaters in the United States and internationally. The film premiered at the Telluride and Toronto Film Festivals and won numerous awards including the Special Jury Prize at the Middle East International Film Festival in 2008 and a nomination for the Pare Lorentz Award at the 2009 International Documentary Association Awards. Vasarhelyi worked on the film for five years, moving to Africa for its production, and stated that this period was personally fulfilling but very tough on her relationships: at one point during shooting, she had to miss her grandmother's funeral. She wanted to make an uplifting, musical film about Africa, and she admired the film's subject, Youssou N'Dour, praising his voice and dedication to his principles. She stated that once you see his band, Super Etoile, "you'll follow them to the edge of the earth."

In 2013, Vasarhelyi completed Touba, a documentary on the annual Mouride pilgrimage, the Grand Magaal in Touba, Senegal. It premiered at SXSW 2013, where it won the Special Jury Prize for Best Cinematography.

She returned to Senegal to document the presidential elections of 2012. Incorruptible (formerly An African Spring), the story of Senegalese democracy, won the Independent Spirit Truer Than Fiction Award in 2015. In 2015, Brandon Wilson from IndieWire wrote that Vasarhelyi's "familiarity with the country pays dividends and elevates the piece from being just another tale of civic dysfunction on the African continent."

=== Sports documentaries ===
One of Vasarhelyi's films as a director include the highest grossing independent documentary film of 2015, Meru (Oscars Shortlist 2016; Sundance Audience Award 2015). Variety magazine said: "Jimmy Chin and E. Chai Vasarhelyi's Sundance audience award winner is one of the best sports documentaries of its type in recent years."

Vasarhelyi and Chin's 2018 film Free Solo won the People's Choice Award: Documentaries at the 2018 Toronto International Film Festival. The film has received critical acclaim as a riveting documentary and a profound story of human endeavor. Jeannette Catsoulis from The New York Times called Free Solo "an engaging study of a perfect match between passion and personality."

Vasarhelyi and Chin discuss filming the climb in their New York Times opinion piece, saying, "Throughout history, documentarians have had to struggle with the blurred lines of their responsibility to their subjects. We were haunted by the possibility that our presence might put him at more risk every time we turned on the cameras." Vasarhelyi has directed a New York Times Op Doc, an episode for Netflix's non-fiction design series ABSTRACT, and two episodes for ESPN's non-fiction series Future of Sports.

Free Solo won the 2019 Academy Award for Best Documentary Feature.

=== Nyad ===
In 2023, Vasarhelyi and Chin released their first fictional film, a sports drama dramatizing the story of Diana Nyad's 110-mile swim from Cuba to Key West, Florida. The directors stated they were drawn to the story because it featured an impossible dream and centered complex female stories. Vasarhelyi praised the lead actress, Annette Bening, for her embodiment of Nyad and her physical understanding of the narrative.

=== Recognition ===
Vasarhelyi has received grants from the Sundance Institute, the Ford Foundation, the Rockefeller Brothers Fund, Bertha Britdoc, the William and Mary Greve Foundation and the National Endowment of the Arts.

She was selected as a 2013 Sundance Documentary Film Fellow, named one of Filmmaker magazine's 25 New Faces of Independent Film in 2005^{[4]} and received an Achievement Award from Creative Visions foundation in 2008.

== Personal life ==
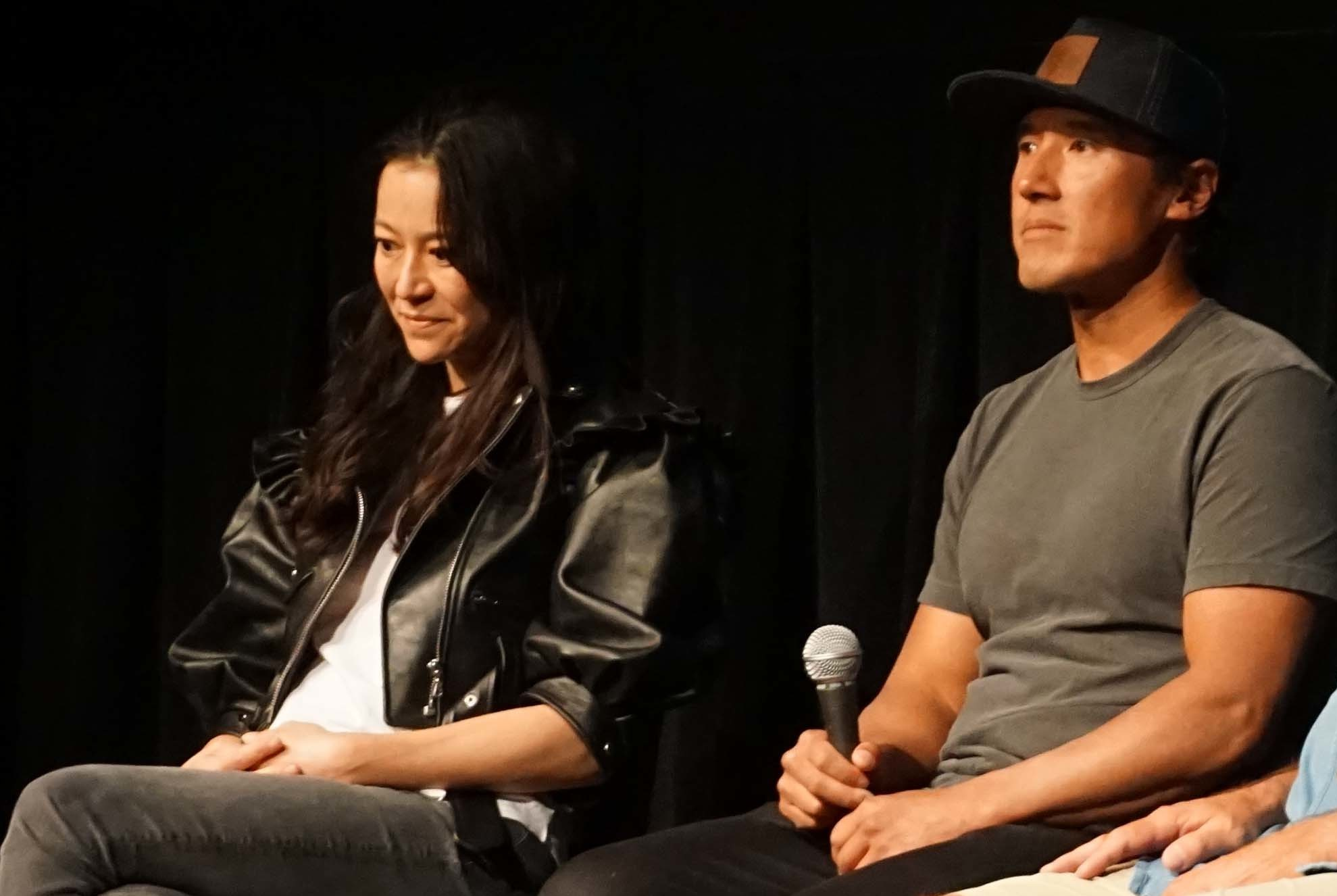
Vasarhelyi and Chin at a 2021 panel for The Rescue

Vasarhelyi married Jimmy Chin, a photographer for National Geographic and a professional skier and climber, on May 26, 2013. They have two children. Vasarhelyi met Chin at a conference at Lake Tahoe in 2012. Chin and Vasarhelyi filed for divorce in 2025.

== Awards ==
- 2003: Tribeca Film Festival Best Documentary Feature for A Normal Life
- 2008: Middle East International Film Festival Special Jury Prize for Youssou N'Dour: I Bring What I Love
- 2008: International Documentary Association Pare Lorentz Award (nominee) for Youssou N'Dour: I Bring What I Love
- 2008: Bahamas International Film Festival Audience Award for Youssou N'Dour: I Bring What I Love
- 2008: Bahamas International Film Festival Spirit of Freedom Award for Youssou N'Dour: I Bring What I Love
- 2008: DC International Film Festival Audience Award for Youssou N'Dour: I Bring What I Love
- 2008: São Paulo International Film Festival Audience Award for Youssou N'Dour: I Bring What I Love
- 2008: Nashville Film Festival Music of Impact Award for Youssou N'Dour: I Bring What I Love
- Toronto International Film Festival Special Presentation for Youssou N'Dour: I Bring What I Love
- 2013: SXSW Special Jury Prize for Best Cinematography for Touba
- 2015: Independent Spirit Truer Than Fiction Award Winner for Incorruptible
- 2015: Woodstock Film Festival Maverick Award for Best Feature Documentary for Incorruptible
- 2015: One World Film Festival Václav Havel Jury Award for Incorruptible
- 2015: Oscar Shortlist for Best Documentary Feature for Meru
- 2015: Sundance Audience Award Winner for Meru
- 2015: Independent Spirit Award Nomination for Best Documentary for Meru
- 2015: DGA Award Nomination for Outstanding Directorial Achievement in Documentary for Meru
- 2015: PGA Award Nomination for Outstanding Producer of Documentary Theatrical Motion Pictures for Meru
- 2015: Cinema Eye Honors Audience Choice Prize Winner for Meru
- 2015: Cinema Eye Honors Award Winner for Outstanding Achievement in Cinematography for Meru
- 2015: Cinema Eye Honors Award Nomination for Outstanding Achievement in Production for Meru
- 2015: Cinema Eye Honors Award Nomination for Outstanding Achievement in Original Music Score for Meru
- 2015: The New York Times, Critics' Pick for Meru
- 2016: Oscar's Shortlist for Meru
- 2018: People's Choice Documentary award at Toronto International Film Fest for Free Solo
- 2018: Mill Valley Film Festival Valley of the Docs People's Choice awards
- 2018: Virginia Film Festival Documentary Feature Audience Award
- 2018: Critics Choice Award for Best Documentary for Free Solo
- 2018: Critics Choice Award for Best Sports Documentary for Free Solo
- 2019: BAFTA Award for Best Documentary for Free Solo
- 2019: Academy Award for Best Documentary Feature for Free Solo
- 2019: Emmy Award for Outstanding Directing For A Documentary/Nonfiction Program - 2019 for Free Solo
- 2019: Emmy Award for Outstanding Creative Achievement in Interactive Media within an Unscripted Program - 2019 for Free Solo: 360
- 2021: Critics' Choice Documentary Award for Best Director for The Rescue
- 2022: News and Documentary Emmy Award for Outstanding Direction: Documentary for The Rescue
- 2024: Peabody Award for Photographer
- 2024: Cinema for Peace Dove nomination for Women's Empowerment in 2024 for film Nyad

== Filmography ==
- 2003: A Normal Life
- 2008: Youssou N'Dour: I Bring What I Love
- 2013: Touba
- 2015: Incorruptible
- 2015: Meru
- 2017: Abstract: The Art of Design (TV series documentary)
- 2018: Free Solo
- 2018: Enhanced (TV series documentary)
- 2021: The Rescue
- 2021: 14 Peaks: Nothing Is Impossible
- 2022: Return to Space
- 2022: Edge of the Unknown with Jimmy Chin
- 2023: Angel City (TV series documentary)
- 2023: Wild Life
- 2023: Nyad
- 2025: Lost in the Jungle
- 2025: Love+War
- 2026: Everest: The Other Side
- From the Edge (in production)
- Bartali (pre-production)
