= Love+War =

2025 American documentary film

- Theatrical release poster
- Directed by: Elizabeth Chai Vasarhelyi; Jimmy Chin
- Produced by: Elizabeth Chai Vasarhelyi; Jimmy Chin; Shannon Dill; Anna Barnes
- Cinematography: Thorsten Thielow
- Edited by: Keiko Deguchi; Hypatia Porter
- Music by: Claudia Sarne
- Production companies: National Geographic Documentary Films; Little Monster Films
- Distributed by: National Geographic Documentary Films
- Release dates: September 7, 2025 (TIFF); October 29, 2025
- Running time: 95 minutes
- Country: United States
- Languages: English; Ukrainian
- Box office: $22,424

Love+War is a 2025 American documentary film directed and produced by Elizabeth Chai Vasarhelyi and Jimmy Chin. It explores the life and career of photojournalist Lynsey Addario.

It had its world premiere at the 2025 Toronto International Film Festival on September 7, 2025, and was released in a limited release on October 29, 2025, prior to a broadcast on National Geographic on November 6, 2025.

== Premise ==
Explores the life and career of photojournalist Lynsey Addario.

== Release ==
It had its world premiere at the 2025 Toronto International Film Festival on September 7, 2025. It also screened at the Camden International Film Festival, Hamptons International Film Festival, 2025 BFI London Film Festival, Woodstock Film Festival, and AFI Fest. It was released in a limited release on October 29, 2025, prior to a broadcast on National Geographic on November 6, 2025, and Disney+ November 7, 2025.

== Reception ==
=== Critical reception ===
On the review aggregator website Rotten Tomatoes, 100% of 22 critics' reviews are positive, with an average rating of 7.8/10. Metacritic, which uses a weighted average, assigned the film a score of 71 out of 100, based on 8 critics, indicating "generally favorable" reviews.

Jason Gorber of Next Best Picture gave the film an eight out of ten, writing: "A film that's emotional, exhilarating, and essential, photographers capturing a photographer, game recognizing game, with highly skilled filmmakers finding another perfect subject in this internationally renowned photographer." Leslie Felperin of The Hollywood Reporter praised the film writing: "Fresh score. "What's quite novel about this work, as opposed to any number of well-made docs about (mostly male) war photographers, is that it directly addresses how Addario’s job impacts her as a mother."
