= Youssou N'Dour: I Bring What I Love =

- Directed by: Elizabeth Chai Vasarhelyi
- Written by: Elizabeth Chai Vasarhelyi
- Music by: James Newton Howard; Marty Davich
- Release date: 2008
- Running time: 102 minutes
- Country: United States
- Language: English

Youssou N'Dour: I Bring What I Love is a 2008 documentary film directed by filmmaker Elizabeth Chai Vasarhelyi that chronicles Senegalese icon Youssou N'Dour as he releases his Grammy Award-winning album Egypt and works to promote a more tolerant view of Islam. The film features musical superstar/activists Bono and Peter Gabriel. The documentary screened at festivals internationally including the Telluride Film Festival and Toronto International Film Festival in 2008, winning numerous audience awards as well the Special Jury Prize at the Middle East International Film Festival in 2008 and a nomination for the Pare Lorentz Award at the International Documentary Association Awards in 2009. The film premiered in New York City as the opening night of Brooklyn Academy of Music's Muslim Voices: Arts & Ideas Festival in 2009, and opened in theaters in the US and internationally to much acclaim. The film's soundtrack was released by Nonesuch Records in 2010.

== Synopsis ==
Youssou N’Dour: I Bring What I Love is a music-driven film that explores one man's power to inspire global change. The film unfolds at a pivotal moment in the life of Youssou N’Dour—the best-selling African pop artist of all time. N'Dour has long been renowned for bringing people of diverse nations and backgrounds together through his collaborations with such musical superstars as Bono, Paul Simon, and Peter Gabriel. But when he releases his most personal and spiritual album yet, he instead alienates his Muslim fans in Africa. Although he garners accolades in the West, N’Dour must brave controversy and rejection at home as he sets out to win his audience back.

Director Elizabeth Chai Vasarhelyi tracks N'Dour's journey over two years – filming his life in Africa, Europe, and America. He initially releases his album Egypt in the hopes of promoting a more tolerant face of Islam. Yet, when his fellow Senegalese reject the album, and denounce it as blasphemous, he takes this as a challenge to go deeper, to reach out to those who would attack him, and to work even harder to use his songs to unite a divided world. The resulting portrait is not just of a musician, but also that of a world in which pop culture now has equal power to incite fury and invite new connections.

== Production ==
Youssou N’dour: I Bring What I Love was the first feature-length documentary film by Elizabeth Chai Vasarhelyi, who also acted as producer on the film. A Groovy Griot Film In Association with 57th & Irving Productions, the film was executive produced by Edward Tyler Nahem, Jennifer Millstone, Patrick Morris, Jack Turner, Kathryn Tucker, and Miklos C.Vasarhelyi, and co-produced by Sarah Price, Gwyn Welles, Scott Duncan, and Hugo Berkeley. The film's cinematographers are Nick Doob (From Mao to Mozart; an Academy Award winner for Best Documentary Feature), Jojo Pennebaker (The War Room), six-time Emmy winner Scott Duncan (Olympic Games, Survivor), and Hugo Berkeley. The film's original score was composed by Emmy winner Martin Davich (Trinity) and six time Academy Award nominee James Newton Howard (Blood Diamond).

== Awards ==
- Special Jury Prize, 2008 Middle East International Film Festival
- Audience Award, 2009 DC International Film Festival
- Audience Award, 2008 São Paulo International Film Festival
- Impact of Music Award, 2009 Nashville Film Festival
- Audience Award, 2008 Bahamas International Film Festival
- Spirit of Freedom Award, 2008 Bahamas International Film Festival
- Special Presentation, 2008 Toronto International Film Festival
- Finalist, 2009 International Documentary Association Pare Lorentz Award

== Press ==
- Christopher John Farley, "Putting Faith in His Music", Wall Street Journal: June 5, 2009
- Jonathan Curiel, "Review: Singer, music soar in 'Youssou N'Dour'", San Francisco Chronicle: July 31, 2009
- Washington Post: October 9, 2009
- Roger Ebert, "'Youssou N’Dour: I Bring What I Love", Chicago Sun-Times: August 26, 2009
- Ann Powers, "'Youssou N'Dour: I Bring What I Love'", LA Times: July 2, 2009
- Zachary Karabell, "Youssou N’Dour and 'I Bring What I Love': An Elegaic Meditation on Faith, Islam and Music", Huffington Post: June 12, 2009
- "Youssou N’Dour", WNET's Sunday Arts: June 7, 2009
- John Gddard, "Heart of brightness", Thestar.com: September 6, 2008
- Tim Perlich, "Faith healing", NOW Magazine: September 2, 2008
