= Xu Jing (mountaineer) =

Chinese mountaineer

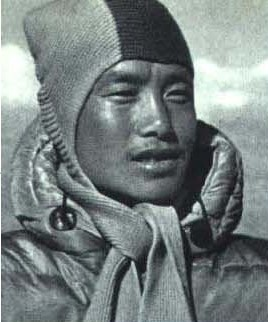
Xu Jing in 1964

Xu Jing (Chinese: 许竞; pinyin: Xǔ Jìng, 1927 – 15 October 2011) was a Chinese mountaineer and leader of the first team to reach the summit of Shishapangma, Tibet on 2 May 1964. In 1965 this area would become the Tibet Autonomous Region.

Xu Jing was born in Fushun, Liaoning, China. He learned mountaineering in the Soviet Union in 1955. In 1956, Xu Jing took charge of China's first mountaineering training program organized by All-China Federation of Trade Unions. The same year, he climbed Muztagh Ata in a joint Sino-Soviet expedition. In 1960, he was the deputy leader of the Chinese Mount Everest expedition team, but had to retreat at 8500 m due to exhaustion. In 1964, Xu Jing led a team to the summit of Shishapangma, the last unclimbed eight-thousander. In 1975, he was the deputy leader of the Chinese expedition team that successfully climbed and surveyed Mount Everest. In 1988, he was the deputy leader of the China-Japan-Nepal joint Mount Everest "crossover" team. Xu Jing was vice-president of China Mountaineering Association. Xu died on 15 October 2011 due to liver cancer. He was aged 84.
