= Return to Space =

2022 American documentary film

- Promotional poster
- Directed by: Jimmy Chin; Elizabeth Chai Vasarhelyi
- Produced by: Anna Barnes; Jimmy Chin; Elizabeth Chai Vasarhelyi
- Music by: Mychael Danna; Harry Gregson-Williams
- Production company: Little Monster Films
- Distributed by: Netflix
- Release date: April 7, 2022
- Running time: 128 minutes
- Country: United States
- Language: English

Return to Space is an American documentary film made for Netflix and directed by Jimmy Chin and Elizabeth Chai Vasarhelyi. Its story follows Elon Musk's and SpaceX employees' two-decade mission to send NASA astronauts back to the International Space Station and revolutionize space travel. The film was released on April 7, 2022.

== Synopsis ==
The film tells a story of SpaceX from their Falcon 1 and re-usable Falcon 9 to the Crew Dragon Demo-2, launched on 30 May 2020 with Doug Hurley and Bob Behnken aboard.

== Featuring ==
- Elon Musk, founder of SpaceX
- Bob Behnken, astronaut
- Doug Hurley, astronaut
- Jim Bridenstine, head of NASA
- Tim Dodd of Everyday Astronaut
- Kiko Dontchev of SpaceX
- Lori Garver, Deputy Administrator of NASA
- Hans Koenigsmann, Chief Engineer of SpaceX
- Gwynne Shotwell, COO of SpaceX
- Lars Blackmore, Chief of Entry, Descent and Landing of SpaceX
- Karen Nyberg, astronaut and wife of Doug Hurley
- Megan McArthur, astronaut, member of SpaceX Crew-2 mission, wife of Bob Behnken
- Balachandar Ramamurthy of SpaceX
- Anna Menon of SpaceX

== Reception ==
The film received mixed reviews. IndieWire called it an "Exasperating 2-Hour Commercial for Elon Musk"; a Wired review, meanwhile, points that the film "chronicles the company’s unlikely rise, but it avoids talking about its shortcomings". The review by Decider was more favourable, saying: "While a large part of Return to Space plays like a SpaceX promotional video, the meaningful way the film tells the story of a group of hopeful dreamers makes it more than worth your while." The review by Joe Morgenstern on the Wall Street Journal was also favourable while noting the promotional tone, writing: "In fact, it promotes the company quite effectively, and why not? Elon Musk’s aerospace venture has achieved remarkable things since it was founded two decades ago. The film is more than that, though. It’s a return to dramatic accounts of blastoffs, followed by soul-filling footage from beyond our sheltering atmosphere and implacable gravity; a portrait, by reflected light from fiery boosters, of one of Earth’s most curious (in every respect) overachievers; and a testament to failing upward—far, far upward."
