= Timex Expedition WS4 =

Digital watch produced by Timex

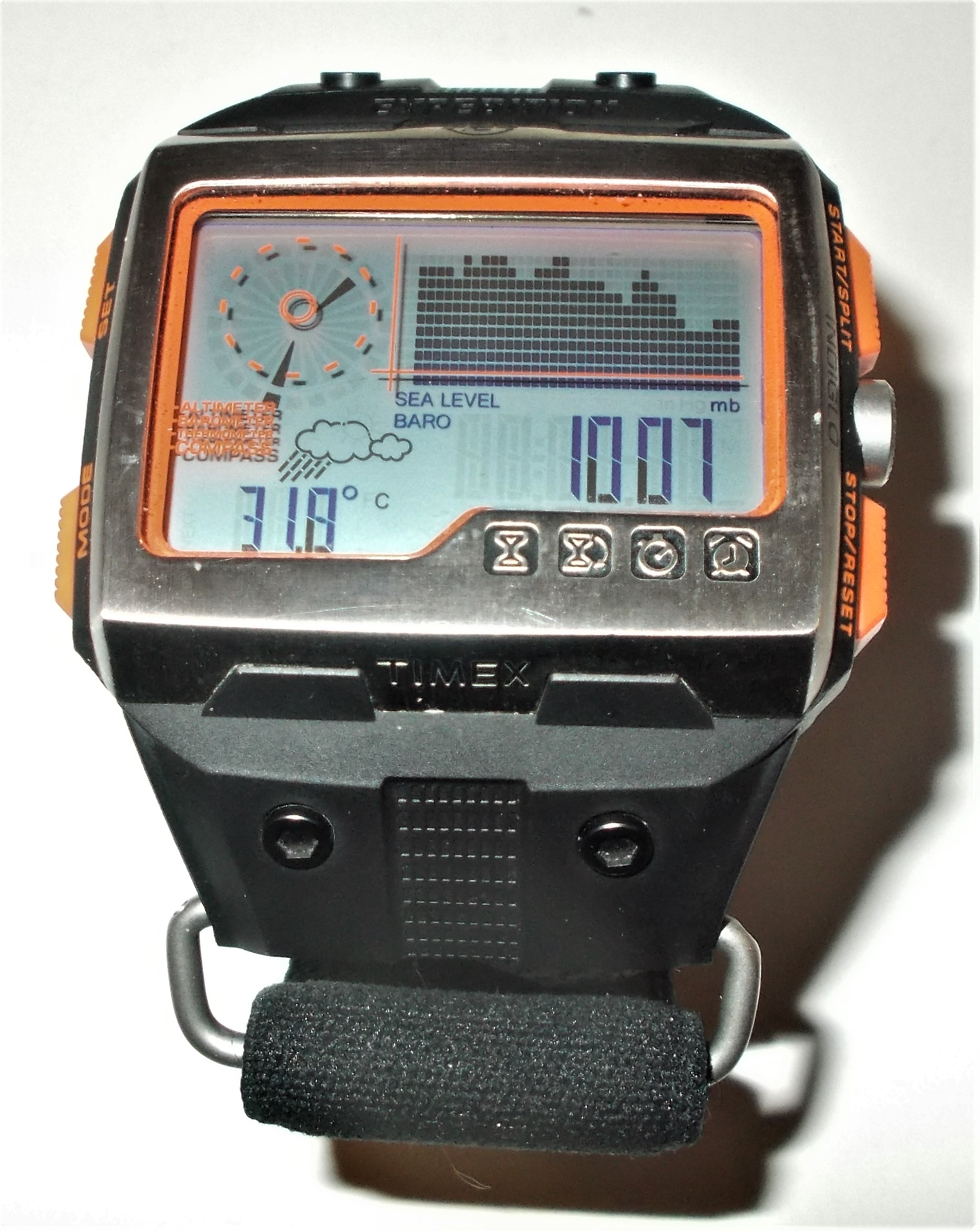
The Timex Expedition WS4 in time display mode. The temperature displays 31.8 degrees Celsius while the clouds and rain icon indicates the barometric pressure trend is negative, forecasting deteriorating weather conditions ahead with possible rain.

The Timex Expedition WS4 is a multifunction digital watch produced by Timex. In addition to regular timekeeping, it features barometer, altimeter, thermometer, compass, and weather forecast functions. "WS4" stands for "Wide Screen 4 Functions". It was introduced in May 2009.

The watch was field tested by American climber and adventurer Conrad Anker during an expedition to Garhwal Himalaya in 2008. It was number 4 of "7 Best Outdoor Gear Picks for 2009" by Popular Mechanics. The watch is also on the "Seven advanced watches that do more than just tell time" list of The Economic Times.

Its face resembles the rear window of a Land Rover. Its compass function takes into consideration the magnetic declination of a city so that the compass can point to the true North while geolocated in that city.

== Design and features ==
The watch features a wide screen LCD designed to show multiple information displays at once without the need to change modes. The reason for that is that during expeditions, the user must be able to see as much information as possible without the distraction of having to press buttons to retrieve the data. Timex calls the display a "multifunction dashboard". The display is also referred to as "widescreen dashboard".

The watch features a barometer whose output is updated every hour in the form of a graphical display. This creates a barometric pressure chart which was used by Conrad Anker during his Himalaya expedition to predict the weather based on the atmospheric pressure trends; if the pressure decreased suddenly with no subsequent upward trend, it was a sign of an approaching storm, while a gradual pressure increase indicated improving weather.

During the pre-product launch testing, Anker suggested several modifications to the design of the watch, such as less sensitive buttons and the creation of a lanyard version which would enable climbers to wear the watch around their neck, keeping their hands free. Timex incorporated Anker's suggestions into the final product design.

The watch has also a review function which displays graphically the variation of parameters such as temperature, pressure, and altitude as a function of time for the duration of an excursion.

The Timex Expedition WS4 in time display mode. The temperature displays 28.1 degrees Celsius while the sun icon indicates the barometric pressure trend is positive, forecasting improving weather ahead. The digital time is also displayed through an LCD watch with analogue hands located on the upper left corner of the dashboard.

Timex Expedition WS4 in barometric chart mode. The trend of the barometric chart is negative, indicating decreasing atmospheric pressure, thus the cloud icon, just above the temperature display, indicates deteriorating or cloudy weather ahead. The time is indicated by the LCD analogue display watch on the upper left corner of the dashboard.

== Reception ==
The Gizmodo reviewer comments that "Man, I don't even ski and I want this." and that he desires the functionality of the watch "even if [he] can't envision a scenario when [he] would ever use it".

Engadget mentions that "We haven't had a chance to do all the rock climbing, mountain biking, and sumo wrestling we plan on using this watch for, but we already feel stronger, smarter, more aware of the outside temperature, and way better looking. After we take on a crew of zombie Nazis, ride in a barrel over Niagara Falls, and spend 24 hours encased in ice, we'll let you know how it holds up. Until then, enjoy the pics."

Boing Boing comments: "The new Timex Expedition WS4 is a lot of watch: altimeter, barometer, thermometer, chronograph, alarm and compass. It even tells time! It's also unapologetically macho which not venturing too far into the land of overwrought wrist weights."

Popular Mechanics refers to the large display of the watch which makes it easy to read multiple outputs without having to scroll using the mode button and adds that "While this may be useful for climbers who have their hands full gripping cliff faces, it could be just as practical for strap-hanging subway riders who are jammed between fellow commuters".

The New Yorker reviewer calls the watch " [the] can-do Timex Expedition WS4" then goes on to enumerate its functions, concluding that "its face is the shape of the rear window of a Land Rover."

Gear Junkie describes the watch as looking "like something Dick Tracy would wear".
