= Alex Lowe (mountaineer) =

American mountaineer (1958-1999)

- Alex Lowe on Annapurna III in 1996.
- Born: Stewart Alexander Lowe; December 24, 1958; Frederick, Maryland, United States
- Died: October 5, 1999 (aged 40); Shishapangma, Tibet
- Occupations: Mountaineer, climber
- Spouse: Jennifer Lowe (m. 1982-1999)
- Website: www.alexlowe.org

Stewart Alexander Lowe (24 December 1958 – 5 October 1999) was an American mountaineer known for difficult ascents on rock, ice, and high-altitude peaks worldwide. He established new routes in the Himalayas, Karakoram, and the Tetons, and made first ascents in Antarctica and on Baffin Island. In 1995, he received the American Alpine Club's Underhill Award for outstanding mountaineering achievement. Lowe was killed in an avalanche on Shishapangma in Tibet in 1999, during an expedition that aimed to produce the first American ski descent of an 8,000-meter peak. Lowe's remains were discovered in the glacier in 2016. The Alex Lowe Charitable Foundation was established in his name. He was posthumously declared "the world's best climber" by Outside Magazine, and Alex Lowe Peak in Montana was officially named after him in 2005.

== Biography ==
=== Rescue on Denali ===
In June 1995, Lowe helped the National Park Service rescue several Spanish climbers on 20,320-foot (6,190 m) Denali in Alaska. On 9 June, the group had been trapped for four days at 19,200 feet (5,900 m). Before a rescue team could assemble, one of the climbers fell 4,200 feet (1,300 m) to his death from the mountain's Upper West Rib. The surviving climbers were all suffering from hypothermia. Lowe, Mark Twight and Scott Backes were lifted by military helicopter to a plateau above the Spaniards, scaled down a 400-vertical foot, 50-degree slope of ice and rock, to reach them and determined that one needed immediate evacuation. Amid snowy conditions, he at first dragged, then carried him on his back up the steep slope at high altitude.

== Death on Shishapangma ==
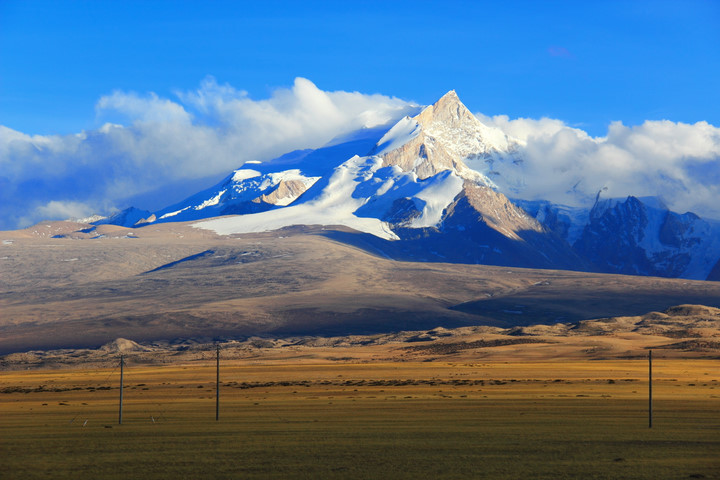
Shishapangma

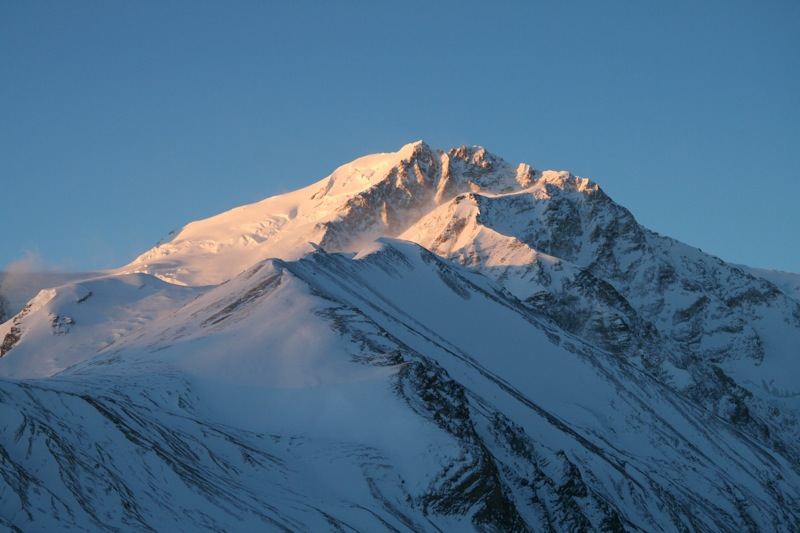
Shishapangma

In September 1999, Lowe, Conrad Anker and David Bridges (a two-time US national paragliding champion) traveled to the 26,291-foot (8,013 m) Himalayan giant Shishapangma, the 14th highest peak in the world, as part of the 1999 American Shishapangma Ski Expedition.

Plans called for Lowe and Anker to be part of the team that would ski down, to become the first Americans to ski down from the summit of an 8,000-metre (26,000 ft) peak; while Bridges was part of a three-man film team that was to shoot an NBC documentary of the expedition for The North Face. Lowe commented:

It's been a passionate goal of mine to ski off an 8,000 meter peak. I guess there's a lot of people sort of looking to do this and try to ski off Everest. But for me, it's got to be an aesthetic and quality run. And Shishapangma has the best ski line of any of the 8,000 meter peaks. It's just an absolutely straight shot right down the Southwest Face. That's going to be a good one.

On 5 October, they split into two teams as they searched for a route up the mountain. Lowe's group (Lowe, Anker and Bridges) were crossing a flat glacier when a large serac broke loose 6,000 feet (1,800 m) above and tumbled downhill. The 500-foot (150 m)-wide avalanche swept over the three men. Anker was thrown 100 feet (30 m) by the windblast, and suffered a lacerated head, two broken ribs, and dislocated shoulder, but emerged from the snow, and led a 20-hour rescue attempt in the large debris field measuring up to 20 feet (6.1 m) deep. Neither body was found at the time, but almost seventeen years later, on 27 April 2016, climbers Ueli Steck and David Göttler came across the remains of the two climbers emerging from the glacier.

=== Memorial Fund/Alex Lowe Charitable Foundation ===
Lowe was survived by his wife Jennifer and three sons, Max, Sam, and Isaac. The Alex Lowe Charitable Foundation was established in his honor to provide direction and financial support to humanitarian programs in mountain regions around the world. Their work includes the Khumbu Climbing Center for indigenous people of Nepal. In 2001 Jennifer married Lowe's climbing partner and best friend Conrad Anker.

Jennifer Lowe-Anker published a memoir, Forget Me Not in 2008, that recounts her life shared with Lowe, his death and the life she continued with Anker. Forget Me Not won the National Outdoor Book award for literature in 2008.

== Legacy ==
In 1995, Lowe received the American Alpine Club's Underhill Award for outstanding mountaineering achievement, the highest honor in U.S. mountaineering. He climbed for nearly 10 years with The North Face professional climbing team. After Lowe's death, Outside Magazine posthumously declared him "the world's best climber," adding, "No matter how jaw-dropping his routes, Lowe's real genius grew out of the way he combined physical accomplishments with an indomitable spirit."

=== Alex Lowe Peak ===
Formerly known by its elevation as Peak 10,031, Alex Lowe Peak, south of Bozeman, Montana in the Gallatin National Forest was officially named after him in September 2005. In spring of 1997, Lowe had climbed the northern couloir with friend Hans Saari; and the two had made the first ski descent from the summit, down what they named "Hellmouth Couloir."

== Climbing and skiing resumé ==
=== Notable climbs ===
- First ascents
  - Rakekniven, Queen Maud Land (Antarctica), January 1997
  - Great Sail Peak, Baffin Island, 1998
- New routes
  - Kwangde Nup, Nepal, 1989
  - Kusum Kanguru, Nepal, 1990
  - Northwest Chimney, Grand Teton, Wyoming, 1991
  - Peak 4810, Ak-Su region, Kyrgyzstan, 1995
  - Great Trango Tower, Pakistan, 1999, NW face, new route
- Other climbs
  - Matterhorn (Alps, Switzerland)
  - K2, Pakistan, China, 1986 (attempt)
  - Mount Everest, South Col Route, Nepal, 1990 and 1993 (attempt of its Kangshung Face in 1994)
  - Gasherbrum IV, Pakistan, 1992 (attempt)
  - Khan Tengri, Kyrgyzstan (August 1993), solo ascent in 10 hours and 8 minutes (broke the former speed climbing record by four hours)
  - Aconcagua, Argentina, 1993 and 1994
  - Annapurna IV, Nepal, 1996 (attempt)
  - Mount Rundle, Canadian Rockies, spring 1996, "Troubled Dreams", first free ascent of one of the most difficult mixed climbs in the Canadian Rockies

=== Skiing ===
- First descents
  - Hellmouth Couloir, Alex Lowe Peak (formerly Peak 10,031), Montana, 1997
  - Northwest Couloir, Middle Teton, Wyoming, 1992
  - Enclosure Couloir, Grand Teton, Wyoming, 1994

== See also ==
- List of Mount Everest summiters by number of times to the summit
