= Shishapangma =

14th highest mountain on Earth

- Xixabangma
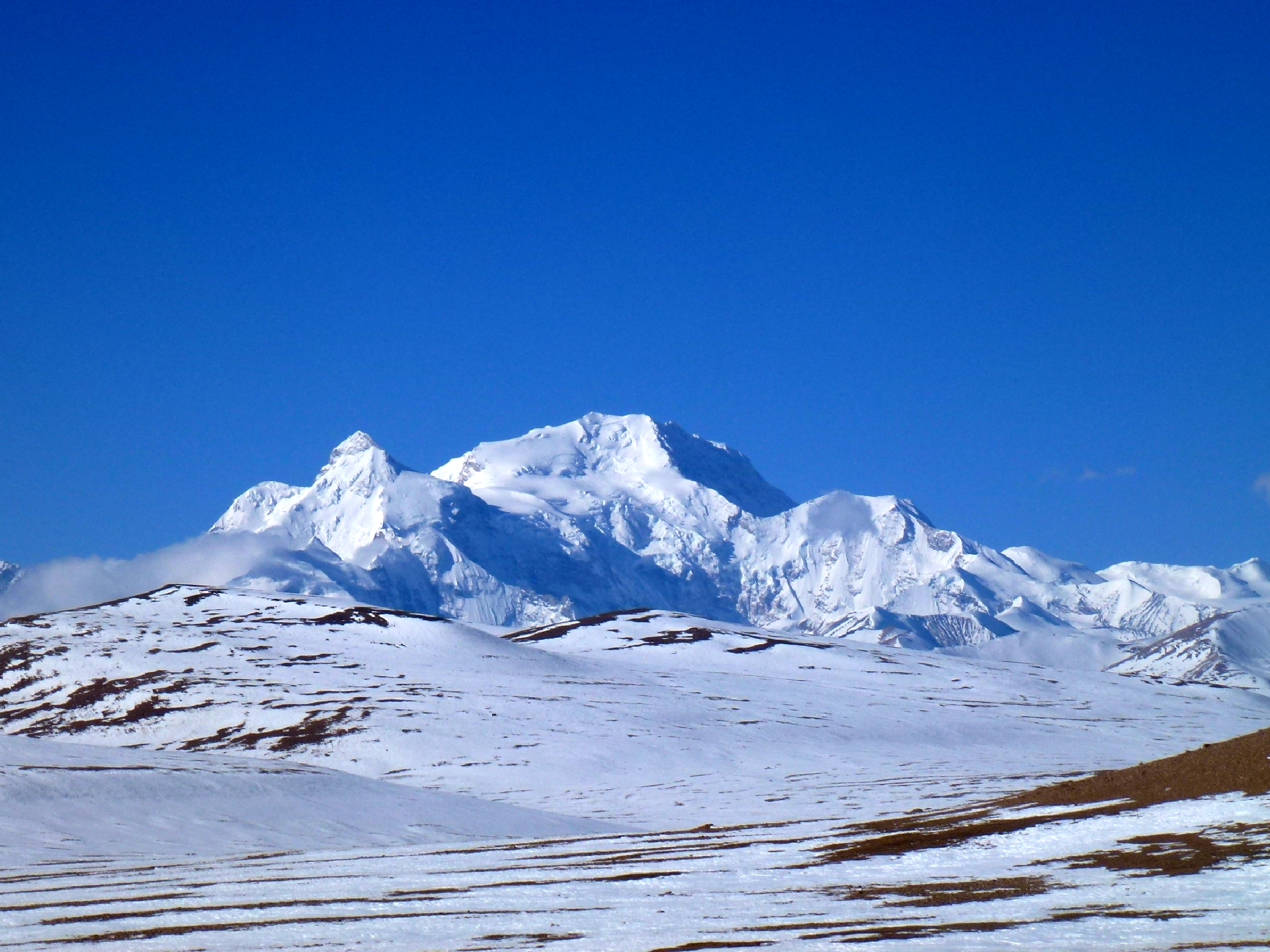
- Shishapangma

Highest point
- Elevation: 8,027 m (26,335 ft); Ranked 14th
- Prominence: 2,897 m (9,505 ft); Ranked 111th
- Listing: Eight-thousander; Ultra
- Coordinates: 28°21′08″N 85°46′47″E

Geography
- The major peaks (not mountains) above 7,500 m (24,600 ft) height in Himalayas, rank identified in Himalayas alone (not the world). Legend: 1：Mount Everest; 2：Kangchenjunga; 3：Lhotse; 4：Yalung Kang, Kanchenjunga West; 5：Makalu; 6：Kangchenjunga South; 7：Kangchenjunga Central; 8：Cho Oyu; 9：Dhaulagiri; 10：Manaslu (Kutang); 11：Nanga Parbat (Diamer); 12：Annapurna; 13：Shishapangma (Shishasbangma, Xixiabangma); 14：Manaslu East; 15：Annapurna East Peak; 16： Gyachung Kang; 17：Annapurna II; 18：Tenzing Peak (Ngojumba Kang, Ngozumpa Kang, Ngojumba Ri); 19：Kangbachen; 20：Himalchuli (Himal Chuli); 21：Ngadi Chuli (Peak 29, Dakura, Dakum, Dunapurna); 22：Nuptse (Nubtse); 23：Nanda Devi; 24：Chomo Lonzo (Chomolonzo, Chomolönzo, Chomo Lönzo, Jomolönzo, Lhamalangcho); 25：Namcha Barwa (Namchabarwa); 26：Zemu Kang (Zemu Gap Peak); 27：Kamet; 28：Dhaulagiri II; 29：Ngojumba Kang II; 30：Dhaulagiri III; 31：Kumbhakarna Mountain (Mount Kumbhakarna, Jannu); 32：Gurla Mandhata (Naimona'nyi, Namu Nan); 33：Hillary Peak (Ngojumba Kang III); 34：Molamenqing (Phola Gangchen); 35：Dhaulagiri IV; 36：Annapurna Fang; 37：Silver Crag; 38：Kangbachen Southwest; 39：Gangkhar Puensum (Gangkar Punsum); 40：Annapurna III; 41：Himalchuli West; 42：Annapurna IV; 43：Kula Kangri; 44：Liankang Kangri (Gangkhar Puensum North, Liangkang Kangri); 45：Ngadi Chuli South; Tibet Autonomous Region
- Location: Nyalam County, Tibet Autonomous Region, China
- Parent range: Himalayas

Climbing
- First ascent: 2 May 1964 by Chinese team: Xu Jing; Zhang Junyan; Wang Fuzhou; Wu Zongyue; Chen San; Soinam Dorjê; Cheng Tianliang; Migmar Zhaxi; Dorjê; Yun Deng (First winter ascent 14 January 2005 by Piotr Morawski and Simone Moro)
- Easiest route: snow/ice climb

Shishapangma

Chinese name
- Simplified Chinese: 高僧赞峰
Transcriptions
Standard Mandarin
- Hanyu Pinyin: Gāosēngzàn Fēng

Alternative Chinese name
- Traditional Chinese: 希夏邦馬峰
- Simplified Chinese: 希夏邦马峰
Transcriptions
Standard Mandarin
- Hanyu Pinyin: Xīxiàbāngmǎ Fēng

Tibetan name
- Tibetan: ཤི་ཤ་སྦང་མ།
Transcriptions
- Wylie: shi sha sbang ma
- Tibetan Pinyin: Xixabangma

Nepalese name
- Nepalese: शिशापाङ्मा Shishāpāngmā or गोसाईथान Gōsāīthān

Shishapangma, or Shishasbangma or Xixiabangma (Chinese: 希夏邦马; pinyin: Xī xià bāng mǎ), is the 14th-highest mountain in the world, at 8,027 metres (26,335 ft) above sea level. The lowest 8,000 metre peak, it is located entirely within Tibet.

== Name ==
Geologist Toni Hagen explained the name as meaning a "grassy plain" or "meadow" (pangma) above a "comb" or a "range" (shisha or chisa) in the local Tibetan language, thereby signifying the "crest above the grassy plains".

On the other hand, Tibetologist Guntram Hazod records a local story that explains the mountain's name in terms of its literal meaning in the Standard Tibetan language: shisha, which means "meat of an animal that died of natural causes", and sbangma, which means "malt dregs left over from brewing beer". According to the story, one year a heavy snowfall killed most of the animals at pasture. All that the people living near the mountain had to eat was the meat of the dead animals and the malt dregs left over from brewing beer, and so the mountain was named Shisha Pangma (shisha sbangma), signifying "meat of dead animals and malty dregs".

The alternative Nepali name of the mountain, Gosainthan, derives from Sanskrit and means "place of the saint" or "abode of God". The name is in use in popular literature. For example, in the comic strip Tintin in Tibet, a fictional Air India flight had crashed at Gosainthan. Tintin, Captain Haddock and the Sherpa team traveled to Gosainthan in search of Chang Chong-Chen.

== Geography ==
Shishapangma is located in south-central Tibet, five kilometres from the border with Nepal. It and Nanga Parbat are the only eight-thousanders entirely within Chinese and Pakistan territory respectively. It is also the highest peak in the Jugal Himal, which is contiguous with and often considered part of Langtang Himal. The Jugal/Langtang Himal straddles the Tibet/Nepal border. Since Shishapangma is on the dry north side of the Himalayan crest and farther from the lower terrain of Nepal, it has less dramatic vertical relief than most major Himalayan peaks.

Shishapangma also has a subsidiary peak higher than 8,000 m, Central Peak, at 8,008 m (26,273 ft).

== Ascents and attempts ==
Some of Shishapangma's ascents are not well verified, or still in dispute, with climbers potentially having only reached the slightly lower west peak at 7,966 m (26,135 ft) or the central peak at 8,008 m (26,273 ft), which is still almost two hours of dangerous ridge-climbing from the 19-metre-higher (62 ft) true summit at 8,027 m (26,335 ft). Himalayan chronicler and record keeper Elizabeth Hawley famously got Ed Viesturs (amongst others) to re-climb the true main summit of Shishapangma in his quest to climb all 14 eight-thousanders, as she would not accept central (or west) summit ascents as being full ascents of Shishapangma for her Himalayan Database.

Thirty-six people have died climbing Shishapangma, including Americans Alex Lowe and Dave Bridges in 1999, veteran Portuguese climber Bruno Carvalho, and noted Bulgarian climber Boyan Petrov, who disappeared on 3 May 2018. Nevertheless, Shishapangma is considered one of the easiest eight-thousanders to climb. The most common ascent, via the North Route, traverses the northwest face and northeast ridge and face, and has relatively easy access, with vehicle travel possible to base camp at 5,000 m (16,400 ft). Routes on the steeper southwest face are more technically demanding and involve 2,200 metres (7,220 ft) of ascent on a 50-degree slope.

=== First ascent ===
Shishapangma was first climbed, via the Northern Route, on 2 May 1964 by a Chinese expedition led by Xǔ Jìng. In addition to Xǔ Jìng, the summit team consisted of Zhāng Jùnyán (张俊岩), Wang Fuzhou, Wū Zōngyuè (邬宗岳), Chén Sān (陈三), Soinam Dorjê (索南多吉), Chéng Tiānliàng (成天亮), Migmar Zhaxi (米马扎西), Dorjê (多吉), and Yún Dēng (云登). It was the last unascended eight-thousander.

=== Later ascents and attempts ===
- 1980: 7 May, "Northern Route", (second ascent) by Michael Dacher, Wolfgang Schaffert, Gunter Sturm, Fritz Zintl, Sigi Hupfauer and Manfred Sturm (12 May); as part of a German expedition.
- 1980: 13 October, "Northern Route", (3rd ascent) by Ewald Putz and Egon Obojes, as part of an Austrian expedition.
- 1981: 30 April, "Northern Route", (4th ascent) by Junko Tabei, Rinzing Phinzo and Gyalbu Jiabu, as part of a Japanese women's expedition.
- 1981: 28 May, "Northern Route", (5th ascent) by Reinhold Messner (Italy) and Friedl Mutschlechner (Italy), as part of an Austrian expedition.
- 1982: 28 May, "British Route", southwest face, also known as "Right-hand couloir" (alpine style), FA by Doug Scott, Alex MacIntyre and Roger Baxter-Jones (all UK). This route follows the right-hand couloir on the southwest face.
- 1987: 18 September, Elsa Ávila and Carlos Carsolio become the first Mexicans to summit Shishapangma. This was Ávila's first eight-thousander and Carsolio's second, via the northern face/ridge to the central summit, then along the arete to the main summit, with Wanda Rutkiewicz, Ramiro Navarrete, and Ryszard Warecki.
- 1987: 18 September, the two Poles Jerzy Kukuczka and Artur Hajzer, climbing alpine style, made the first ascent of the west ridge and the western peak 7,966 metres (26,135 ft) then continued to traverse the summit ridge to reach the central peak 8,008 metres (26,273 ft) and finally the main summit. Kukuczka then skied down from near the main summit. This was the last of his fourteen eight-thousanders.
- 1987: 19 September, central couloir, north face, FA by Alan Hinkes (UK) and Steve Untch (US).
- 1989: 19 October, Central buttress, southwest face, FA by Andrej Stremfelj and Pavle Kozjek.
- 1990: Left-hand couloir, southwest face (not reaching the main summit), Wojciech Kurtyka (Poland), FA by Erhard Loretan (Switzerland) and Jean Troillet (Switzerland).
- 1993: Far-right couloir, southwest face, FA solo by Krzysztof Wielicki (Poland).
- 1993: May 22, Marcos Couch and Nicolás De la Cruz (Argentinian expedition).
- 1994: Left-hand couloir, southwest face (not reaching the main summit), Erik Decamp (France), Catherine Destivelle (France).
- 1996: 9 October, Anatoli Boukreev completed a solo ascent.
- 1999: 28 September, Edmond Joyeusaz (Italy), first ski descent from central summit.
- 2002: 5 May, "Korean Route" on southwest face, FA by Park-jun Hun and Kang-yeon Ryoung (both South Korean).
- 2002: 26 October: Tomaž Humar (Slovenia), Maxut Zhumayev, Denis Urubko, Alexey Raspopov and Vassily Pivtsov got to the summit. Humar climbed last 200 m (80°/50–60°, 200 m) of ascent and descent (65–75°, 700 m).
- 2004: 11 December, Jean-Christophe Lafaille (France) provoked controversy when he climbed the "British Route" on the southwest face, solo, and claimed a winter ascent. Since this was not calendar winter, he changed his claim to an ascent "in winter conditions."
- 2005: 14 January, first (calendar) winter ascent by Piotr Morawski (Poland) and Simone Moro (Italy) who climbed the south face by the "Slovenian route". Morawski & Moro had made a winter attempt the previous year, on 17 January 2004 they reached the summit plateau at 7,700m but because of the late hour they faced an unplanned bivouac and a high likelihood of frostbite so they returned to camp, the attempt was abandoned the following day in the face of deteriorating weather.
- 2006: First Portuguese expedition reaching the top of the mountain. João Garcia, Hélder Santos, Rui Rosado, Bruno Carvalho and Ana Santos Silva reached the summit, but Bruno Carvalho died on the descent.
- 2011: 16–17 April, Ueli Steck (Switzerland) soloed the southwest face in 10.5 hours, leaving base camp (5,306m) at 10:30 pm on 16 April and returning to base camp 20 hours later.
- 2014: September 24, Sebastian Haag died along with the Italian mountaineer Andrea Zambaldi in an avalanche. Haag was 36 years old.
- 2018: May 3, Bulgarian climber Boyan Petrov disappeared after having been last seen at Camp 3 (~7,400 m). A subsequent two-week search effort found only a few personal items and medicine.
- 2019: October 29, Nirmal Purja (Nepal) made it to the top of Shishapangma six months and six days after summiting his first 8000-metre peak as part of his Project Possible to climb all 14 eight-thousanders in seven months.

== See also ==
- List of deaths on Shishapangma
- List of ultras of the Himalayas

== Sources ==
- A Photographic Record of the Mount Shisha Pangma Scientific Expedition. Science Press Peking, 1966.
- Scott, Doug; MacIntyre, Alex (2000) [1984]. Shisha Pangma: The Alpine Style First Ascent of the South-West Face. Seattle: The Mountaineers Books. ISBN 0-89886-723-1.
- Venables, Stephen; Fanshawe, Andy (1996). Himalaya Alpine-Style: The Most Challenging Routes on the Highest Peaks. Seattle: Mountaineers Books. ISBN 0-89886-456-9.
- Sale, Richard; Cleare, John (2000): On Top of the World (Climbing the World's 14 Highest Mountains), lists of ascents, HarperCollins Publishers, ISBN 978-0-00-220176-6.
