= 1960 Chinese Mount Everest expedition =

First North Ridge ascent of Mount Everest

The 1960 Chinese Mount Everest expedition was the first to successfully ascend Mount Everest via the North Ridge. Wang Fuzhou, Gonpo, and Qu Yinhua reached the summit at 4:20 a.m. on 25 May. While the ascent to the summit is generally recognized, some Western professional climbers doubt the veracity of the Chinese claim.

== Preparation ==
In 1955, four athletes, led by Xu Jing, went to Soviet Transcaucasia to study mountaineering on an invitation from the Soviet Union. In 1957, six mountaineers, including Shi Zhanchun and Liu Lianman, set a Chinese mountaineering record by summitting Minya Konka. The same year, the Soviet Union proposed a joint Mount Everest expedition to China. The expedition was scheduled for May 1959, but was postponed to 1960 due to the 1959 Tibetan uprising. A 380 km-long road was built from Shigatse to Everest Base Camp, and a weather station was established. The Sino-Soviet split cancelled the expedition, and the Soviets withdrew their equipment. China allocated US$700,000 to purchase mountaineering equipment from Switzerland, a cost comparable to that of the 1st National Games of China.

Summitting Mount Everest was considered a "national task" to support the upcoming China-Nepal border negotiations; the status of Mount Everest was still disputed. In February 1960, the expedition team was formed with 214 members. The directory was Han Fudong, a veteran of the Battle of Tashan. Shi Zhanchun and Xu Jing were team and deputy leaders, respectively. The team also included geomorphologist Wang Ming Ye.

== Acclimatization expeditions ==
On 3 March 1960, the team of 192 members arrived at Everest Base Camp with several tonnes of equipment. Camps 1 to 3 were placed at the base of East Rongbuk Glacier ((5,400 m (17,700 ft)), the central part of the glacier (5,900 m (19,400 ft)), and under the North Col (6,400 m (21,000 ft)), respectively.

On 19 March, the main members of the climbing team arrived at the Base Camp. The first acclimatization expedition started on 25 March, moved equipment to Camp 3, and found a route past the North Col. The second expedition from 6 April placed Camp 4 at an altitude of 7,007 m (22,989 ft). The third expedition from 29 April was tasked with placing the Advance Camp at 8,500 m (27,900 ft), but only reached 7,600 m (24,900 ft) by the evening due to strong winds. In the evening of 2 May, Shi Zhanchun, Xu Jing, Lhakpa Tsering and Migmar charted a route up to 8,100 m (26,600 ft). Lhakpa Tsering and Migmar descended to 7,600 m (24,900 ft) to assist the transport team. Lhakpa Tsering returned to 8,100 m (26,600 ft) with three transport team members, including Gonpo, and set up camp. Shi Zhanchun climbed the Second Step and selected a route to the summit.

After the third expedition, frostbite caused more than 50 team members, including Shi Zhanchun, to withdraw. Marshal He Long was monitoring progress from Beijing and ordered the summiting to proceed. The final expedition set off on 17 May. In the afternoon of 23 May, Xu Jing, Wang Fuzhou, Liu Lianman and Gonpo set up the Advance Camp at 8,500 m (27,900 ft). where they were joined by Qu Yinhua and the transport team.

== Final expedition ==
The four-member summitting team set off at 9 a.m. on 24 May. Xu Jing became exhausted and was replaced by Qu Yinhua. At 12 p.m., they reached the Second Step. After several unsuccessful attempts to climb over the Step's last section, Liu Lianman, who was previously a fireman, suggested a "human ladder". Qu Yinhua removed his mountaineering shoes, and stood on Liu Lianman's shoulder to fix ice picks and safety ropes. They climbed over the Second Step at 5 p.m. Liu Lianman remained at a cave under the cliff. The others continued the ascent led by Wang Fuzhou. Oxygen ran out at 8800 m. The summit was reached at 4:20 a.m. on 25 May. The three members stayed for 15 minutes and left a 20 cm tall statue of Mao Zedong, a national flag, and a paper note.

The summitting team returned to the Advance Camp at 9 p.m., and Camp 3 on 28 May. The expedition returned to Base Camp on 30 May, where a celebratory ceremony was held on 1 June. Qu Yinhua lost all 10 toes and the right index finger to frostbite.

== Reaction ==
The nighttime summitting was not photographed. The descent was photographed. According to the team, the photos were taken at 8,700 metres (28,500 ft) at dawn but an independent analysis concluded that the photos were taken several hours later based on the angle of the sun and shadows. This cast doubt on the reliability of the official expedition report. By the time of the 1963 American expedition, no corroborating physical evidence of the ascent remained on the mountain.

Subsequent ascents corroborated the expedition report's descriptions of the Third Step and the terrain near the summit, and demonstrated the viability of ascending without oxygen. In the 1960s, Lawrence Wager concluded that the 25 May photos were taken above the Second Step by comparing them to photos from the 1933 and 1953 expeditions, although a degree of uncertainty remained due to the lack of an identifiable foreground. Jochen Hemmleb wrote that contemporary written accounts from the 1960 expedition "incorporate descriptions of topographical details of the final pyramid that could only have been obtained if the party had indeed reached the top." In addition, the expedition film Conquering the World's Highest Peak (1962) included a shot that showed detailed features of the Third Step and the summit pyramid. A study of the video determined that it had been taken above 8,700 m, demonstrating that the party had overcome the crux of the way to the summit. Western mountaineers who met with their Chinese counterparts in the 1980s found the ascent credible.

The 1960 ascent is generally accepted as true although it remains a topic of debate amongst some members of the international mountaineering community. Among those who recognize the ascent are mountaineer Eric Simonson, climbing guide author Walt Unsworth and historian Audrey Salkeld. Those who doubt the successful ascent include Conrad Anker and Reinhold Messner - in Conrad Anker's book "The Lost Explorer: Finding Mallory on Mount Everest", he remarks: "“I'm convinced—as Reinhold Messner is too—that the Chinese did not climb the Second Step in 1960. It's unfathomable to think of taking off your boots and trying the cliff in stocking feet there. It's too convenient that reaching the top in the dark explains the team's failure to bring back summit photos. And I suspect that reporting the crux of the cliff at the Second Step as only three meters high, when in truth it's a good twenty-five feet, was a concoction to make it plausible that it could have been surmounted by a shoulder stand.”
