= Rakekniven =

Mountain in Queen Maud Land, Antarctica

Coordinates: 71°54′S 7°17′E

Rakekniven Peak is a peak, 2,365 m, at the north end of Trollslottet Mountain in the Filchner Mountains, Queen Maud Land. The peak was plotted from surveys and air photos by Norwegian Antarctic Expedition (1956–60) and named Rakekniven (the razor) after its distinctive shape. It is an almost vertical granite spur protruding from the mountains, and was climbed by Alex Lowe in 1996.

== Bibliography ==
- Photo of Rakekniven in Guardian article about Alex Lowe
