= Aiguille de Triolet =

Mountain on the Mont Blanc massif

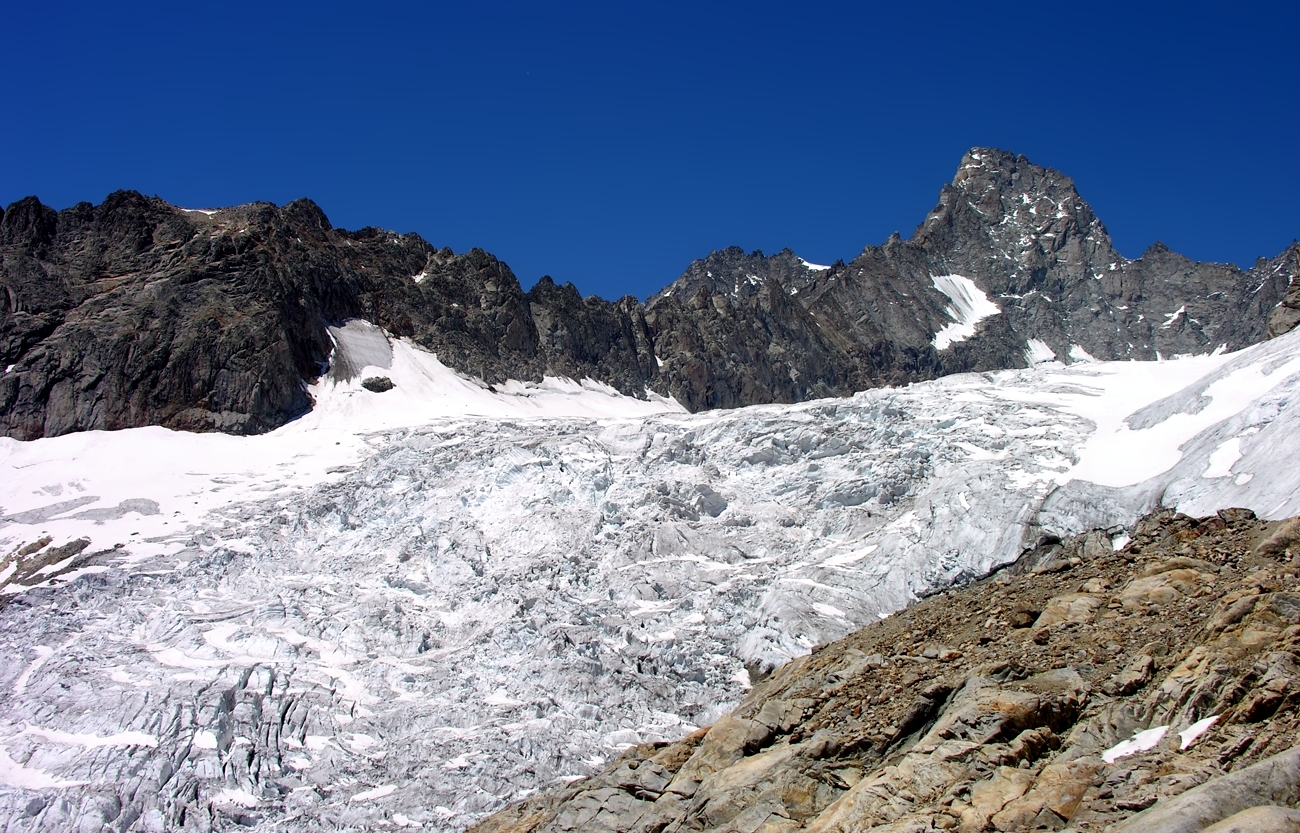
- Aiguille du Triolet from the Pré de Bar glacier

Highest point
- Elevation: 3,870 m (12,697 ft)
- Prominence: 301 m (988 ft)
- Listing: Alpine mountains above 3000 m
- Coordinates: 45°54′59″N 7°01′28″E

Geography
- Location within Alps
- Location: Haute-Savoie, France / Aosta Valley, Italy
- Parent range: Mont Blanc massif, Graian Alps

Geology
- Mountain type: Granite

Climbing
- First ascent: 26 August 1874 by J. A. G. Marshall, U. Almer and J. Fischer
- Easiest route: via the Glacier du Talefre and the Col de Triolet, PD

The Aiguille de Triolet (3,870 metres (12,697 ft)) is a mountain on the eastern part the Mont Blanc massif, on the border between France and Italy.

Located on a long ridge that includes peaks such as Mont Dolent and Grandes Jorasses, the Aiguille de Triolet lies above the Argentière Glacier and is usually climbed from this side, starting at Chamonix. Its north face is regarded as one of the classic ice climbs of the Alps.

== See also ==
- List of mountains of the Alps above 3000 m
