= Kevin Thaw =

British rock climber and mountaineer (born 1967)

Kevin Thaw (born 1967 in Uppermill, Saddleworth, West Riding of Yorkshire) is a British rock climber and mountaineer.

Thaw has climbed notable routes and added many first ascents since commencing in Britain's Peak District then relocating to California and journeying extensively through: Yosemite, El Capitan, Argentine Patagonia, the Himalaya, Alaska, Canadian Rockies, Alps, Mount Everest North side, summit June 2007.

In 2007, he joined the Altitude Everest Expedition 2007, led by renowned American climber and mountaineer, Conrad Anker, retracing the last steps of legendary British climber, George Mallory, on Everest.

== Notable ascents ==
- 1997 Continental Drift, El Capitan, Yosemite, CA, USA FA with Steve Gerberding and Conrad Anker
- 2005 Southwest Ridge, Cholatse, Khumbu region, Nepal - summit attained with Conrad Anker, Kris Erickson, John Griber and Abby Watkins on 12 May 2005.
