= Wang Fuzhou =

Chinese mountaineer

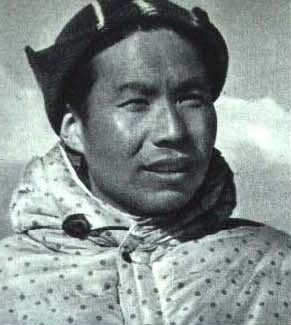
- Wang in 1964
- Born: c. 1935; Xihua County, Henan, Republic of China
- Died: 18 July 2015 (aged 80); Beijing, People's Republic of China
- Education: Beijing Institute of Geology

Wang Fuzhou (Chinese: 王富洲; pinyin: Wáng Fùzhōu; c. 1935 – 18 July 2015) was a Chinese mountaineer, born in Xihua County, Henan. He and Qu Yinhua were the first Chinese people to climb Mount Everest on the northeast ridge route.

Wang graduated from the Beijing Institute of Geology in 1958. He was elected to the Chinese Mountaineering Team. On 25 May 1960, Wang Fuzhou, Qu Yinhua and Gongbu became the first to reach the summit of Mount Everest via the north face. Wang died in Beijing on 18 July 2015.

== Notable ascents ==
- 1958 — Lenin Peak
- 1959 — Muztagh Ata
- 1960 — Mount Everest (first ascent via the northeast ridge)
- 1964 — Shishapangma (first ascent)

== See also ==
- 1960 Chinese Mount Everest expedition
