= Jimmy Chin =

American mountain climber, film director, and skier (born 1973)

- 金國威
- Chin in 2026
- Born: 1973 (age 52–53); Mankato, Minnesota, U.S.
- Education: Carleton College (BA)
- Occupations: Climber, skier, film director, photographer, and ASM speaker
- Known for: Free Solo; Meru
- Spouse: Elizabeth Chai Vasarhelyi (m. 2013; div. 2025)
- Children: 2

Jimmy Chin (born October 12, 1973) is an American professional mountain athlete, photographer, skier, film director, and author.

Chin has been a professional climber and skier on The North Face Athlete team for over 20 years. In 2006, Chin achieved the first successful American ski descent from the summit of Mount Everest with Kit and Rob DesLauriers. Five years later, Chin, Conrad Anker, and Renan Ozturk captured the first ascent of "Shark's Fin", a granite wall on India's Meru Peak.

Chin's work documenting expeditions and climbs has been featured in numerous publications, including National Geographic, The New York Times Magazine, Vanity Fair, Outside magazine and others. In 2019, Chin was awarded the National Geographic "Photographer's Photographer Award" by his peers. His first book of photography documenting his career in the mountains, There and Back, became a New York Times Best Seller in 2021.

Chin co-directs with his ex-wife Elizabeth Chai Vasarhelyi. Together they directed the documentary Meru, which won numerous awards including the Audience Award at the Sundance Film Festival and was shortlisted for an Academy Award, and Free Solo, which won an Academy Award for Best Documentary Feature, a BAFTA and seven Primetime Emmys. Free Solo had the highest-grossing opening weekend in history for a documentary. The film eventually grossed $29 million in the box office. Chin and Chai's 2021 documentary, The Rescue, chronicles the Tham Luang cave rescue. The Rescue won numerous awards, including the People's Choice Award at Toronto International Film Festival, and was also shortlisted for an Academy Award. In 2022, they released their documentary Return to Space about Elon Musk and SpaceX. Their first scripted feature Nyad, about Diana Nyad's historic swim from Cuba to Florida, starred Annette Bening and Jodie Foster and premiered in 2023.

== Climbing career ==
From 1999 to 2001, Chin organized climbing expeditions to Pakistan's Karakoram Mountains. He signed a sponsorship agreement with The North Face in 2001.

In 2002, he was asked to join a National Geographic expedition to make an unsupported crossing of the remote Chang Tang Plateau in Tibet with Galen Rowell, Rick Ridgeway and Conrad Anker. The expedition was featured in National Geographic's April 2003 issue and documented in Rick Ridgeway's book The Big Open.

In 2003, Chin headed to Everest with Stephen Koch. They attempted the direct North Face via the Japanese Couloir to the Hornbein Couloir in alpine style (eschewing supplemental oxygen, fixed ropes, and camps). They were unsuccessful and both were nearly killed in an avalanche.

In May 2004, Chin climbed Everest with David Breashears and Ed Viesturs while filming for Working Title on a feature film project with Stephen Daldry. Chin later accompanied Ed Viesturs to Annapurna in 2005. Viesturs successfully climbed Annapurna and finished his quest to climb all of the world's 8000-metre peaks without oxygen. Chin photographed the expedition and the story was featured in the September 2005 issue of Men's Journal.

In October 2006, he achieved the first successful American ski descent of Mount Everest with Kit DesLauriers and Rob DesLauriers. They skied from the summit and are the only people to have skied the South Pillar Route on the Lhotse Face.

In May 2007, Chin joined the Altitude Everest Expedition as a climber and expedition photographer in an attempt to retrace George Mallory and Sandy Irvine's fateful last journey up the North Face of Everest.

In 2007, Chin ventured to Borneo with Mark Synnott, Conrad Anker, and Alex Honnold to make the first ascent of a 2,500-foot overhanging alpine big wall at an elevation of 14,000 feet on Mount Kinabalu.

In 2008, Chin, Conrad Anker, and Renan Ozturk made their first attempt on the "Shark's Fin", a 1,500-foot blade of granite leading to the summit of 21,000-foot Meru Central, in India's Garhwal Himalaya range. They spent 19 days on the wall but were forced to turn back just 100 meters short of the summit.

In 2009, on an expedition to Chad's remote Ennedi Desert, Chin, Alex Honnold, Renan Ozturk, Mark Synott, and James Pearson made numerous first ascents of sandstone towers and arches.

Outside of major Himalayan expeditions, Chin has participated in numerous exploratory climbing and skiing expeditions to Baffin Island, Borneo, Mali, Chad, the Pitcairn Islands, Antarctica, and other remote regions of the planet.

In April 2011, Chin survived a class-4 avalanche in the Grand Tetons, his home mountain range.

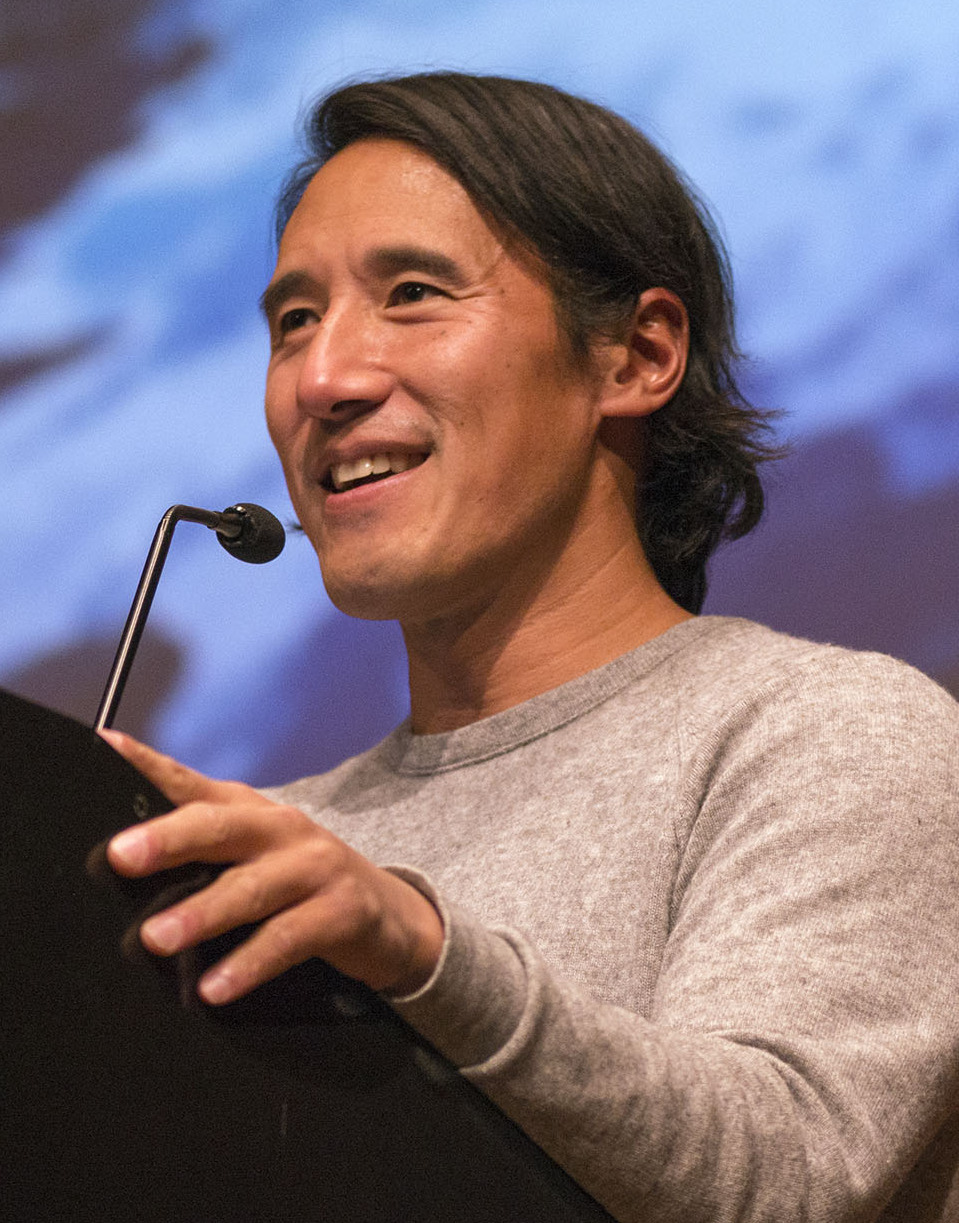
Chin in 2014

In October 2011 Chin, Conrad Anker and Renan Ozturk made the first ascent of the Shark's Fin route on Meru Central in the Garhwal Himalayas in India. They had tried the same climb in 2008, but were forced to turn around 100m from the summit. His film of the climb, Meru, was released in theaters in 2015.

In 2017, Chin and Anker established a new route on Ulvetanna Peak, called The Wolf's Fang, in Queen Maud Land, in Antarctica.

In 2020, Chin, Anker, Jim Morrison, and Hilaree Nelson climbed and skied Mount Vinson, the highest peak in Antarctica, in a one-day push. The team spent less than 48 hours at the mountain. They then attempted to climb and ski the French Route on Mount Tyree, the second-highest peak in Antarctica but turned around due to avalanche danger.

=== Expedition to find Irvine's remains ===
In 2024, exactly a century after Irvine's disappearance, an expedition led by Chin recovered a detached foot inside a boot and sock on Rongbuk Glacier. The sock was embroidered with 'A.C. Irvine' and is believed to be Andrew Irvine's. Per Chin, it is suspected the remains had melted out of the glacier about a week prior to discovery. Due to the presence of scavenging birds, Chin and his team removed the foot and turned it over to the China Tibet Mountaineering Association, the governmental agency which oversees the North Side of Mount Everest.

== Filmmaking career ==
Chin began filming in 2003 under the mentorship of Rick Ridgeway. He was a cinematographer for the National Geographic television special Deadly Fashion. He later worked with David Breashears, shooting Ed Viesturs climbing to the summit of Mount Everest. He worked as a cinematographer with Chris Malloy of Woodshed films on the feature documentary 180 South.

In 2010, Chin started the commercial production company Camp 4 Collective with Tim Kemple and Renan Ozturk. He sold the company to his partners in 2014.

Chin collaborated with his wife Elizabeth Chai Vasarhelyi to produce and direct the feature-length documentary Meru, about his 2011 climb. It premiered at the 2015 Sundance Film Festival, winning the US Audience Documentary Award.

Alex Honnold and Chin started climbing together in 2009 but it was not until 2015 that Honnold chose Chin and wife Elizabeth Chai Vasarhelyi to film his process of climbing up El Capitan.

On June 3, 2017, Chin led a team that filmed Alex Honnold on the first ever rope-free ascent of El Capitan in Yosemite National Park. Collaborating again with Vasarhelyi, they produced and directed the feature-length documentary Free Solo. Free Solo went on to win the People's Choice Award: Documentaries at the 2018 Toronto International Film Festival, the 2018 BAFTA Award for Best Documentary, and the 2018 Academy Award for Best Documentary Feature.

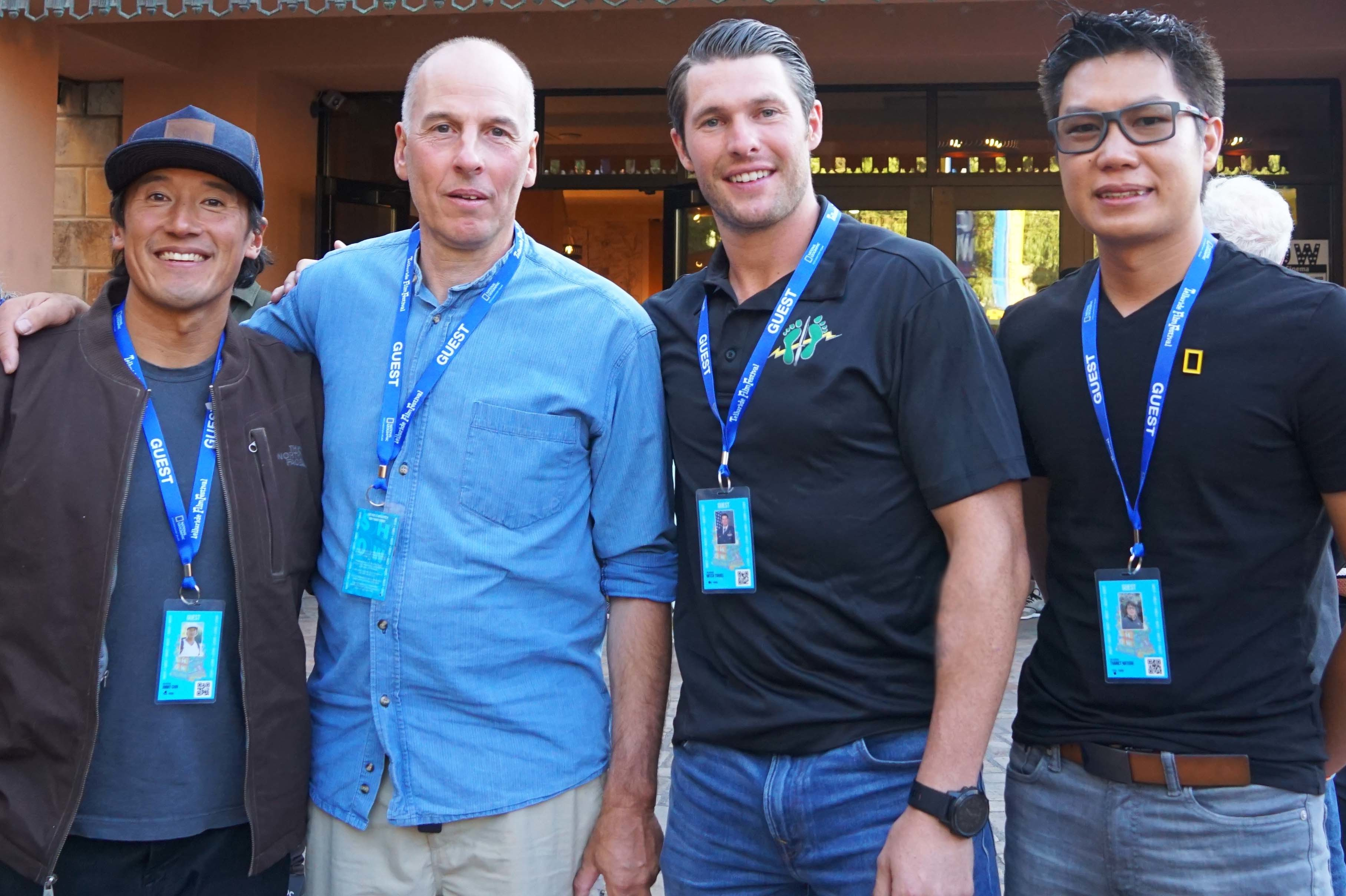
Chin (left) with Rick Stanton and other members of the Tham Luang cave rescue team at the screening of The Rescue at the Telluride Film Festival

Chin and Chai's 2021 documentary, The Rescue, chronicles the 2018 Tham Luang cave rescue, during which twelve boys belonging to an association football team and their assistant coach were rescued from inside a flooded cave in northern Thailand. The film, which premiered in select theaters in October 2021, won the People's Choice Documentary Award at the Toronto International Film Festival and received generally positive reviews.

Their 2022 documentary Return to Space centered on Elon Musk and SpaceX.

The 8-part documentary series Edge of the Unknown with Jimmy Chin premiered on Disney Plus on September 7, 2022. Chin and Chai co-directed and produced 2 episodes, while Chin was featured throughout the series.

Chin and Chai's 2023 National Geographic documentary Wild Life follows Kristine Tompkins and Doug Tompkins for decades of their love story, life of entrepreneurial and conservation work, culminating with their visionary effort to create national parks in Chile and Argentina through the largest private land donation in history.

Co-directed with Natalie Hewit, Chin and Chai's 2024 National Geographic documentary, Endurance, tells the story of Ernest Shackleton's Trans-Antarctic expedition in the 1910's and the 2022 rediscovery of his ship, which had sunk to the bottom of the Weddell Sea, by the Endurance22 mission. The film includes preserved film footage from the original expedition's photographer, Frank Hurley.

From May to June 2025, he participated in the filming of the 14-episode outdoor exploration documentary series Exploring the Unknown with Wang Yibo Season 2, initiated by Discovery Channel and Wang Yibo, where he served as a rock climbing instructor.

Chin is currently working on a National Geographic documentary on Jim Morrison, who became the first person to ski down the Hornbein Couloir on the North Face of Mount Everest in October 2025.

== Personal life ==
Jimmy was born and raised in Mankato, Minnesota, and graduated from Wayland Academy. Both his parents are from China. Jimmy's father, Frank, was born in Wenzhou to a staunchly conservative military family, and served in the Kuomintang (KMT) military under the generalissimo Chiang Kai-Shek. Following the KMT's defeat in the Chinese Civil War, Frank escaped with the KMT to Taiwan, where the party imposed White Terror on the island's residents for 45 years, between 1947-1992. Jimmy's mother was born in Harbin. His parents reportedly worked as librarians at the Minnesota State University.

Jimmy benefitted from a globetrotting childhood. He summered in Taiwan, where he enjoyed learning Mandarin, touring the island to visit his relatives, and occasionally practicing Tai Chi and Kung Fu with other Chinese migrants at the Chiang Kai-Shek memorial.

Jimmy is a 1996 alumnus of Carleton College, where he received a BA in Asian Studies. He first became involved in climbing while at Carleton. After college, he became a climbing "dirtbag", despite his parents' disapproval. Jimmy lived for seven years in a 1989 Subaru Loyale (which cost between $7995-$12,000 USD in 1989, the equivalent of around $21,400-$32,200 USD in 2026). He serendipitously discovered photography when he borrowed his sleeping climbing partner's camera to take a photo. They sold the picture for $500, and this started his photography career.

On May 26, 2013, Chin married film director and producer Elizabeth Chai Vasarhelyi; Chin and Vasarhelyi filed for divorce in 2025. As of 2015, Chin split his time between New York City and Jackson, Wyoming. Chin and Vasarhelyi have two children: Marina and James.

== Publications ==
- There and Back (2021)

== Filmography ==
=== Feature film director ===
- Nyad (2023)

=== Feature documentary producer / director ===
- Meru (2015)
- Free Solo (2018)
- The Rescue (2021)
- 14 Peaks: Nothing Is Impossible (2021)
- Return to Space (2022)
- Wild Life (2023)
- Endurance (2024)
- Love+War (2025)
- Everest: The Other Side (2026)

=== Instructor ===
- MasterClass' Jimmy Chin Teaches Adventure Photography

== Film awards and honors ==
Award/Honor	Category	Title	Result
Academy Awards	Best Documentary Feature	Free Solo	Won
Academy Awards	Best Documentary Feature	Meru	Short Listed
Academy Awards	Best Documentary Feature	The Rescue	Short Listed
Sundance Film Festival	Audience Award	Meru	Won
Primetime Creative Arts Emmy Awards	Outstanding Directing for a Documentary/Nonfiction Program	Free Solo	Won
Primetime Creative Arts Emmy Awards	Outstanding Creative Achievement in Interactive Media within an Unscripted Program	Free Solo	Won
Primetime Creative Arts Emmy Awards	Outstanding Cinematography for a Nonfiction Program	Free Solo	Won
Primetime Creative Arts Emmy Awards	Outstanding Picture Editing for a Nonfiction Program	Free Solo	Won
Primetime Creative Arts Emmy Awards	Outstanding Sound Editing for a Nonfiction Program (Single or Multi-Camera)	Free Solo	Won
Primetime Creative Arts Emmy Awards	Outstanding Sound Mixing for a Nonfiction Program (Single or Multi-Camera)	Free Solo	Won
Primetime Creative Arts Emmy Awards	Outstanding Music Composition for a Documentary Series or Special (Original Dramatic Score)	Free Solo	Won
Toronto International Film Festival	People's Choice Documentary	Free Solo	Won
Toronto International Film Festival	People's Choice Documentary	The Rescue	Won
Opening Weekend Gross	Highest Grossing Documentary Ever	Free Solo	Won
British Academy of Film and Television Arts	Best Documentary	Free Solo	Won
British Academy of Film and Television Arts	Best Documentary	The Rescue	Nominated
Producers Guild of America	Outstanding Producer of Documentary Theatrical Motion Pictures	Free Solo	Nominated
Producers Guild of America	Outstanding Producer of Documentary Theatrical Motion Pictures	The Rescue	Nominated
Directors Guild of America	Best Director for a Documentary	Free Solo	Nominated
Directors Guild of America	Best Director for a Documentary	The Rescue	Nominated
Critics Choice Awards	Best Director for a Documentary	The Rescue	Won
Critics Choice Awards	Best Score for a Documentary	The Rescue	Won
Critics Choice Awards	Best Cinematography for a Documentary	The Rescue	Won
Cinema Eye Honors Awards	Outstanding Anthology Series	Edge of the Unknown with Jimmy Chin	Nominated
Cinema Eye Honors Awards	Outstanding Achievement in Nonfiction Feature Filmmaking	The Rescue	Nominated
Cinema Eye Honors Awards	Outstanding Achievement in Cinematography	Meru	Won
Cinema Eye Honors Awards	Outstanding Achievement in Cinematography	Free Solo	Won
Cinema Eye Honors Awards	Outstanding Achievement in Production	Meru	Nominated
Cinema Eye Honors Awards	Outstanding Achievement in Production	Free Solo	Won
Cinema Eye Honors Awards	Outstanding Achievement in Production	The Rescue	Nominated
Cinema Eye Honors Awards	Audience Choice Prize	Meru	Won
Cinema Eye Honors Awards	Audience Choice Prize	Free Solo	Won
Cinema Eye Honors Awards	Audience Choice Prize	The Rescue	Won

== Awards ==
- Navy SEAL Foundation Fire in the Gut Award (2024)
- Nominee Piolet D'Or International Climbing award
- Outside Magazine's Adventurers of the Year 2012
- American Society of Magazine Editors (ASME) Sports and Adventure Winner
- Society of American Travel Writers (SATW) Foundation's Award
- National Geographic and Microsoft Emerging Explorers Grant
- Galen Rowell Memorial Photography Award
- Lyman Spitzer Adventure Award: K7 Climbing Expedition
- Polartec Grant Recipient: K7 Climbing Expedition
- Honorary Doctorate, Sustainability Science, Unity College, Unity, Maine
- Carleton College Alumni Award for Distinguished Achievement
- National Geographic Photographer's Photographer Award (2020)
- National Geographic Further Award (2020)
- Murie Spirit of Conversation Award (2019)
- Audience Award at Sundance Film Festival for Meru (2015)
- Academy Award for Best Documentary Feature for Free Solo (2018)
- GQ Man of the Year (2021)
- Ken Burn's American Heritage Prize (2022)

== See also ==
- List of Mount Everest summiters by number of times to the summit
