= Three Steps =

Rock formations near the summit of Mount Everest

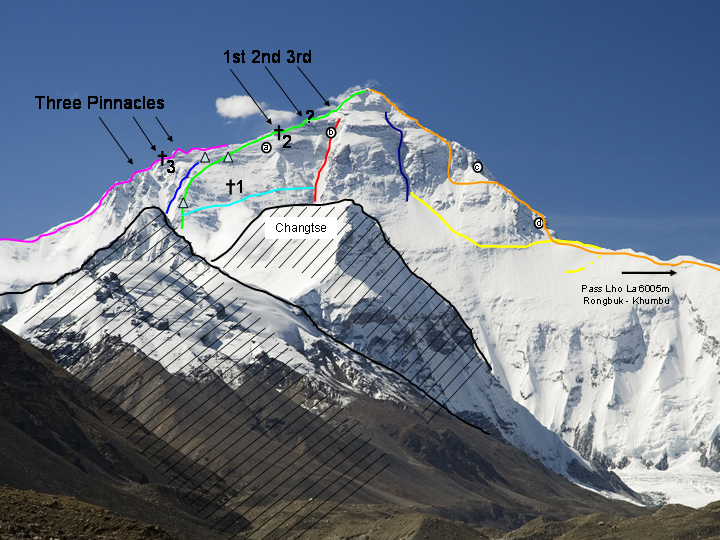
North Face of Mount Everest. "1st", "2nd", and "3rd" indicate the Three Steps.

The Three Steps are three prominent rocky steps on the northeast ridge of Mount Everest. They are located at altitudes of 8,564 metres (28,097 ft), 8,610 metres (28,250 ft), and 8,710 metres (28,580 ft). Any climber who wants to climb on the normal route from the north of the summit must negotiate these three steps.

== First Step ==
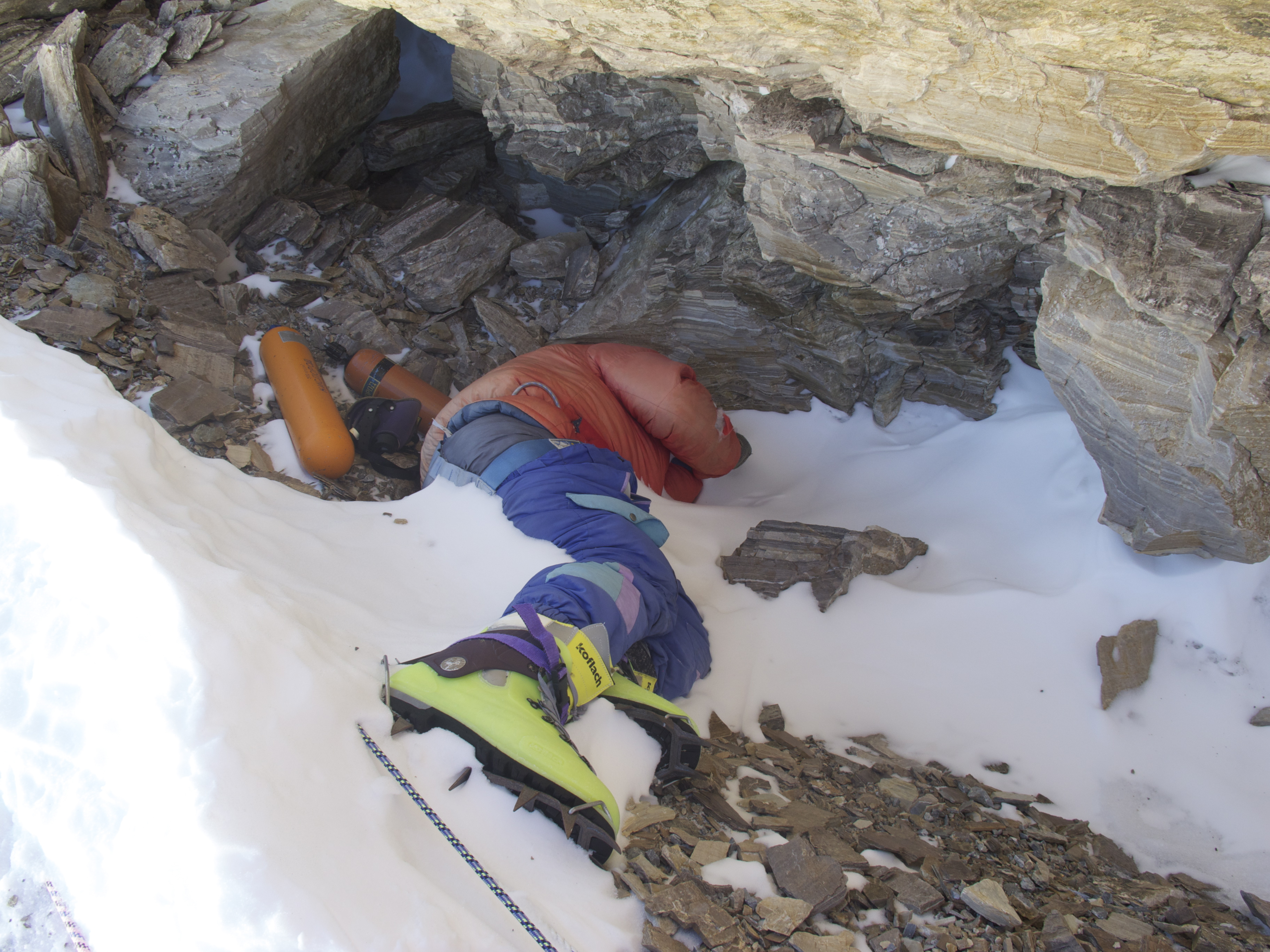
Photo of Green Boots, the corpse of an Indian climber that became a landmark on the main northeast ridge route of Mount Everest

The First Step consists of large boulders that pose a serious obstacle because of their location high in the Death Zone. Many mountaineers have died near the First Step, among them "Green Boots", a corpse wearing neon green climbing boots and a red coat, which until 2014 was a sombre landmark for climbers to gauge their distance to the top, and which has now been identified as Dorje Morup. Other climbers known to have died near the First Step are Tsewang Smanla and Tsewang Paljor, who died on the same day as Green Boots, and David Sharp.

== Second Step ==
The Second Step is a steep section at an altitude of 8,610 m with a climbing height of 40 metres (130 ft), of which the last five are almost vertical. The step may have been climbed for the first time in 1960 when Wang Fuzhou, Gongbu, and Qu Yinhua claimed to have completed the first ascent via the north ridge, with their teammate Liu Lianman volunteering to be a human ladder up the step. Despite being widely accepted, there is inconclusive evidence to support the claim. The climbing difficulty of this spot was reduced in 1975 when a Chinese team fixed an aluminium ladder to the step that has been used since then by almost all climbers. In 2007, out of safety considerations, the original 15 feet (4.6 m) ladder was replaced with a new one by Chinese and international mountaineers. The original ladder is now on display at the Mount Qomolangma Museum in Tibet.

The 1921 British Mount Everest reconnaissance expedition was the first to attempt to climb Mount Everest. It was followed by further British expeditions in 1922, 1924, and 1933. The climbers had to make the ascent from the north, since Nepal was closed. The situation became reversed after the communist victory in the Battle of Chamdo; expeditions launched after that had to use the southern approach through Nepal. The technical difficulties, especially in climbing the Second Step, were still unknown. There is ongoing discussion as to whether the Second Step was ever surmounted by George Mallory and Andrew Irvine in 1924. It was surmounted in 1960 as part of the first ascent of Mount Everest via the north route, when a shoulder stand was used to climb the last 5 metres (16 ft).

The step was first climbed unaided in 1985, by the Spanish Òscar Cadiach. He assessed the final rock face as 5.7 to 5.8 (V+ in UIAA classification). Theo Fritsche, an Austrian, climbed the step in 2001 free solo on-sight and came to a similar conclusion. Conrad Anker climbed the Second Step in 1999 and assessed the level of difficulty as 5.10. On this ascent Anker supported himself using the Chinese ladder. In 2007, Anker repeated the climb with Leo Houlding; this time, however, he first removed the ladder in order to climb the step unaided.

== Third Step ==
The Third Step is easiest to climb. Its climbing height is about 10 metres (33 ft), after which the summit snowfield is reached.

== Sources ==
- Mantovani, Roberto and Diemberger, Kurt (1997). Mount Everest – Kampf in eisigen Höhen. Moewig. ISBN 3-8118-1715-9
- Hemmleb, Jochen (2009). Tatort Mount Everest: Der Fall Mallory – Neue Fakten und Hintergründe. Herbig, Munich. ISBN 978-3-7243-1022-8.

== See also ==
- Hillary Step
