= Gongbu (mountaineer) =

Chinese mountaineer (1933–2024)

- Born: Gonpo Dorje; 1933; Surco Shika, Ngamring Dzong, Tibet (present day Surco Township, Nyalam County, Tibet, China)
- Died: 8 December 2024 (aged 90–91); Chengdu, Sichuan, China
- Occupation: mountain climber
- Known for: One of the first three Chinese to summit Mount Everest

Gongbu (Chinese: 贡布; pinyin: Gòngbù; 1933 – 8 December 2024), also known as Konbu, Gonbu, or Gonpa, born Gonpo Dorje (Tibetan: མགོན་པོ་རྡོ་རྗེ, Wylie: mgon po rdo rje), was a Chinese mountaineer who was the eighth person and first Tibetan to summit Mount Everest.

== Early life and climbing ==
Gongbu was born in 1933. He joined the People's Liberation Army in 1956, and then a mountaineering team in 1958, consisting of both Chinese and Soviet mountaineers. For the next two years, the Chinese government planned a climb of Everest: Gongbu was assigned to logistics and road-building. One Chinese team failed to summit after reaching 8,300 metres (27,200 ft), Gongbu was assigned to the next team.

Finally, in May 1960, the Chinese team with Gongbu managed to perform the first climb of Everest from the north side. Prior expeditions had turned back at the Second Step, but Gongbu's team used technical methods to overcome the challenge.

After the climb, Gongbu met Mao Zedong, and became a deputy director of the Sports Commission of Tibet.

== Personal life and death ==
Gongbu was married to Bai Ma (白玛). He died on 8 December 2024, at the age of 91.
