= Climbing equipment =

Manufactured gear used in climbing

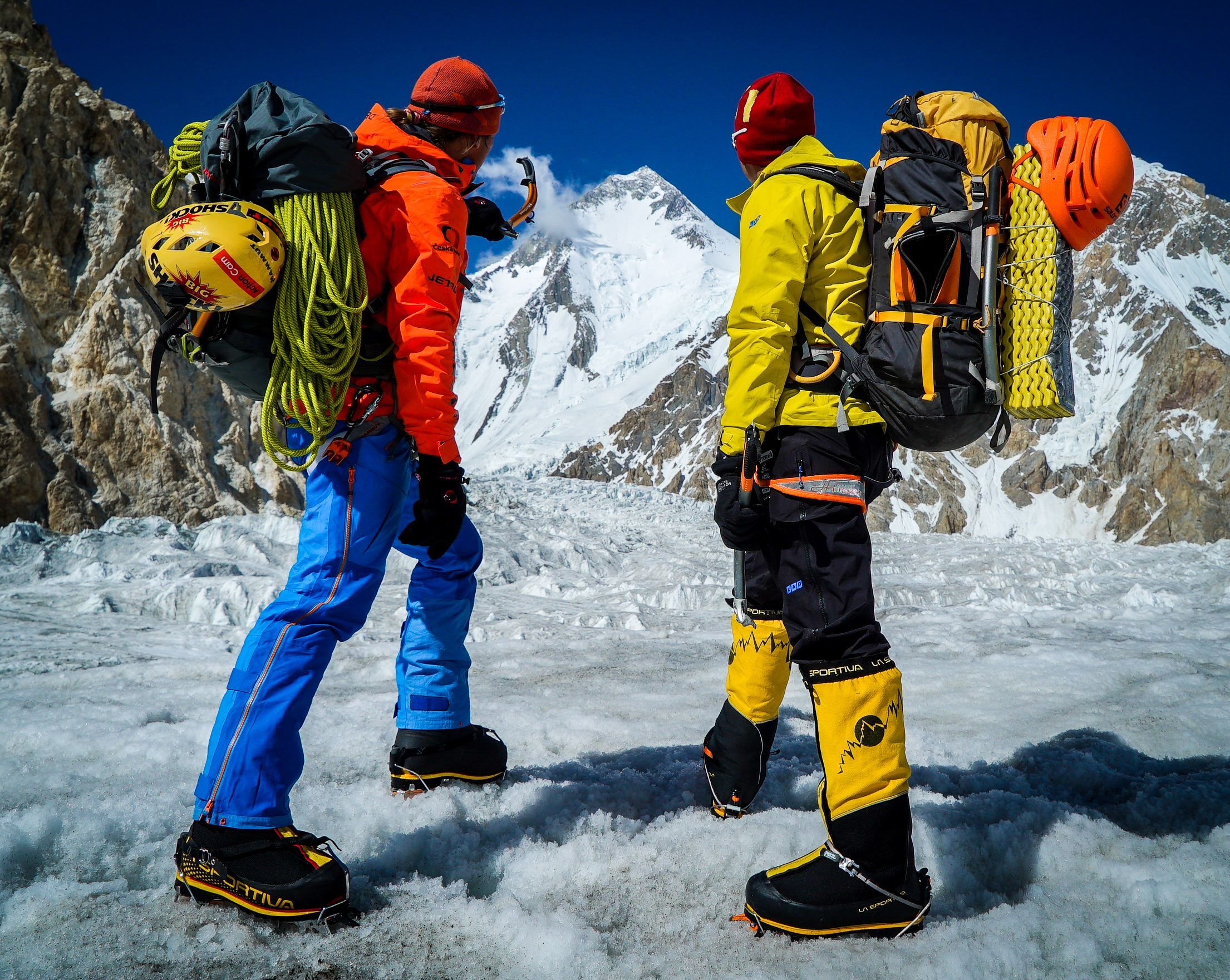
Climbers with the full equipment for an alpine style ascent of Gasherbrum I

Climbing equipment refers to a broad range of manufactured gear that is used in the activity or sport of climbing.

Notable groups include:

- Alpine climbing equipment as is used in alpine climbing and mountaineering
- Deep-water soloing equipment as is used in deep-water soloing
- Ice climbing equipment as is used in ice climbing and in mixed climbing
- Mixed climbing equipment as used in mixed climbing and in dry-tooling
- Mountaineering equipment as is used in mountaineering and in alpine climbing
- Rock-climbing equipment as is used in aid climbing, bouldering, competition climbing, free solo climbing, multi-pitch climbing (big wall climbing), rope solo climbing, sport climbing, traditional climbing and top rope climbing
- Rope team equipment as used in glacier travel
- Via Ferrata equipment as used in Via Ferrata climbing

== See also ==
- List of climbing and mountaineering equipment brands
- Climbing technique, directly influenced by the standard of climbing equipment
