= Glacier travel =

Walking over mountain glaciers

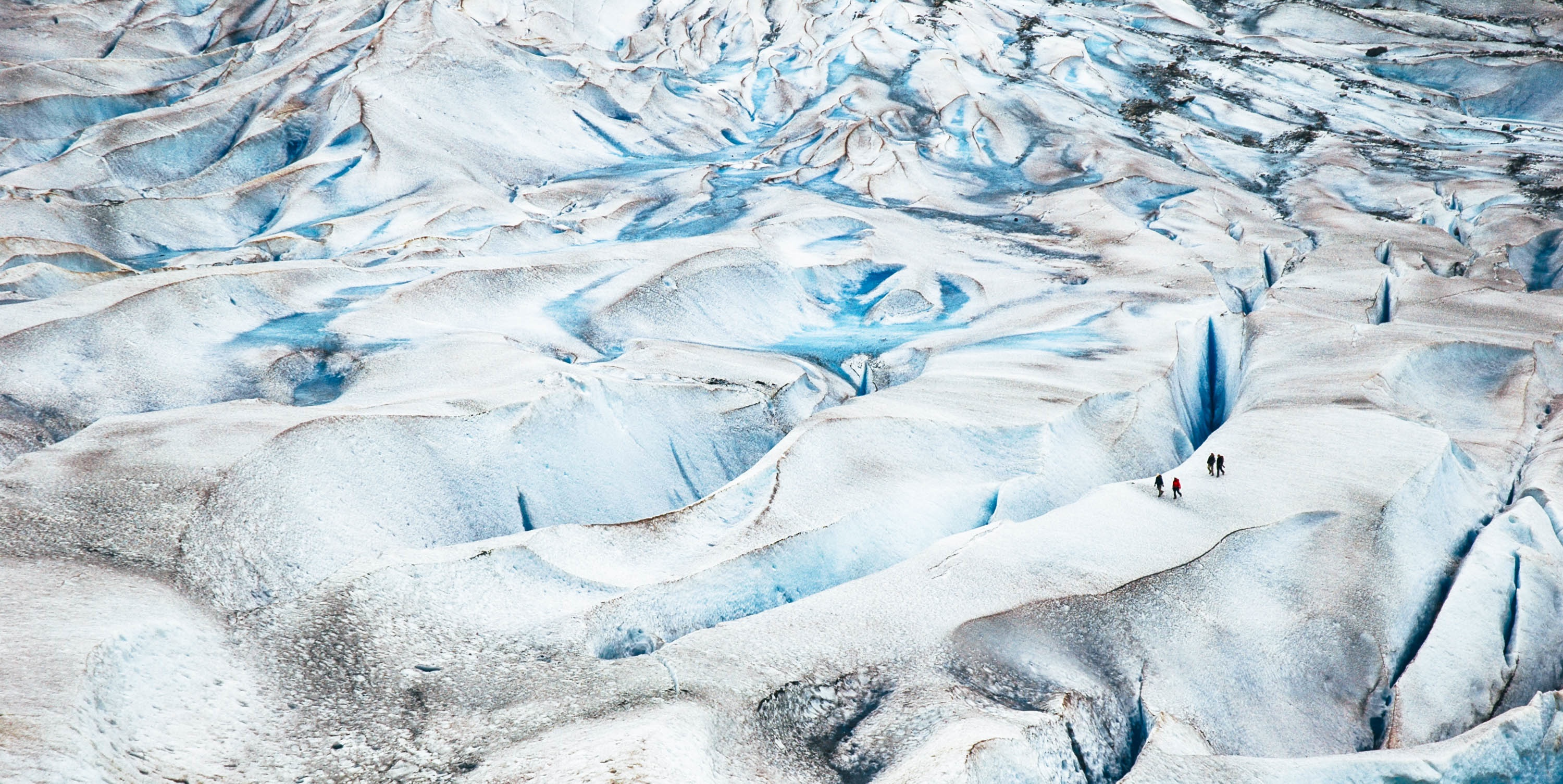
People hiking on the Mendenhall Glacier in Juneau, Alaska

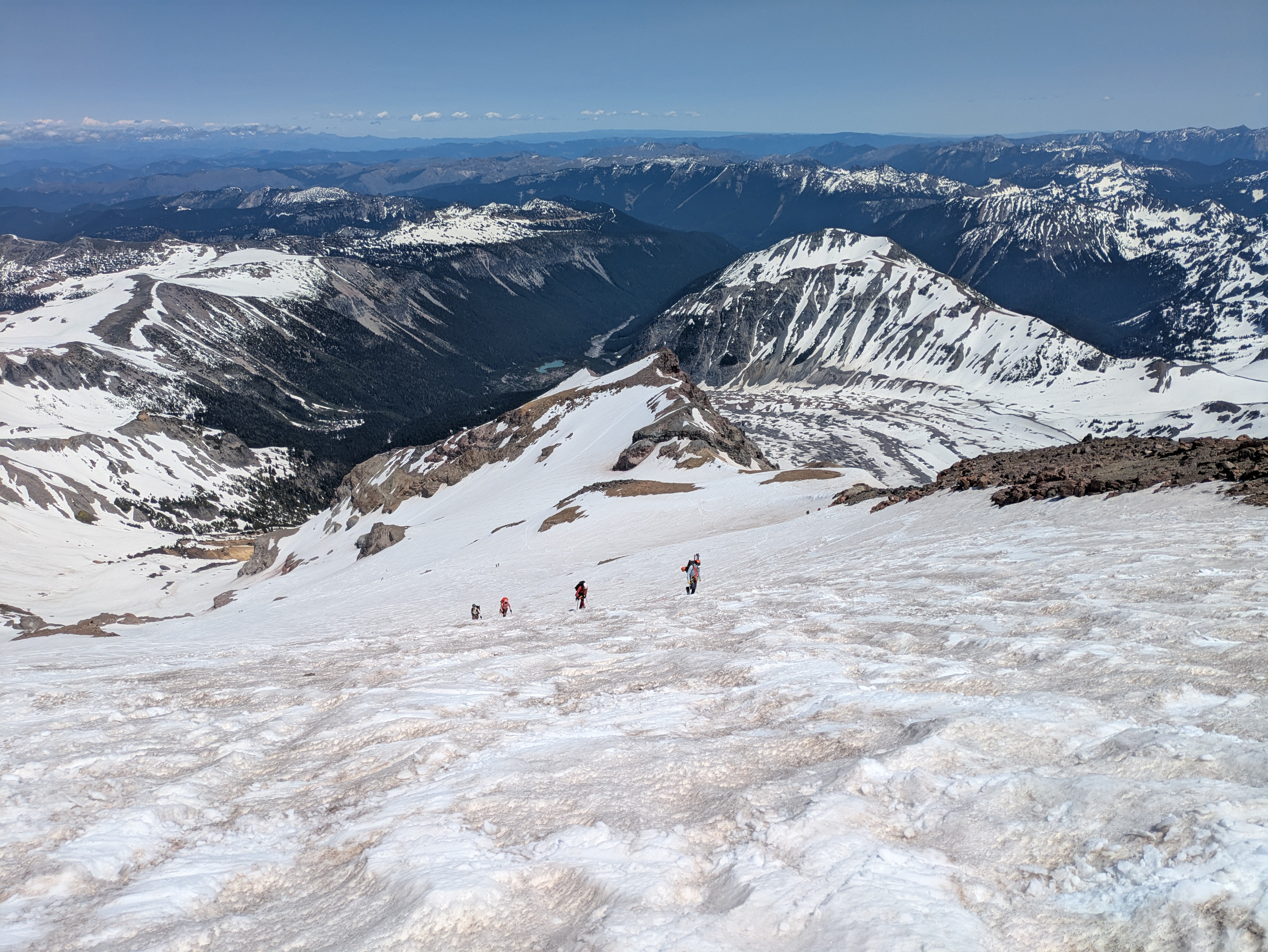
Rope team ascending the Inter Glacier just below Steamboat Prow on Mount Rainier. All other parties were unroped as crevasse danger was low for this glacier in late spring.

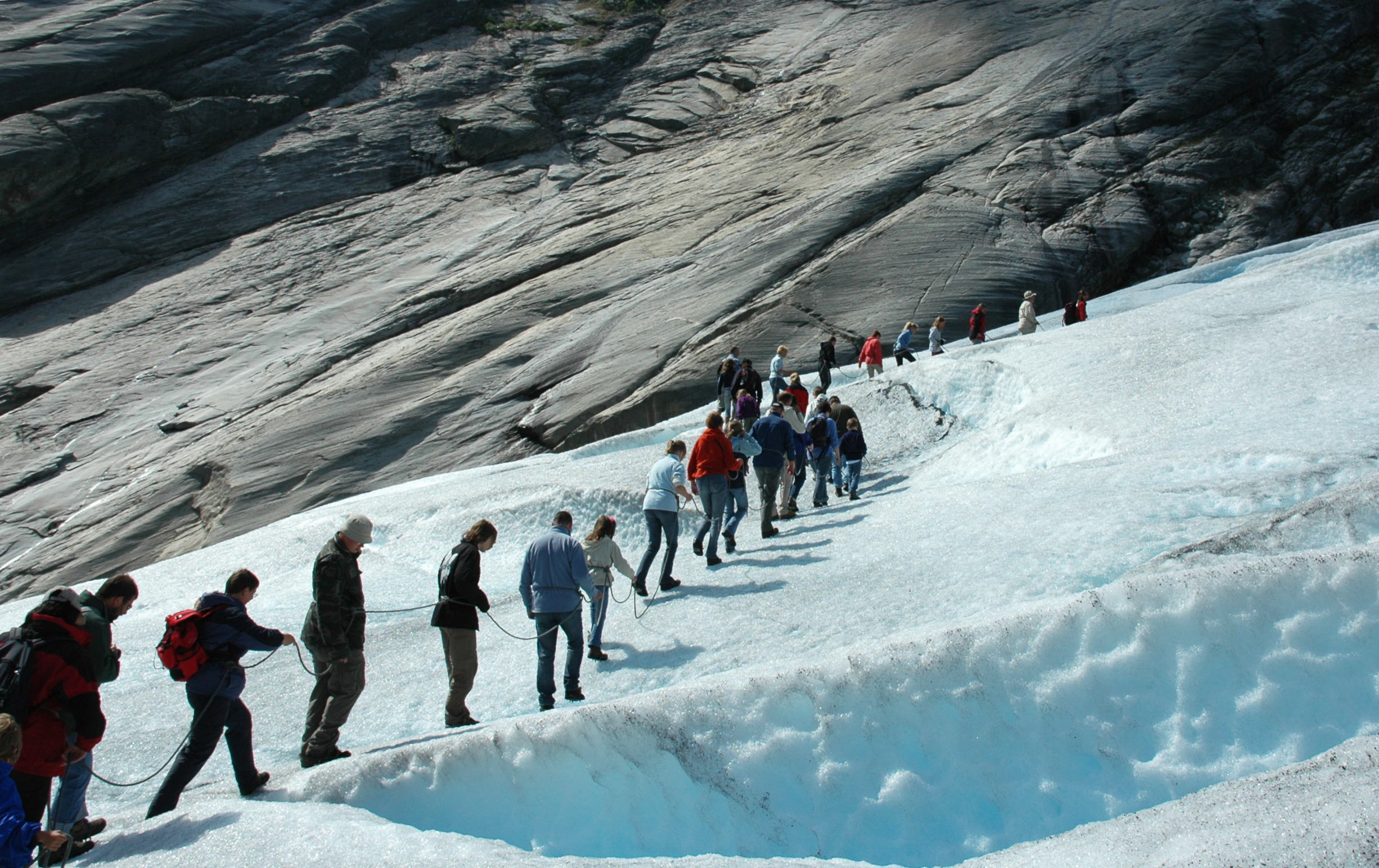
Tourists hiking Nigardsbreen in Norway as a large rope team.

Glacier travel involves traversing (often as a rope team), skiing, or even ice climbing on a glacier using various pieces of special equipment, such as crampons, climbing ropes, climbing harness, helmets and ice axes. Falling into a crevasse is a hazard on many glaciers and may require a specialised crevasse rescue.

Glaciers are found on every continent except for Australia. They need a specific climate: generally a lot of snowfall during the winter and relatively cool temperatures during the summer. The activity of "glacier hiking" is a tourist attraction in some countries, but it requires special knowledge of the constantly-changing environments on glaciers to avoid life-threathening hazards such as crevasses and seracs.

Crossing glaciers—often in pitch-black darkness with headtorches before sunrise—to get to the start of a climbing route is a typical feature of alpine climbing.

== Notable destinations ==
All continents, with the exception of Australia, have glacier hiking destinations. Some of these destinations are easily accessible, while others are more enjoyable at certain times of the year. Each glacier hiking excursion features at least one, if not more, different paid services to help with guided tours and different sightseeing experiences.

North America

- Alaska features a variety of different glaciers that people enjoy visiting and hiking. These glaciers are enjoyed especially during the summer months, as Alaska’s temperatures are always cold.
- Montana is the home to the Glacier National Park, which features over 50 glaciers on its 734-mile long trail. The trail includes other climbing and sightseeing activities as well.

South America

- Argentina has the Perito Moreno Glacier. This glacier is easily accessible, and so it is very popular. It is 185 m above sea level. The glacier itself has remained stable since 1917.

Europe

- Switzerland has the Great Aletsch Glacier, which is located on a hiking path that includes lakes and other mountain paths. The glacier itself features 32 peaks that are 4,000 meters high.
- Iceland is home to Svínafellsjökull, a small extension of Vatnajökull near Skaftafell and a very popular glacier for hiking. It is one of the oldest and bluest glaciers in Iceland. Near Jökulsárlón (Glacier Lagoon) is the Breiðamerkurjökull glacier, which is one of the most popular ones in the country. In the winter season, it features caves that are a great tourist attraction.

Africa

- Located in Tanzania, Mount Kilimanjaro features glaciers that you can view while hiking up the mountain. These glaciers are unstable; the ice is melting and therefore, the structure is not safe to climb.

Oceania

- Although Australia has no glaciers, New Zealand does: Fox Glacier and Franz Josef Glacier can be hiked. The glaciers lead into a neighboring rainforest. Hikers must use helicopters to reach these glaciers.

== See also ==
- Alpine climbing
- Rope teams
- Simul climbing
