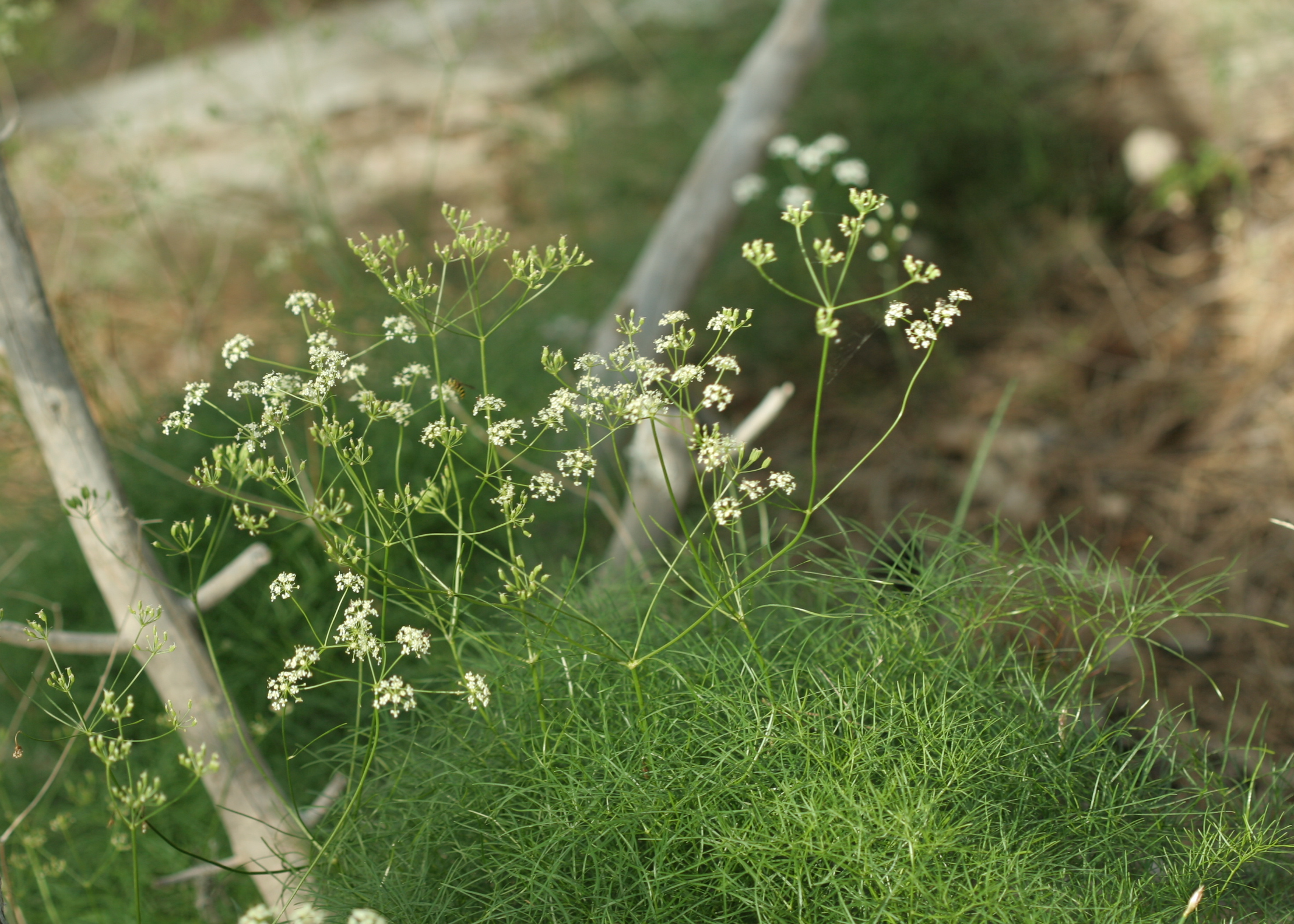
- Rivasmartinezia cazorlana

Scientific classification
- Kingdom: Plantae
- Clade: Tracheophytes
- Clade: Angiosperms
- Clade: Eudicots
- Clade: Asterids
- Order: Apiales
- Family: Apiaceae
- Genus: Rivasmartinezia; Fern.Prieto & Cires

= Rivasmartinezia =

Genus of flowering plants

Rivasmartinezia is a genus of flowering plants belonging to the family Apiaceae.

Its native range is Spain.

The genus name of Rivasmartinezia is in honour of Salvador Rivas Martínez (1935–2020), who was a Spanish Biologist, Apothecary, Botanist (Mycology, Lichenology, Pteridology), also mountaineer and Alpinist. He was also Director of the Botanical Garden in Madrid.

The genus was circumscribed by José Antonio Fernández Prieto and Eduardo Cires Rodríguez in Pl. Biosystems vol.148 (Issue 5-6) on page 982 in 2014 (epublished).

Species:

- Rivasmartinezia cazorlana Blanca, Cueto, Benavente & J.Fuentes
- Rivasmartinezia vazquezii Fern.Prieto & Cires
