= Simul-climbing =

Technique used in climbing

Examples of simul-climbing

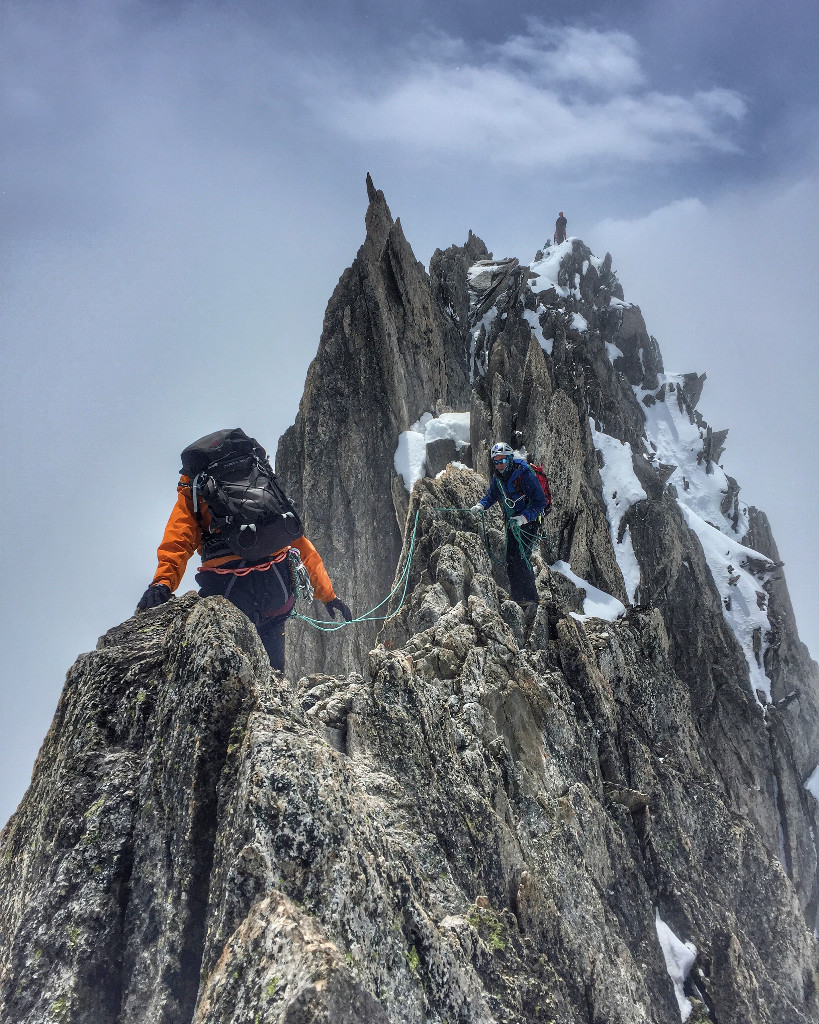
Traversing the Aiguilles d'Entrèves (AD 4c)

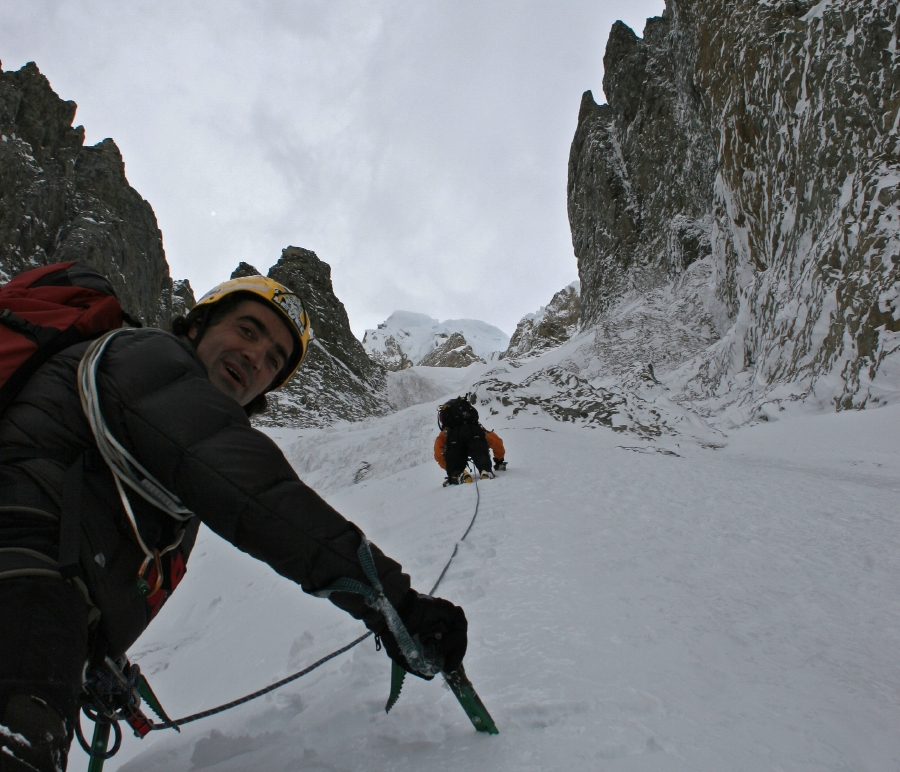
Ice climbing up a couloir on the north face of Monte San Lorenzo

Simul-climbing (or using a running-belay) is a climbing technique where a pair of climbers who are attached by a rope simultaneously ascend a multi-pitch climbing route. It contrasts with lead climbing where the leader ascends a given pitch on the route while the second climber remains in a fixed position to belay the leader in case they fall. Simul-climbing is not free solo climbing, as the lead simul-climber will clip the rope into points of climbing protection as they ascend. Simul-climbing is different from a rope team (which can involve larger groups) and short-roping (used by guides with their clients), which are used for flatter terrain that does not typically need protection points.

Simul-climbing is an advanced and potentially dangerous technique. A fall by either climber is serious, and a 2019 article in Outside said "That's why there's a simple rule of simul-climbing: don't fall." In simul-climbing, the strongest climber goes second. Contemporary simul-climbers use progress capture devices (PCDs) at some of the protection points so that if the following climber falls, the PCD will lock the rope holding the falling climber and preventing the leader from being pulled off. While PCDs can control the consequences of a fall, no manufacturer of PCDs recommends their use for simul-climbing, and the falls from simul-climbing can place greater forces and stresses on the rope and/or the PCD than they were made to handle. The second climber will also use an assisted braking device as a belay device which will auto-lock in the event of a leader fall.

Simul-climbing is most commonly used by experienced alpinists on very long alpine climbing routes so they can move quickly on terrain that both climbers are very comfortable with, but which is sufficiently exposed to require protection. Examples are long sharp alpine ridges or aretes or easier-angled rock slabs and couloirs (see images). Alex Honnold and Tommy Caldwell considered their ability to simul-climb grade 5.10 rock climbing routes as critical to their award winning traverse of Cerro Chaltén Group in 2014. Simul-climbing has also been used in setting speed climbing records on big wall climbing routes such as on The Nose on El Capitan. Speed simul-climbers can reduce the climbing time by three quarters by using fewer points of climbing protection (known as "running-out"), but this has led to fatalities, and concerns about the danger of the technique. A safer alternative to simul-climbing for steep big wall routes is the technique of short-fixing, where the leader effectively sets up a fixed rope for the second climber to ascend while the leader simultaneously continues up the next pitch using a rope solo climbing technique.

== See also ==
- Rope solo climbing
- Rope team
