= Traverse (climbing) =

Section of a climbing route

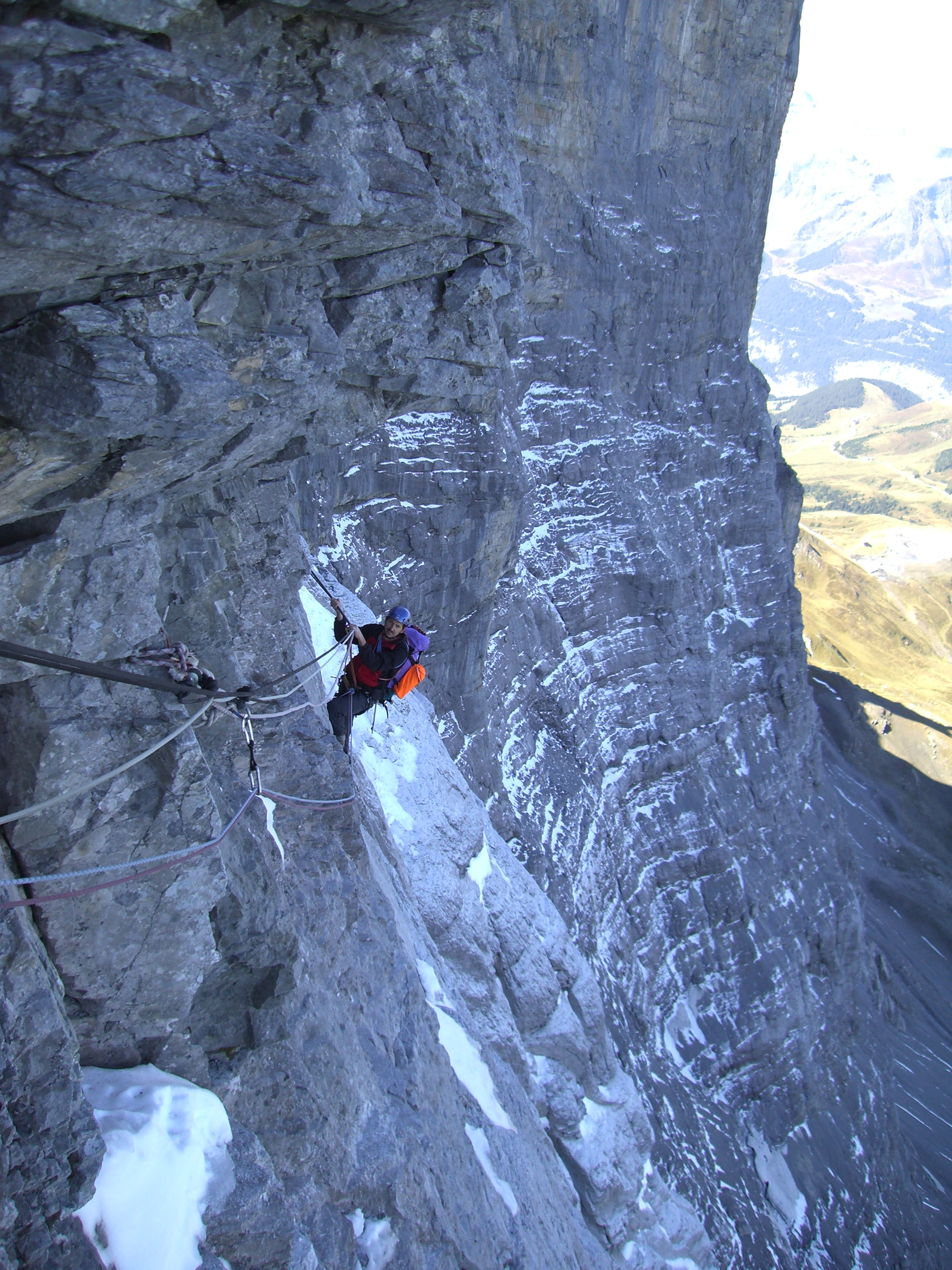
Alpinist crossing the famous Hinterstoisser traverse on the Eiger north face, 1938 Heckmair Route

In climbing and mountaineering, a traverse is a section of a climbing route where the climber moves laterally (or horizontally), as opposed to in an upward direction. The term has broad application, and its use ranges from describing a brief section of lateral movement on a pitch of a route, to large multi-pitch climbing routes that almost entirely consist of lateral movement such as girdle traverses that span the entire rock face of a crag, or mountain traverses that span entire ridges connecting chains of mountain peaks.

Long traverses in rock climbing and alpine climbing may require special climbing techniques (e.g. a pendulum or a tension traverse), and pieces of climbing equipment (e.g. ascenders) to manage the risks of the lead climber and/or the following (or 'second') climber falling far off the route. Long traverses place increased pressure on the abilities of the following climber than on a normal climb. Traversing is a regular feature in bouldering, and is also a popular rock-climbing training technique on indoor climbing walls.

Notable traverses include the 4,500-metre El Capitan Girdle Traverse on El Capitan, the world's longest rock route; (Note: The world's largest vertical climbing route is considered to be the big wall climbing route, The Grande Voyage (1,340 metres, VII 5.10 A4+ WI3), which is on the Great Trango Tower in the Himalayas.) the Hinterstoisser traverse on the Eiger, which was the key to the famous 1938 Heckmair Route; and the Fitz Roy traverses (both directions) of the Cerro Chaltén Group, which are considered some of the hardest 'mountain traverses' ever completed. Climbers consider the 'Everest-Lhotse traverse', and the even harder 'Everest-Lhotse-Nuptse traverse', as some of the unfinished "holy grails" of mountaineering.

== In rock climbing ==
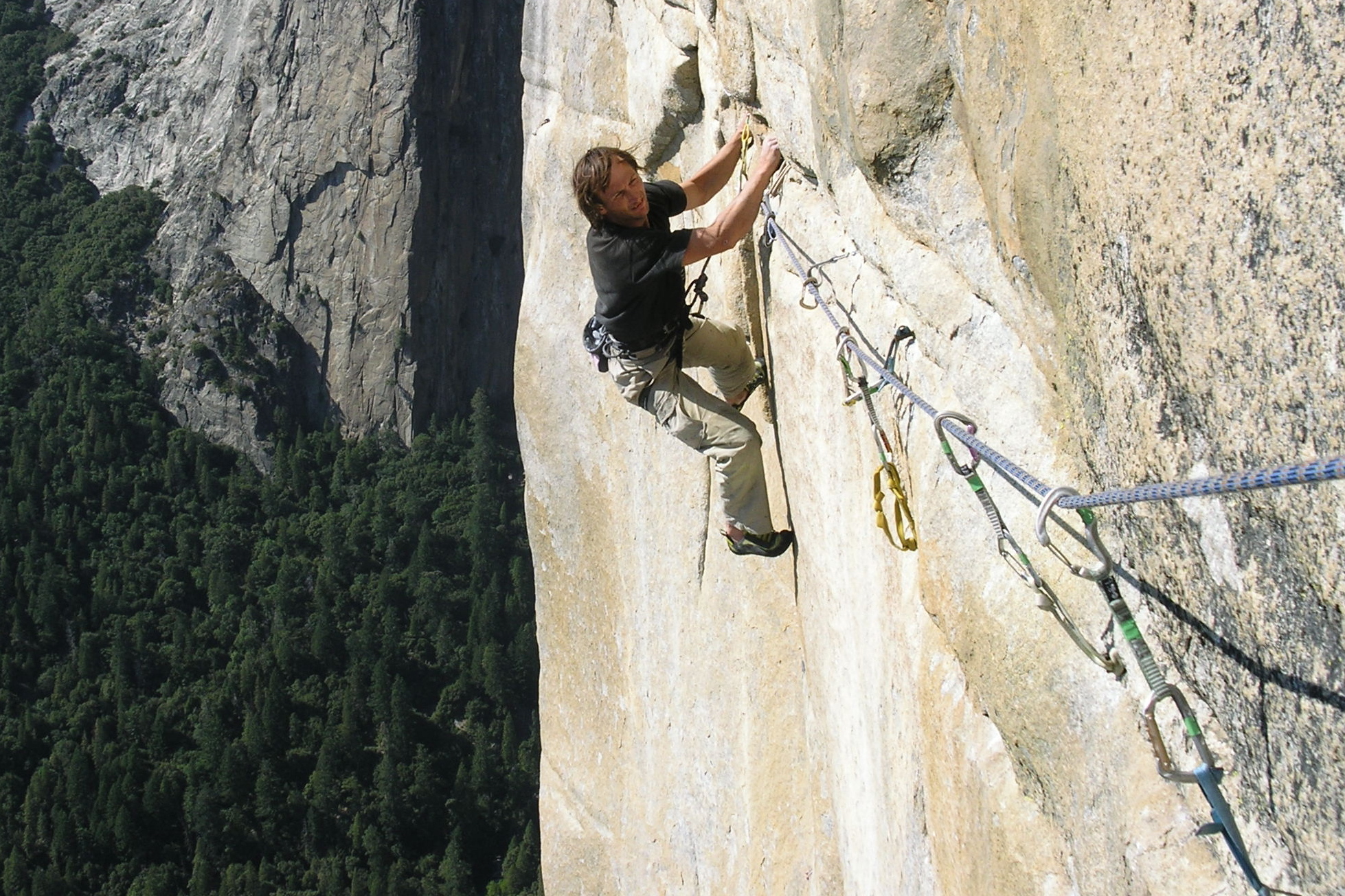
The 'following climber' negotiates a traverse section on El Capitan.

=== Description ===
In rock climbing, a traverse is a section of the route that moves horizontally for a period. There are many reasons for the need to have a traverse on a route including side-stepping challenges whose grade is too hard (e.g. a major roof or a very 'blank' section of rock), or trying to follow a crack climbing route where a set of cracks run out and the climbers must move horizontally to find the next set of cracks to continue upward.

A traverse stands in direct contrast to a 'direttissima' (sometimes also called a 'direct'), which is a route that dispenses with any existing traverses, and instead rises vertically upward in the straightest possible line from the bottom to the top. Famous examples include the 1958 creation of the Hasse-Brandler Direttissima on the north face of the Cima Grande on the Tre Cime di Lavaredo in the Dolomites.

Rock-climbing routes with traverses can be found at most climbing areas and some are famous for their 'girdle traverse', which are very long traverse routes that horizontally span the entire rock climbing area or crag. Notable girdle traverses include The Great Wall of China (3,000 metres, 67-pitches, 5.9 R) on the Shawangunks in New York State, the Stanage Traverse (circa 5,000 metres but broken up in places, E5 6b) at Stanage Edge in England, and the El Capitan Girdle Traverse (4,500 metres, 75-pitches, 5.10 A4) on El Capitan in Yosemite, which was the world's largest continuous climbing pitch as of 2024 according to Guinness World Records.

=== Techniques and equipment ===
Traversing emphasizes specific rock-climbing techniques such as 'crimping', 'side-pulls', 'laybacking', 'stemming', and 'cross-throughs' (in which the limbs are crossed so the moves are longer and fluid). Long traverses require specific pieces of equipment and protection to handle any accidental falls, as a falling climber may fall to a place that is so 'off-route' that it is impossible to climb back up. In such cases, they will have to use mechanical ascenders to jumar back up to rope and get back 'on-route'. When pairs are lead climbing, traversing requires the following climber (or 'second') to also have strong technical abilities, since, in contrast to normal lead climbing, they will not be on the safety of a top rope when they are being belayed by the lead climber. The lead climber will insert protection equipment both before and after a difficult (or crux) move on a traverse to allow the following climber to remove the first piece of protection before making the difficult move. This will reduce the distance that they will fall in the event that they fail to overcome the difficult move.

On some big wall climbing traverses, such as King Swing on The Nose on El Capitan, the traverse cannot be climbed and is instead crossed using specific 'pendulum' or a 'tension traverse' rope-techniques. In a 'pendulum', the 'lead climber' is lowered down from a fixed anchor point, from where they swing back and forward in the manner of a pendulum. When the swing distance is sufficiently great, they can grab onto new holds that would have been unreachable without the pendulum. Once secured on these new holds, they then help their 'second' to pendulum to their new position. In a 'tension traverse', the lead climber sets up in the same manner as with a pendulum, but the face is sufficiently sloped that they can't (or don't need to) swing freely. They instead climb along the rock using the tension in the anchored rope to take some of their weight, thus making the climb easier.

=== In bouldering ===
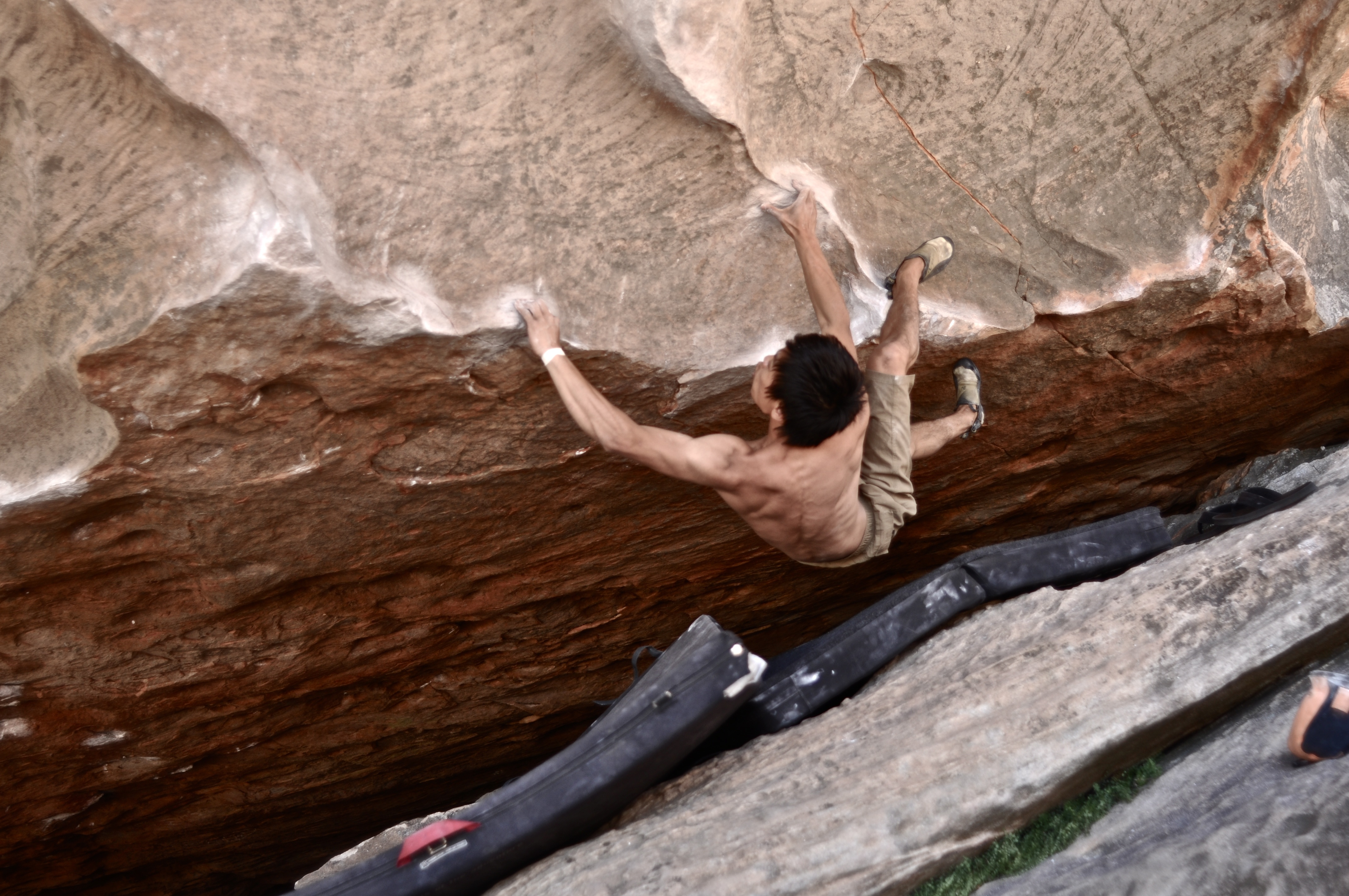
Climber on Rave Heart traverse of The Wheel of Life 8C (V15) boulder

Traversing is an even more regular feature of bouldering, where there is less focus on moving exclusively upwards and many bouldering routes will involve a quasi-traverse of diagonal upward movements (e.g. Dreamtime), or at the more extreme end, traverses across a low roof (e.g. The Wheel of Life). Long boulder traverses have been described as a "distinct sub-discipline in climbing", and in the famous Fontainebleau bouldering area, specific amendments are made to the Font grade to allow for the increased stamina requirements of traverses (e.g. while a bouldering Font 9A is equivalent to an American V grade of V17, a long boulder traverse of 9A may only have the technical challenge of an American V13 grade).

== In mountaineering ==
Traverses on alpine climbing routes

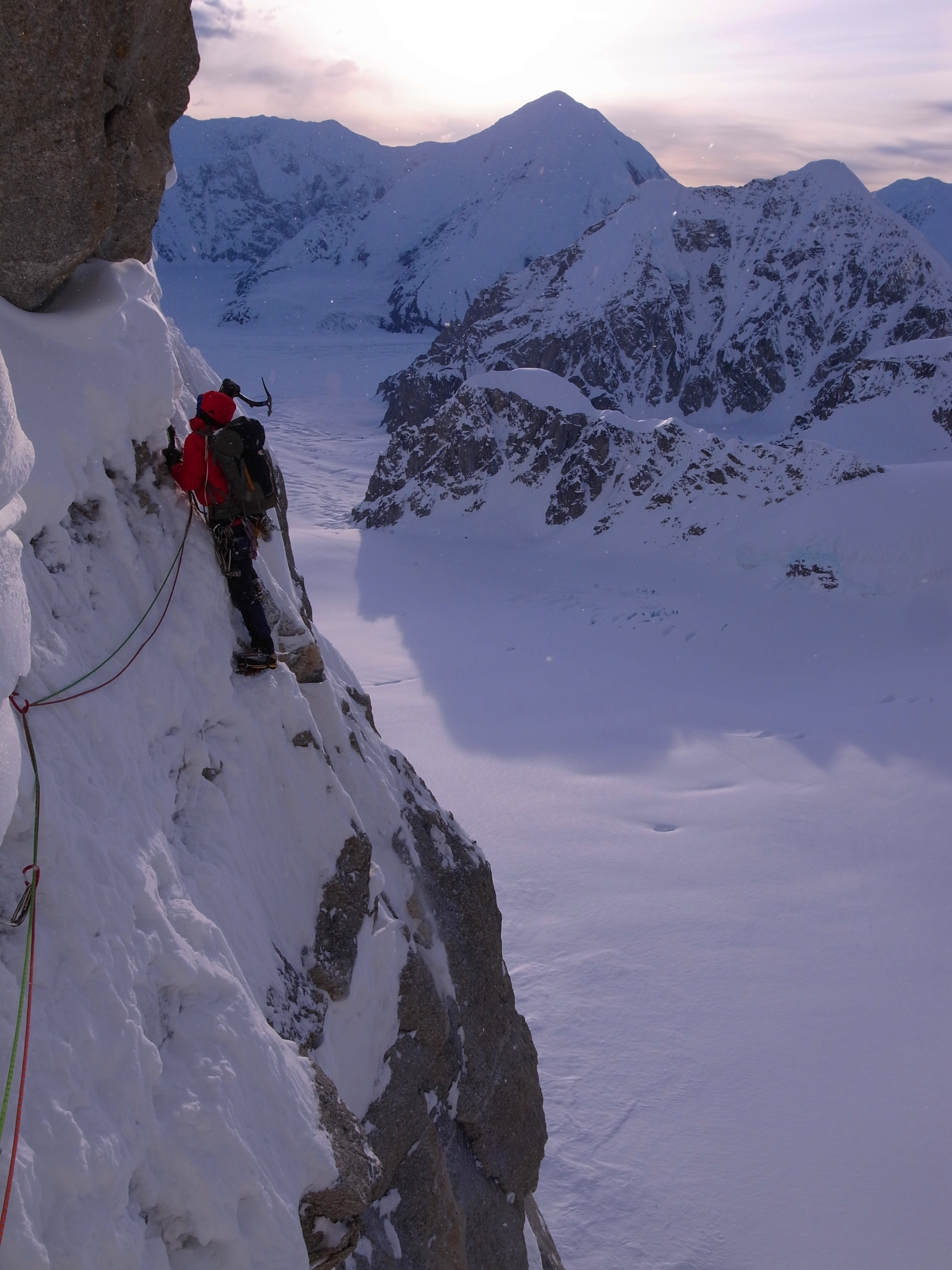
Climber on the "Tamaras traverse" of the Bibler-Klewin route (the "Moonflower" buttress) at Grade ED3, on Mount Hunter, Alaska

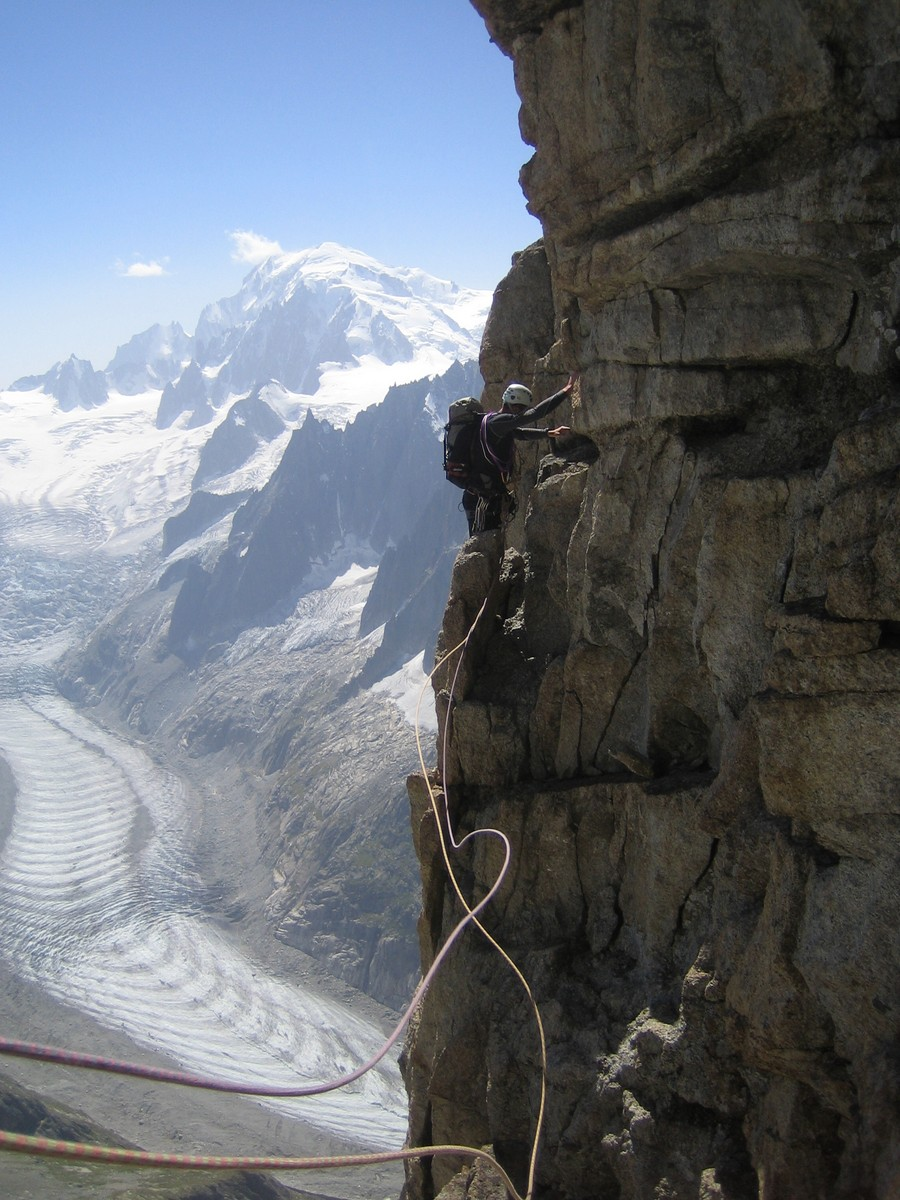
Climber on a traverse pitch on the Contamine Route (750-metres, grade TD 5c/6a, 22-pitches), South Pillar, Grand Dru, Chamonix

As in rock climbing, mountaineering also uses the term 'traverse' for sections of routes that require horizontal or lateral movement. Traverses are a particular feature in long alpine climbing routes, where—just like in big wall rock climbing—traverses are used to bypass unclimbable sections (i.e. where a direttissima is not yet possible and the climbers need to move laterally to access climbable features). One of the most famous examples is the Hinterstoisser traverse, a critical 'tension traverse' on the 1938 Heckmair Route (ED2, V−, A0, 60° snow) on the north face of the Eiger.

In mountaineering, the term is also used in a broader sense to describe large mountain routes that follow high ridges that connect several mountain peaks. A classic example of a 'mountain traverse' is Peter Croft's Evolution Traverse (VI, 5.9, 8-miles, over 3,000 metres of cumulative elevation gain CAG) in the Evolution Basin of the Sierra Nevada, which follows a rocky ridge that crosses nine peaks of over 13,000 feet in elevation, and takes circa 1–2 days to complete. Another examples of a notable 'mountain traverse' is the Cullin Ridge Traverse in Britain.

A key metric of a 'mountain traverse' is the cumulative elevation gain (CAG), which gives the total amount of vertical climbing required (e.g. a continually flat ridge across a chain of peaks will have a zero CAG outside of the initial gain to ascend up to the ridge). The greater the CAG, the less the route is like a traverse and more akin to an enchainment of peaks. Where a mountain traverse does not follow a well-defined ridge, it is also more likely to be an enchainment. A notable example of the distinction involves Everest and Lhotse: the 'Everest-Lhotse enchainment', was first completed in 2011 by American guide Michael Horst, but the harder 'Everest-Lhotse traverse' (which follows the crest of the sharp rocky ridge connecting the two peaks) remains an unsolved problem in mountaineering.

Mountaineering traverses

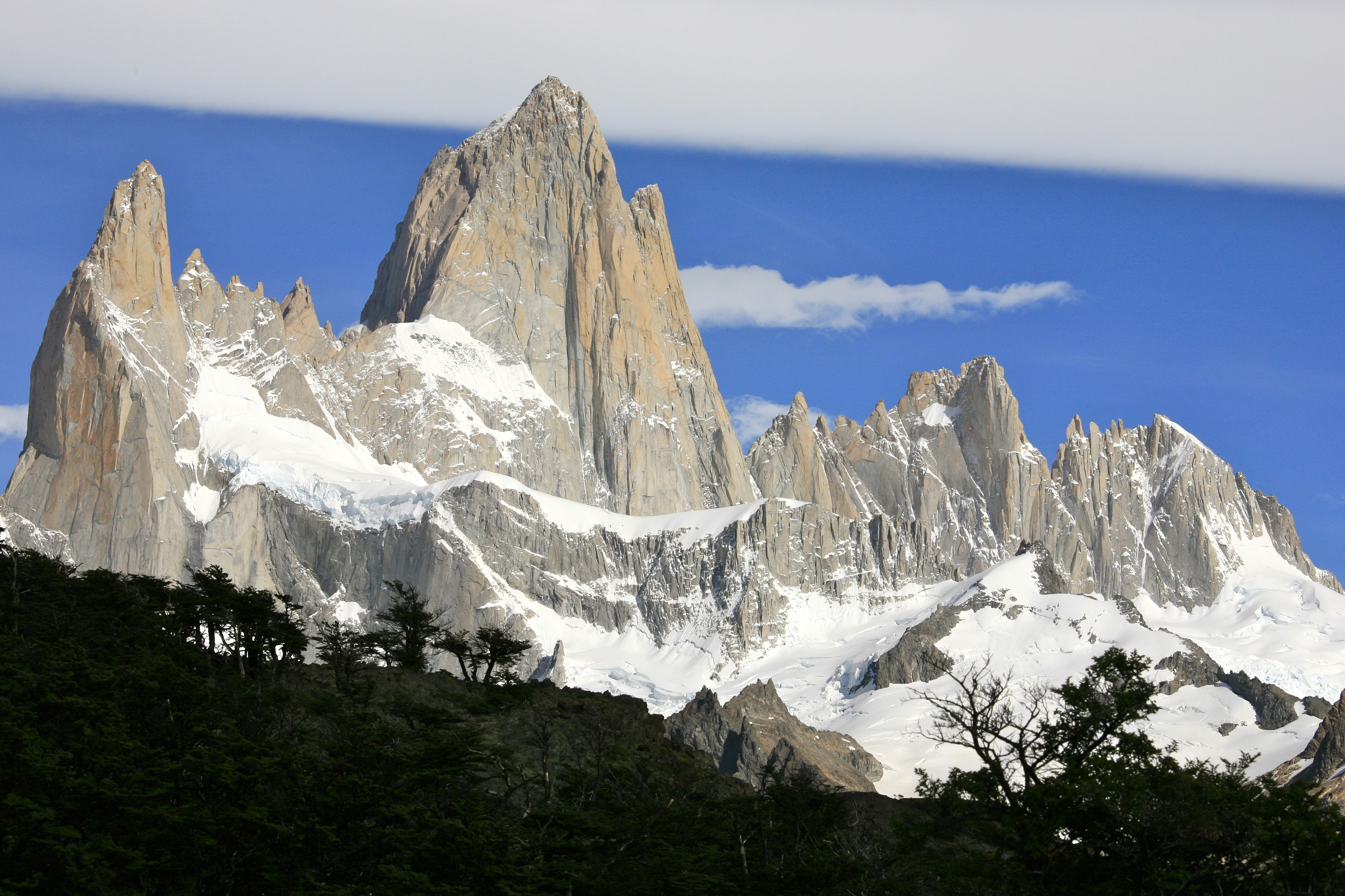
Seven peaks of the 'Fitz Roy Traverse' / 'Moonwalk Traverse', one of the hardest

The "holy grail" of the 'Everest-Lhotse-Nuptse traverse' remains unclimbed

Some of the hardest 'mountaineering traverses' include the 5 km traverse of the seven main peaks of the Cerro Chaltén Group, which is called The Fitz Roy Traverse if done north-to-south and the Moonwalk Traverse if done south-to-north, and has over 4,000 metres of CAG. The traverse of the Mazeno Ridge, which is the longest continuous ridge of any of the eight thousander mountains, is also notable. The climbers who made the first ascents of these extreme mountain traverse routes won the Piolets d'Or, which is the highest award in mountaineering. The unclimbed 'Everest-Lhotse traverse' and the even harder 'Everest-Lhotse-Nuptse traverse', are described by some as the outstanding "holy grails" of mountaineering.

== In training ==
In climbing, traversing along a climbing wall is often performed as a warm-up exercise, and to build finger strength and stamina. Standard variations include traversing using only side-pulls, or just two fingers, or only cross-throughs.

In 1968, a novice British climber named John Syrett began training obsessively by continually traversing on a low climbing wall in a long corridor of Leeds University, which was one of the first climbing walls ever constructed. On one of his first ventures to outdoor rock climbing, Syrett onsighted Wall of Horrors, which at E3 6a was one of the most intimidating traditional climbing routes in Britain. Several other British climbers followed Syrett's example so that traversing on small holds (or even on brick walls) became a staple training technique for climbers.

== See also ==
- Climbing technique
- Tyrolean traverse
