= Multi-pitch climbing =

Type of climbing

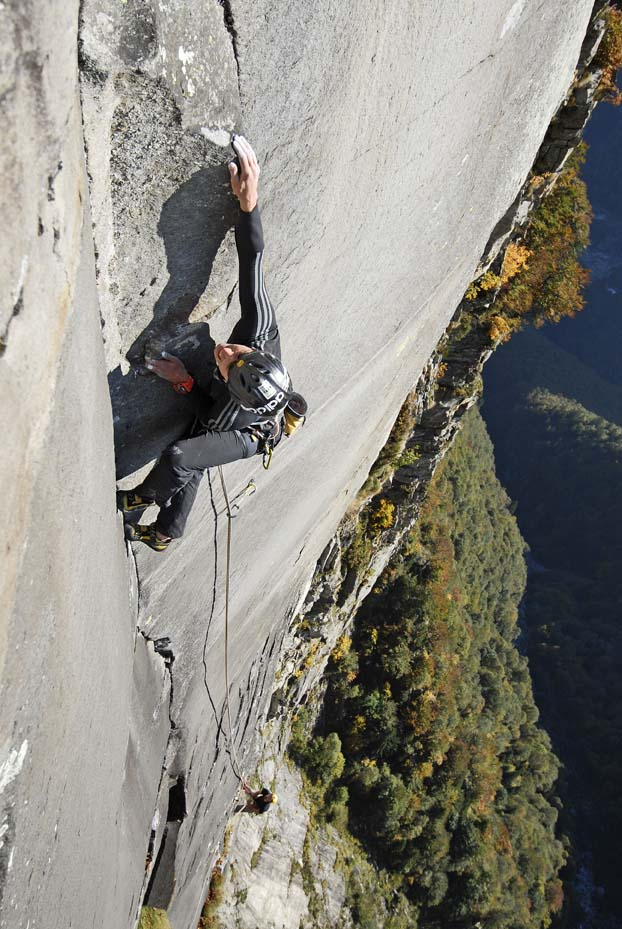
Matteo Della Bordella on pitch 2 of the 430-metre multi-pitch route, Non è un paese per vecchi (9-pitches, 7c+ max/ 7b+ obj), in Linescio, Switzerland.

Multi-pitch climbing is a type of climbing that takes place on routes that are more than a single rope length, which is approximately 50–70 metres (160–230 ft) in height or distance, preventing the lead climber completing the climb as a single pitch. Where the number of pitches exceeds 10, or approximately 300–500 metres (980–1,640 ft) in length, it becomes big wall climbing (especially if sheer); where the pitches are in a mixed rock and ice mountain environment, it becomes alpine climbing. Multi-pitch rock climbs can be in traditional, sport, and aid climbing formats. Some climbers have free soloed multi-pitch routes.

Multi-pitch climbing is more hazardous than single-pitch climbing as the climbers remain exposed on the vertical climbing route (e.g. a rock climbing route, an ice climbing, or a mixed climbing route) for a longer time. It is more technically complex and uses advanced techniques such as hanging belays, long abseils, and the creation of belay anchors. Rescues from multi-pitch climbs are more difficult and dangerous, and climbers will often use additional protection to avoid any risk of injury (e.g. the use of helmets is more common than on single-pitch routes). Multi-pitch climbing requires greater communication between climbers and advanced climbing teams can use the much quicker—but more dangerous—simul climbing technique.

== Description ==
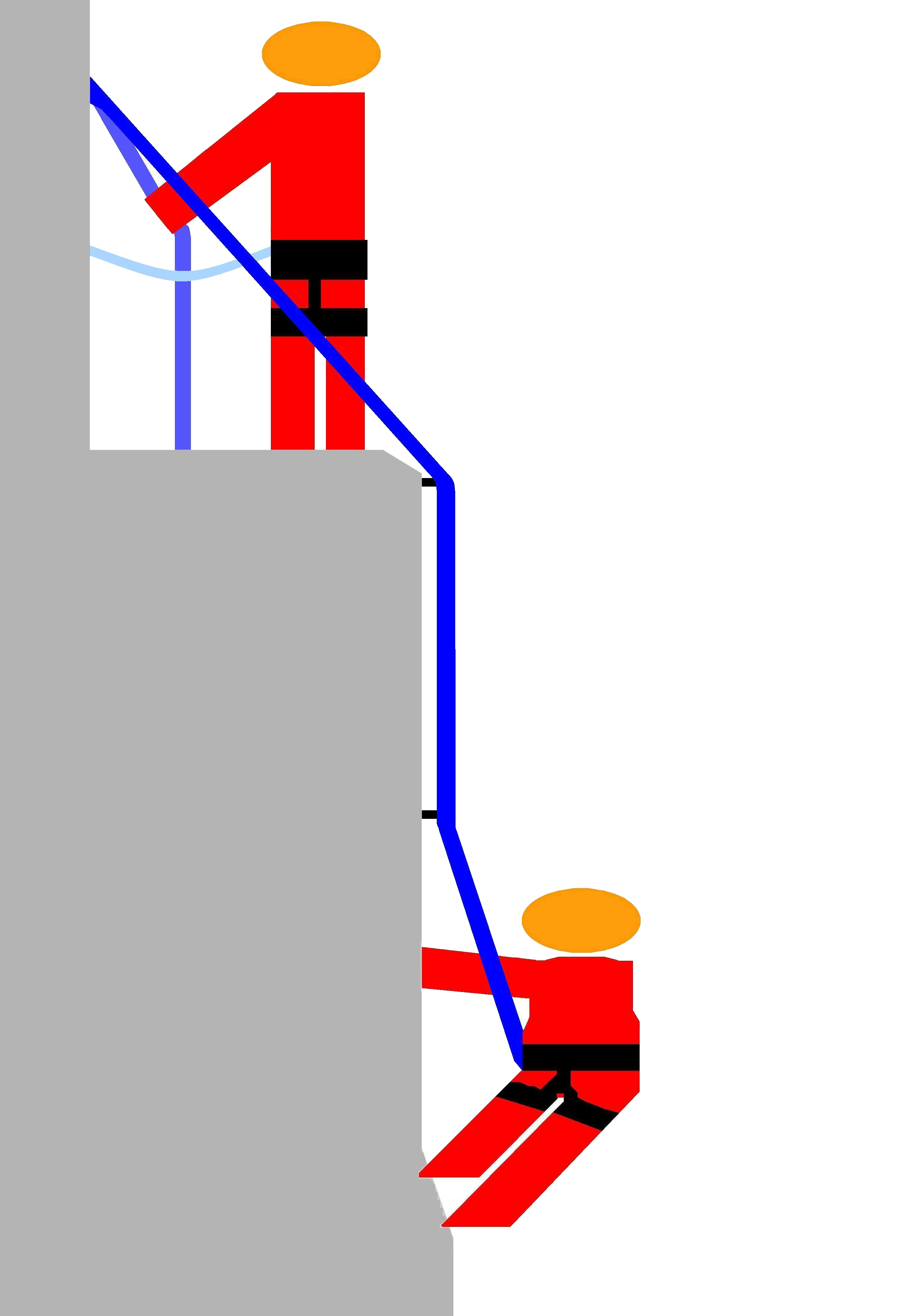
Leader (top) belaying the second (below), is an aspect of multi-pitch climbs.

Multi-pitch lead climbing involves ascending climbing routes that cannot be completed in a single pitch – which is typically a rope-length – due to their height or due to routes that move in unusual directions (e.g. routes with a lot of traversing). Multi-pitch routes are most commonly traditional climbing routes (i.e. the leader inserts the climbing protection as they ascend), but there are also multi-pitch sport climbing routes (i.e. the climbing protection is pre-bolted into the route, or at least where important belay anchors are pre-bolted such as on El Capitan in Yosemite).

Multi-pitch climbs are usually done in lead climbing pairs, and the role of leader can alternate between pitches or after a group of pitches (called "block leading"). Alternatively, one climber can lead all of the pitches while the other climber constantly belays the leader, and is then belayed themselves from the top by the lead climber after they have finished each pitch (see image). Where both climbers are very comfortable on the terrain and want to move very quickly, they can simul climb, but this is a complex and risky technique.

In addition to climbing in pairs, multi-pitch climbs can be done as solo climbs, either as free solo climbing (i.e. no climbing protection whatsoever is used, as dramatically shown in the Oscar-winning climbing documentary film, Free Solo), or as rope solo climbing (i.e. a self-belaying climbing protection system is used). Multi-pitch climbing is not exclusive to rock climbing, and related climbing disciplines such as ice climbing and mixed climbing also involve multi-pitch climbing routes.

=== Distinction with big-wall or alpine climbing ===
The distinction between what is multi-pitch climbing and what is big wall climbing or alpine climbing, is not precisely defined in the sport. Generally, multi-pitch routes that are at least 10 pitches long – i.e. 300–500 metres (980–1,640 ft) in length – and require hanging belays due to their sheer vertical nature, can be considered as "big wall routes". Long multi-pitch climbs in mountain environments where the route is not continually on a sheer big-wall face, can be considered as "alpine climbing routes".

For example, one of the most famous group of multi-pitch climbing routes are the 8b+ (5.14a) graded "Alpine Trilogy" that consist of Silbergeier (160-metres, 6-pitches, in Rätikon, Switzerland), The End of Silence (350-metres, 11-pitches, in Berchtesgaden, Germany), and Des Kaisers neue Kleider (240-metres, 9-pitches, in Fleischbank, Austria). Being in a mountain setting, the Trilogy are often also referred to as called alpine climbs, however due to their continuously sheer nature, they have been referred to as big-wall climbs.

== Equipment ==
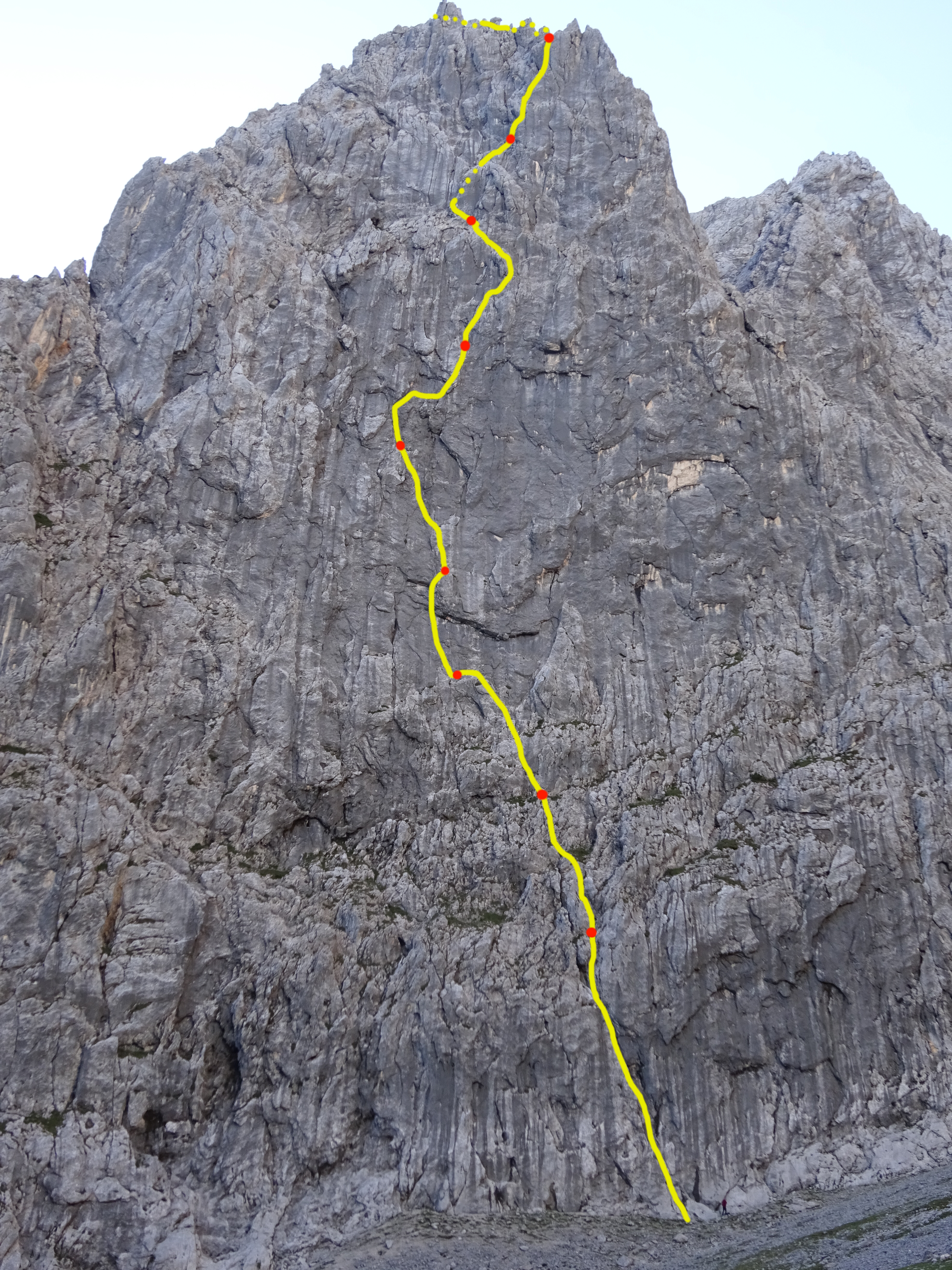
Topo of the famous 320-metre multi-pitch climbing route, Brych (9-pitches, VI+), in the Oberreintal in Germany.

Multi-pitch climbing requires all of the standard equipment used in leading a single-pitch sport, traditional or ice climbing route, but with a few specific additions:

=== Belay anchoring equipment ===
Multi-pitch climbers need additional slings, cord, and screwgate carabiners to create strong and secure belay-anchors at the end of each individual pitch. Modern multi-pitch climbers often carry personal anchor systems at belay-anchor points for greater security and flexibility. In addition, belaying from above can necessitate self-locking devices (e.g. grigris). For longer multi-pitch routes (closer to big wall climbing), ascenders might be used by the second climber to speed their progression to the belay-anchor.

=== Abseiling equipment ===
Even where the multi-pitch climbers can exit upon completing the climb via a walking trail (i.e. instead of having to abseil back down), the risk of a forced retreat during the climb means that sufficient equipment for safe abseiling is also always carried; this means having several abseil devices (e.g. starting with the basic figure 8, and extending up to more heavy-duty descenders for abseiling with heavier loads on wet ropes), additional prusik cords, and also extra coils of rope as a basic requirement.

=== Protective clothing ===
A forced abseil retreat on a multi-pitch climb can be risky, and abseiling with injured climber is a serious undertaking. Multi-pitch climbers will therefore tend to take additional precautions that they might not use on single-pitch routes such as wearing additional protective clothing and particularly climbing helmets and belay gloves (or fingerless climbing gloves), to minimize the risk of a forced retreat due to any type of injury. They will also bring additional food and water provisions and all-weather clothing as well.

== Techniques ==
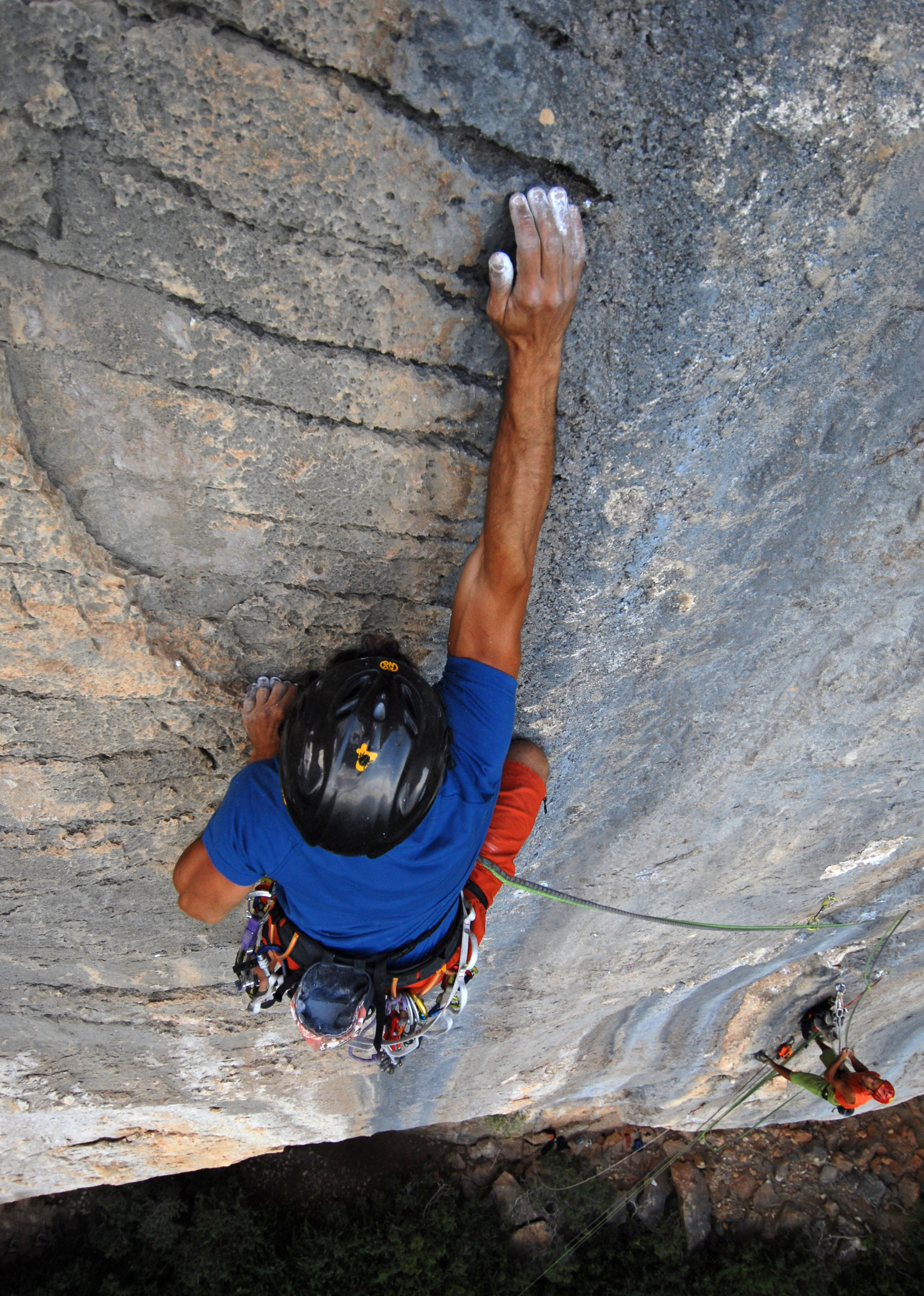
Lead climber and belayer in a hanging belay position, on pitch 2 of the 300-metre multi-pitch route, Genius 8b (5.13d) (9-pitches: 6b, 8b, 7b+, 6a, 7c+, 7c+, 7c, 6c, 6c), on Monte Ginnircu, Sardinia

Many of the techniques of single-pitch lead climbing are common to multi-pitch climbing, but there are specific techniques that are important in order to safely ascend a multi-pitch route:

=== Belay anchors ===
A key technique is the ability to create very robust belay anchors that can hold the strong downward and upward forces a belayer can experience on a multi-pitch route in any climber fall. Some of these anchors may also need to be used later as abseil points in the event of a retreat or after summiting the route. Popular multi-pitch routes can have permanent in-situ bolted belay anchors that climbers can use.

=== Hanging belays ===
Some routes will have belay points that have no ledge to stand on, and thus the belayer will be hanging off the rock face at the belay anchor, which is called a hanging belay. Using a hanging belay to belay a climber from above can require additional belay equipment (such as a grigri), and will require additional techniques to avoid forces being applied directly to the belayer's harness in the event of a climber fall.

=== Changing leads ===
Climbers sometimes need to be able to switch roles efficiently at the end of each pitch. Where the climbing pair alternate the lead climber role, the second climber can continue past the belay to lead the next pitch (i.e. so that the belayer keeps belaying). Where they need to swap roles at the belay anchor, there are a number of techniques required to ensure that the changeover is done safely and efficiently.

=== Communication ===
Because of the greater distances between climbers (the individual pitches of multi-pitch routes are often typically a full rope-length), and the need for the lead climber to have the time to set up a strong belay anchor, it is important that the pair understand the signals and climbing commands that indicate when such tasks have been completed and the lead climber is ready to belay. Some climbers carry lightweight walkie-talkies.

=== Fall factors ===
Multi-pitch climbers need to avoid situations where the lead climber falls but have not yet placed any climbing protection on the route—in such a situation, they would fall all the way down to the belayer and then keep falling the same distance again below the belayer until the rope became taught. Such a fall has a fall factor of 2 and will create significant strains on both the belay anchors and the belayer. To avoid this, the lead climber will usually place their first piece of protection just above the belay anchor.

=== Rope management ===
Once the lead climber creates a new belay anchor to belay their partner below, they need to take in the slack rope until there is a taut line between the pair. As they will often be standing on a small platform (or no platform in a hanging belay), they need to ensure that the rope they pull up does not get caught up equipment or get tangled, and will therefore use some manner of coiling technique.

=== Time management ===
Retreat from a multi-pitch climb can be difficult and will typically require abseils, which are in themselves a risk factor. Climbers thus need to be aware of their time-keeping, and the specific points at which retreat becomes more difficult, and/or where abseil points are less plentiful (some popular multi-pitch routes have bolted belay anchors that double as abseil points), or take the climbers off-route.

== Competition multi-pitch climbing ==
In October 2022, the first competition climbing event in a multi-pitch format was hosted on an artificial climbing wall built on the Verzasca Dam in Switzerland as the 'Red Bull Dual Ascent'. Teams of climbing pairs faced off in head-to-head contests on identical side-by-side 6-pitch 180-metre (590 ft) routes, with the winning team finishing the route in the fastest time. Unlimited falls were allowed as long as the lead climber returned to the base of the pitch (or penalty points were accepted instead). The first event was won by Alberto Ginés López and Luka Potočar. The October 2023 event was held in a mixed team format, with Jernej Kruder and his sister Julija Kruder taking first prize.

== Grading ==
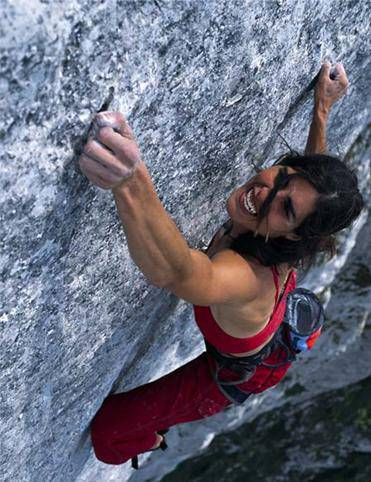
Josune Bereziartu on the 300-metre multi-pitch sport climb Yeah Man 8b+ (5.14a) (9-pitches: 7a, 7b+, 7b+, 7c, 8a+, 8a/+, 8a, 8b+, 7a), north face of Grand Pfad, Switzerland.

Multi-pitch climbing routes are graded for technical difficulty in much the same way as for single-pitch sport-route grading, traditional-route grading, and ice-route grading, although attempts have been made to introduce "committment scales" to account for the overall difficulty of the route enabling a differenciation between one with 9 easy pitches and one hard pitch versus another with 10 hard pitches.

Each pitch on a multi-pitch route will be separately graded as an individual pitch so, for example, a 3-pitch multi-sport climbing route might be graded as French sport: 7c, 7b, 8a; or a 5-pitch multi-traditional climbing route might be graded as American YDS: 5.10a, 5.10b, 5.10a, 5.11c, 5.9. Harder or easier options on individual pitches will also be highlighted and separately graded, so that, for example, a pitch might be graded as French sport: 7c "avoidable" or "max" (you do not have to do the 7c part) / 7a "obligatory" or "obj" (you will have to do at least 7a graded climbing). An "overall" grade is quoted for multi-pitch routes which is usually the grade of the hardest pitch on the route (e.g. see Yeah Man image opposite).

In common with big wall grading, where there are very difficult sections of individual pitches that are well above the general level of difficulty of the overall route (i.e. it is less common to find a big wall with a constant or narrow range of difficulty throughout), an aid climbing option might be highlighted which will have an attached aid climbing grade. For example, an individual pitch on a multi-traditional climbing route might be graded as: 5.10a (with no aid) or 5.7 A2 (with aid), and the type of aid needed also explained.

== In film ==
A number of notable films have been made focused on multi-pitch (and big wall climbing), including:

- El Capitan, a 1978 documentary film about an early ascent of The Nose (VI 5.9 C2) on El Capitan.
- Meru, a 2015 documentary film about the ascent of a Himalayan big wall route called the Shark's Fin.
- Valley Uprising, a 2014 Amazon Prime documentary film about rock climbing in Yosemite, that includes big wall climbing.
- The Dawn Wall, a 2017 Netflix documentary film about Tommy Caldwell and Kevin Jorgeson's ascent of the first-ever big wall route at 5.14d (9a).
- Free Solo, a 2018 Netflix documentary film about Alex Honnold's free solo climb of Freerider 5.13a (7c+) on El Capitan.
- The Alpinist, a 2021 documentary film about the late Canadian alpinist Marc-André Leclerc, featuring his solo ascent of Torre Egger in Patagonia.

== See also ==
- Alpine climbing
- Big wall climbing
- List of grade milestones in rock climbing
