= Rope team =

Technique used in climbing

Examples of rope teams

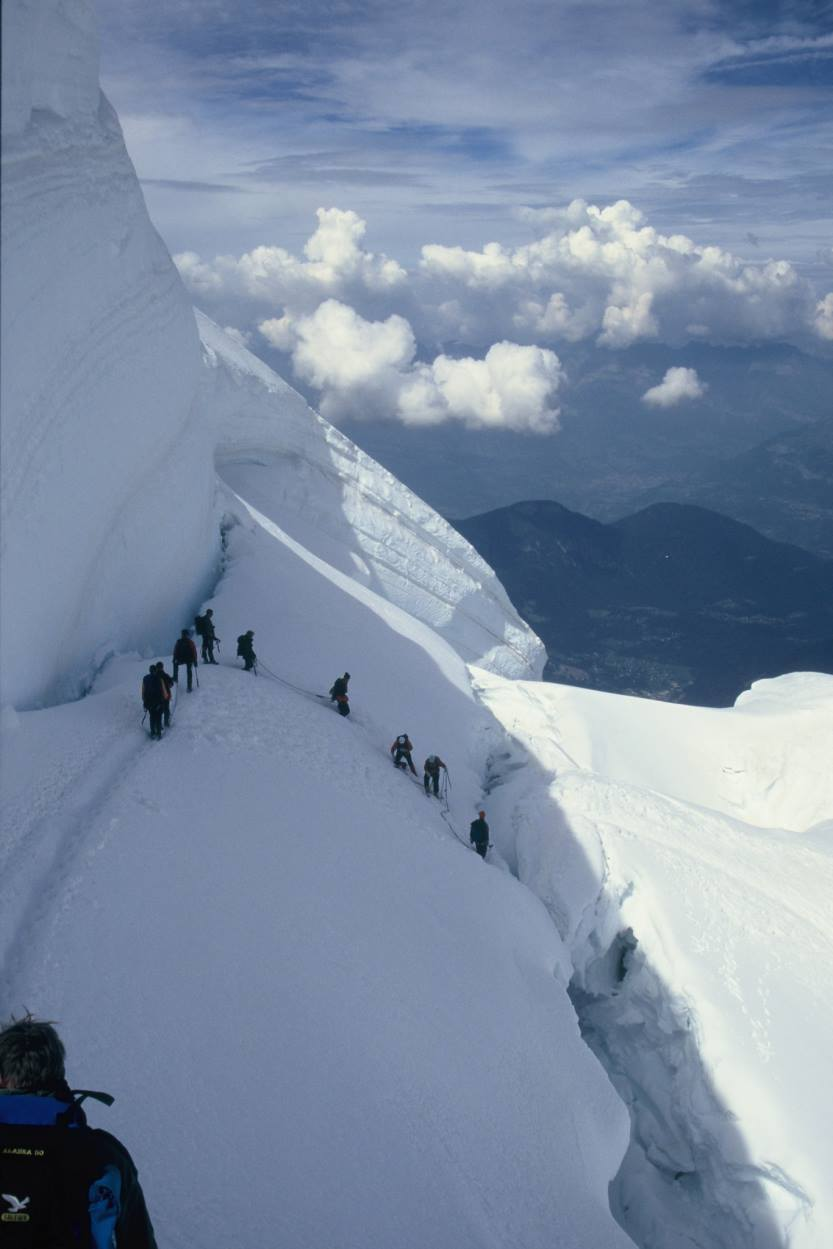
Several rope teams on Mont Maudit

A rope team crossing the Rochefort Ridge in the Mont Blanc massif

A rope team (sometimes also called moving together) is a climbing technique where two or more climbers who are attached to a single climbing rope move simultaneously together along easy-angled terrain that does not require points of fixed climbing protection to be inserted along the route. Rope teams contrast with simul-climbing, which involves only two climbers and where they are ascending steep terrain that will require many points of protection to be inserted along the route. A specific variant of a rope team is the technique of short-roping, which is used by mountain guides to help weaker clients, and which also does not employ fixed climbing protection points.

Rope teams are commonly used in alpine climbing, particularly for moving across glaciers and traveling along snow slopes and ridges. Members are typically spaced 30 feet (9.1 metres) apart with any surplus rope coiled and carried by the first and last members. The weaker members of the team are placed in the middle, however, it is important that the team can move together in a way that the rope does not become excessively slack or taut. Rope teams can accommodate many climbers, which gives greater "holding power" if a member falls into a crevasse or slides down a snow slope. However, large teams are also less flexible, which is a problem on more varied terrain where the rope team might want to quickly change to a short-roping or even a simul-climbing format.

Some rope teams will simply tie each member directly into the rope via a climbing knot (e.g. figure-eight on a bight attached to a screw-gate carabiner), however, members can also be attached via prussik knots or progress capture devices for greater flexibility. When crossing glaciers, some rope teams will pre-apply prussik knots and loops to the rope to speed up the rescue of any member who falls into a crevasse, however, some don't as these knots and loops can make the rope more difficult to manage. When small rope teams of 2-3 climbers are crossing glaciers, additional knots can be added to the rope to act as a partial brake against a crevasse lip in the event of a fall. On exposed snow slopes, rope teams may use snow anchors as points of climbing protection — as in simul-climbing — to prevent a falling member from dragging the entire team down the slope before they can self-arrest.

Various records have been set for the longest climbing rope-teams at various altitudes. In July 2017, the Italian Alpine Club set a Guinness World Record for the world's longest static rope team when 2,846 climbers were connected to a single rope in Bergamo in Italy. In 2022, eighty female mountaineers set a record for the world's longest women's climbing rope team by summiting the Breithorn.

== See also ==
- Alpine climbing
- Rope solo climbing
- Simul climbing
