= Alpine climbing =

Type of mountaineering

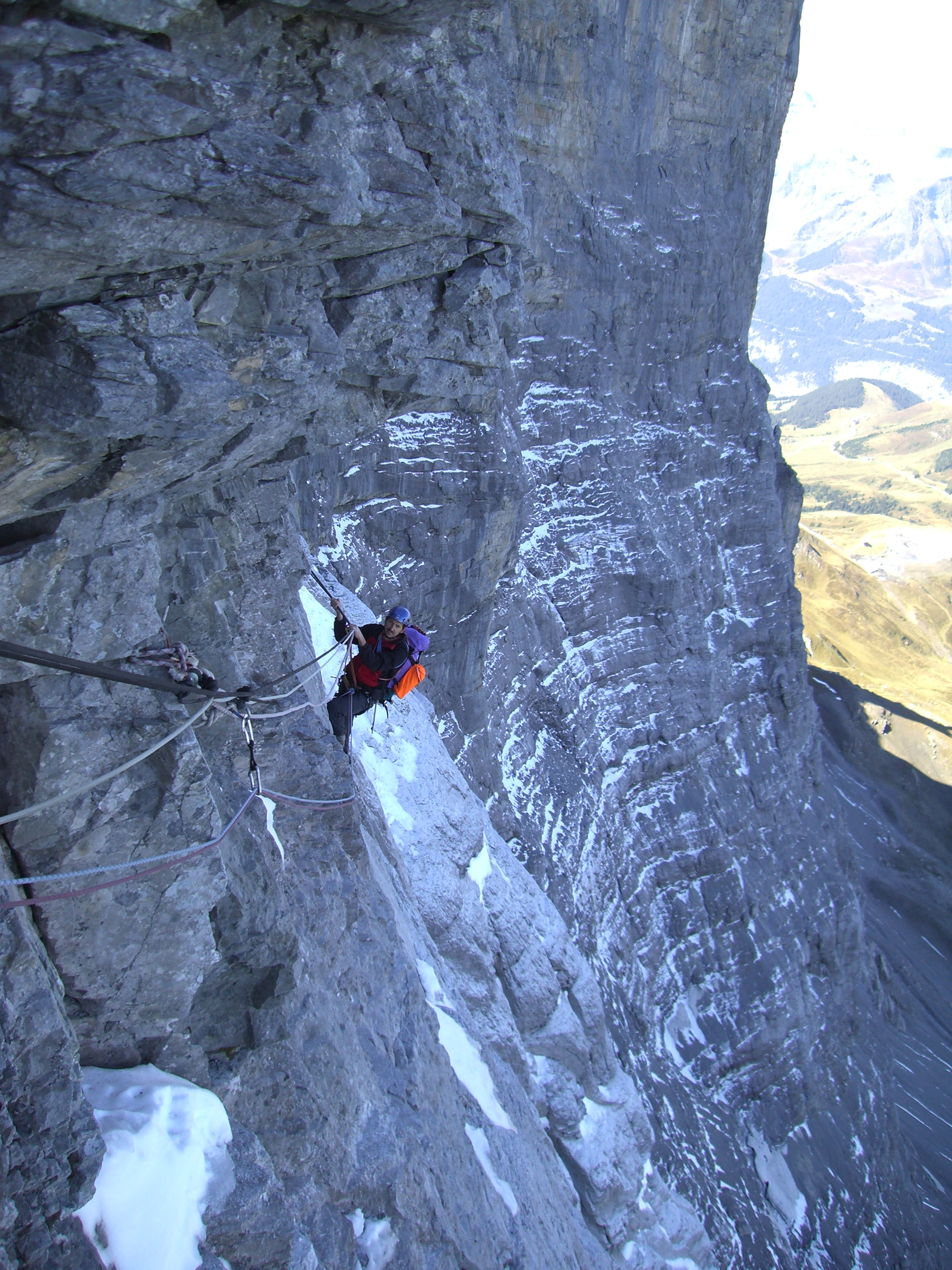
Alpinist on the Hinterstoisser traverse on the classic Eiger north face climbing route, the 1938 Heckmair Route (graded ED2, V−, A0, 60° snow).

Alpine climbing (German: Alpinklettern) is a type of mountaineering that uses any of a broad range of advanced climbing techniques, including rock climbing, ice climbing, and/or mixed climbing, to summit typically large rock, ice, or snow-covered climbing routes (e.g., multi-pitch or big wall climbs) in mountainous environments. Alpine climbing began in the European Alps, but is now performed in any remote mountainous area, including in the Himalayas and Patagonia. To climb alpine style is to do so in small lightly-equipped teams who carry all their equipment (e.g., no porters are used) and do all of the climbing themselves (e.g., no sherpas or reserve teams).

Alpinists face many additional risks beyond the risks of falling that is associated with the activity of rock and ice climbing. These risks include major rockfalls (common with large sheer rock faces in alpine environments), of avalanches (especially in couloirs), of falling seracs and of falling into crevasses, of violent storms on exposed mountain faces, of altitude effects (dehydration, edema, frostbite), of complex navigation and route finding, of long dangerous abseils, and of the difficulty of rescue or retreat due to the remoteness of the setting. Long routes may require alpinists to move simultaneously to maintain speed (e.g., in simul climbing or as rope teams), which carries its own risks.

The first "golden age" of modern alpine-climbing saw the first free ascents – in summer, in winter, and as solo – of the great north faces of the Alps by pioneers such as Walter Bonatti, Riccardo Cassin and Gaston Rebuffat. Today's subsequent era focuses on the ascents and enchainments of the ice and snow-covered faces and ridges of major Himalayan peaks (e.g., the eight-thousanders, Latok, and The Ogre in Pakistan) and Patagonian peaks (e.g., Cerro Torre Group, Fitz Roy Group in South America) in "alpine style" by pioneers such as Hermann Buhl, Reinhold Messner and Doug Scott, and latterly by alpinists such as Ueli Steck, Mick Fowler, Paul Ramsden, and Marko Prezelj. The annual Piolets d'Or – the "Oscars of mountaineering" – are awarded for the year's best achievements in alpine climbing.

== Description ==
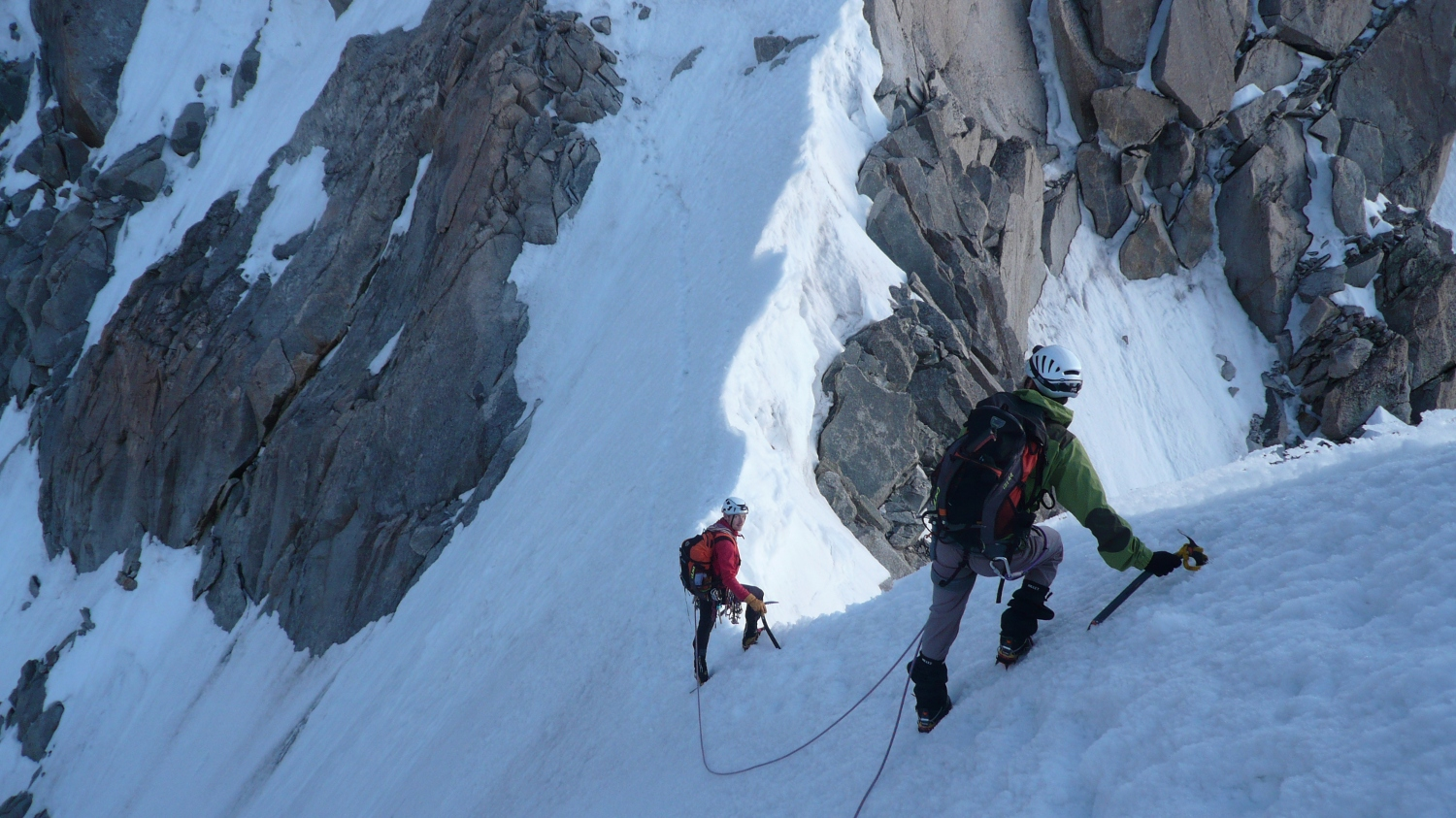
Moving together on Kuffner Ridge (D, UIAA V, French 4c), Mont Maudit.

Alpine climbing involves small unsupported teams tackling large multi-pitch (or big wall) climbing routes that can involve various combinations of rock climbing, ice climbing, and mixed climbing, in alpine-type mountain environments. Alpine routes are often long and require a full day of climbing, or even several days. Because of the length of the routes, and the danger of alpine environments (e.g. rockfall, avalanche, altitude, weather, etc.), alpine climbers (or "alpinists") typically try routes that are well within their technical rock, ice, and mixed climbing abilities.

While parts of an alpine route will involve a lead climber tackling difficult rock, ice, or mixed sections while being belayed by a stationary second climber below, parts will involve both climbers moving simultaneously together as a rope team, particularly on large snow slopes or easier rock sections. Simultaneous climbing (or simul climbing) is riskier but is necessary to ensure that the climbers can move quickly through what is often a very dangerous and exposed environment (e.g. rockfall on open ice fields), and complete the long alpine climbing routes in a reasonable timeframe.

Alpine climbing can involve aid climbing, particularly if high up on a route, aid is needed to make progress and avoid a dangerous retreat. It can also involve multiple and complex abseils, either on the descent or in a retreat from a route. Classic alpine climbing routes often take at least a full day of climbing which necessitates the early "alpine start" (and helps to avoid the afternoon rockfalls), and may need a bivouac. It often involves traveling on glaciers and bergschrunds to get to and from the route (and in the dark for "alpine starts").

Due to the greater complexity and risks of alpine climbing, alpinists need to be much more familiar with and confident in each team member's abilities and skill level. Alpine climbing involves exercising judgment and decision-making to adapt to the constantly changing alpine weather and route conditions (e.g. changing snow and ice levels), and where good initial progress can quickly turn into a fight for the team's very survival (e.g. as chronicled during many famous alpine climbs of north-faces, such as in The White Spider that recounts the 1936 Eiger climbing disaster).

=== Alpine style ===
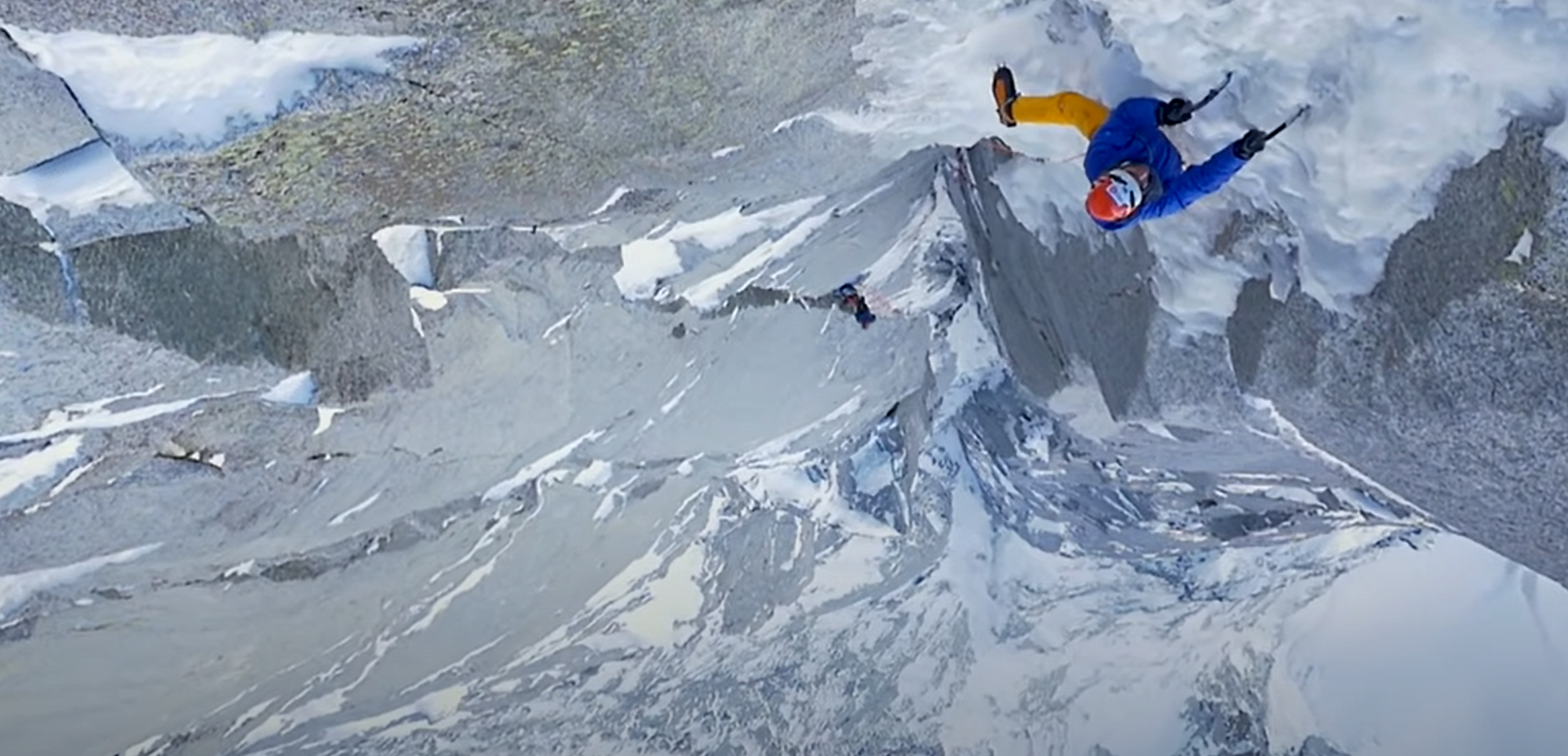
Ueli Steck making a rapid 'alpine style' one-day ascent of North Couloir Direct (VI, Al 6+, M8) a major alpine climbing route on Les Drus, which normally requires several days climbing.

The derived term "alpine style" alludes to the fashion of alpine climbing to be in small fast-moving teams – or even as solo climbing – all of whom carry their own equipment (e.g. no porters), and do all of the climbing (e.g. no Sherpas or reserve teams laying down fixed ropes). Alpine-style is the opposite of expedition style (which is sometimes also pejoratively called "siege style" climbing), and is often considered a "purer" form of climbing and mountaineering.

Alpine style also means being lightly equipped; this can mean no supplementary oxygen, no major tenting or overnight equipment, and limited food and fuel supplies. It also means having minimal or no fixed ropes on the route (an important safety feature of expedition-style mountaineering). While these attributes enable alpine climbers to move quickly and take advantage of good conditions and "weather windows", it also makes alpine climbing far more dangerous. In situations where the habitually unstable high-altitude weather turns, alpine climbers will not have the provisions to "sit-out" the storm, and will not have the fixed ropes in place to retreat safely and quickly; such forced retreats in poor conditions are dangerous.

== Types of routes ==
Types of alpine climbing routes

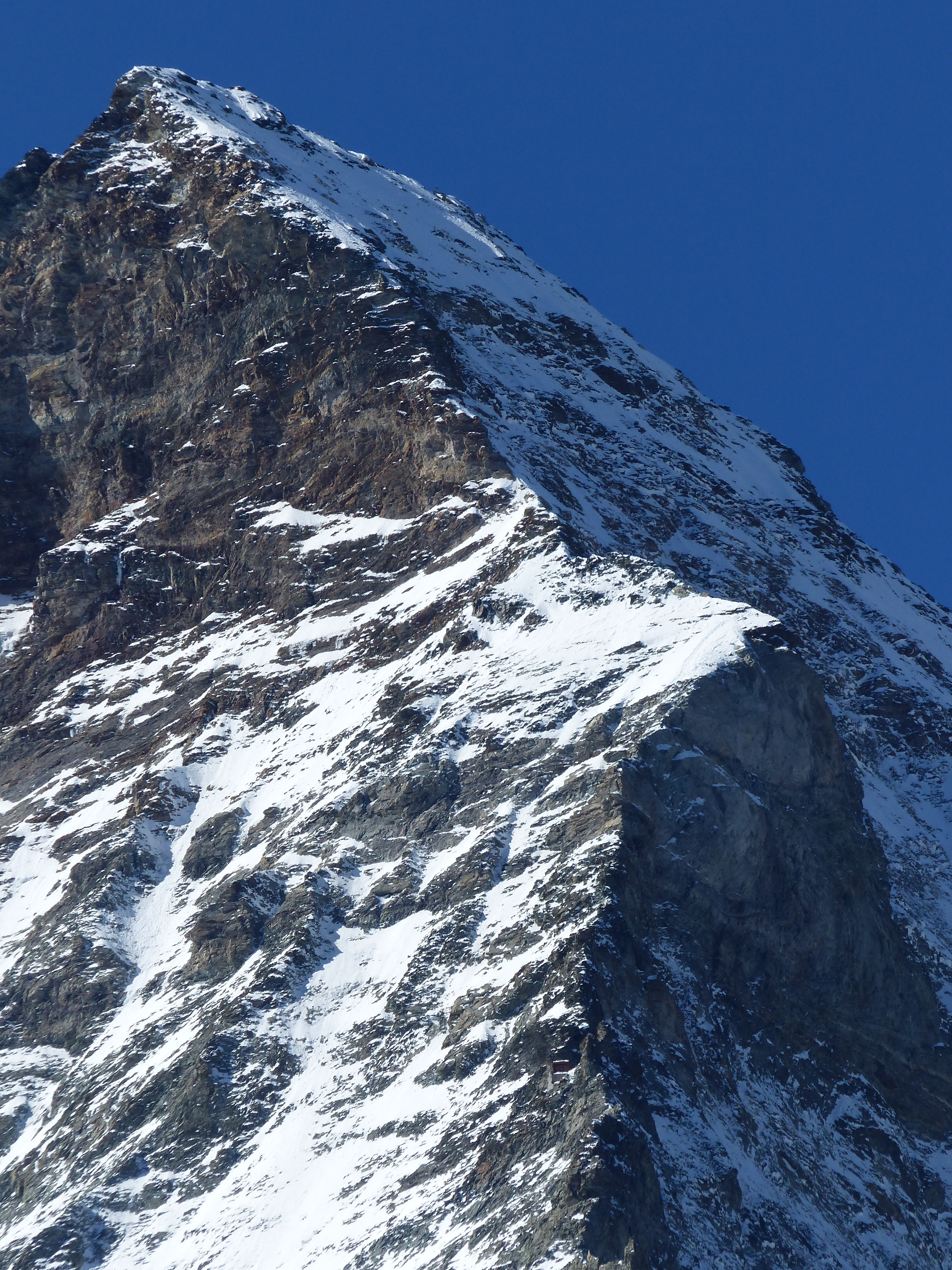
Matterhorn Hörnli Ridge (1,220 m, AD III) of the Matterhorn

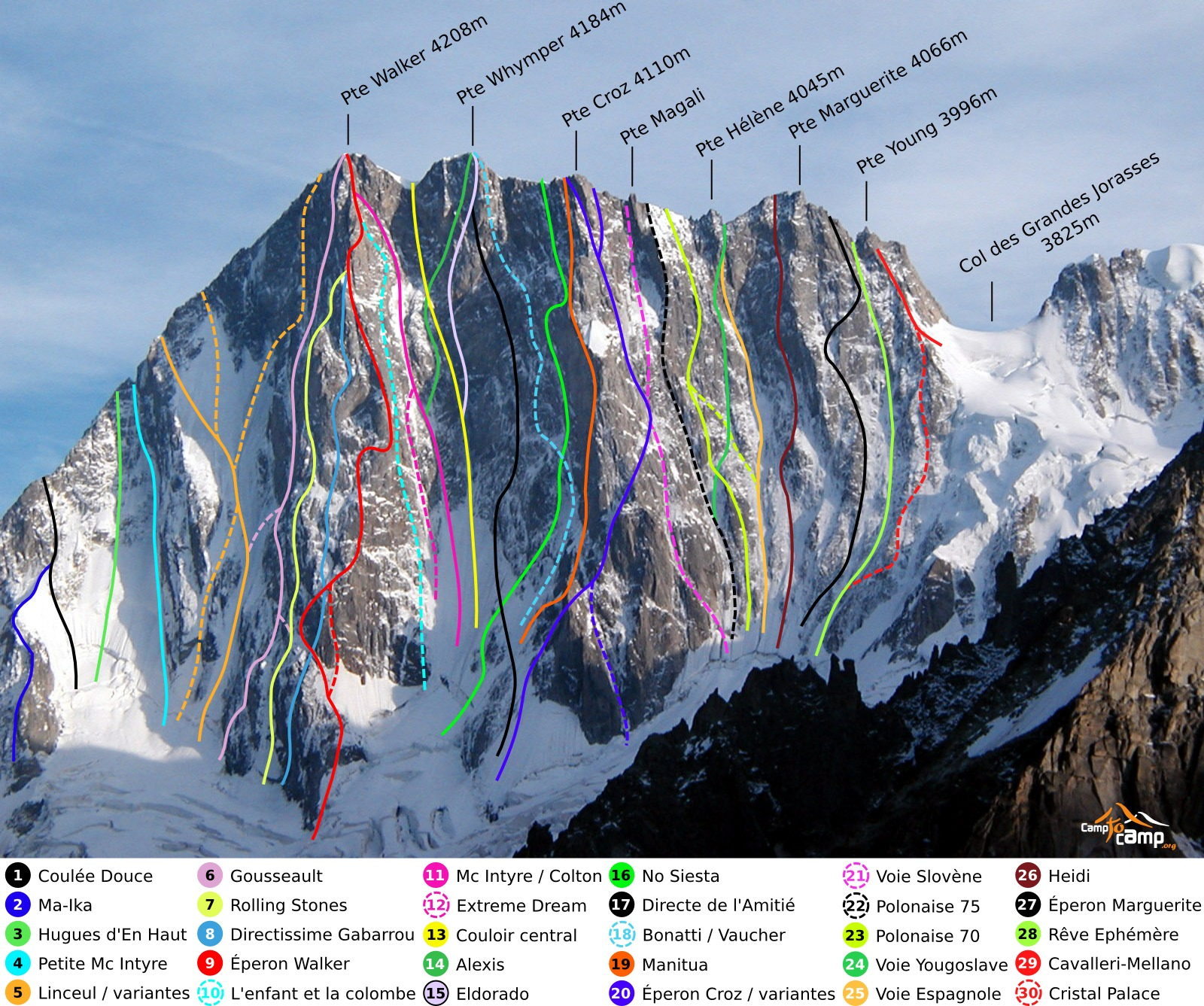
Grandes Jorasses North Face: Routes include couloirs, rock-pillars / buttresses, and open faces.

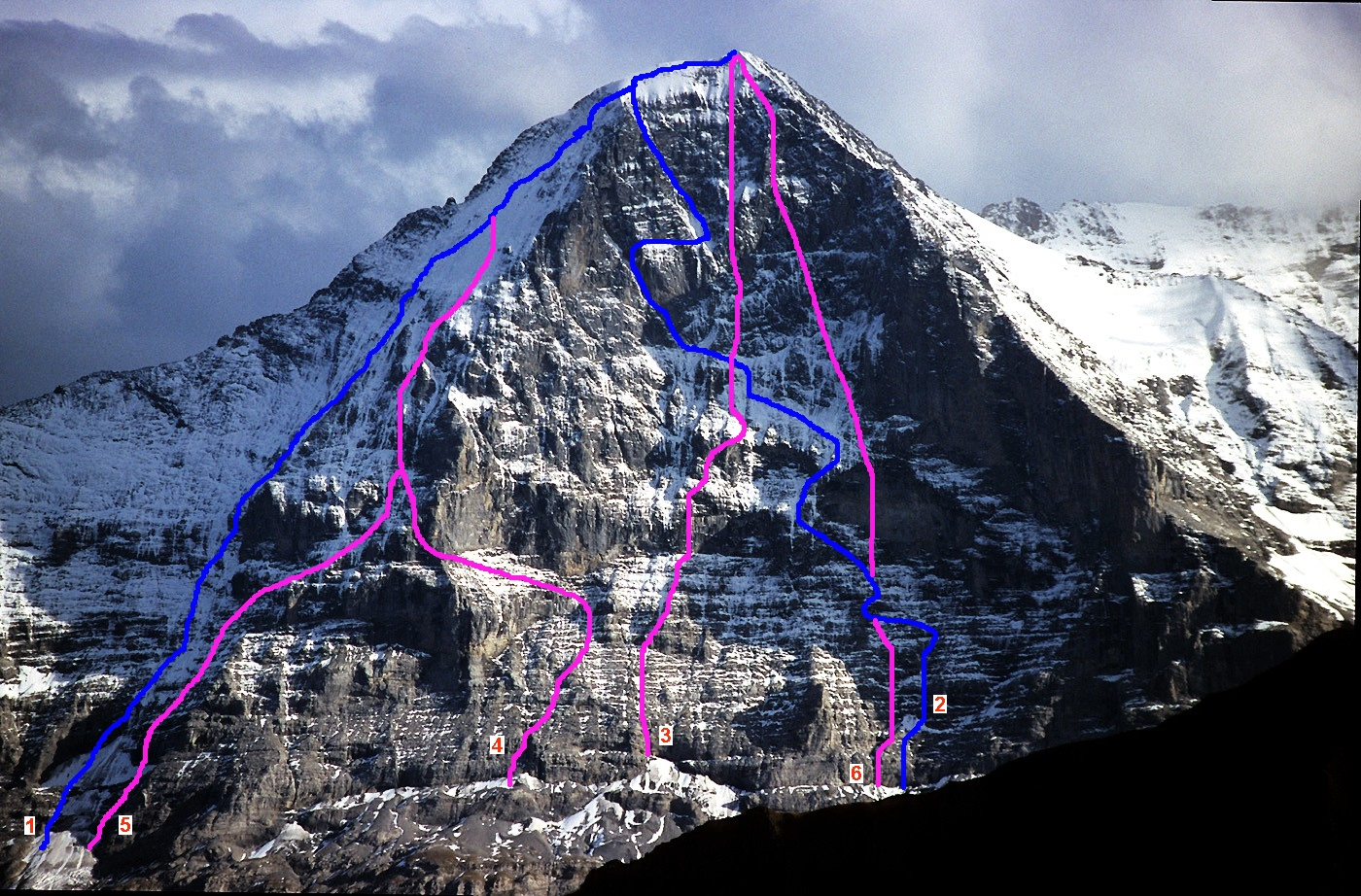
Eiger North Face: The original 1938 Heckmair Route (blue-line #2) contrasts with the 1966 Harlin Direttissima

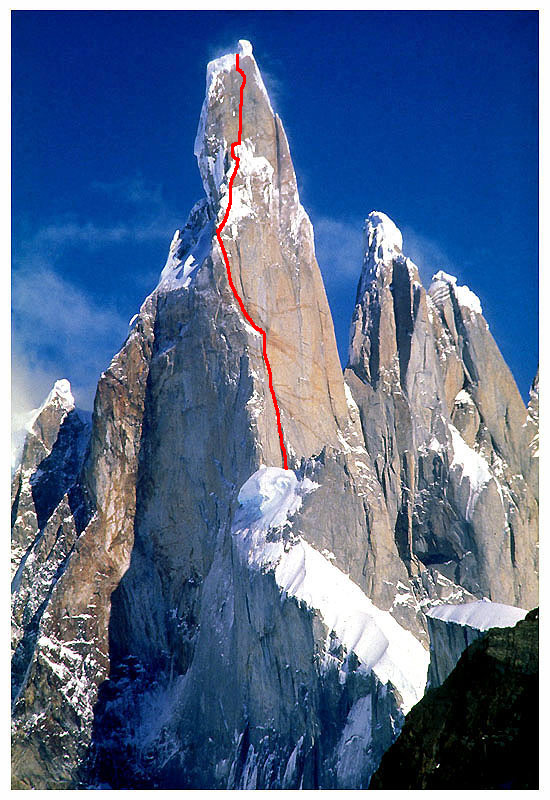
Cerro Torre Compressor Route SE Ridge

Alpine climbing encompasses a broad range of climbing routes, not all of which reach the peak of the mountain. They are typically long multi-pitch routes with a mixture of rock, ice and/or snow surfaces. The most straightforward route to the peak is often the easiest and thus the busiest, is called the voie normale. These routes generally follow a ridge that rises at a less steeper angle then other options to the top (e.g., the Hörnli Ridge on the Matterhorn), or an easier angled slope that rises to a col that can then follow a summit-ridge to the top (e.g., the Boccalatte-Pointe Walker route on the Grandes Jorasses).

After the first ascent, climbers will look to ascend via the main ridges and the main faces of the mountain. While face-routes are typically more severe due to their greater steepness, there are many notable ridge-routes that are equally serious undertakings due to their length and complexity (e.g., Everest's North East Ridge, Nanga Parbat's Mazeno Ridge or the Compressor Route on Cerro Torre's South East Ridge ). Climbers will also look to climb prominent features on the faces such as couloirs (e.g., the SuperCouloir), and ribs, spurs or pillars of rock (e.g., the Bonatti Pillar or the Walker Spur).

In alpine climbing, north-face routes are often the most challenging as their northerly aspect means that that they are more ice-covered and avalanche prone all year round, and they are hit by more serious weather systems than the other faces (e.g, the famous 1938 Heckmair Route on the Eiger). The Great north faces of the Alps are considered major testpieces for alpine climbers. Major alpine climbing peaks will have many routes on all their faces, some following different crack systems or physical features, and others being harder technical refinements of earlier routes such as direttissimas.

== Equipment ==
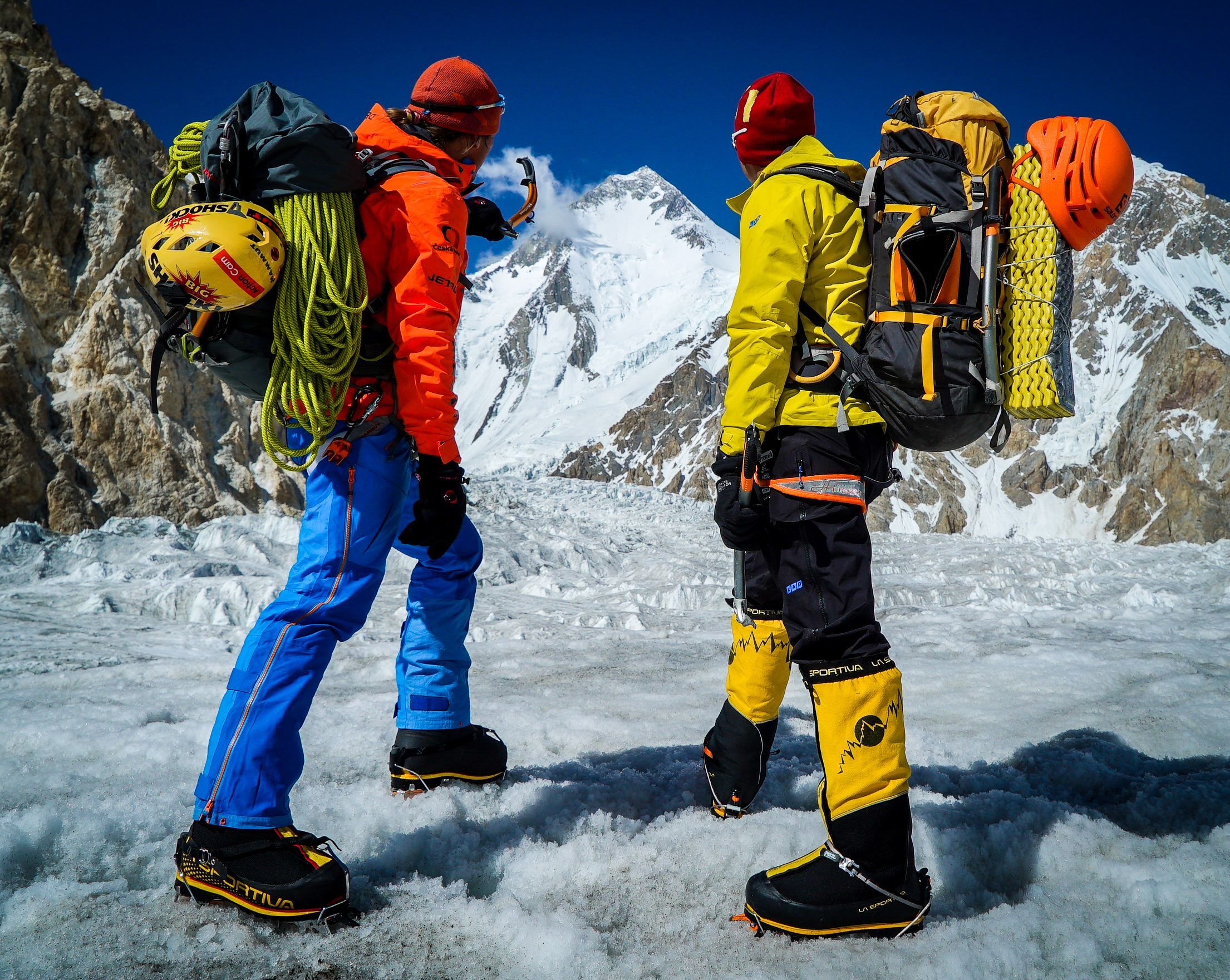
Czech alpinists Marek Holeček and Tomáš Petreček wearing their full gear, about to start their unsuccessful 2015 alpine-style ascent of the southwest face of Gasherbrum I

While alpine climbers are lightly equipped due to the fact that they must carry all of their equipment while climbing, the range of climbing equipment needed can be considerable due to the diverse range of climbing techniques required on major alpine routes, and the harsh conditions encountered.

- Rock-climbing equipment: Routes with rock climbing require the equipment needed for traditional climbing. Alpinists may hammer in bolts or pitons while climbing the route in order to give additional protection in the manner of a sport climbing route (i.e. where traditional climbing protection is not usable). Use of climbing helmets is common given the danger of rockfall on alpine-type routes.
- Ice climbing equipment: Routes involving ice or snow require the equipment needed for ice climbing or mixed climbing. In particular, ice axes, ice screws, and crampons will be required, as well as some of the broader tools needed for climbing in snow conditions such as avalanche equipment and snow belay systems. Alpine climbers may have to change from their heavy rigid ice climbing boots into soft rubber-soled rock climbing shoes while on the route.
- Big wall climbing equipment: Routes involving a large number of vertical rock pitches, may also require the additional equipment typical in big wall climbing, such as portaledges, bivouac sacks, and haul bags, as well as the specialized equipment for extensive and heavy-duty abseiling; and also elements of aid climbing equipment to ensure progress can still be made where free climbing is not possible.

== Risks ==
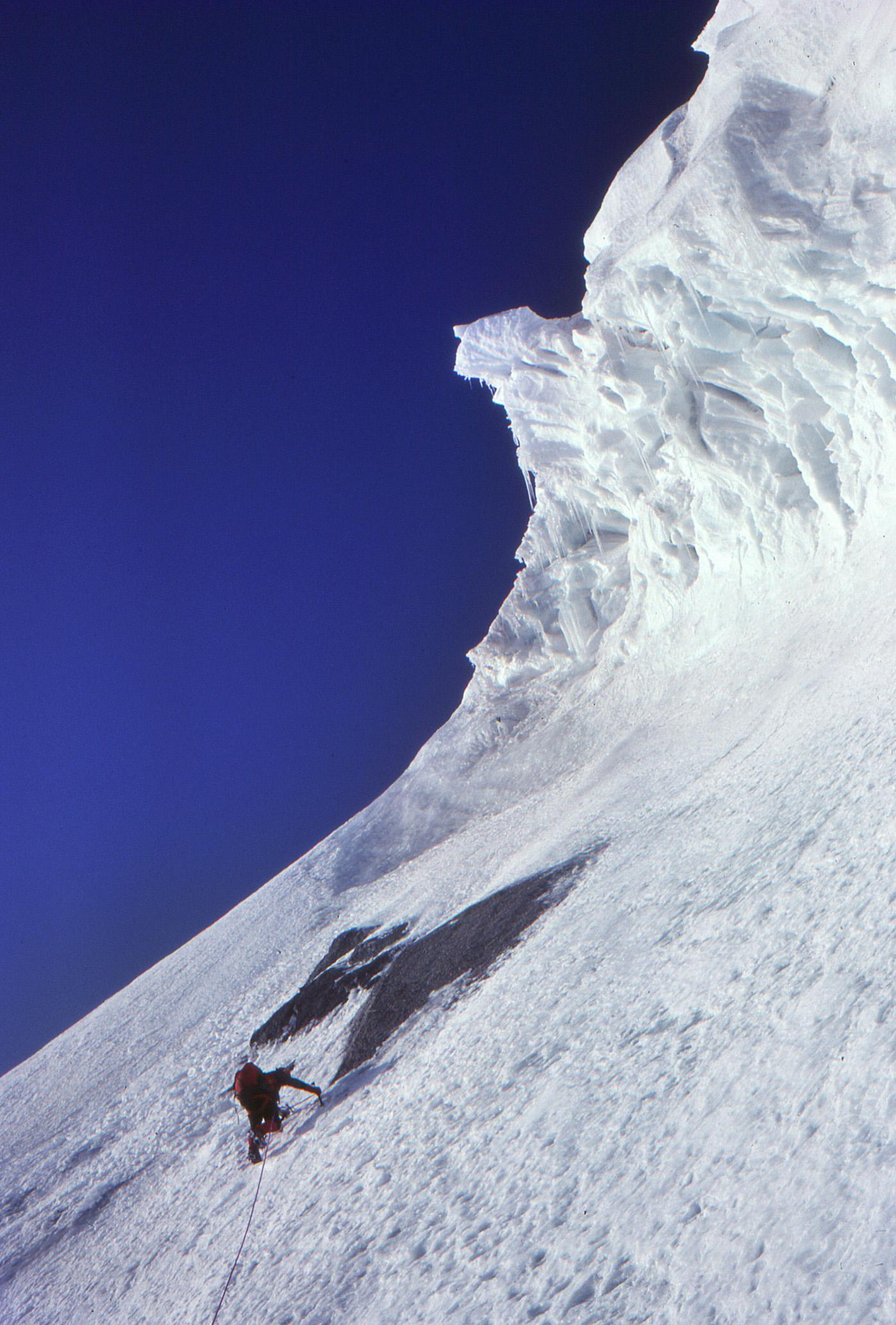
Alpinist crossing a large snow field underneath a dangerous hanging serac, on the Grand Pilier d'Angle.

Alpinists face a number of additional risks to the risks of rock climbing, ice climbing, and mixed climbing, making it one of the most dangerous forms of climbing. In 2019, Francis Sanzaro writing in the New York Times said of modern alpinism: "The routes are becoming more technically demanding, in more remote areas, and the method of "light and fast" — minimal gear, no fixed ropes, doing the route in a single push — is now regarded as the best style. These trends, and others, have made the sport of alpine climbing very, very dangerous". In 2021, the New York Times called the Piolets d'Or, alpine climbing's most important award, "A Climbing Award That May Be a Winner's Last", due to the number of fatalities of past winners.

Additional risks faced by alpinists to the risks of rock climbing, ice climbing, and mixed climbing, are:

- Rockfall. Alpine-type rock faces are in a perpetual state of erosion, which leads to periods of significant rockfall on various routes. The action of these rockfalls can be amplified by the couloirs that some alpine routes ascend. Climate change has increased this risk even further.

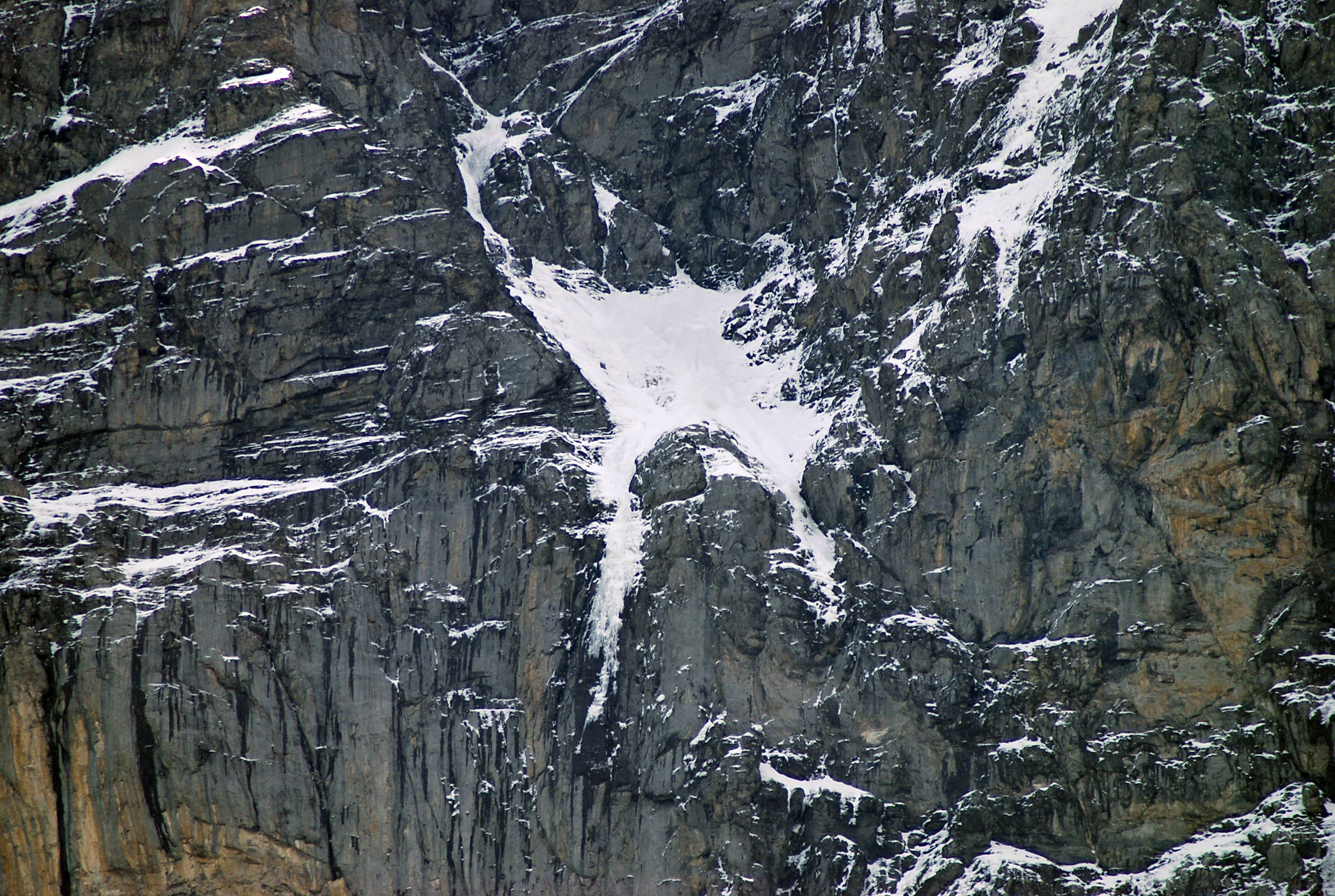
The deadly White Spider ice field on the north face of the Eiger into which avalanches and rockfalls are funneled from several directions; alpine climbers move through it as quickly as possible.

- Avalanche. Similarly to rockfall, alpinists face the risk of avalanches whose effects are also amplified by the couloirs some alpine routes ascend. In addition to encountering avalanches while on exposed alpine faces, they also encounter this risk when traveling to and from the routes. Alpinists such as David Lama, Jess Roskelley, Hansjörg Auer, and Marc-André Leclerc have been killed in such a fashion.
- Abseils. The completion of alpine climbs, or a retreat mid-route, can involve lengthy and complicated abseils for the descent. Descending major routes can require more than 20 abseils, carried out by tired climbers and often in poor conditions. A failure of any of these abseils can be fatal. The famous 1978 retreat from Latok I required 85 abseils; in 1977, Doug Scott famously broke both legs abseiling down Ogre I, but survived.
- Altitude. Alpine climbing is done at higher altitudes, and modern alpine climbing in the Himalayas and Patagonia is done at very high altitudes, including in the death zone. As alpinists need to carry their equipment, supplementary oxygen is usually not employed. High altitude not only brings the specific medical risks of AMS and edema but also increases the effects of dehydration and fatigue, and thus can lead to poor decision making that can have fatal consequences.
- Weather. Alpinists attempt bold and exposed routes – often on the dark north faces of mountains – at high altitudes where the weather is unstable. They don't carry the equipment to "wait out" storms. Retreats by alpinists in violent storms can be more dangerous than the route itself. One of the most famous examples is the 1936 Eiger climbing disaster, with the infamous image of alpinist Toni Kurz hanging from his frozen rope, unable to rescue himself.
- Glaciers and cornices. Alpinists usually need to travel over glaciers in getting to and from their routes, and can also encounter hanging glaciers on routes. Glaciers bring the risks of crevasses (including bergschrunds at the base of routes), and of large falling seracs, which is amplified by the need to travel on glaciers in the dark (an "Alpine start") to complete routes before the sun increases the risks of rockfall and avalanche. Many alpinists have been killed falling through cornices, including one of the most notable alpinists, Hermann Buhl.
- Navigation. Alpine routes are typically long and can follow complex paths through large mountain ridges and faces. A mistake in navigation or route finding, which can be exacerbated by poor weather, the effects of altitude, or the need to travel in the dark, can lead the climbers into situations that are fatal. It is not uncommon for alpinists to "go missing" on large routes; notable examples were the fatalities of Peter Boardman and Joe Tasker.
- Remoteness. Alpine climbs are in remote settings. Even in the European Alps, alpine climbers that get into difficulty can wait long periods before rescue is available or possible. Alpine climbers in the Himalayas and in Patagonia may take significantly longer periods to rescue, and for advanced and dangerous routes, rescue may simply not be possible without endangering the rescuers. In many cases, self rescue is the only option.

== Grading ==
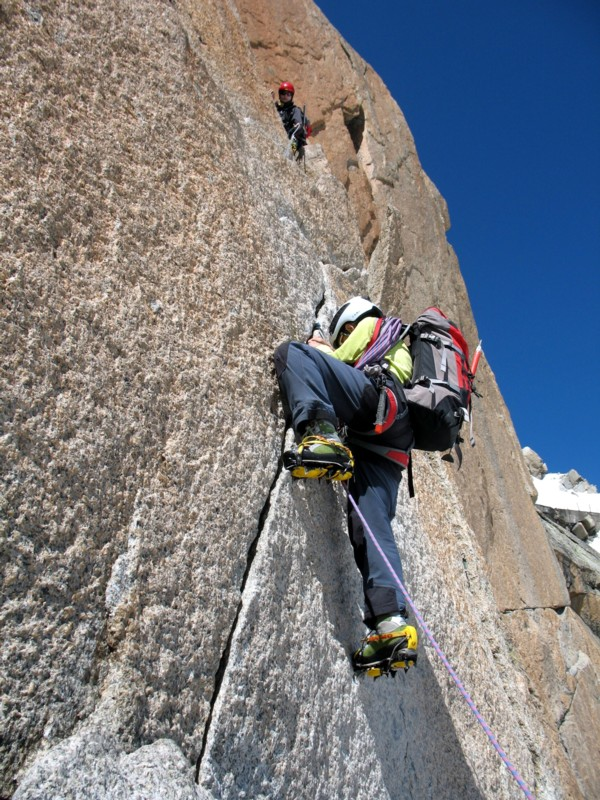
Cosmiques Ridge (AD, French 4c UIAA V, 300-metre), Aiguille du Midi.

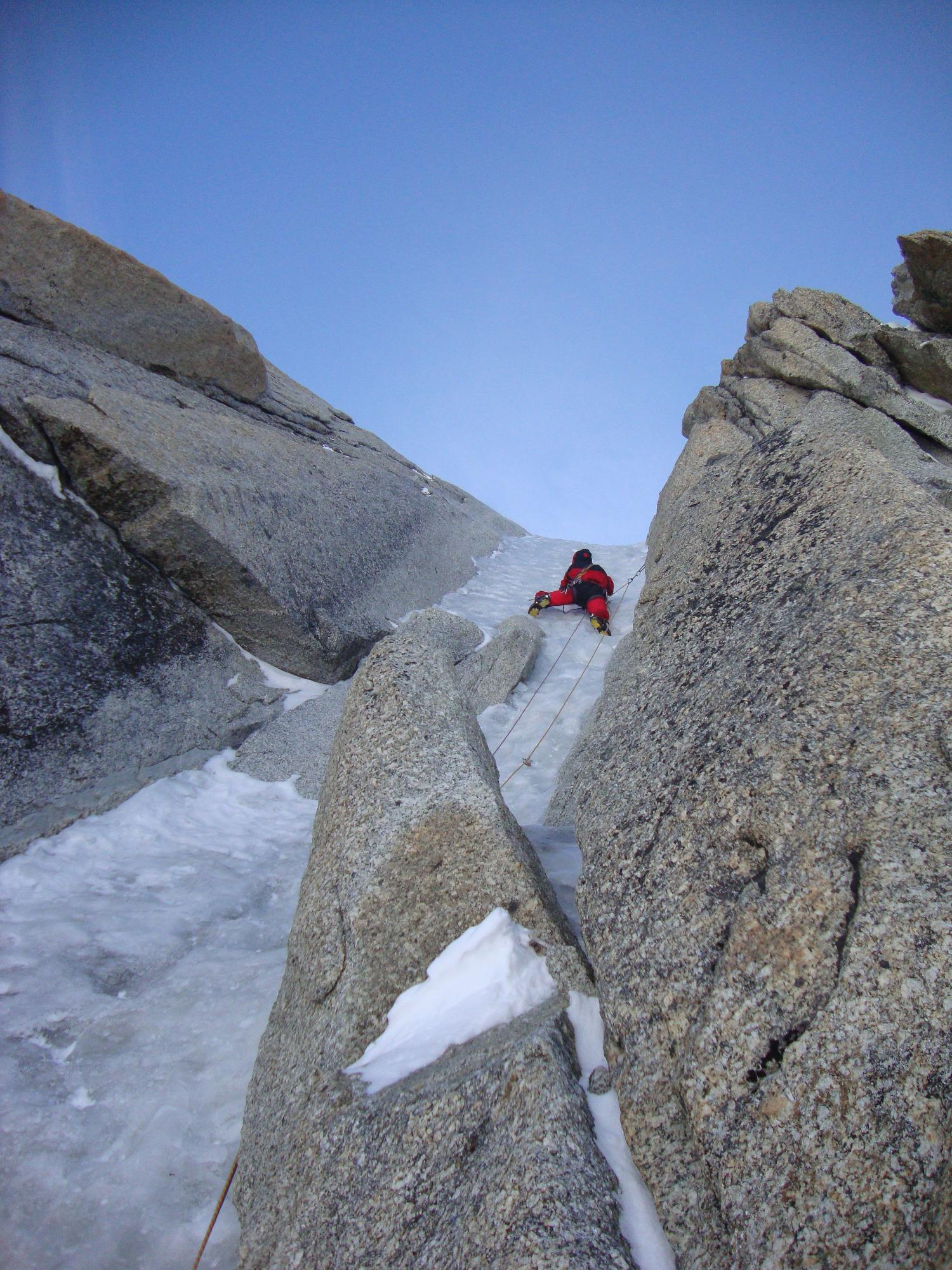
Chéré Couloir (D+, Ice WI4, Mix M3, 400-metre), Triangle du Tacul.

Due to the complexity of routes in alpine climbing, the "overall" grade denotes the general level of seriousness of the route to which is added additional specific grade(s) for any rock climbing (usually the French, American, or UIAA grades for free climbing, and the A-grade for aid climbing), ice climbing (the WI-grade), and mixed climbing (the M-grade) involved. In addition, alpine grades will quote the inclination of the main snow slopes encountered (e.g. 50–60 degrees), as these are often not graded ice climbs, but contribute significantly to the overall risk.

The most widely used "overall" grades are the acronyms of the UIAA Scale of Overall Difficulty, also known as the International French Adjectival System (IFAS). The UIAA warns against aligning their acronyms with equivalent rock and ice climbing grades, as the objective dangers can vary dramatically on routes with similar rock and ice climbing grades. For example, the famous 1,800-metre Eiger North Face 1938 Heckmair Route is graded ED2 even though the rock climbing is graded UIAA V− and the ice climbing is only at 60 degrees (i.e. both typically a D grade), due to the exceptional length and danger of the route. In spite of this, attempts have been made to ascribe a "typical" range of rock and ice climbing grades for to each acronym:

- F: facile (easy). Beginner climbing, possibly a glacial approach, with snow at an easy angle; little real rock or ice climbing, some scrambling.
- PD: peu difficile (slightly difficult). Novice alpine climbing. PD-/PD/PD+ routes have snow slopes up to 45 degrees, glaciers but no real ice climbing, can have easy rock climbing at grades 3a III to 3c IV.
- AD: assez difficile (fairly difficult). Intermediate alpine climbing with long pitches of fully roped climbing. AD-/AD/AD+ routes have sustained snow and ice at an angle of 45–65 degrees, with ice climbing at grade WI3, and rock climbing at grades 4a (5.4) IV+ to 4c (5.6) V.
- D: difficile (difficult). Hard and serious routes even for experienced climbers, can be long or short. D-/D/D+ routes have sustained snow and ice at an angle of 50–70 degrees, with ice climbing at grade WI4, and rock climbing at grades 5a (5.7) V+ to 5c (5.9) VI.
- TD: très difficile (very difficult). These routes are serious undertakings with high levels of objective danger. TD-/TD/TD+ routes have sustained snow and ice at an angle of 65–80 degrees, with ice climbing at grades WI5 to WI6, and rock climbing at grades 6a (5.10a) VI+ to 6c (5.11a/b) VII+.
- ED1/2/3/4... : extrêmement difficile (extremely difficult). Extremely hard, exceptional objective danger, vertical ice slopes with ice climbing at grades above WI6, and rock climbing at grades above 6c (5.11a/b) VII+; retreats may be extremely difficult in poor weather.

Note: A "+" (pronounced Sup for supérieur) or a "−" (pronounced Inf for inférieur) is placed after the acronym to indicate if a climb is at the lower or upper end of that grade (e.g., a climb slightly harder than "PD+" might be "AD−"). The term ABO for abominable is explicitly not recognized by the UIAA.

== Milestones ==
The following are the most notable milestones in alpine climbing (and latterly, alpine-style climbing as applied worldwide):

=== European Alps ===
- 1938. A team led by Anderl Heckmair completed the greatest prize in European alpine climbing, the first ascent of the north face of the Eiger. Even today, the 1938 Route (as it is known), carries a grade of ED2, due to its extreme danger beyond its technical grades of V A0 60-degree slopes.
- 1938–1949. Gaston Rébuffat became the first alpinist to complete the six great north faces of the Alps.
- 1955. Walter Bonatti completed a 5-day solo of a new route on the southwest face of the Petit Dru, which became known as the Bonatti Pillar, one of the hardest feats of alpine climbing at the time; much of the pillar fell off in 2005 and the route no longer exists.
- 1977–1978. Ivano Ghirardini became the first alpinist to climb the "Trilogy" in winter, and solo; Catherine Destivelle was the first female to complete the solo winter Trilogy in 1992–1994.

=== High Mountains in Asia (Himalayas, Karakoram, Hindu Kush, Pamir) ===
- 1975. Reinhold Messner and Peter Habeler made the first ascent of the Northwest Face of Gasherbrum I in pure alpine style; the first alpine-style ascent of an eight-thousander, which climbers previously believed could only be summited in expedition style.
- 1976. After 25 days of climbing, Peter Boardman and Joe Tasker summit the west wall of Changabang in alpine style; their integration of big wall climbing techniques was revolutionary. Boardman's account, The Shining Mountain, became a classic in mountain literature.
- 1977. A small team led by Doug Scott and Chris Bonington made the first ascent of The Ogre in pure alpine style; the descent turned into a struggle for survival as Scott and Bonnington were severely injured on the abseil; the ascent attracted worldwide interest for its boldness.
- 1978. After 26 days of climbing, a small team led by Jeff Lowe gets to within 500 feet of the summit Latok I via the north ridge in pure alpine style; the route would not be climbed until 2022 but Lowe's bold attempt increased worldwide interest in "pure alpine style" climbing.
- 1985. Wojciech Kurtyka and Robert Schauer traverse the Shining Wall of Gasherbrum IV. The cititation of Kurtyka's 2016 Piolet d'Or Lifetime Achievement award, called their climb the "most remarkable alpine style ascent of the 20th century".
- 2013. Ueli Steck soloed in pure alpine style the Lafaille Route on the enormous south face of Annapurna in just 28-hours, for which he won the 2013 Piolets d'Or; the provenance of the climb was initially questioned, but upheld by witnesses.

=== Patagonia ===
- 2021. Sean Villanueva O'Driscoll solos the Moonwalk Traverse, which is the enchainment of the 10 summits of the Cerro Chaltén Group, in Patagonia, for which he won the 2022 Piolet d'Or award, and was called one of the greatest alpine solos in climbing history.

== In film ==
A number of notable climbing films have been made about alpine climbing (and alpine climbing routes), including:

- The Alpinist, a 2021 documentary film about the late Canadian alpinist Marc-André Leclerc, featuring his ascent of Torre Egger
- Meru, a 2015 documentary film about the ascent of the Shark Fin's Route on Meru Peak in the Himalayas
- North Face, a 2008 German historical film about the 1936 Eiger climbing disaster
- Touching the Void, a 2003 docudrama about a famous alpine climbing rescue in the Peruvian Andes
- The Eiger Sanction, a 1975 fictional thriller film that involves an ascent of the north face of the Eiger

== See also ==
- Mixed climbing
- Ice climbing
- Rock climbing
- Glossary of climbing terms
