= Free Solo =

2018 film by Jimmy Chin and Elizabeth Chai Vasarhelyi

- Theatrical release poster
- Directed by: Elizabeth Chai Vasarhelyi; Jimmy Chin
- Produced by: Elizabeth Chai Vasarhelyi; Jimmy Chin; Evan Hayes; Shannon Dill
- Starring: Alex Honnold; Sanni McCandless; Jimmy Chin; Tommy Caldwell
- Cinematography: Jimmy Chin; Clair Popkin; Mikey Schaefer
- Edited by: Bob Eisenhardt
- Music by: Marco Beltrami; Brandon Roberts
- Production companies: National Geographic Documentary Films; Parkes+MacDonald Image Nation; Little Monster Films; Itinerant Media
- Distributed by: National Geographic Documentary Films; Greenwich Entertainment
- Release dates: August 31, 2018 (Telluride); September 28, 2018 (United States)
- Running time: 100 minutes
- Country: United States
- Language: English
- Budget: $2 million
- Box office: $29.4 million

Free Solo is a 2018 American documentary film directed by Elizabeth Chai Vasarhelyi and Jimmy Chin that profiles rock climber Alex Honnold on his quest to perform the first-ever free solo climb of a route on El Capitan, in Yosemite National Park in California, in June 2017.

The film premiered at the 45th Telluride Film Festival on August 31, 2018, and also screened at the 2018 Toronto International Film Festival, where it won the People's Choice Award in the Documentaries category. It was released in the United States on September 28, 2018, and grossed over $28 million at the worldwide box office. Free Solo received acclaim from critics and numerous accolades, including winning Best Documentary Feature at the 91st Academy Awards.

== Synopsis ==
Climber Alex Honnold has been dreaming of free-soloing the 3,000 feet (900 m) rock wall of El Capitan in Yosemite National Park, a feat no one has performed. His choice of big wall climbing route on El Capitan is called Freerider, a route that was created by Alexander Huber in 1998, and which Honnold has completed several times with protection equipment. Freerider is graded at 5.13a (7c+) in difficulty, and no climber has ever completed a big-wall free solo at such a grade of difficulty in rock climbing history.

Honnold is a shy loner who has lived and traveled alone in his van for several years, but recently he is sometimes joined by his new girlfriend Sanni McCandless. On one climb with McCandless, while she is feeding his rope through a grigri on his descent, she makes a mistake, and he falls, suffering some vertebral compression fractures. He considers breaking up with McCandless over the incident, but they remain together.

In the summer of 2016, Honnold and Tommy Caldwell go climbing in Morocco to prepare for his El Capitan free solo. The film crew also prepares, discussing where to place cameras to best capture Honnold’s climb while minimizing distractions and interference, and also the ethical dilemma of documenting this climb, knowing Honnold may die on camera. Honnold accepts an offer to receive a magnetic resonance imaging (MRI) scan in order to understand his brain's response to fear, and the results show that there is little activity in his amygdala in response to intense stimuli.

In the fall of 2016, Honnold sprained his ankle on El Capitan while traditional climbing (using ropes and protection equipment) on the first section of Freerider, the giant multi-pitch slab known as Freeblast and graded at 5.11b (6c). Not wanting to miss the chance to do the free climb that year, he only takes a brief break from climbing and resumes his preparations while his foot is still swollen. Around Halloween, Honnold and McCandless carve pumpkins with Caldwell and his wife and children. In an interview, Honnold says his family did not hug and the word "love" was not used in his household, as his father lacked the ability to form emotional bonds.

Honnold and Caldwell rappel down Freerider, and Honnold outlines his route, discussing the areas about which he is apprehensive. One section offers him two alternative pathways, which he calls "The Teflon Corner" (an internal right-angled section with a smooth slippery surface) and "The Boulder Problem" (a particularly intricate piece of the wall that has to be finished with either a jump or a wide "karate kick" stance). Both the crew and McCandless suggest abandoning the plan, and Honnold says he does not want his friends to see him die if he falls during the climb. News of the death of Swiss climber Ueli Steck, with whom he had climbed, causes Honnold to reflect on his own risk-taking, but Caldwell comments on how little it ultimately seemed to affect him. When he finally decides to try to free solo El Capitan, he abandons the attempt after the slab section of Freeblast, and filmmaker Jimmy Chin worries that the filming is putting unnecessary pressure on him.

After giving up on his plan to free solo El Capitan that season, Honnold and McCandless buy a house in Las Vegas. Then, on June 3, 2017, he again attempts a free solo climb of Freerider. McCandless leaves just before he starts, expressing her apprehensions in an interview. The film crew watches nervously as he makes his way through each of the most difficult parts of the climb, and one cameraman turns away several times, as he cannot bear to watch. Honnold completes the free solo in 3 hours and 56 minutes. He later does an interview with a journalist in which he contemplates his future, and the future of free solo climbing.

== Production ==
Prior to filming, directors Elizabeth Chai Vasarhelyi and Jimmy Chin struggled with the ethical ramifications and decisions behind creating Free Solo, knowing Honnold could die on camera. Ultimately, they decided to go through with the film and devoted some time to documenting its own production process, with Chin and his camera crew discussing the challenge of not endangering climber Alex Honnold by distracting him or putting any pressure at all on him to attempt the climb. According to Vasarhelyi, filming without endangering Honnold was achieved only thanks to careful planning and practice.

The production team captured 700 hours of footage using 12 cameras. This included camera operators on the ground, camera operators on the cliff face, remote trigger cameras, and a helicopter with a 1,000 mm lens to capture the 4k video. The camera operators were able to so effectively capture Honnold’s climb from different vantage points because they were all experienced climbers themselves. Wireless mics could not be used to record sound from Honnold due to his distance from the cameras, so the filmmakers created a special recording device and had Honnold carry it inside his chalk bag.

The film was made by National Geographic Partners, which at the time of the film's release was majority-owned by 21st Century Fox, with the remainder owned by the National Geographic Society.

Jimmy Chin in 2026

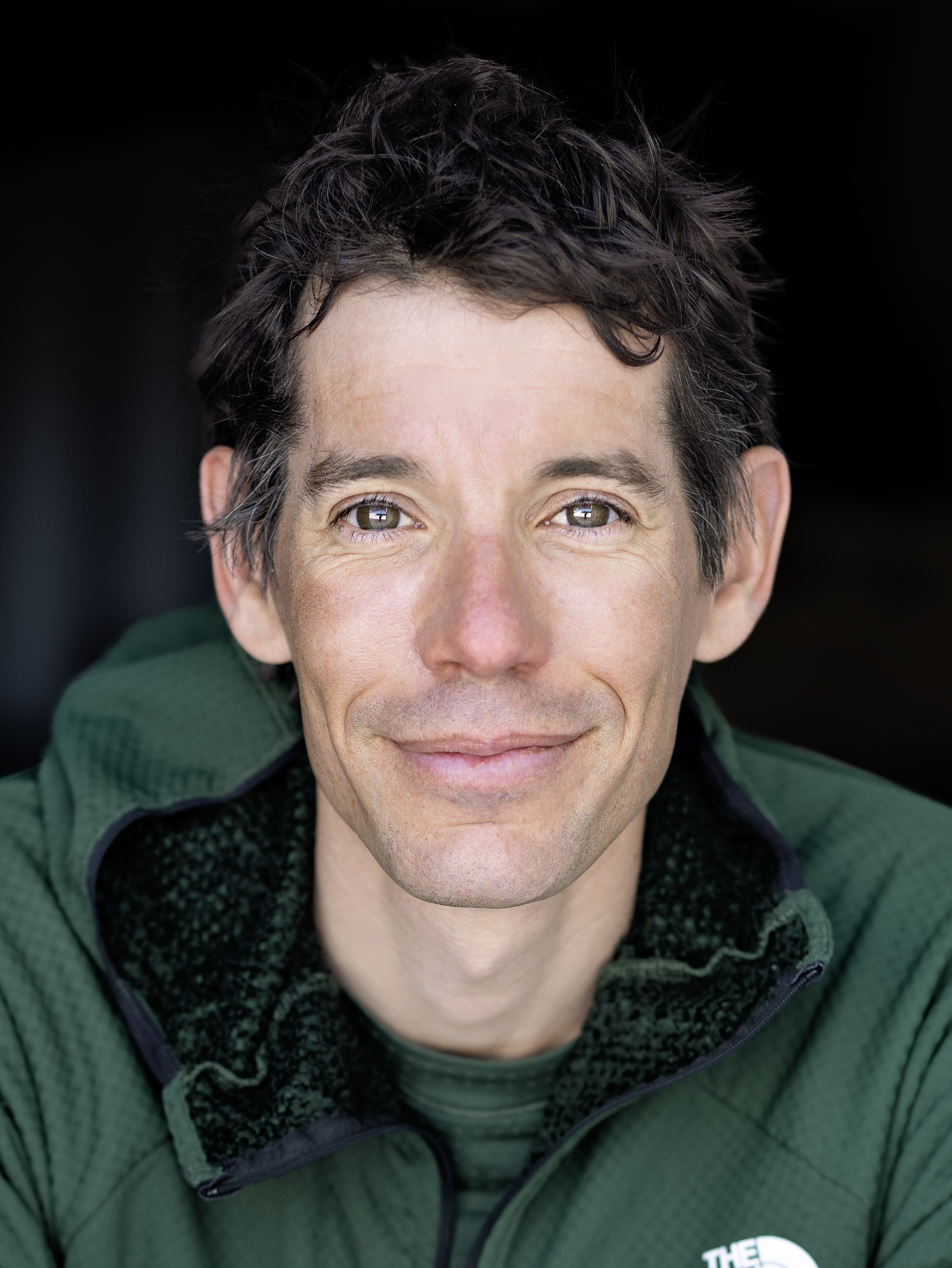
Honnold in 2023

== Release ==
Free Solo premiered on August 31, 2018, at the 45th Telluride Film Festival, and it was shown at multiple film festivals internationally, including at the 2018 Toronto International Film Festival on September 9, after that. It was released in theaters in the U.S. on September 28.

== Reception ==
=== Box office ===
The film grossed $17.5 million in the United States and Canada, and $11.1 million in other territories, for a total worldwide box office gross of $28.6 million.

Its opening weekend, Free Solo earned $300,804 from four theaters, its per-venue average of $75,201 surpassing both Eighth Grade for the highest per-venue average of 2018, and An Inconvenient Sequel (2017) for the highest-ever per-venue average for a documentary. The film expanded to 41 theaters its second weekend, earning $562,786, and then grossed $859,051 from 129 theaters its third weekend and $1 million from 251 theaters its fourth weekend. During its fifth weekend in theaters, the film earned $1.06 million from 394 theaters, bringing its total box office gross to over $5 million.

=== Critical response ===
On the review aggregator website Rotten Tomatoes, 97% of 159 critics' reviews of the film are positive, with an average rating of 8.2/10; the site's "critics consensus" reads: "Free Solo depicts athletic feats that many viewers will find beyond reason – and grounds the attempts in passions that are all but universal." On Metacritic, the film has a weighted average score of 83 out of 100 based on reviews from 25 critics, indicating "universal acclaim".

Peter Debruge of Variety praised the pacing of the film, saying: "Apart from a slow stretch around the hour mark, the filmmakers keep things lively (with a big assist from Marco Beltrami's pulse-quickening score, the nail-biting opposite of Tim McGraw's soaring end-credits single, "Gravity")." Richard Lawson of Vanity Fair called the film "bracingly made" and felt the filmmakers properly conveyed the challenges and dangers faced by Honnold in his endeavors: "Free Solo's detailed, transfixing portrait of their hero will at least show some sort of barrier to entry, communicating to those eager wannabes that very few people indeed are built quite like Alex Honnold. And thank goodness, in a way, for that."

Michael Hale of Sight and Sound praised the filming techniques and resulting effect, saying that an image reminiscent of Greek mythology is evoked as Honnold is captured scaling the immense wall of El Capitan. John Doyle of The Globe and Mail commended the "texture" of film, specifically the tension and intensity as Honnold repeatedly risks death, as well as the relatability of the scenes with Honnold and his girlfriend.

Sam Wollastan of The Irish Times wrote that the film effectively captures an amazing athletic feat, the emotional development of Honnold, and the budding romance between Honnold and McCandless. Jane Mulkerrins of The Times also praised this emotional development arc, remarking on the duality of the film as it examines Honnold's preparation and climb alongside his relationship with McCandless: "[Free Solo] captures the death-defying climb with vertigo-inducing camerawork. We see Honnold getting ready for the climb… At the same time, the armour of invincibility he's built up over the years fractures when he begins to fall in love with Sanni.”

=== Accolades ===
Award	Date of ceremony	Category	Recipient(s) and nominee(s)	Result	Ref.
Toronto International Film Festival	September 16, 2018	People's Choice Documentary	Free Solo	Won	
Hollywood Music in Media Awards	November 14, 2018	Original Score – Documentary	Marco Beltrami	Nominated	
Hollywood Music in Media Awards	November 14, 2018	Original Song – Documentary	Tim McGraw and Lori McKenna	Nominated	
Kendal Mountain Festival	November 17, 2018	Grand Prize	Free Solo	Won	
IDA Documentary Awards	December 8, 2018	Best Feature	Free Solo	Nominated	
IDA Documentary Awards	December 8, 2018	Best Cinematography	Jimmy Chin, Clair Popkin and Mikey Schaefer	Nominated	
Capri Hollywood International Film Festival	January 2, 2019	Best Documentary Feature	Free Solo	Won	
National Board of Review	January 8, 2019	Top 5 Documentaries	Free Solo	Won	
Cinema Eye Honors	January 10, 2019	Audience Choice Prize	Free Solo	Won	
Cinema Eye Honors	January 10, 2019	Outstanding Achievement in Cinematography	Jimmy Chin, Clair Popkin and Mikey Schaefer	Won	
Cinema Eye Honors	January 10, 2019	Outstanding Achievement in Original Music Score	Marco Beltrami	Nominated	
Cinema Eye Honors	January 10, 2019	Outstanding Achievement in Production	Free Solo	Won	
Producers Guild of America Awards	January 19, 2019	Outstanding Producer of Documentary Theatrical Motion Pictures	Elizabeth Chai Vasarhelyi, Jimmy Chin, Evan Hayes and Shannon Dill	Nominated	
Directors Guild of America Awards	February 2, 2019	Outstanding Directorial Achievement in Documentaries	Elizabeth Chai Vasarhelyi and Jimmy Chin	Nominated	
British Academy Film Awards	February 10, 2019	Best Documentary	Elizabeth Chai Vasarhelyi, Jimmy Chin, Shannon Dill and Evan Hayes	Won	
Satellite Awards	February 17, 2019	Best Documentary Film	Free Solo	Nominated	
Academy Awards	February 24, 2019	Best Documentary Feature	Elizabeth Chai Vasarhelyi, Jimmy Chin, Evan Hayes and Shannon Dill	Won	
Primetime Emmy Awards	September 14, 2019	Outstanding Creative Achievement in Interactive Media within an Unscripted Program	Free Solo	Won	
Primetime Emmy Awards	September 14, 2019	Outstanding Directing for a Documentary/Nonfiction Program	Elizabeth Chai Vasarhelyi and Jimmy Chin	Won	
Primetime Emmy Awards	September 14, 2019	Outstanding Cinematography for a Nonfiction Program	Jimmy Chin, Clair Popkin and Mikey Schaefer	Won	
Primetime Emmy Awards	September 14, 2019	Outstanding Picture Editing for a Nonfiction Program	Bob Eisenhardt	Won	
Primetime Emmy Awards	September 14, 2019	Outstanding Sound Editing for a Nonfiction Program (Single or Multi-Camera)	Deborah Wallach, Filipe Messeder, Jim Schultz, Roland Vajs and Nuno Bento	Won	
Primetime Emmy Awards	September 14, 2019	Outstanding Sound Mixing for a Nonfiction Program (Single or Multi-Camera)	Tom Fleischman, Ric Schnupp, Tyson Lozensky and Jim Hurst	Won	
Primetime Emmy Awards	September 14, 2019	Outstanding Music Composition for a Documentary Series or Special (Original Dramatic Score)	Marco Beltrami and Brandon Roberts	Won	

== See also ==
- The Alpinist, a 2021 documentary film about the late Canadian alpinist Marc-André Leclerc, featuring various free solo ice and alpine ascents.
- The Dawn Wall, a 2017 documentary film on Tommy Caldwell and Kevin Jorgeson's free climb of The Dawn Wall on El Capitan in Yosemite
- Meru, a 2015 documentary film on the ascent of the Shark's Fin route on Meru Peak
- Free Solo (soundtrack)
