= Big wall climbing =

Type of rock climbing

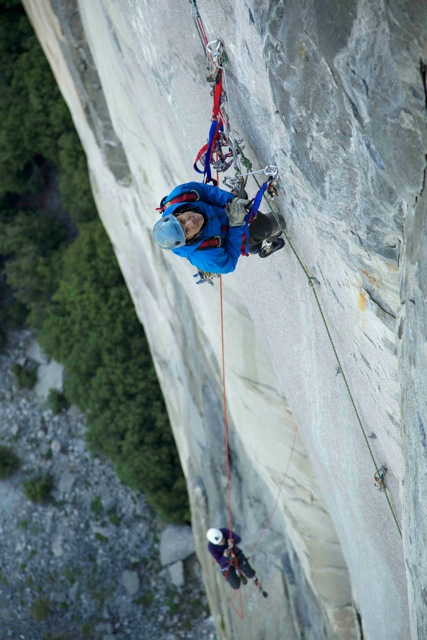
Big wall climbers on the route Zodiac (5.7 A2+ VI (aid), 5.13d VI (free), 16-pitches) on El Capitan, in Yosemite

Big wall climbing is a form of rock climbing that takes place on both very long and very sheer multi-pitch climbing routes – of at least 10 pitches or 300–500 metres (980–1,640 ft) in length – that require a full day, if not several days, to ascend. Big wall routes are sustained and exposed and the climbers typically remain suspended from the continuously sheer and vertical rock face, even hanging from the face when sleeping, with limited options to sit down or escape unless they abseil down the route—which is itself a complex and risky action. It is therefore considered a physically and mentally demanding form of rock climbing.

Big wall climbing is typically done by pairs of climbers using a traditional climbing style, but with the distinction that the non-lead climber usually ascends by jumaring up a fixed rope to save time and energy. It requires an extensive range of supplies and equipment over and above that of traditional-climbing that is carried in haul bags, such as portaledges, aid climbing equipment, poop tubes, and food and water. Big wall climbing also requires additional climbing techniques such as using pendulums/tension traversing, using aid climbing techniques, employing trail ropes, jumaring, and sometimes the technique of simul climbing.

Big wall climbing began in the Dolomites with pioneers such as Emilio Comici inventing many techniques and tools in the 1930s, and then spreading throughout the entire European Alps by climbers such as Riccardo Cassin and Walter Bonatti with his milestone solo ascent of the Dru in 1955. From the 1960s, American climbers led by Royal Robbins developed Yosemite into the world's most important big-wall climbing venue, with Lynn Hill's 1993 first free ascent of The Nose on El Capitan being an important milestone in big-wall history. High-altitude big-walls have been scaled in Patagonia and in the Himalayas.

== Description ==
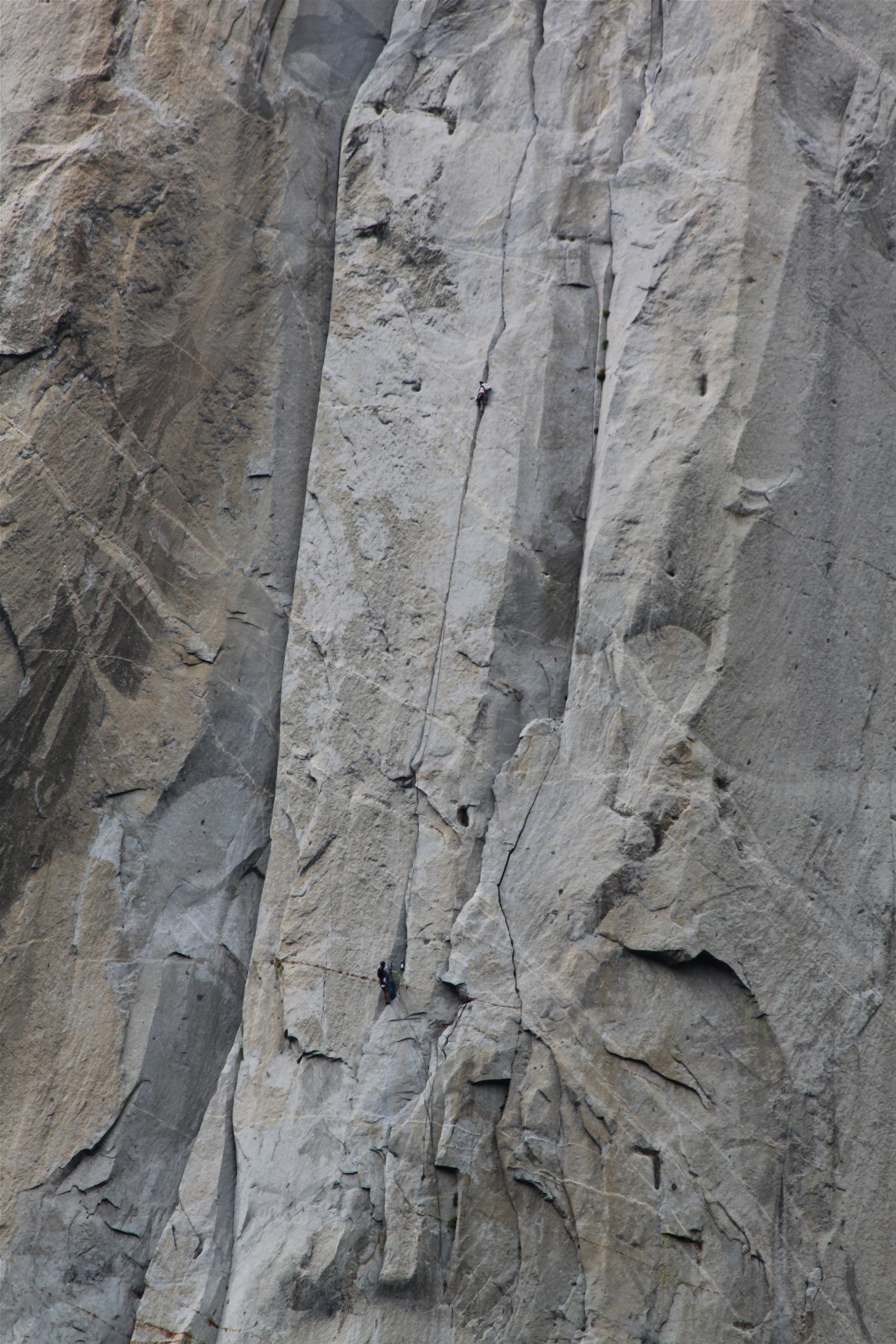
Climbers on a pitch of The Nose route (VI 5.9 C2) on El Capitan

Big wall climbing is rock climbing on large and very sheer / vertical climbing routes that often take a full day, if not several days, of continuous climbing to ascend. Big wall climbing is a form of multi-pitch climbing but there is no definition of how many pitches are needed for a route to be a big wall; a minimum of at least 6–10 pitches (or roughly 300–500 metres) is typically required. Big wall climbing is usually done in pairs as lead climbing, however, due to the length of the climbs, the second climber usually ascends via a fixed rope to save energy and time.

Big wall climbing can be performed as free climbing, however, it is common for big wall climbers to use some level of aid climbing on the route, as it is often impossible for very large multi-pitch routes to have a uniform level of difficulty (i.e. there may be some sections that are well beyond the difficulties of the rest of the route). Most big wall routes require traditional climbing techniques for climbing protection however some routes have bolted sections (or pitons) like sport climbing routes. Big wall routes have also been free solo climbed.

Big wall climbing routes are typically sustained (due to them being continuously sheer) and exposed, where the climbers are suspended from the rock wall during their entire ascent with limited availability to sit down (e.g. few large ledges), or to escape from the wall other than by abseiling back down the entire route (which can be itself a risky process). Big wall climbing is thus a more serious undertaking than regular multi-pitch rock climbing, and climbers will generally only attempt big wall routes at grades that they can easily manage as multi-pitch routes.

The duration and sustained exposure of big wall climbs require greater equipment—and equipment-handling skills—over and above what is required for multi-pitch routes. Big wall climbers need to be able to haul gear and supplies up the route as they climb (using pulleys and haul bags), ascend on fixed ropes (the non-leading climber), build major anchor points (for hanging belays), hammer-in bolts and pitons as required, and set up portaledges for resting and sleeping. Given the length of the routes, this must happen efficiently.

== Notable walls ==
Notable big walls

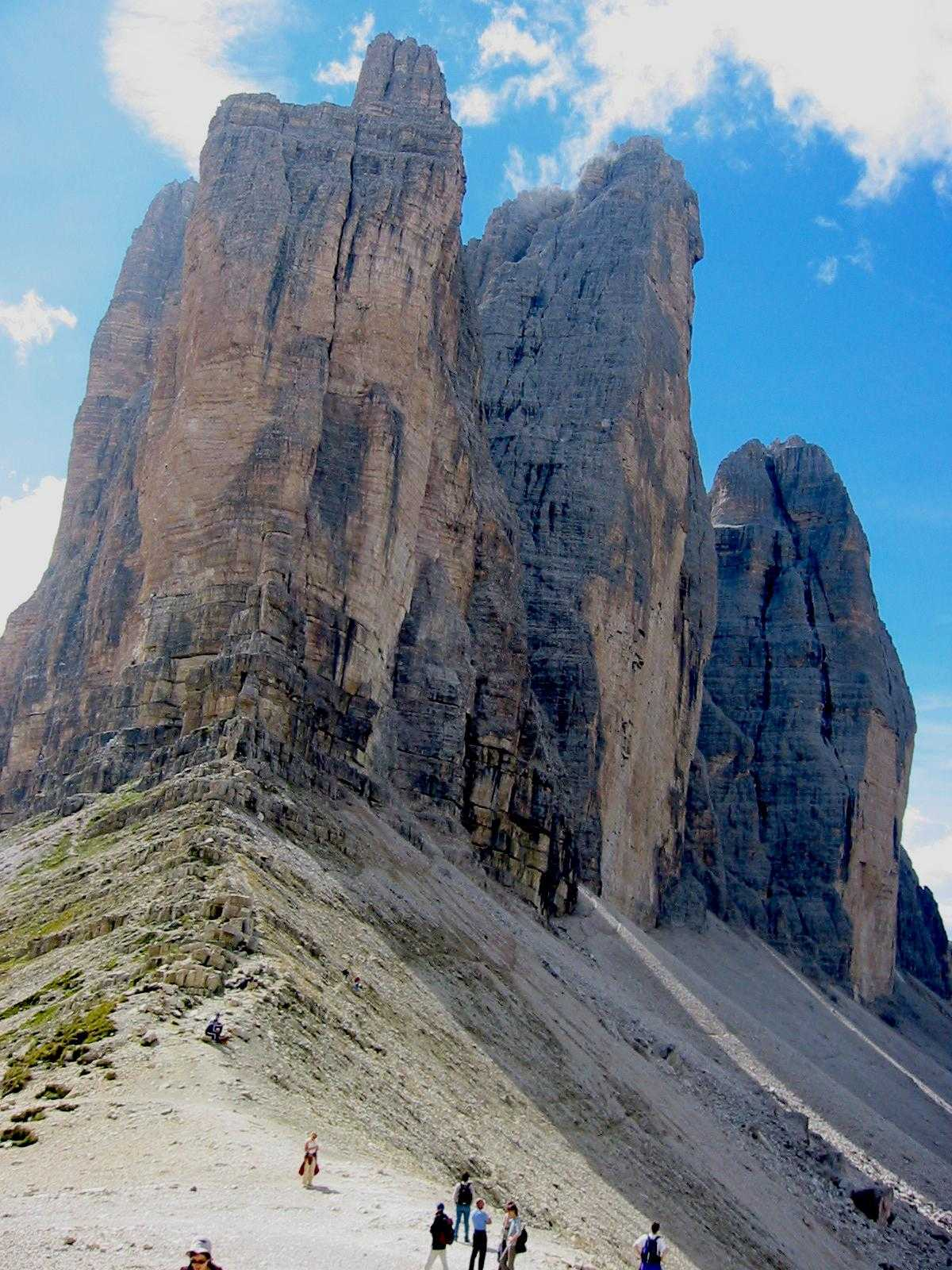
Tre Cime di Lavaredo

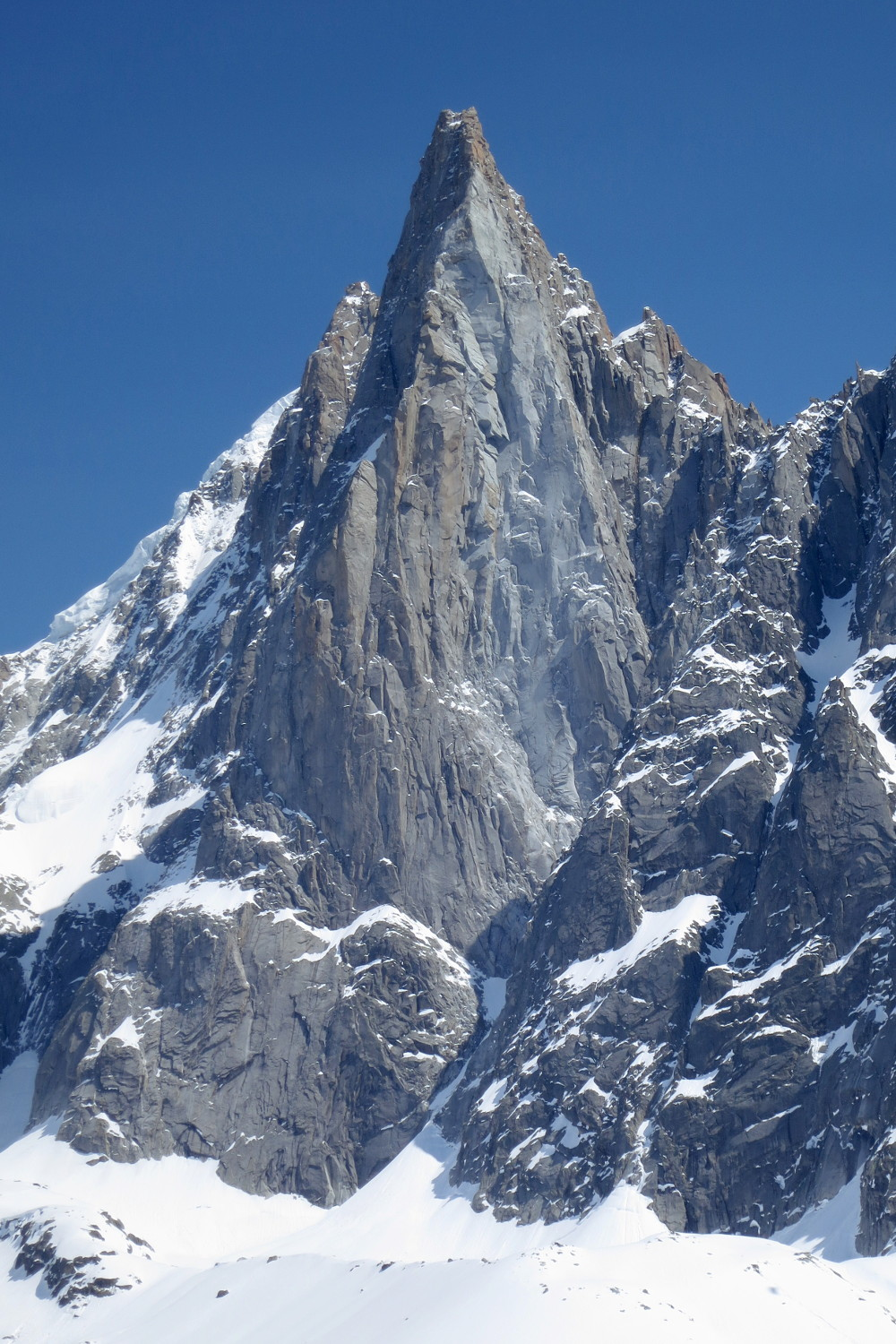
Petit Dru

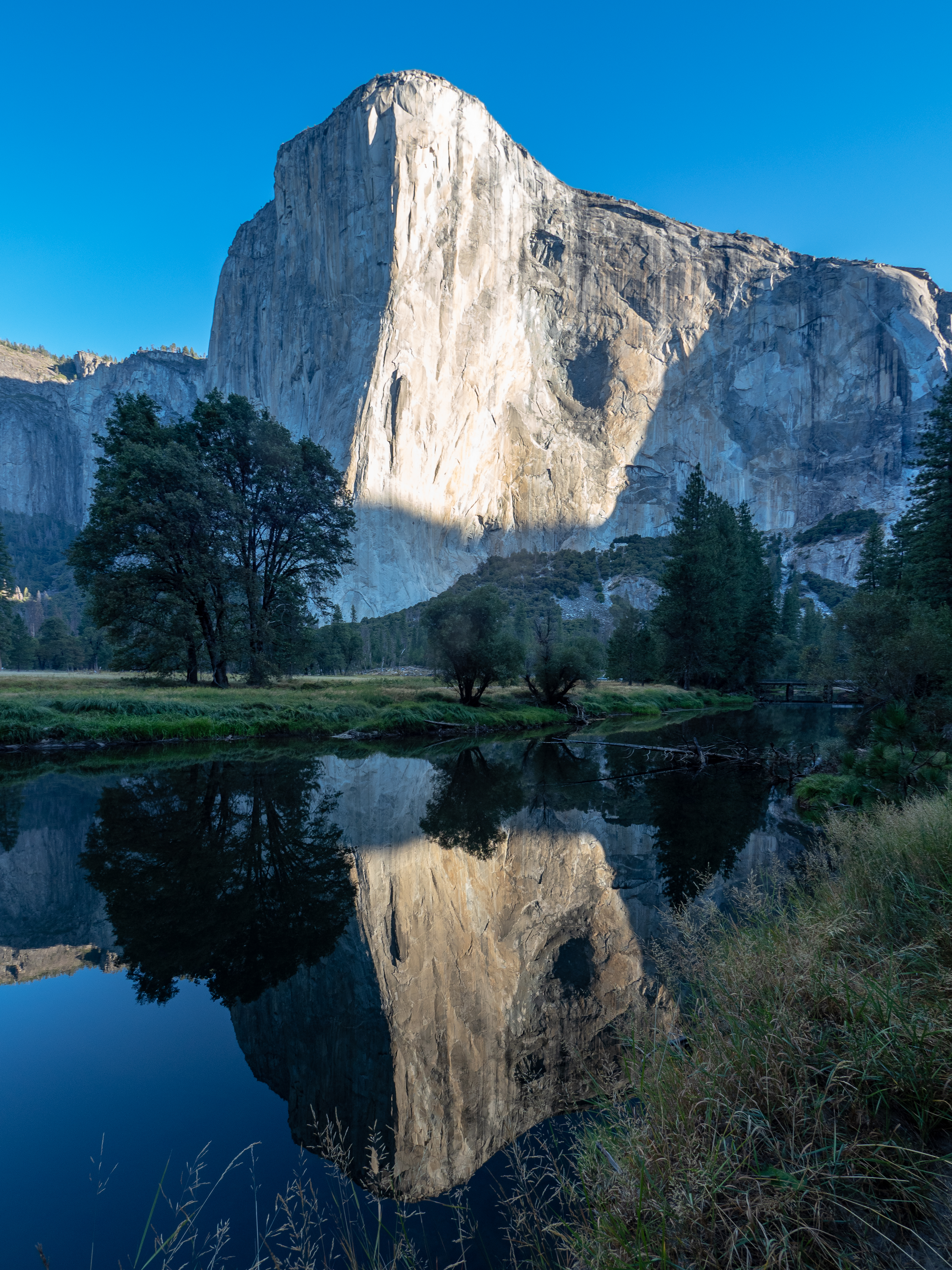
El Capitan

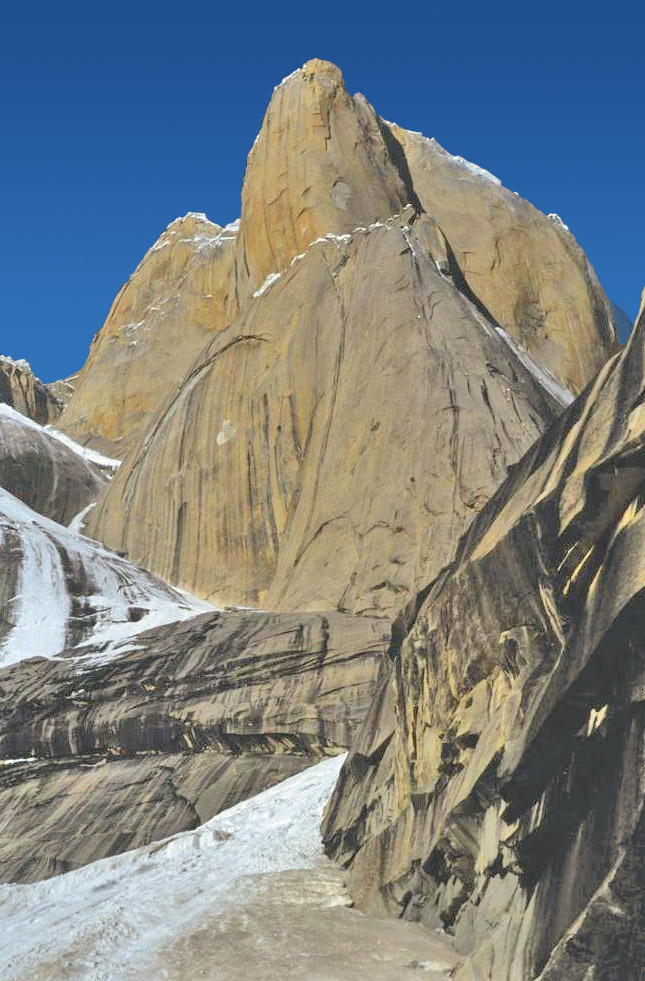
Great Trango Tower

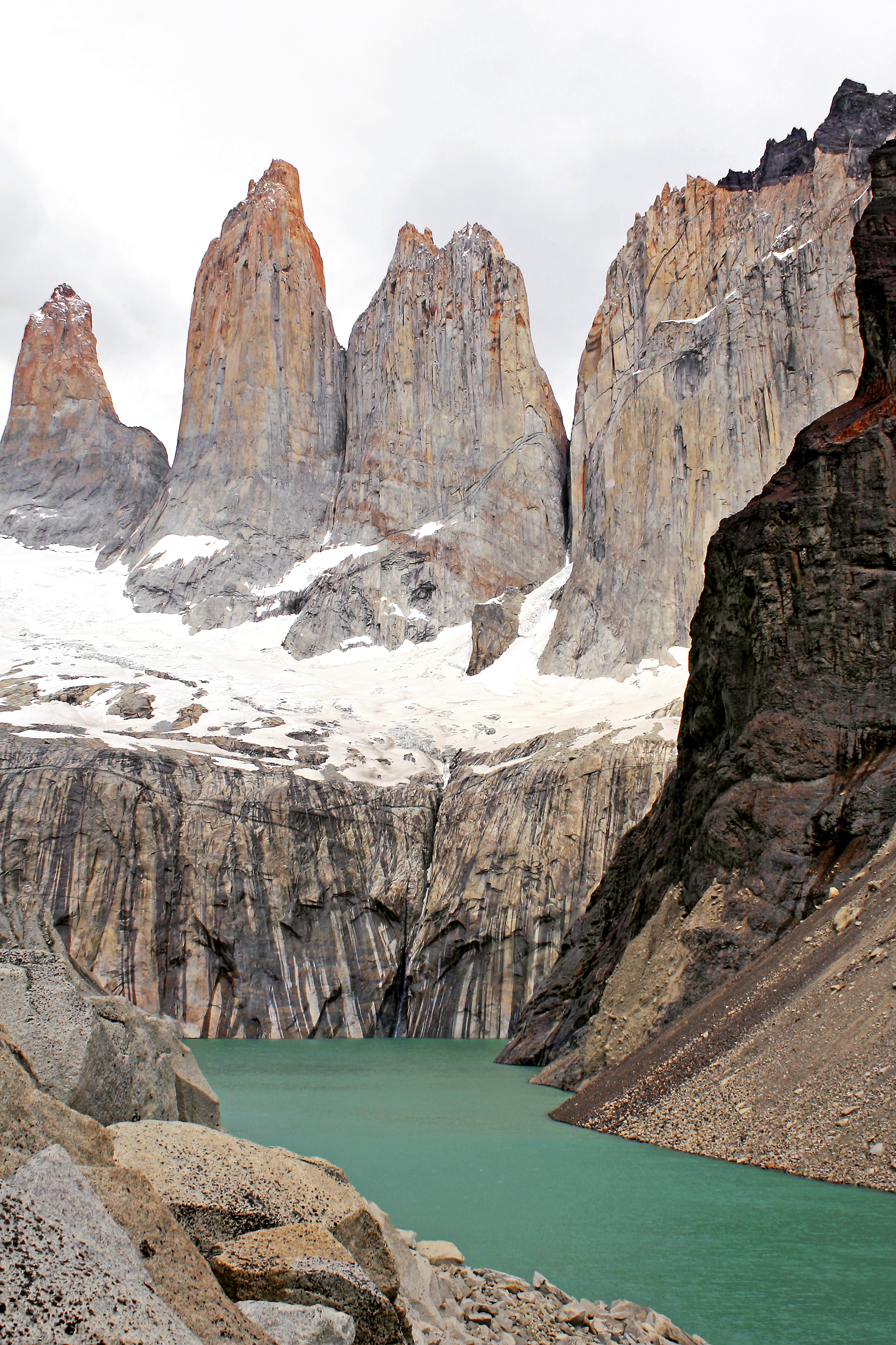
Cordillera Paine

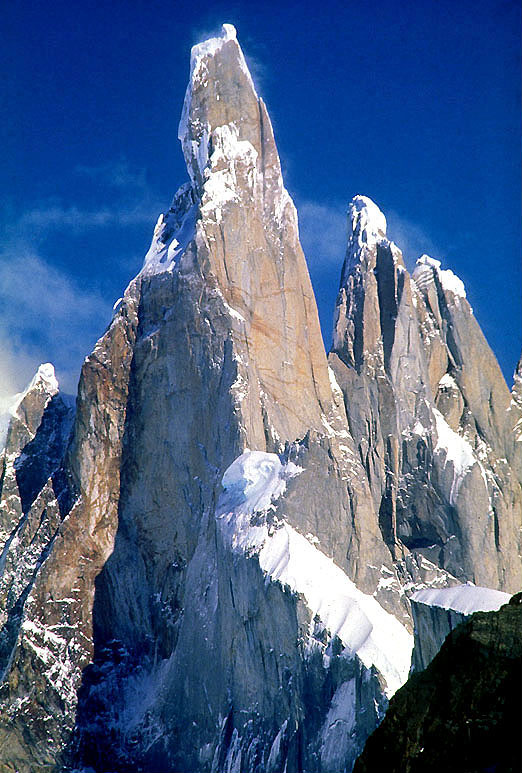
Cerro Torre

In determining what is a "big wall", there is not only debate about the height requirements but also on whether it includes alpine climbs such as the north faces of the Eiger and the Matterhorn, which also have a lot of snow and ice. Regardless, a number of walls are considered particularly notable in the development of big-wall climbing:

- Tre Cime di Lavaredo, Dolomites. The Dolomites were the birthplace of big wall climbing where many important early tools and techniques were developed, and the scene of many milestones by pioneers such as Emilio Comici and Riccardo Cassin, and modern milestones in big wall free and solo climbing by Alexander Huber.
- Petit Dru, Mont Blanc Massif. An important big wall in the heart of one of Europe's most important alpine climbing venues; the Dru was the scene of several milestones in big-wall climbing including Walter Bonatti's groundbreaking 1955 solo ascent of the eponymous Bonatti Pillar and Catherine Destivelle's 1991 solo of the eponymous Voie Destivelle.
- El Capitan and Half Dome, Yosemite. The world's most famous big wall venue, and where many techniques, tools, and grade milestones were developed in big wall climbing by pioneers such as Royal Robbins and Warren Harding in the 1960s and 1970s; Lynn Hill's 1993 first free ascent of The Nose was one of the greatest milestones in big wall climbing; Tommy Caldwell's 2015 milestone in freeing the Dawn Wall, and Alex Honnold's 2017 milestone in big wall free soloing attracted global attention.
- Trango Towers, Karakoram. The Great Trango Tower's east face and east buttress form the world's longest big wall climbs, and was the birthplace of high-altitude big wall climbing; the towers, including the adjoining Nameless Tower, are considered formidable and dangerous due to their extreme altitude, and include famous big wall routes such as Eternal Flame (650-metres, 24-pitches, VI 5.13a), and The Grand Voyage (1,340-metres, 33-pitches, VII 5.10 A4+), the world's largest vertical route.
- Mount Asgard and Mount Thor, Baffin Island. In the early 1970s, British big wall climber Doug Scott highlighted the enormous range and scale of big wall climbing possibilities on Baffin Island, and it has been a focus of big wall climbers ever since.
- Cordillera Paine, Chilean Patagonia. Developed by British and Italian climbers in the early 1960s, the windswept towers have been a continuous venue for big wall climbing with the world's leading big wall climbers still trying to fully free the famous 1991 partially-aided route by Wolfgang Gullich and Kurt Albert, Riders on the Storm (VI, 5.13/7c+, A3).
- Cerro Torre and Fitz Roy, Patagonia. Cerro Torre is one of the most iconic big walls but also one of the most controversial as a result of Cesare Maestri's dubious 1959 ascent (disproven in 2015), and his 1970 densely-bolted Compressor Route (bolts removed in 2012); its neighbor Fitz Roy also has iconic big wall routes, and both have attracted climbers doing grand-traverses (or enchainments) of their multiple towers.
- Ulvetanna Peak, Queen Maud Land, Antarctica. Considered the "last frontier" in big wall climbing, its huge rock faces have attracted the continuous attention of some of the world's best contemporary big wall climbers who continue to develop new routes in the location.

In addition to the above big walls, several other locations are regarded as having impressive big walls that have been climbed. However, their level of challenge — often due to the variable or poor quality of the underlying rock face — has not been as notable in the development of big wall climbing, and they are no climbed as frequently as the above walls. They include Troll Wall (Norway), Cerro Autana (Venezuela), Naranjo de Bulnes (Spain), Tsaratanana Massif (Madagascar), Potrero Chico (Mexico), Ketil (Greenland), and Notch Peak and The Streaked Wall (Utah).

== History ==
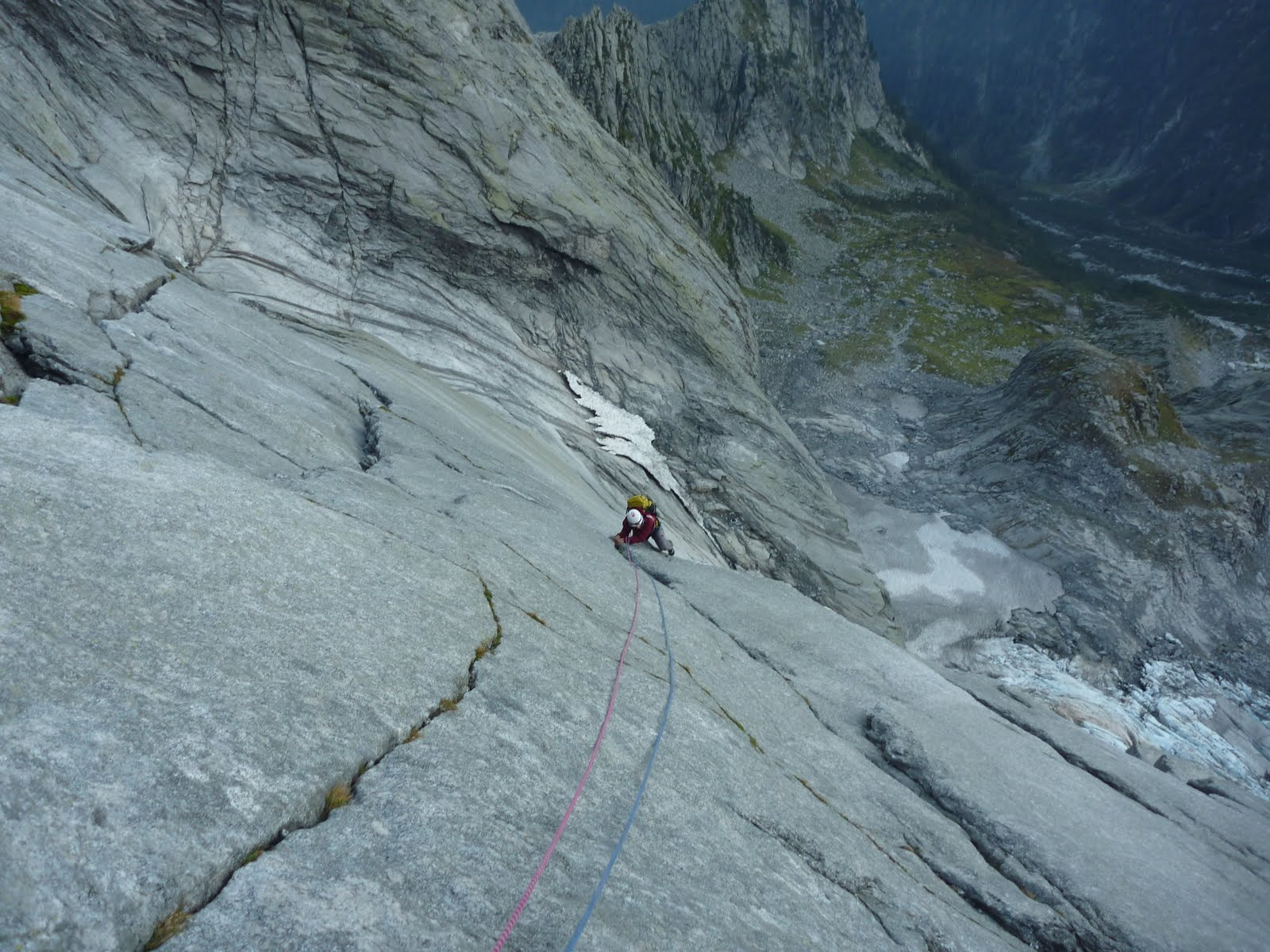
Climber on the Cassin Route on Piz Badile, which is 850-metres, 25-pitches, and graded TD (IFAS), 5.9 (American), 5c (French), VI- (UIAA), IV (NCCS).

One of the earliest examples of "big wall climbing" dates from 1887 when a 17-year-old Georg Winkler free soloed the Vajolet Towers in the Dolomites. The Dolomites were the birthplace of big wall climbing, and where pioneer Emilio Comici invented many big wall techniques such as aid climbing with multi-step aiders, hanging belays and bivouacs, advanced rope maneuvers, and leading with a trail rope. In 1933, Comici climbed the overhanging north face of the Cima Grande, then the world's hardest big wall route. Other pioneers such as Riccardo Cassin, a leading alpinist, created harder routes and spread big wall techniques across the Alps. In 1955, Walter Bonatti ushered in modern big wall climbing with his six-day solo of a new route on the southwest pillar of the Petit Dru, one of the most important big wall climbs in history.

In 1957, a team led by Royal Robbins climbed the Northwest Face of Half Dome in Yosemite, ushering in modern American big wall climbing. In 1958, a team led by Warren Harding aid climbed The Nose on El Capitan using siege tactics (600 pitons and 125 bolts) over 47 days; while the ascent got worldwide recognition it was controversial due to the excessive use of aid. Robbins' ethos of minimizing the use of aid prevailed over that of Harding, and his legacy of partially aided ascents including the Salathé Wall (1961), the North American Wall (1964), and the Muir Wall (1968) cemented Yosemite, and the granite walls of El Capitan, as the world's most important big wall climbing venue and Robbins' place in big wall history.

The development of big wall techniques and tools in the European Alps and Yosemite led to a worldwide search for new big walls. In 1963, a team led by Chris Bonington established the first big wall routes on the Cordillera Paine, Chile and Patagonia, followed closely by new Italian-led routes. In 1972, Doug Scott, and later Charlie Porter, developed big wall routes on Mount Asgard, and highlighted the enormous big wall potential of Baffin Island. In 1976, a British team led by Joe Brown ascended one of the first-ever high-altitude big wall routes with the granite Trango (Nameless) Tower in the Karakoram, which was followed in 1992 by the two-man team of John Middendorf and Xaver Bongard who ascended the east buttress of the neighboring Great Trango Tower, putting up The Grand Voyage (1,340-metres, 33-pitches, VII 5.10 A4+), the longest big wall route in the world.

Starting about 1910, leading climbers began to fully free-climb major big wall routes. Tita Piaz, Hans Dülfer, Emil Solleder, Gian Battista Vinatzer, Mathias Rebitsch and Frank Sacherer were the most prominent in their respective generations. In 1988, Todd Skinner and Paul Piana freed the Salathe Wall on El Capitan at 5.13b (8a). In 1989, Wolfgang Gullich, with others, established the mega-route Eternal Flame on Nameless Tower (fully freed by the Hubers in 2009), and in 1991, created Riders on the Storm on the Torres del Paine. In 1993, Lynn Hill claimed one of the greatest prizes in big wall climbing by freeing The Nose on El Capitan at 5.14a (8b+). In 2001, Alexander Huber freed Bellavista on the Cima Ovest at 8c (5.14b). In 2015, Tommy Caldwell and Kevin Jorgeson freed Dawn Wall on El Capitan at 5.14d (9a). During this era, new milestones were also set in big-wall free solo climbing by Alexander Huber, with Brandler-Hasse Direttissima on the Cima Grande in 2012 at 7a+ (5.12a), by Hansjörg Auer, with Fish Route on the Marmolada in 2007 at 7b+ (5.12c), and by Alex Honnold with Freerider on El Capitan in 2017 at 7c+ (5.13a).

== Equipment ==
Equipment used on big wall climbs

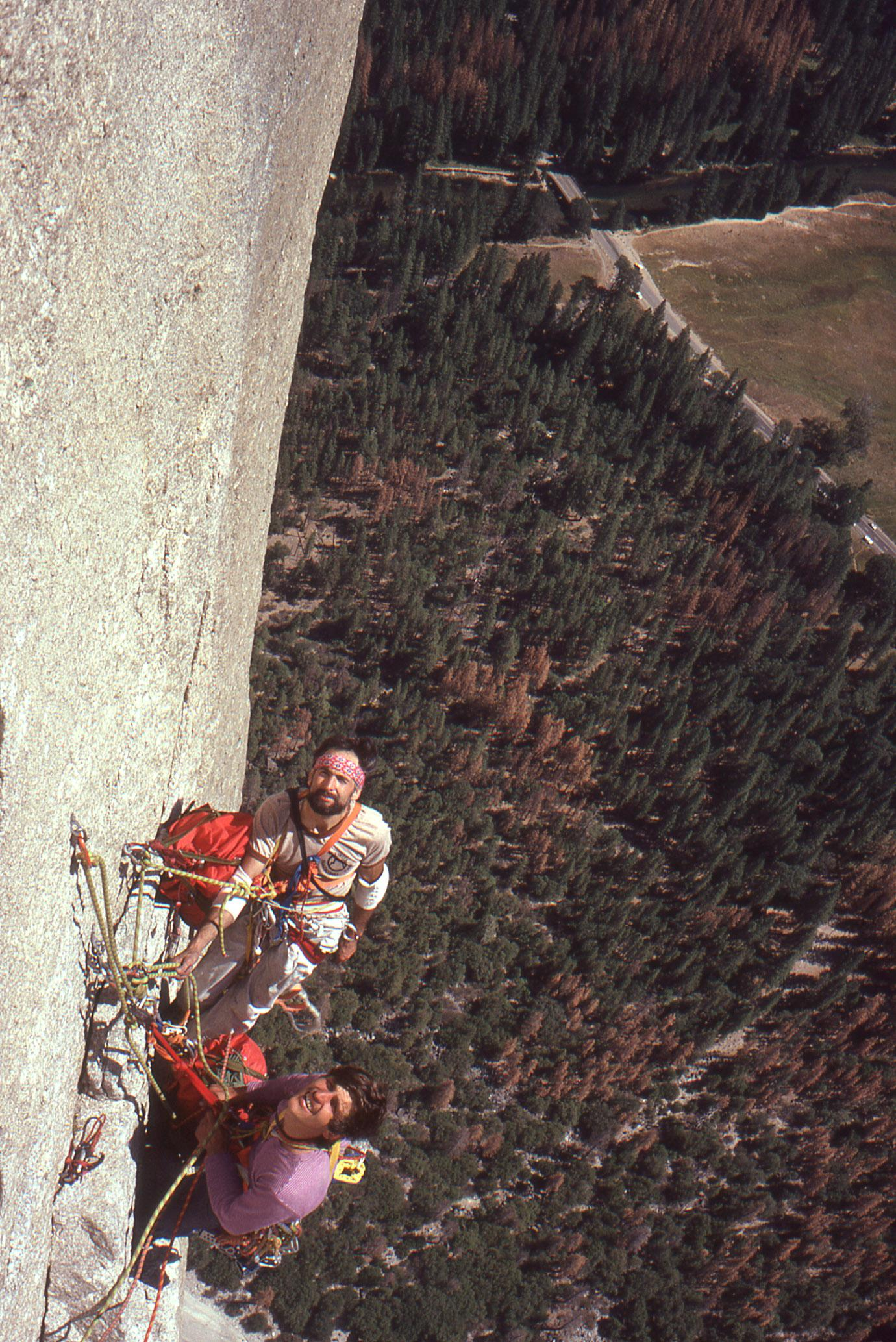
Anchor point for a hanging belay

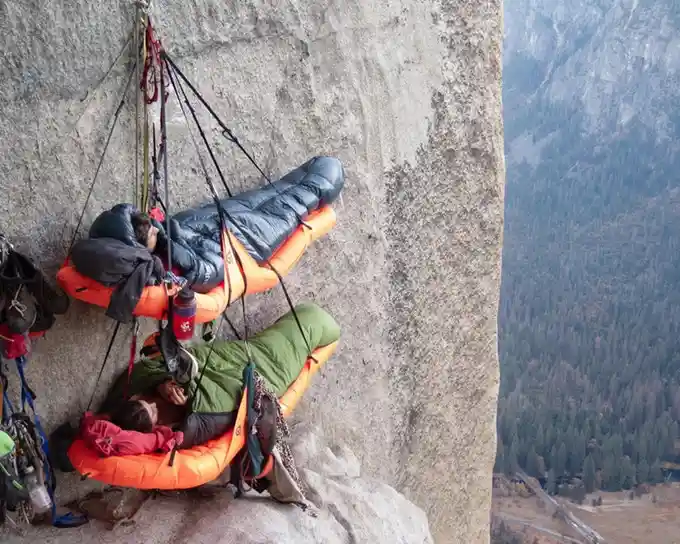
Anchor point for setting up an overnight camp

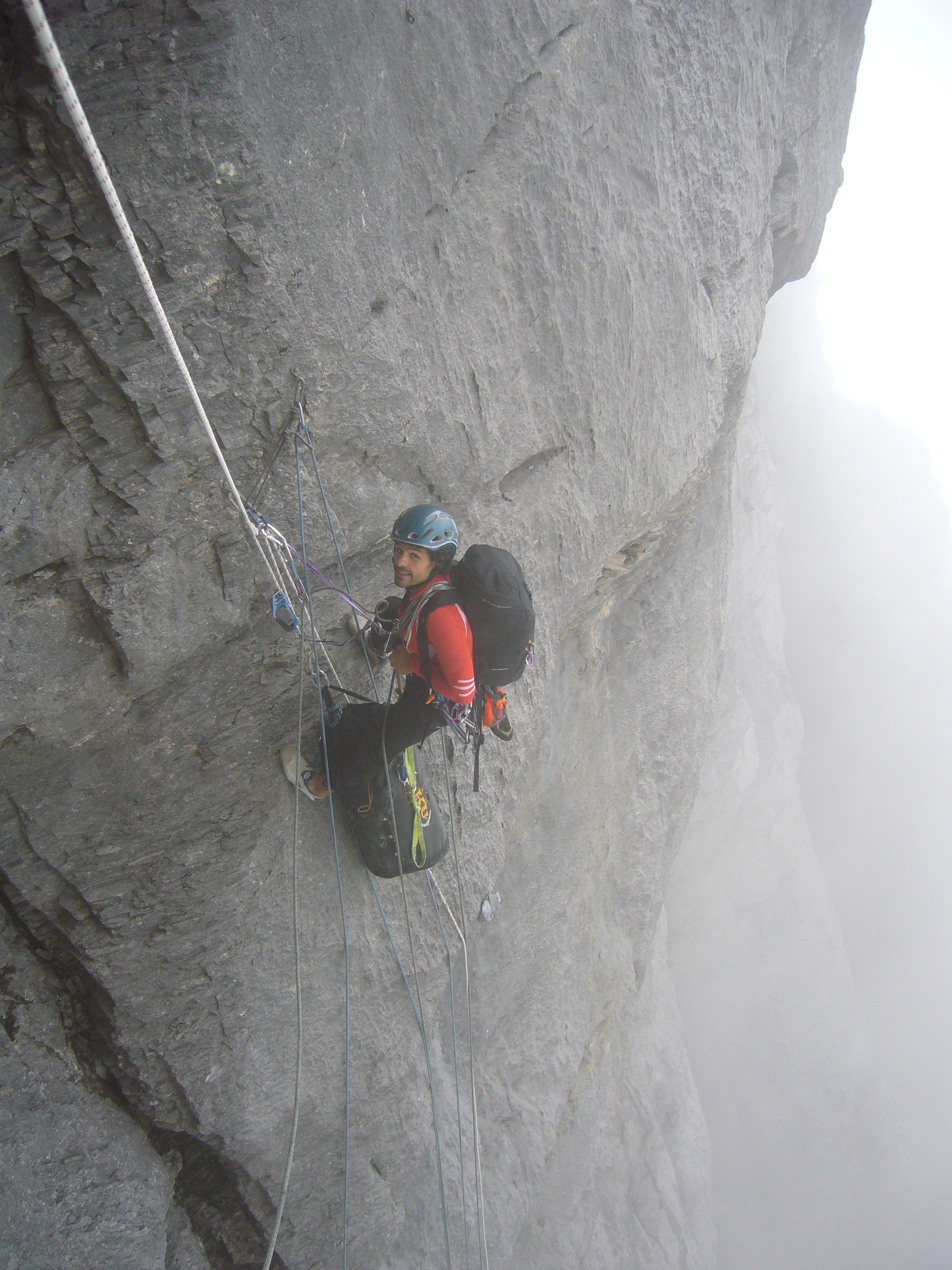
Ascending a static rope with haul bag

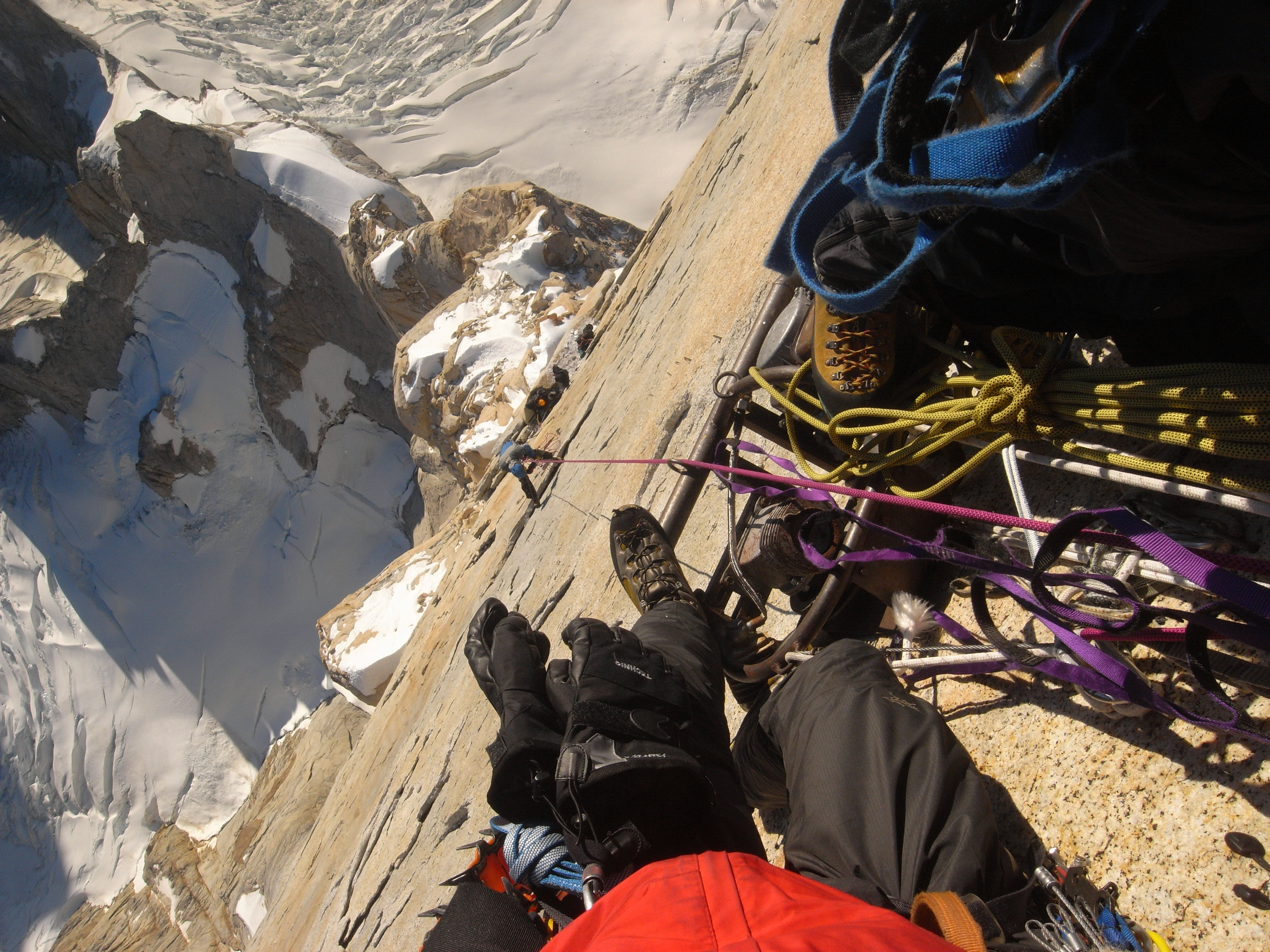
Second-climber jumaring up a static rope to the lead-climber

Big wall climbing requires the equipment used in traditional climbing and multi-pitch climbing (but in greater volume as the pitches are of fuller length), as well as specific additional items that are needed for extended multi-day muti-pitch big wall routes, including:

=== Aid-climbing equipment ===
Many big wall climbers carry a set of aid climbing equipment including aiders, daisy chains, pitons (and also angles, knifeblades, copperheads and even bolt kits), a hammer, hooks (and also skyhooks, talon hooks, cam hooks), prusiks, fifi hooks and a chest harness/gear sling. This is because some aid techniques may be required (see Techniques).

=== Anchor equipment ===
The sustained and exposed nature of big walls requires secure anchor points. These can be for creating temporary camps (e.g. from which portledges are suspended), but also for setting up hanging belay systems (including a bosun's chair for comfort), and strong-points for long and complex abseils, pendulums, or tension-traverses (see Techniques).

=== Fixed and static ropes ===
A distinctive aspect of big wall climbing is the need for extra-long 60–70-metre (200–230 ft) fixed or static ropes that are in addition to the standard dynamic ropes (which will also be extra long for big walls) that are used in all lead climbing. Static ropes are used by the non-lead climber to ascend the route using ascenders (i.e. jumaring), while lighter and thinner non-climbing static trail ropes are also used by both climbers to haul up equipment at the end of each pitch, and also to pass equipment between them while climbing (they are not strong enough for climbing).

=== Food and water ===
Water is one of the heaviest elements that the climbers have to carry, and big walls typically require circa 3-4 liters per day per person to be hauled along the route. Mistakes due to dehydration in the sustained and serious environment of big wall climbing can have serious outcomes. Climbers will also need food/energy provisions to sustain them for the ascent, including any unforeseen delays (e.g., getting trapped in bad weather).

=== Other specific items ===
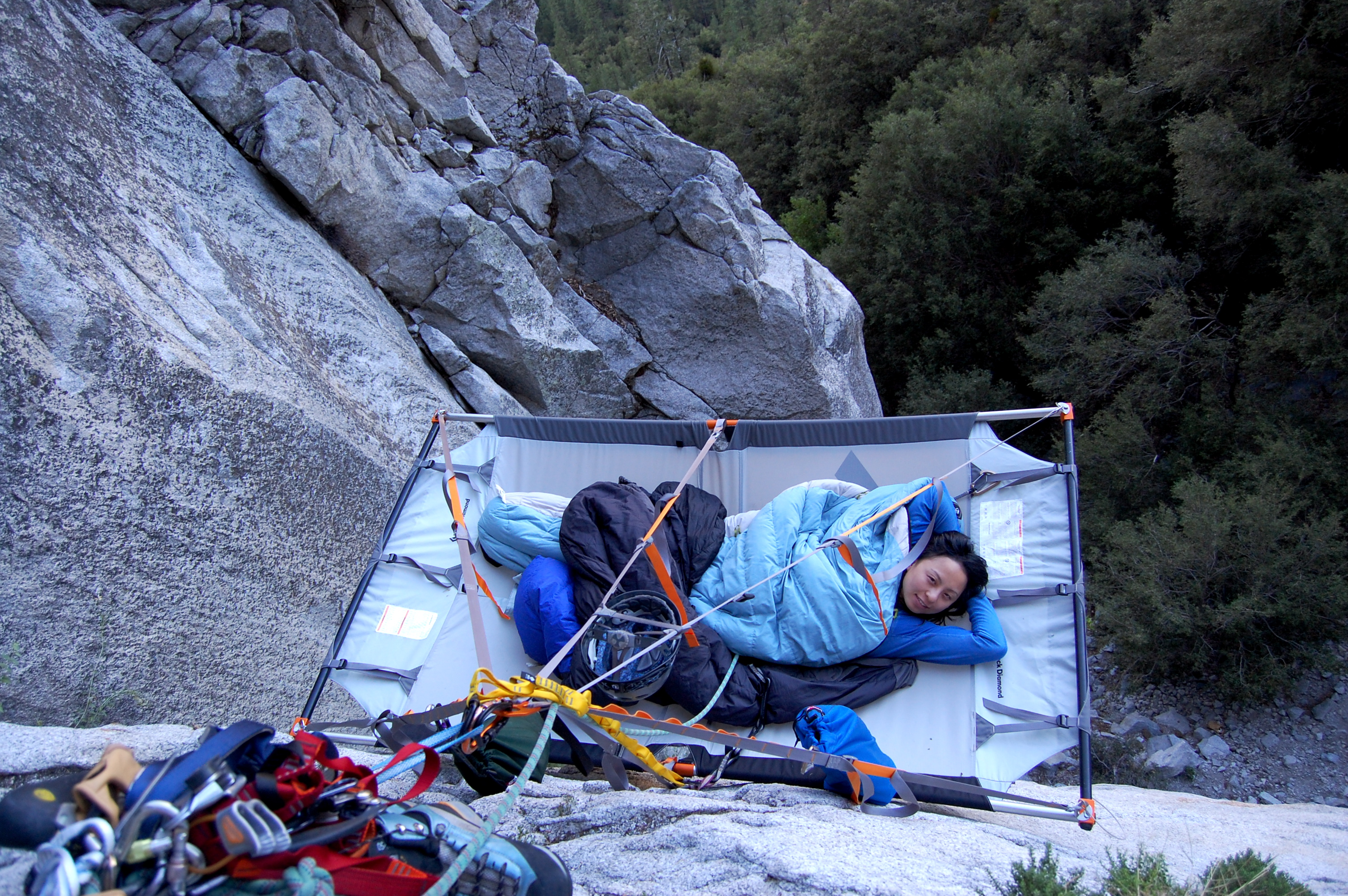
Resting on a portaledge

- Haul bags. Due to the level of equipment and supplies needed, heavy-duty haul bags are used extensively in big wall climbing; self-locking rope capture pulleys are used for hauling up these haul bags on static/tag rope lines.
- Portaledges and poop tubes. For overnight stays, portaledges are used (including rain shields), as well as bivy bags and sleeping bags. Poop tubes are used for capturing human waste, which is disposed of on completion.
- Other clothing. As the climbers are spending long days (and potentially nights) on the route, they will need some basic rain gear and warm jackets; big wall climbers also use kneepads and fingerless gloves (and duct tape) to protect their skin during the extended climbing.

== Techniques ==
While the essence of big wall climbing is that of traditional climbing, and particularly multi-pitch climbing, it also uses a number of specific techniques that are important in being able to meet the unique challenges of ascending big wall routes, which include the following:

Big wall climbing techniques on El Capitan

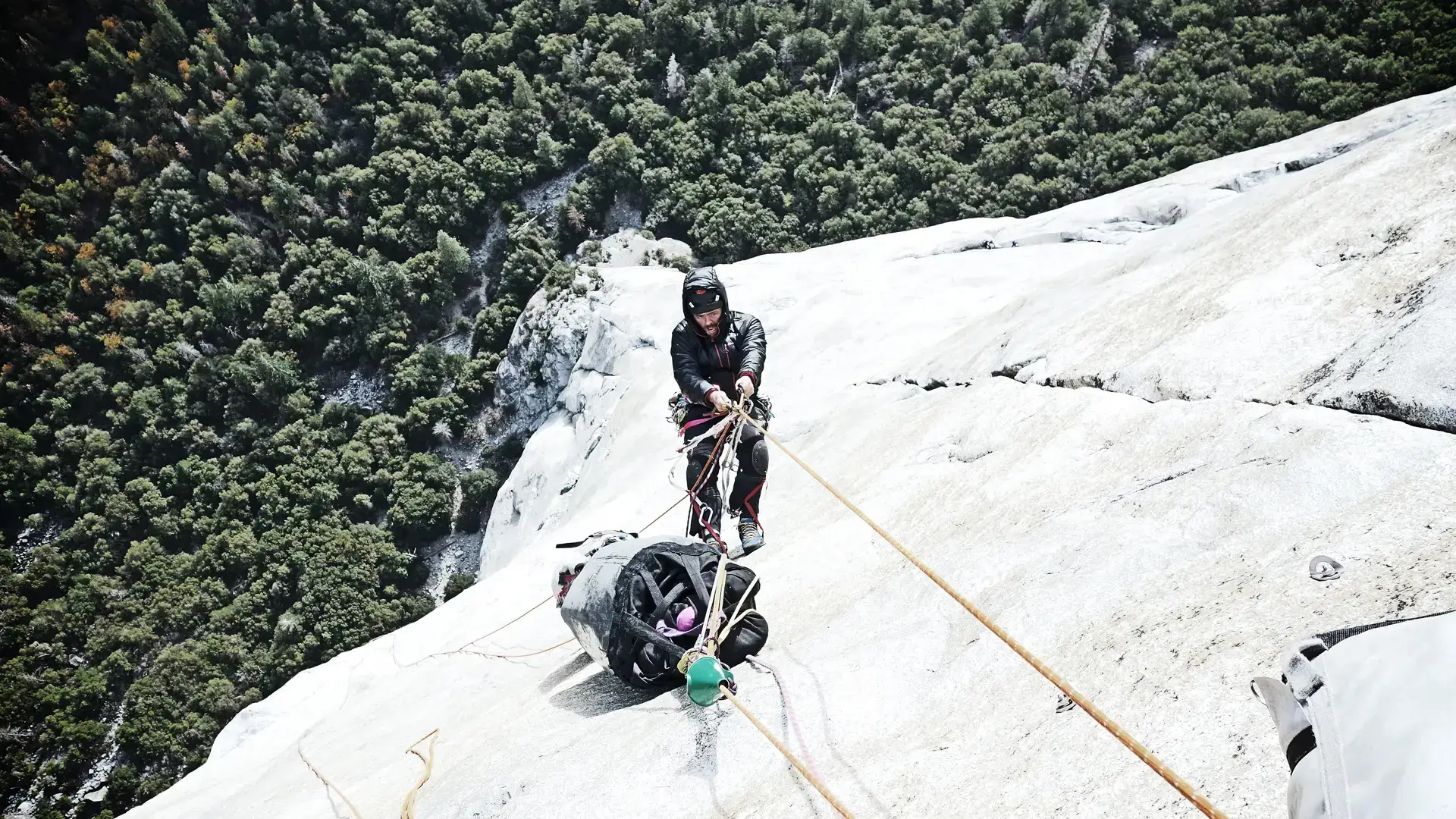
The second-climber jumaring up on a fixed rope to save time.

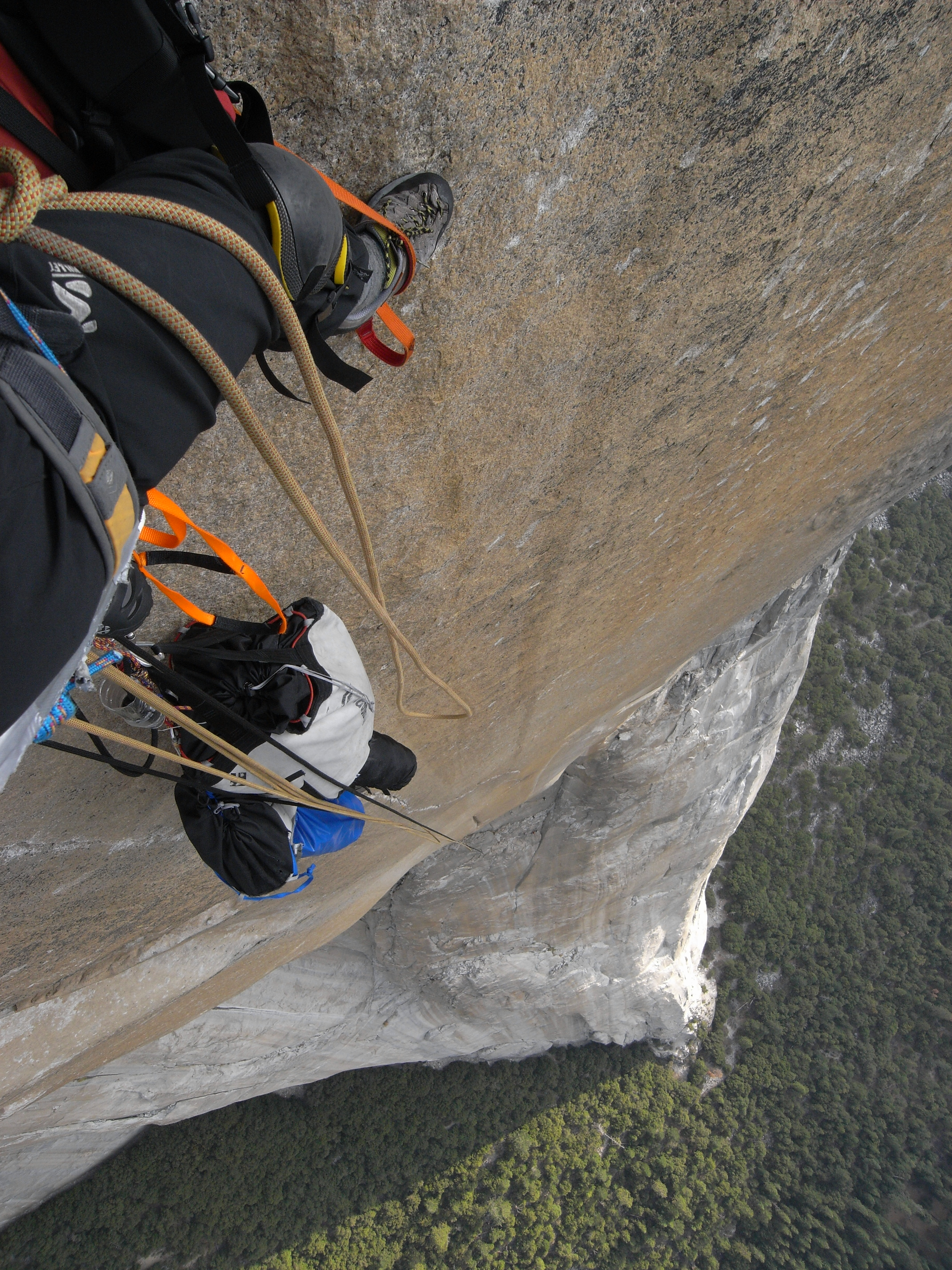
Using trail rope for haul bags

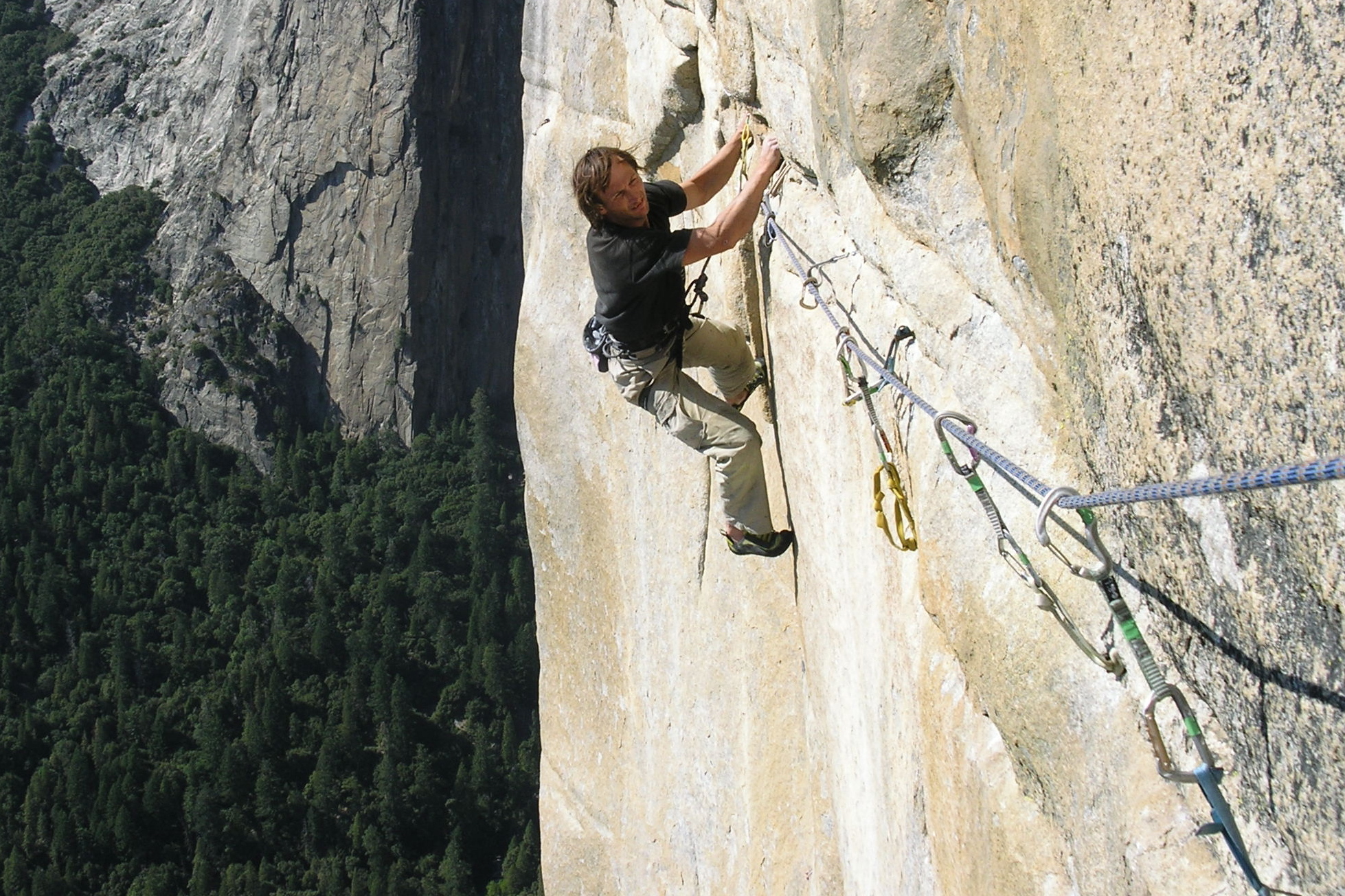
Traverse climbing across a horizontal pitch.

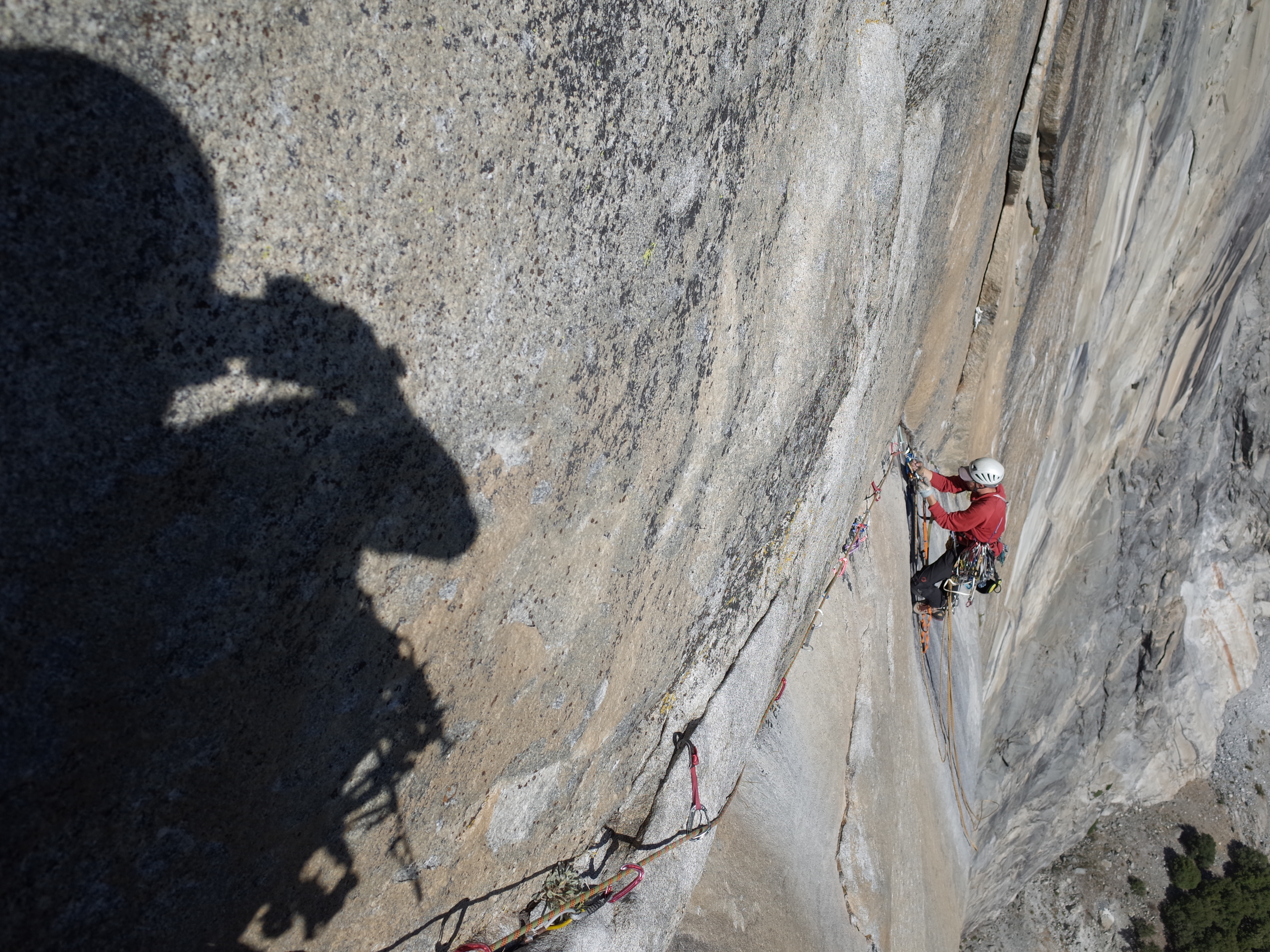
Aid climbing on a hard section.

=== Aid climbing techniques ===
The use of aid-climbing techniques is common in big wall climbing as the scale of the routes mean that some sections may have difficulties that are way beyond the difficulties encountered on the rest of the route. In addition, abseil retreat from big wall routes is serious and complex, and thus climbers may use aid to maintain their upward momentum rather than retreating (also called French free climbing).

=== Jumaring on fixed ropes ===
The belayer (or second-climber) is often not themselves belayed as they ascend the route as per a normal lead climbing team format. To conserve energy and move quickly on the long routes, the lead-climber will anchor their dynamic lead-rope on finishing the pitch, allowing their belayer to jumar-up the now fixed lead-rope (cleaning out the protection that was installed by the lead-climber en route) using ascenders or top rope soloing.

=== Simul climbing techniques ===
To speed up their ascent on long big-wall routes, some climbing pairs will use simul climbing techniques where both climbers (the lead climber and the belayer) move simultaneously up the route without any need to use pitches per lead climbing. Simul climbing techniques are complex and dangerous, and require significant coordination and trust between the climbers.

=== Traverse climbing ===
Some big wall routes can have long horizontal traverse pitches that need to be climbed in order to get to the next crack system. These traverse pitches place increased demands on the skills of the non-leading climber as they cannot use fixed-rope techniques to jumar-up to the lead climber and they effectively have to also lead the pitch (albeit with the protection pre-placed). The 2017 film The Dawn Wall features an extremely difficult big wall traverse pitch that the following climber, Kevin Jorgeson, spent several days trying to overcome.

=== Tension traverses and pendulums ===
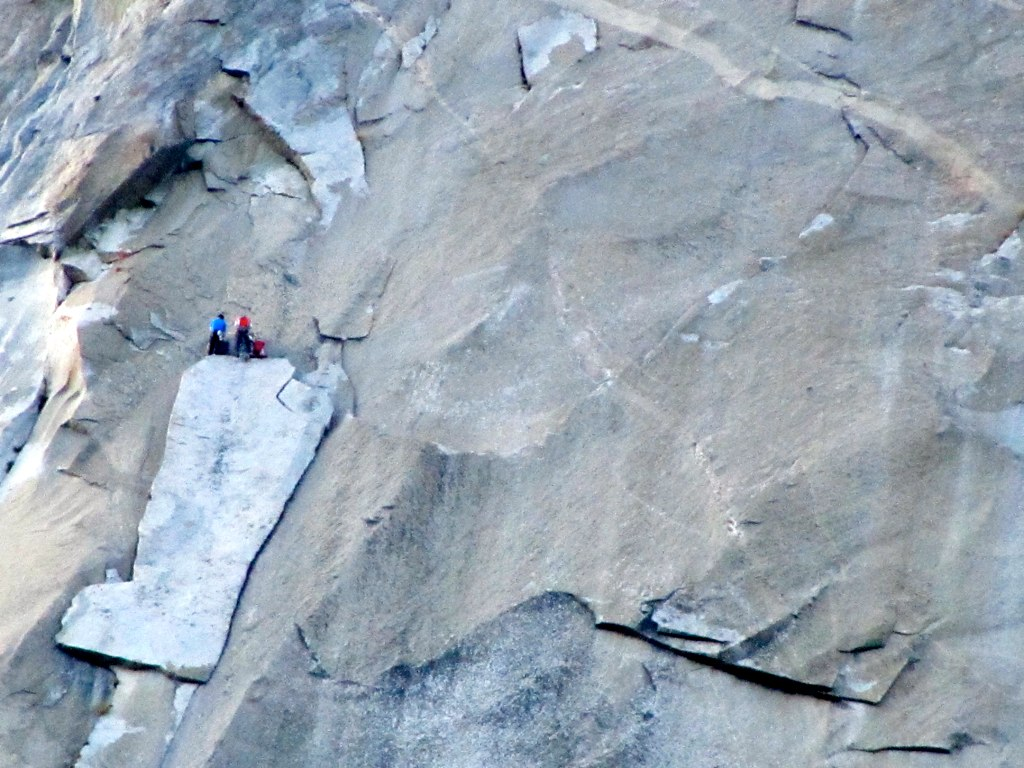
Climbers standing on the top of 'Boot Flake' on El Capitan, preparing to do the "King Swing" pendulum to the next section

On some big wall routes, the 'traverse pitches' may simply be too blank or featureless for most climbers. In such cases the climbers may need to use pendulums or tension traverses (e.g. a half-pendulum that uses rope tension for aid) to move horizontally to reach the next crack system. One of the most notable is King Swing, 100-foot swing from Boot Flake to Eagle Ledge on the Nose (VI 5.9 C2) of El Capitan.

=== Using trailing ropes ===
The lead climber may also use an additional trail rope, which is a thinner and lighter static-rope they trail behind as they ascend. It allows them to pass equipment with their belayer below while on the climb (e.g. pieces of aid gear). Once the lead climber has reached the top of the pitch, they anchor their dynamic lead-rope (which the belayer then jumars up on), and can start hauling up equipment with the trail rope.

== Grading ==
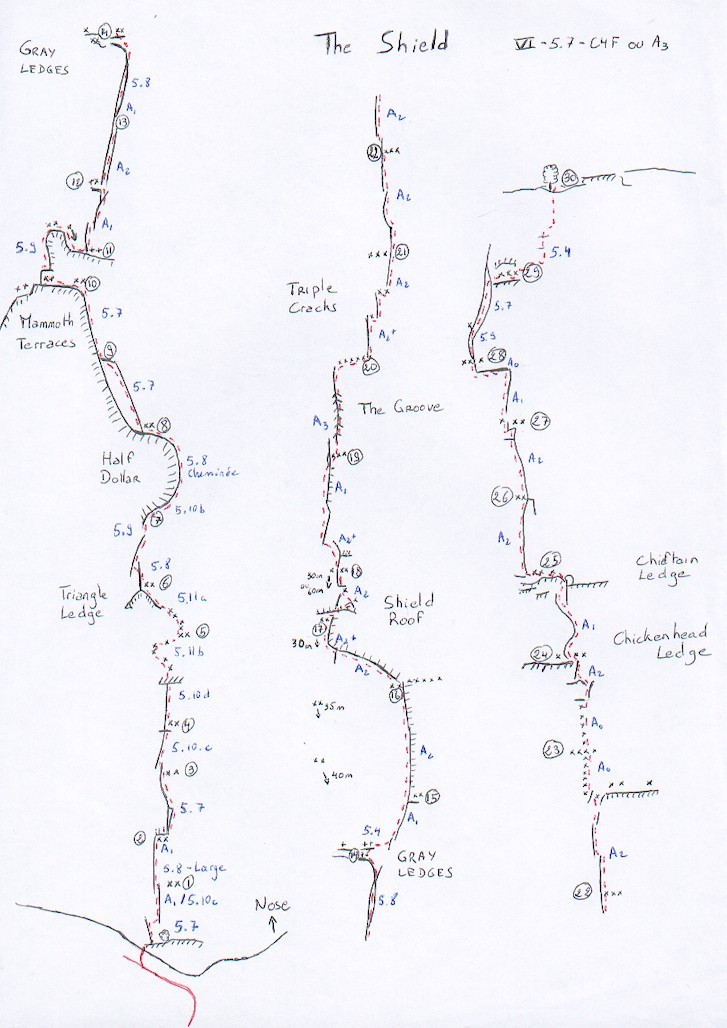
Topo showing the grades of all 30 pitches of The Shield big-wall route (overall grade 5.8 A3) on El Capitan

Big wall climbing is used exclusively in relation to rock climbing. Long rock climbing routes that also have ice or snow, are referred to as alpine climbing. There is overlap in the skill sets, and many famous alpinists such as Walter Bonatti, Catherine Destivelle, and Alexander Huber, were also big wall climbers. The most common grading systems used in big wall climbing are the French, American (also known as the Yosemite Decimal System), and to a lesser extent the UIAA rock climbing grades for free climbing; the A-grade or C-grade systems are used for sections of aid climbing.

In addition to the above rock climbing grades (for both free climbing and for aid climbing), a National Climbing Classification System (NCCS) grade is sometimes quoted on North American big-wall (and alpine) climbs, that are described by the American Alpine Club (republished in 2013) as follows: "North American NCCS grades, often called "commitment grades", indicate the time investment in a route for an "average" climbing team":

- I and II: "Half a day or less for the technical (5th [i.e. Yosemite Decimal System grade] class) portion of the route". Often listed as "1–3 hours" (for grade I), and "3–5 hours" (for grade II).
- III: "Most of a day of roped climbing". Often listed as "5–8 hours".
- IV: "A full day of technical climbing". Often listed as "a full day".
- V: "Typically requires an overnight on the route, or done fast and free in a day". Often listed as "one very long day or two full days".
- VI: "Two or more days of hard climbing". Often listed as "two days to a week".
- VII: "Remote walls climbed in alpine style". Often listed as "more than a week in extreme conditions".

Because of the great length of big-wall routes, detailed topos are usually provided outlining the grades on each pitch, and the aid climbing versus free climbing options at key sections. For example, one of the most famous big wall routes is the 31-pitch 870-metre route The Nose, on El Capitan, which is graded VI 5.9 C2 as a partial aid climb (mainly due to its roof section), but which is graded VI 5.14a (8b+) if climbed completely free.

== Evolution of grade milestones ==
The following big wall free climbing redpoints (i.e. no aid) are notable in the evolution of big wall climbing grade milestones and standards from being a skill used in alpine climbing to a standalone sport in its own right; some are at the borderline of being multi-pitch rather than big wall climbs:

=== Redpointed ===
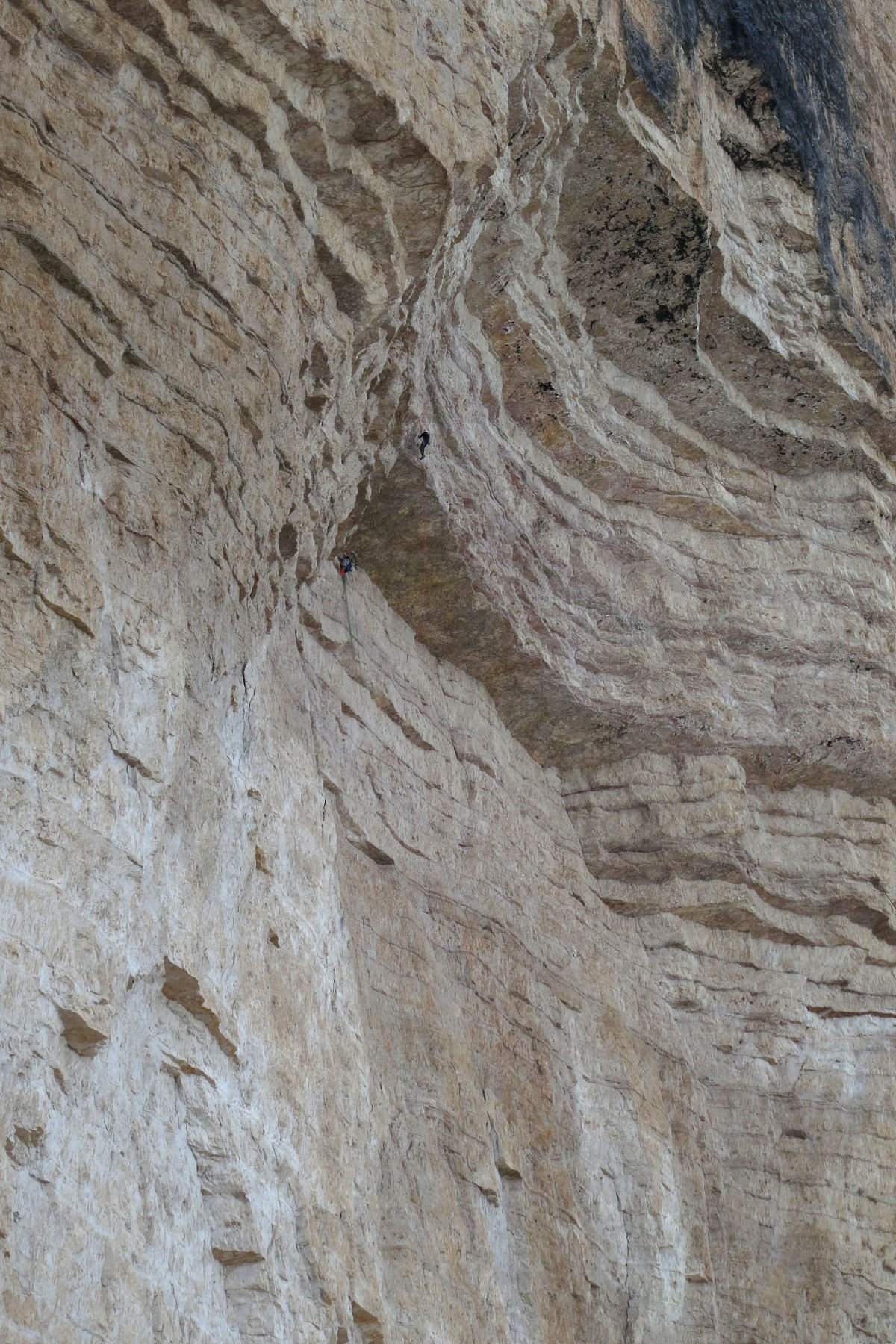
Climbers on the roof of Pan Aroma (and Bellavista) 8c (5.14b) on the Cima Ovest in the Dolomites.

- 2015: The Dawn Wall (1,000-metres, 32-pitches), El Capitan. First-ever big wall redpoint at 9a (5.14d), by Tommy Caldwell and Kevin Jorgeson; 19 days. Repeated in 2016 by Adam Ondra; 8 days.
- 2001: Bellavista (500-metres, 10-pitches), Cima Ovest. First-ever big wall redpoint at 8c (5.14b), by Alexander Huber; repeating it in 2007 to create Pan Aroma 8c, Huber found key holds "treated" from a 2005 attempt, and the crux was lined with pegs, which softened grade to 8b/8b+.
- 1993: The Nose (870-metres, 31-pitches), El Capitan. Second-ever big wall free climb at 5.14a (8b+), by Lynn Hill (partnered by Brooke Sandahl); it is considered as one of the most important ascents in rock climbing history, and a major milestone in both female and big wall rock climbing; in 1994, Hill repeated it in under 24 hours, and it took over a decade for the second free climb of the route to happen.
- 1991: Neverending Story (450-metres, 11-pitches), 7th Kirlichspitze, Rätikon. First big wall free climb at 8b+ (5.14a), by Beat Kammerlander.
- 1989: New Age (150-metres, 5-pitches), 7th Kirlichspitze, Rätikon. First multi-pitch/big wall free climb at 8a+ (5.13c), by Beat Kammerlander.
- 1988: Salathé Wall (870-metres, 35-pitches), El Capitan. First big wall free climb at 8a (5.13b), by Todd Skinner and Paul Piana, and the first free climb of a major El Capitan big wall route.
- 1988: Via Acacia (330-metres, 9-pitches), 5th Kirlichspitze, Rätikon, Switzerland. First big wall free climb at 7c+ (5.13a), by Martin Scheel.
- 1976: Northwest Face (690-metres, 24-pitches) Half Dome, Yosemite. First big wall free climb at 7b (5.12b) by Art Higbee and Jim Erickson.
- 1975: Astroman (300-metres, 12-pitches) Washington Column, Yosemite. First big wall free climb at 5.11c (6c+) by Ron Kauk, John Long, John Bachar.
- 1968: Mittelpfeiler (300-metres, 7-pitches), Heiligkreuzkofel, Dolomites. First big wall free climb at 7a (5.11d) by Reinhold and Günther Messner.
- 1929: Via Micheluzzi (720-metres, 19-pitches), Marmolada, Dolomites. First big wall climb at 6a (5.10a) Luigi Micheluzzi, R. Parathoner, D. Christomannos.
- 1925: Via Solleder (1100-metres, 44-pitches), Civetta, Dolomites. First big wall free climb at 5c (5.9) by Emil Solleder and Gustl Lettenbauer.

=== Free-soloed ===
- 2017: Freerider (915-meters, 30-pitches), El Capitan. First-ever big wall free solo at 5.13a (7c+), by Alex Honnold; 3 hrs, 56 min.
- 2007: Fish Route (850-meters, 37-pitches), Marmolada. First-ever big wall free solo at 7b+ (5.12c), by Hansjorg Auer; 2 hr, 55 min.
- 2005: Romantic Warrior (305-meters, 9-pitches), Needles, California. First-ever big wall free solo at 7b (5.12b), by Michael Reardon;
- 2002: Brandler-Hasse Direttissima (580-meters, 17-pitches), Cima Grande. First-ever big wall free solo at 7a+ (5.12a), by Alexander Huber.

=== High-altitude and expedition ===
A number of big wall-free climbs are notable for their high altitude or the remoteness of the expedition:

- 2012: Bavarian Direct (700-metres, 28-pitches, 5.13b), on Mount Asgard. First free ascent of the 1997 aid climb by Alexander Huber and Thomas Huber.
- 2009: Eternal Flame (650-metres, 24-pitches, 5.13a), on Trango ("Nameless") Tower. First free ascent by Alexander Huber and Thomas Huber of the historic 1989 Güllich, Albert et al. route.

== In film ==
A number of notable films have been made focused on big wall climbing including:

- El Capitan, a 1978 documentary film about an early ascent of The Nose (VI 5.9 C2) on El Capitan.
- Meru, a 2015 documentary film about the ascent of a Himalayan big wall route called the Shark's Fin,
- Valley Uprising, a 2014 Amazon Prime documentary film about rock climbing in Yosemite, that includes big wall climbing.
- The Dawn Wall, a 2017 Netflix documentary film about Tommy Caldwell and Kevin Jorgeson's ascent of the first-ever big wall route at 5.14d (9a).
- Free Solo, a 2018 Netflix documentary film about Alex Honnold's free solo climb of Freerider 5.13a (7c+) on El Capitan.
- The Alpinist, a 2021 documentary film about the late Canadian alpinist Marc-André Leclerc, featuring his solo ascent of Torre Egger in Patagonia

== See also ==
- Alpine climbing
- Free solo climbing
- Sport climbing
