= Tommy Caldwell =

American rock climber

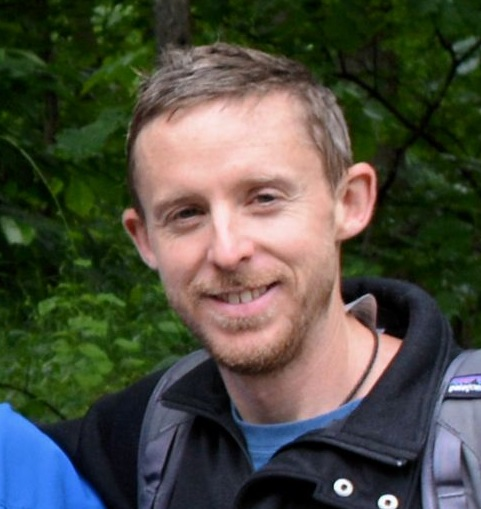
- Caldwell in 2015

Personal information
- Born: August 11, 1978 (age 48) Estes Park, Colorado, U.S.
- Occupation: Professional rock climber
- Website: tommycaldwell.com

Climbing career
- Type of climber: Traditional climbing; Sport climbing; Big wall climbing
- Highest grade: Redpoint: 5.15a (9a+); Bouldering: V13 (8B)
- First ascents: Flex Luthor (2003, 9a+); The Dawn Wall (9a, 2015)
- Known for: First to free climb a big wall route at 9a (5.14d) with The Dawn Wall; Speed record holder on The Nose

Tommy Caldwell (born August 11, 1978) is an American rock climber who has set records in sport climbing, traditional climbing, and in big-wall climbing. Caldwell made the first free ascents of several major routes on El Capitan in Yosemite National Park.

He made the first ascents of some of the hardest sport climbing routes in the U.S., including Kryptonite at 5.14d (9a) in 1999, and Flex Luthor at 9a+ (5.15a) in 2003, both at the Fortress of Solitude in Colorado. In January 2015, Caldwell and Kevin Jorgeson over 19-days made the first free ascent of The Dawn Wall on El Capitan, which was the first-ever big wall free climb at 9a (5.14d) in history.

In 2015, National Geographic called Caldwell "arguably the best all-around rock climber on the planet", and he is an important figure in the history of the sport.

== Early life and education ==
Caldwell grew up in Loveland, Colorado. His father is Mike Caldwell, a former teacher, professional body builder, mountain guide and rock climber, who introduced Tommy to rock climbing at a young age. His mother, Terry, was also a mountain guide. The family, including Tommy's sister, went on annual trips to Yosemite National Park where Tommy's love for the park and rock climbing flourished.

== Taken hostage in Kyrgyzstan and Uzbekistan ==
Caldwell and three fellow climbers Beth Rodden, John Dickey, and Jason 'Singer' Smith were held hostage for six days by rebels in Kyrgyzstan in August 2000. Caldwell pushed one of the kidnappers off a cliff, and subsequently escaped to government soldiers. A few weeks later they learned that the man had survived the fall. A book about their ordeal, Over the Edge was written by Greg Child. A follow-up article, "Back from the Edge", was published in Outside magazine the following year. Caldwell gave a filmed lecture "How Becoming a Hostage and Losing a Finger Made Him a Better Climber". The Kyrgyzstan incident is included in the 2017 film The Dawn Wall.

== Loss of a finger ==
Caldwell accidentally sawed off much of his left index finger with a table saw in 2001. Doctors were able to reattach the severed portion, but Caldwell decided he did not want the useless finger, which doctors said would never heal fully and he would never be able to use to climb with again, and the damaged part of the finger was later permanently removed. After three surgeries and two blood transfusions, Caldwell was told by the doctor "You better start thinking about what else you want to do with your life." Facing the fear of never climbing again and losing something he loved so much became Caldwell's greatest strength.

== Achilles tendon tear ==
In February 2022, Caldwell fell while projecting Magic Line, a 5.14c (8c+) trad route in Yosemite National Park, tearing his Achilles tendon as he struck the wall, requiring a full reconstruction. Six weeks later, he started climbing again, resoling his orthopedic boot with the rubber used for climbing shoes, only to re-rupture his Achilles while attempting an outdoor climb. Foregoing surgery, he restarted his recovery process, following his doctor's orders more strictly, before tearing his Achilles once more during a physical therapy session, requiring another reconstruction.

== Notable climbs ==
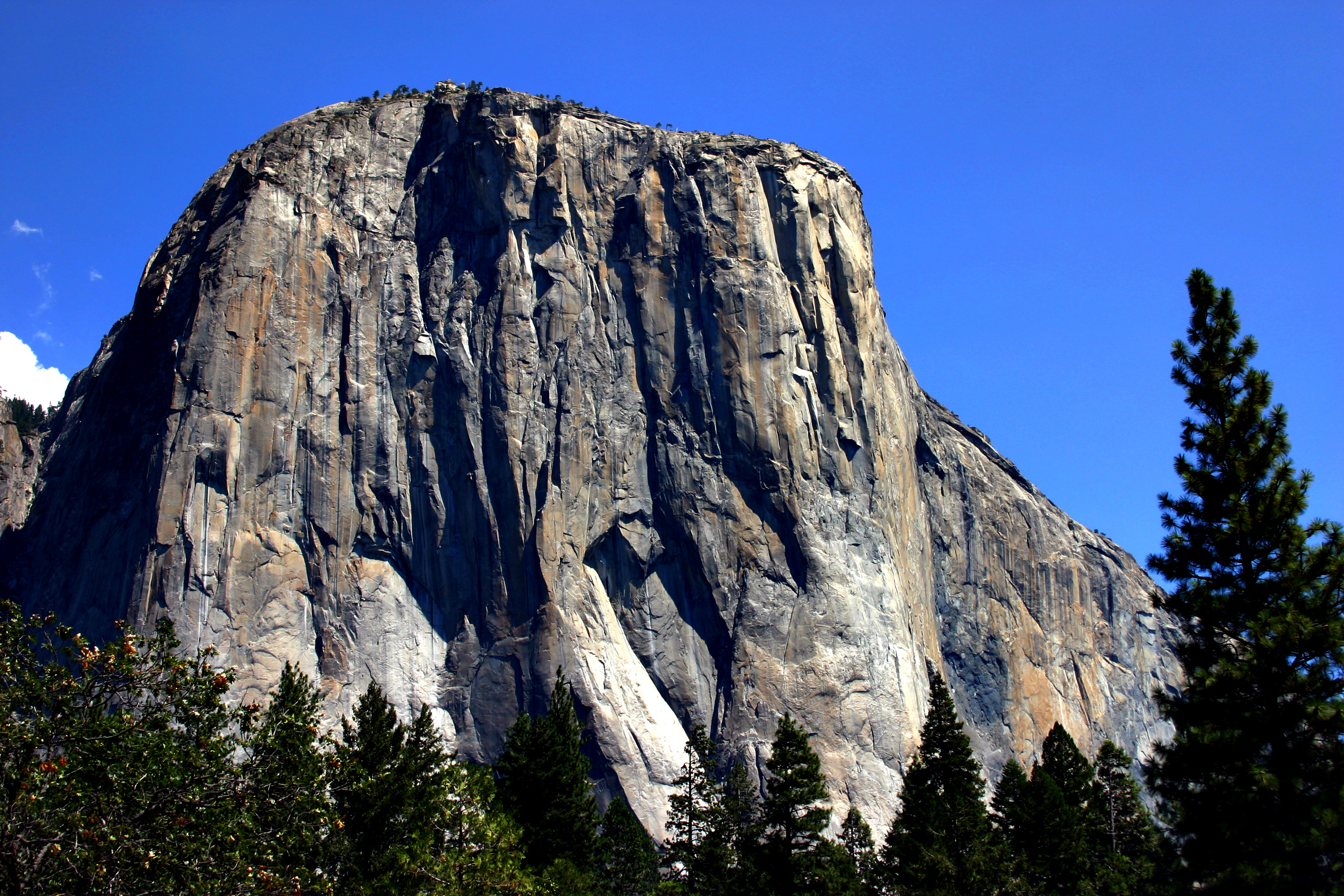
El Capitan in Yosemite

He made the first ascents of some of the United States' hardest sport routes including Flex Luthor in 2003 at the Fortress of Solitude, in Colorado, which remained unrepeated for 18 years, before getting its first repeat by Matty Hong in October 2021, who suggested a possible grade 5.15b (9b), but was re-graded to 9a+ (5.15a) by Jonathan Siegrist in 2022.

In May 2004, he completed the first free ascent (FFA) of Dihedral Wall. In 2005, he and Beth Rodden—swapping leads—made the third and fourth free ascents of The Nose. Two days later, on October 16, Caldwell free-climbed The Nose in less than 12 hours. A few days later, Caldwell free-climbed The Nose in 11 hours, descended the East Ledges, and then free-climbed Freerider, topping out 12 hours later – the first ascent of two El Capitan free climbs in 24 hours. On El Capitan, Caldwell has also free-climbed: Lurking Fear, Muir Wall, West Buttress, Salathé, Zodiac, Magic Mushroom, The Dawn Wall, New Dawn, and Heart Route.

In January 2015, Caldwell and Kevin Jorgeson completed the first free climb of The Dawn Wall on El Capitan in Yosemite National Park, after six years of planning and preparation. Their 19-day ascent of The Dawn Wall was the first-ever free climb of a big wall route at the grade of 9a (5.14d) in history. The ascent captured global attention and was praised by President Barack Obama, who said: "You remind us that anything is possible", and which was made into the 2017 climbing film, The Dawn Wall.

The following year Czech climber Adam Ondra free climbed the Dawn Wall in 8 days. Ondra praised Caldwell and Jorgeson saying, "Tommy and Kevin put so much effort into the climb and faced so many question marks and logistical problems that I cannot really compare my effort to theirs. I had it prepared, had all the knowledge. I knew it was possible."

== Documentaries ==
=== Progression ===
Caldwell was one of the climbers featured in the 2009 film Progression. The film discussed his quest to climb The Dawn Wall, and it was after seeing the film that Jorgeson contacted Caldwell to join him in the effort.

=== The Dawn Wall ===
The Dawn Wall, a documentary following Caldwell and Jorgeson on their free climb of The Dawn Wall, was released on November 18, 2017 The documentary was directed by Josh Lowell and Peter Mortimer.

=== Free Solo ===
Caldwell appeared in the documentary Free Solo, released on September 28, 2018, about Alex Honnold's free solo ascent of Freerider on El Capitan in Yosemite National Park. In the documentary, Caldwell is seen working with Honnold to prepare for the climb and is interviewed about Honnold and rock climbing.

=== A Line Across the Sky ===
The Red Bull TV Reel Rock episode A Line Across The Sky, released in 2018, followed Caldwell and Honnold's attempt to traverse the Fitz Roy peaks in Patagonia, comprising seven peaks and 4,000 feet of vertical climbing.

=== The Devil's Climb ===
The Devil's Climb Plimsoll Productions was released October 17, 2024. Climbers Alex Honnold and Tommy Caldwell embark on an expedition to conquer Alaska's treacherous Devil's Thumb. The documentary was directed by Renan Öztürk and Drew Pulley.

== Notable ascents ==
- 2001: The Honeymoon is Over V 5.13 Longs Peak, Colorado. FFA with Beth Rodden belaying.
- 2003: Flex Luthor (9a+ 5.15a), Fortress of Solitude, Colorado
- 2003: West Buttress (FFA) VI 5.13c, El Capitan, Yosemite Valley, California
- 2004: Dihedral Wall (FFA) VI 5.14a, El Capitan, Yosemite Valley, California
- 2005: The Nose VI 5.14a/b, 3rd/4th Free Ascent (with Beth Rodden), El Capitan, Yosemite Valley, California
- 2006: Linea di Eleganza VI 5.11b A3 90 degrees M7 Fitz Roy, Argentine Patagonia. FFA with Topher Donahue and Erik Roed.
- 2008: Magic Mushroom (FFA) VI 5.14a with Justen Sjong, May 12–17, 2008, El Capitan, Yosemite, California
- 2012: Yosemite Triple Crown 5.13a, 1st All Free Ascent with Alex Honnold
- 2013: Dunn-Westbay 5.14a, 1st Free Ascent with Joe Mills, Longs Peak, Colorado
- 2014: Fitz Traverse VI 5.11d C1 65 degrees, First Ascent with Alex Honnold
- 2015: The Dawn Wall (FFA) 5.14d with Kevin Jorgeson, December 27, 2014 – January 14, 2015, El Capitan, Yosemite, California
- 2018: The Nose 5.9 C2, Sub- 2-hour record (1:58:07) with Alex Honnold, El Capitan, Yosemite Valley, California
- 2026 : South African Route (5.12c) with Siebe Vanhee, East Face of the Central Tower of Paine, Chilean Patagonia, 1st one-day free ascent

== Personal life ==
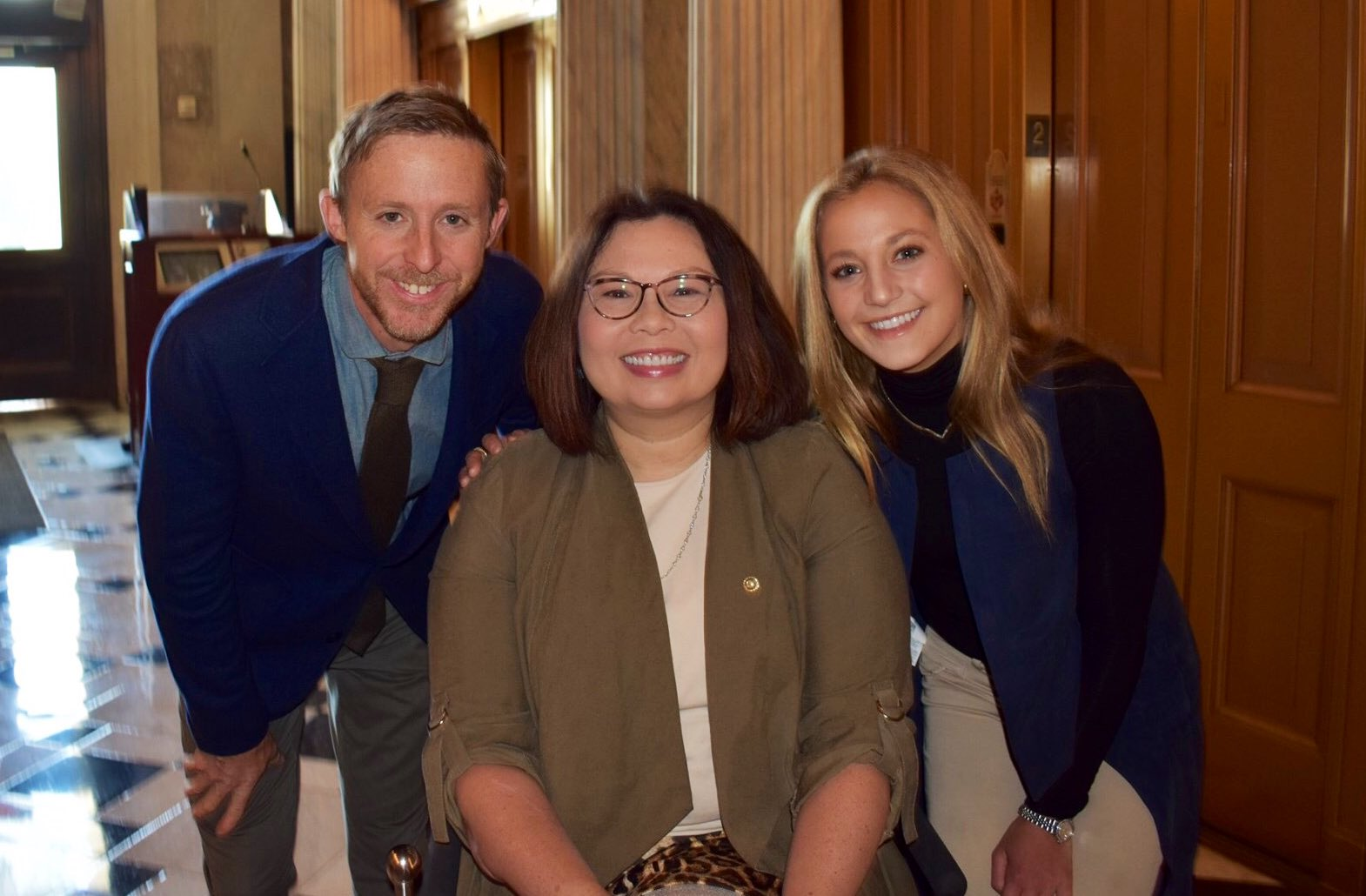
Caldwell pictured in 2019 with U.S. Senator Tammy Duckworth and climber Sasha DiGiulian

Caldwell and Beth Rodden married in 2003, and subsequently divorced in 2010. In 2010 he met photographer Rebecca Pietsch. They married in 2012. The couple have a son and a daughter, and live in Estes Park, Colorado.

== Publications ==
- Caldwell, Tommy (2017). The Push: A Climber's Journey of Endurance, Risk and Going Beyond Limits. London: Michael Joseph. ISBN 9780718183394.
- Caldwell, Tommy (2018). The Push: A Climber's Search for the Path. Penguin Books. ISBN 9780399562716.

== See also ==
- History of rock climbing
- List of grade milestones in rock climbing
- Alex Honnold
- Beth Rodden
- Alexander Huber
