= The Dawn Wall =

2017 film by Josh Lowell and Peter Mortimer

- Theatrical release poster
- Directed by: Josh Lowell; Peter Mortimer
- Starring: Tommy Caldwell; Kevin Jorgeson
- Cinematography: Brett Lowell
- Music by: Adam Crystal
- Production companies: Red Bull Media House; Sender Films
- Distributed by: 1091 Pictures
- Release date: November 18, 2017 (IDFA)
- Running time: 100 minutes
- Countries: United States; Austria
- Language: English

The Dawn Wall is a 2017 American-Austrian documentary film directed by Josh Lowell and Peter Mortimer about Tommy Caldwell and Kevin Jorgeson's successful attempt to create the first-ever big wall free climbing route on the historic southeast face (The Wall of Early Morning Light) of El Capitan in Yosemite National Park. The face had hitherto only been ascended by aid climbing techniques which were used by Warren Harding to make the first ascent of the face in 1970. On completing the first free ascent of the face, they named their new route, The Dawn Wall.

== Release ==
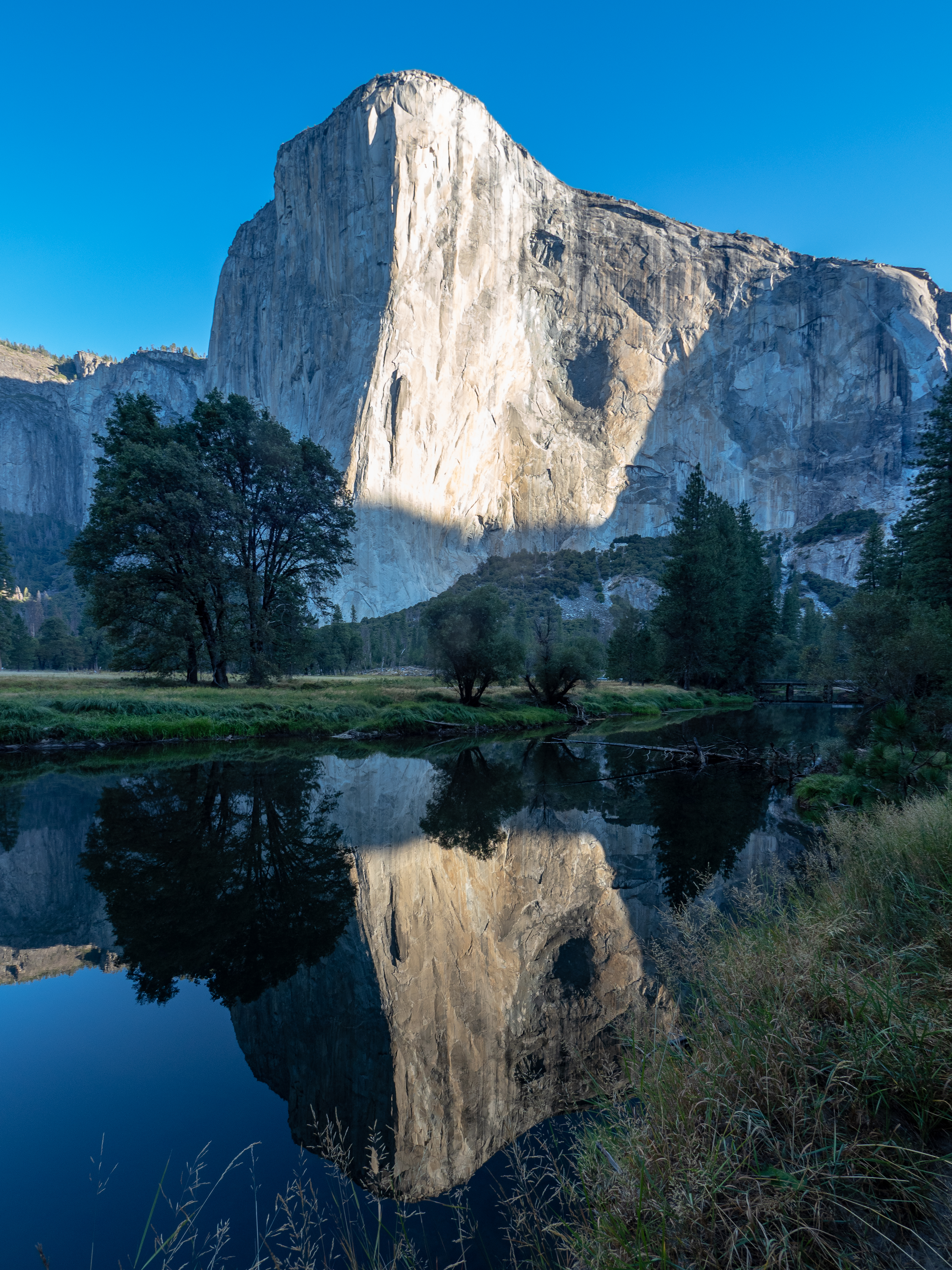
Reflection of El Capitan in the Merced River with The Dawn Wall illuminated by the early morning light

The film premiered at the International Documentary Film Festival Amsterdam on November 18, 2017.

== Reception ==
=== Critical response ===
On the review aggregator website Rotten Tomatoes, 100% of 18 critics' reviews are positive, with an average rating of 8.7/10. Metacritic, which uses a weighted average, assigned the film a score of 81 out of 100, based on 6 critics, indicating "universal acclaim".

=== Accolades ===
Award	Date of ceremony	Category	Recipient(s)	Result	Ref.
International Documentary Film Festival Amsterdam	November 22, 2017	Audience Award	The Dawn Wall	Nominated	
SXSW Film Festival	March 18, 2018	Audience Award: Documentary Spotlight	The Dawn Wall	Won	
Trento Film Festival	May 6, 2018	Best Mountaineering Film	The Dawn Wall	Won	
Trento Film Festival	May 6, 2018	Mario Bello Award	The Dawn Wall	Won	
Trento Film Festival	May 6, 2018	UIAA Prize	The Dawn Wall	Won	
San Francisco Documentary Festival	June 18, 2018	Audience Award: Best Feature	The Dawn Wall	Won	
Melbourne International Film Festival	August 23, 2018	Best Documentary	The Dawn Wall	Fourth place	
Melbourne International Film Festival	August 23, 2018	Documentary Audience Award	The Dawn Wall	Nominated	
Critics' Choice Documentary Awards	November 11, 2018	Best Cinematography	Brett Lowell	Nominated	
Mountainfilm International Film Festival Graz	November 17, 2018	Grand Prix Graz	The Dawn Wall	Won	
Kendal Mountain Festival	November 18, 2018	Best Climbing Film	The Dawn Wall	Won	
Cinema Eye Honors Awards	January 11, 2019	Outstanding Achievement in Production	Josh Lowell, Peter Mortimer, and Philipp Manderla	Nominated	
Producers Guild of America Awards	January 19, 2019	Outstanding Producer of Documentary Theatrical Motion Pictures	Josh Lowell, Peter Mortimer, and Philipp Manderla	Nominated	
Cinema for Peace Awards	May 7, 2019	International Green Film Award	The Dawn Wall	Nominated	
Sports Emmy Awards	August 11, 2020	Outstanding Long Sports Documentary	The Dawn Wall	Nominated	
Sports Emmy Awards	August 11, 2020	Outstanding Camera Work	Brett Lowell	Nominated	

== See also ==
- Free Solo, a 2018 film on Alex Honnold's first free solo of El Capitan in Yosemite
- Meru, a 2015 film on the ascent of the Shark's Fin route on Meru Peak
