= Todd Skinner =

American mountaineer and rock climber

- Born: Todd Richard Skinner; October 27, 1958; Pinedale, Wyoming, U.S.
- Died: October 23, 2006 (aged 47)
- Education: University of Wyoming
- Occupation: Rock climber

Todd Richard Skinner (October 27, 1958 – October 23, 2006) was an American rock climber and expert in big wall climbing. He made the first free ascents of many routes around the world, including his historic first free ascent with Paul Piana in 1988 of the Salathe Wall on El Capitan in Yosemite; it was one of the first-ever big wall climbs at 5.13b (8a), and led to the birth of "free climbing" Yosemite.

Skinner's story was told in Jeff Smoot's 2019 book, Hangdog Days.

== Personal life ==
Skinner was born in Pinedale, Wyoming, and planned to "take a little while off to climb" after gaining a degree in finance from the University of Wyoming in 1982. Instead, he became a full-time free climber and motivational speaker. In 1990, he settled in Lander, Wyoming, in part because he considered the dolomite cliffs there to be the ultimate training ground for free climbing. He opened the Wild Iris Mountain Sports store in Lander and encouraged visits by climbers from around the world. He was married with three children.

=== Death ===
Todd Skinner was attempting to free climb the Jesus Built My Hotrod route up the face of Leaning Tower in Yosemite National Park on October 23, 2006. While rappelling down, he fell 500 feet (150 m) and died. The accident was a result of the failure of the belay loop of his climbing harness. Jim Hewett, a friend of Skinner, had previously observed that the harness appeared worn.

== Notable first free ascents ==
- 1985 – The Gunfighter (5.13b), Hueco Tanks, Texas, United States.
- 1986 – City Park (5.13d), Lower Index Town Wall, Washington, United States
- 1988 – Salathe Wall (VI 5.13b), El Capitan, Yosemite, the first-ever big wall climbs at 5.13b (8a), and the birth of "free climbing" Yosemite.
- 1989 – Lizzy Beams Desire (5.14a), Black Hills, South Dakota, United States
- 1990 – The Jaded Lady (VI 5.12a), North face of Mt. Hooker, Wind River Range, Wyoming. With Paul Piana, Galen Rowell and Tim Toula.
- 1991 - Throwin' the Houlihan (5.14a), Wild Iris, Wyoming, United States
- 1992 – The Great Canadian Knife (VI 5.13b), Cirque of the Unclimbables, Yukon Territories, Canada.
- 1993 – Northwest Direct Route (VI 5.13d) on Half Dome, Yosemite.
- 1995 – Cowboy Direct (VII 5.13a) East Face of Nameless Tower, Pakistan's Karakoram Himalayas.
- 1998 – War and Poetry (VI 5.12c), Ulamertorsuaq, Cape Farewell, of Greenland
- 2000 – True at First Light (VI 5.13a), East Face of Poi, Ndoto Mountains, Northern Kenya
- 2004 – Wet Lycra Nightmare (V 5.13d), Leaning Tower, Yosemite, California, United States

== See also ==
- List of grade milestones in rock climbing
- History of rock climbing
