= Salathé Wall =

Technical climbing route up El Capitan

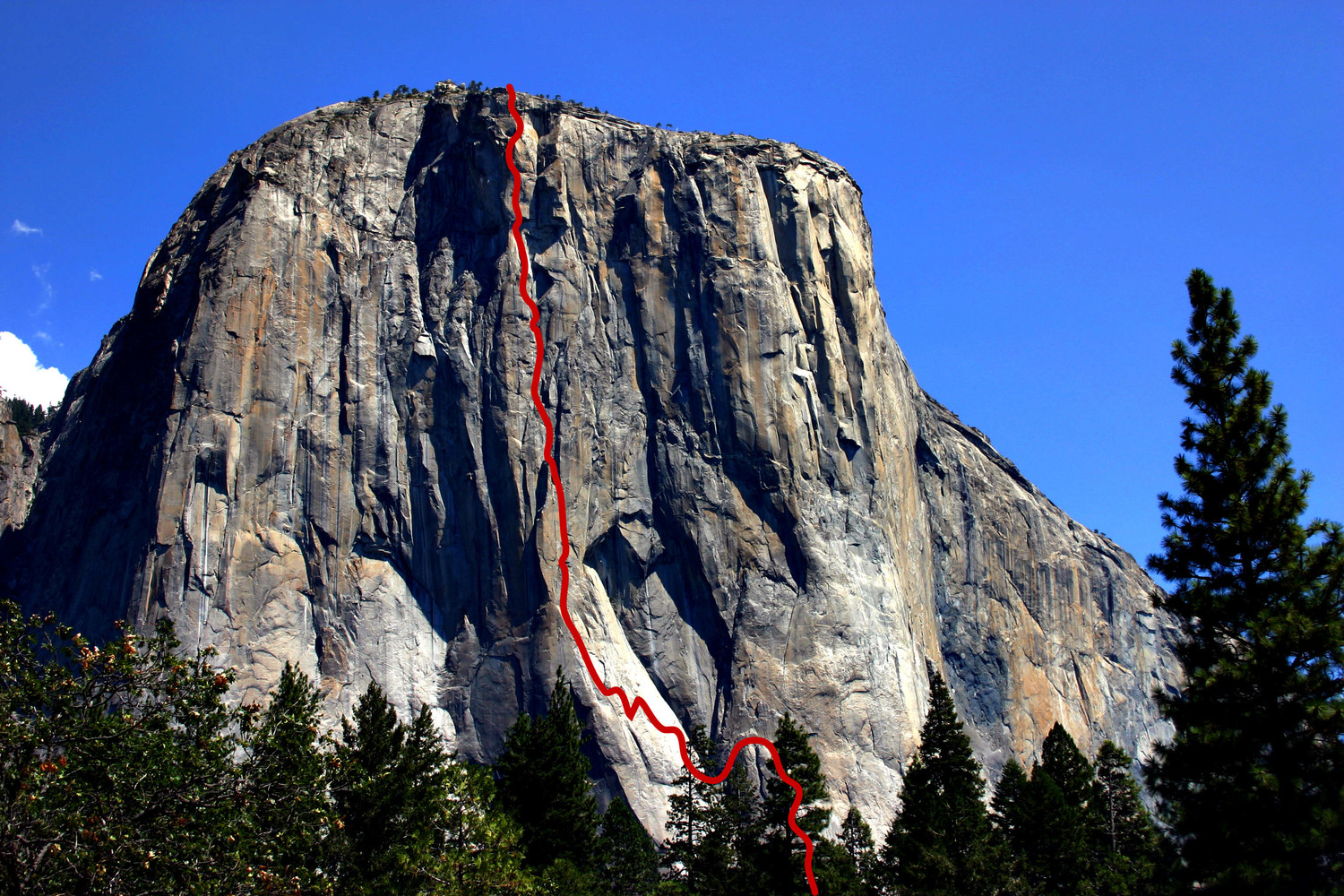
- Southwest face of El Capitan from Yosemite Valley with the Salathé Wall route marked in red
- Location: California, USA
- Coordinates: 37°44′02.4″N 119°38′13.2″W
- Climbing area: Yosemite Valley
- Route type: Big wall climbing; Aid climbing; Traditional climbing
- Vertical gain: 2,900 ft (884 m)
- Pitches: 35
- Technical grade: 5.13b (8a) (full free climb); 5.9 (5c) C2 (use of aid)
- NCCS grade: VI
- First ascent: Royal Robbins, Tom Frost, and Chuck Pratt, 1961
- First free ascent: Paul Piana and Todd Skinner (1988, alternating pitches); Alexander Huber (1995, climbed all the pitches)
- First female free ascent: Steph Davis, 2005
- Known for: First-ever multi-pitch 5.13b (8a) in history

The Salathé Wall is one of the original big wall climbing routes up El Capitan, a 3,000-foot (900 m) high granite monolith in Yosemite National Park. The Salathé Wall was named by Yvon Chouinard in honor of John Salathé, a pioneer of rock climbing in Yosemite. The route is recognized in the historic climbing text Fifty Classic Climbs of North America and is considered a classic worldwide.

== Climbing history ==
=== First ascents ===
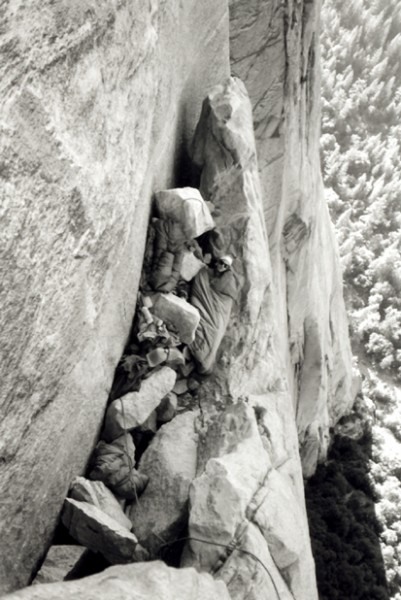
Rock climber Chuck Pratt bivouacking during the first ascent of the Salathé Wall in September 1961.

The first ascent was in 1961 by Royal Robbins, Tom Frost, and Chuck Pratt. After climbing about a quarter of the route, they retreated to re-supply, leaving four fixed ropes in place. Quickly returning, they jumared back up the ropes and totally committed to climbing the upper wall in a single push, which they did in 6 days using only 15 bolts total. The route was about 25% free climbing with sections of run-out at grade 5.9, and the rest being aid climbing which was also difficult at grade A4. A year later, Robbins and Frost returned and did the route in a single push from the bottom.

In 1972, Peter Haan became the first to aid climb the route alone as a rope solo, using pitons for aid and protection. It was his first big wall climb.

=== First free ascents ===
In 1975, Kevin Worral and Mike Graham, starting from the Nose route, traversed left a bit to join this route and free climbed pitches 4 through 10 of Salathe Wall Route up to Mammoth Terraces, adding three pitches of 5.11. A little later, John Long, and John Bachar free climbed pitch three (5.11b) making all 10 pitches free. These ten free pitches, often free climbed as a standalone multi-pitch climbing route in its own right, are known as Freeblast (5.11c).

In 1979, Mark Hudon and Max Jones, climbing from the ground up, led all but 250 feet of the route free, adding three pitches of 5.12 and 5 or 6 of 5.11.

In 1988, Todd Skinner and Paul Piana made the first free ascent by free climbing all the sections (each climber free climbed only about half of the route, with 2 hanging belays for resting) during a nine-day push, after thirty days of working the route, and gave it a grade of 5.13c. The Salathe Wall was the first major route on El Capitan to be fully free climbed, and was the first-ever free ascent of a big wall route in history at the grade of 5.13b (8a).

In 1995, Alexander Huber became the first individual to free climb all the individual pitches, leading every pitch free himself in two pushes (with one hanging belay for a rest), and using an easier variation avoiding one of the cruxes, and assigned a grade of 5.13b.

In 2005, Steph Davis made the first female free ascent, with the grade at 5.13b.

== See also ==
- The Nose
