= Kevin Jorgeson =

American rock climber

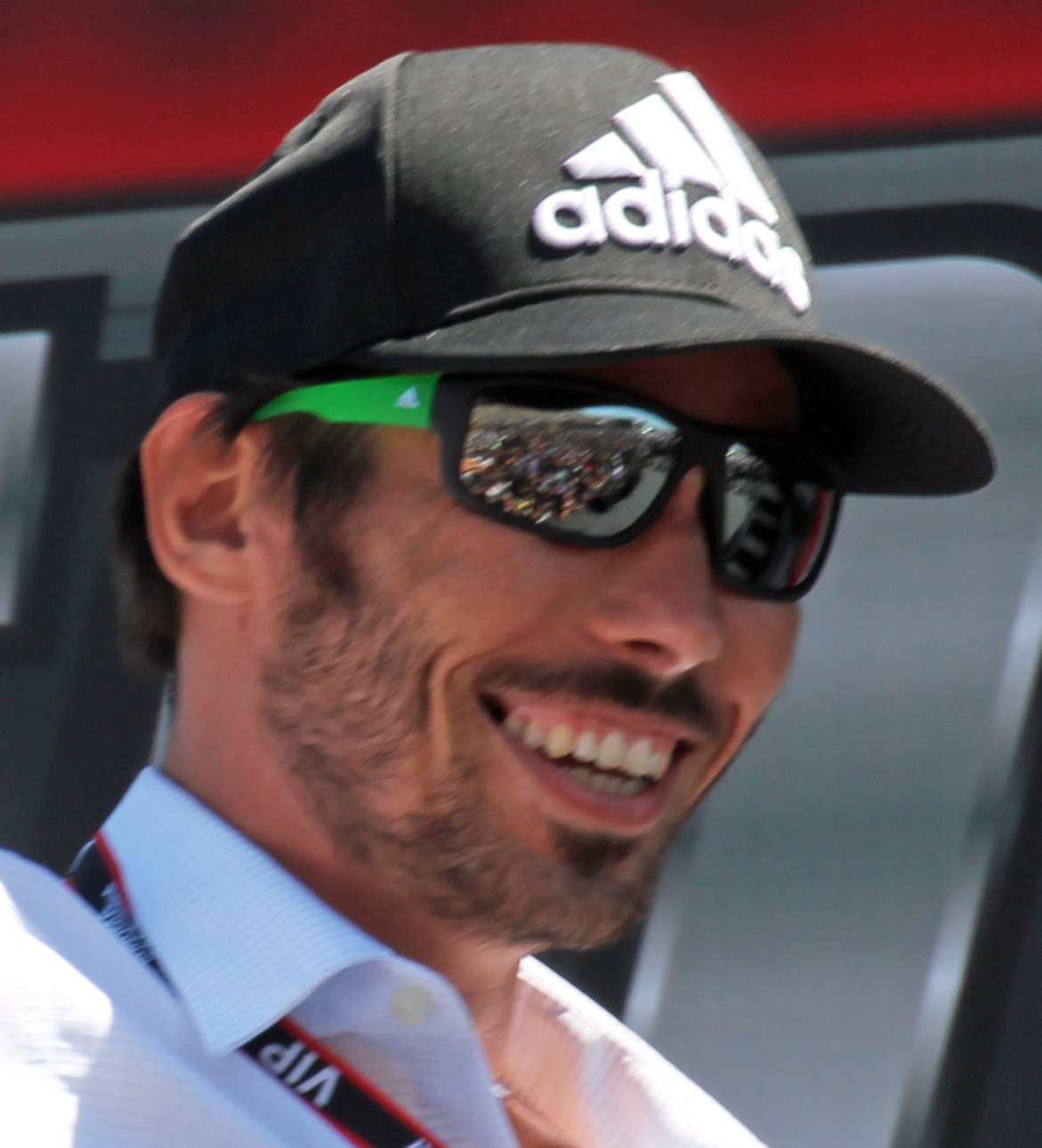
- Jorgeson at the 2015 Toyota/Save Mart 350

Personal information
- Nicknames: The Jörg, K. J.
- Nationality: American
- Born: October 7, 1984 (age 41) Santa Rosa, California
- Education: Maria Carrillo High School, University of California Berkeley
- Occupation: Rock climber

Climbing career
- Type of climber: Bouldering; Big wall climbing
- Known for: Free climbing The Dawn Wall

Kevin Jorgeson (born October 7, 1984) is an American rock climber. In 2015, with Tommy Caldwell, he successfully completed the first-ever free climb of The Dawn Wall on the southeast face of El Capitan in Yosemite National Park.

== Biography ==
Jorgeson was born to Eric and Gaelena Jorgeson. His father was an employee of the Santa Rosa Parks and Recreation Department, and helped to instill Kevin and his younger brother Matt with a love of the outdoors, and encouraged an 11-year-old Kevin to pursue climbing when an indoor climbing facility opened in the city. He began competing in international climbing contests at 16. Jorgeson is known for being able to free climb, using no equipment other than gear to protect from falling, and is well known for being able to high ball large boulders. He graduated from Maria Carrillo High School in 2003, and has returned to speak there various times. After high school, he went to the University of California Berkeley to study civil engineering, but he continued his passion of rock climbing.

Jorgeson and his climbing partner Tommy Caldwell were the first two climbers to successfully complete a free climb of The Dawn Wall on the southeast face of El Capitan in Yosemite National Park, completing the 3,000 ft climb between December 28, 2014, and January 14, 2015. The Dawn Wall is one of the most difficult big-wall climbs in the world, with multiple pitches rated 5.14 in the Yosemite Decimal System. The climb had been planned since shortly after the release of the documentary film Progression in 2009, in which Caldwell, who had previously free climbed other, easier routes on El Capitan, surveyed the Dawn Wall to consider if it was possible to free climb. Jorgeson wrote to Caldwell after seeing the film, and the two men began to plan out and practice for the ascent.

The Dawn Wall, a documentary following Jorgeson and Caldwell on their free climb of The Dawn Wall, was released on September 19, 2018. The documentary was directed by Josh Lowell and Peter Mortimer.

As of July 2019, Jorgeson was working toward opening a new climbing facility called Session, in Sonoma County, California. The project broke ground in 2018.

He is also a cofounder of 1Climb, an organization focused on introducing children to climbing.

In addition to climbing, Jorgeson performs as a keynote speaker for various corporate events, such as for The Gap, Samsung, and Alcon Laboratories.

== See also ==
- History of rock climbing
- List of first ascents (sport climbing)
