= Self rescue =

Self rescue is the process of resolving an emergency situation through the actions of the individual or group threatened by the emergency.

Self rescue can occur in any type of rescue, including:

- Avalanche rescue
- Climbing rescue
  - Crevasse rescue
- Confined space rescue
- Firefighter self rescue
- Submarine rescue
- Swiftwater rescue

== See also ==
- Escape breathing apparatus
  - Self-contained self-rescue device
- Lifeboat (shipboard)
- Simplified Aid For EVA Rescue, used in spacewalks
