= Rescue =

Operations for life saving, removal from danger and liberation from restraint

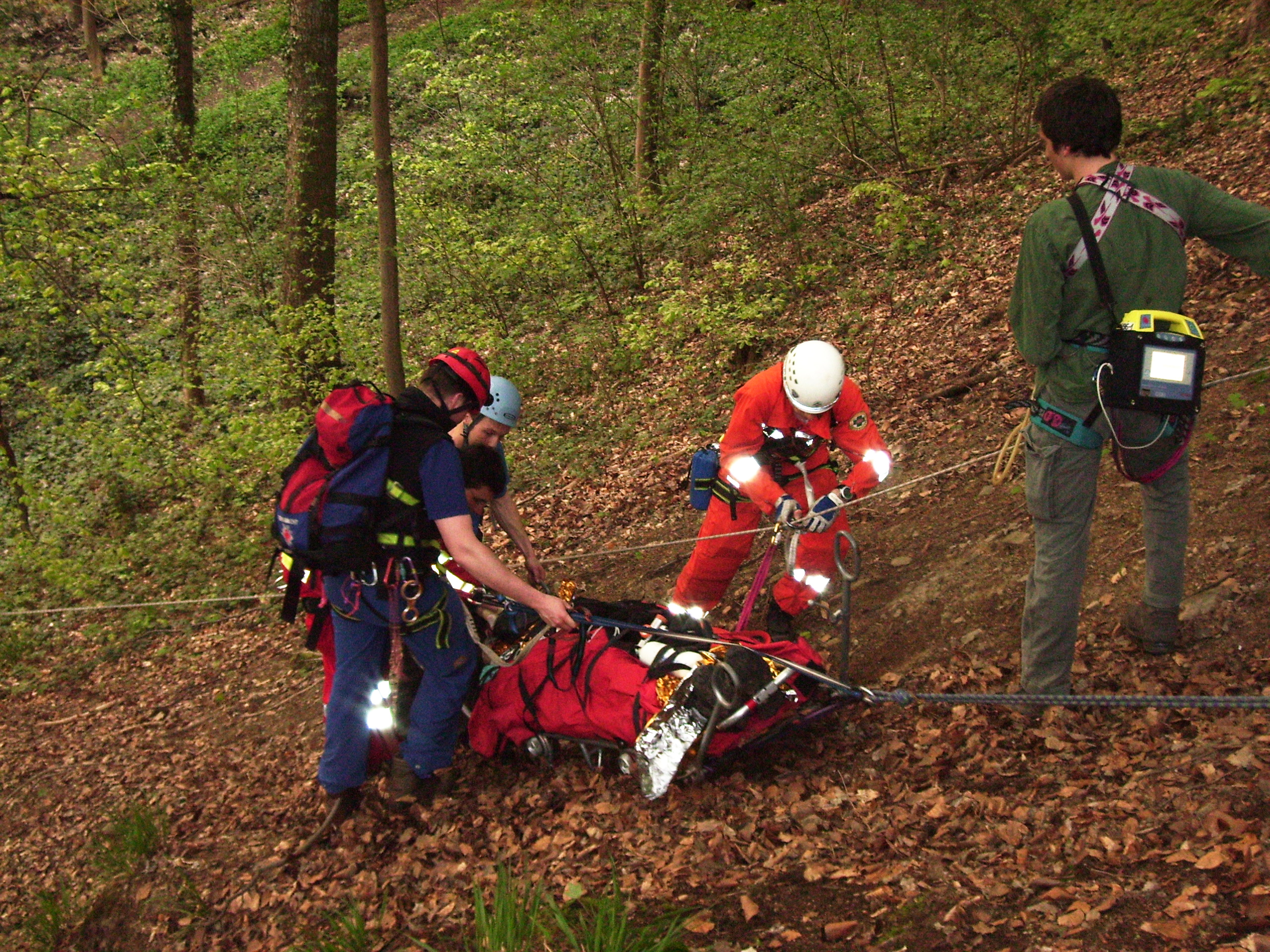
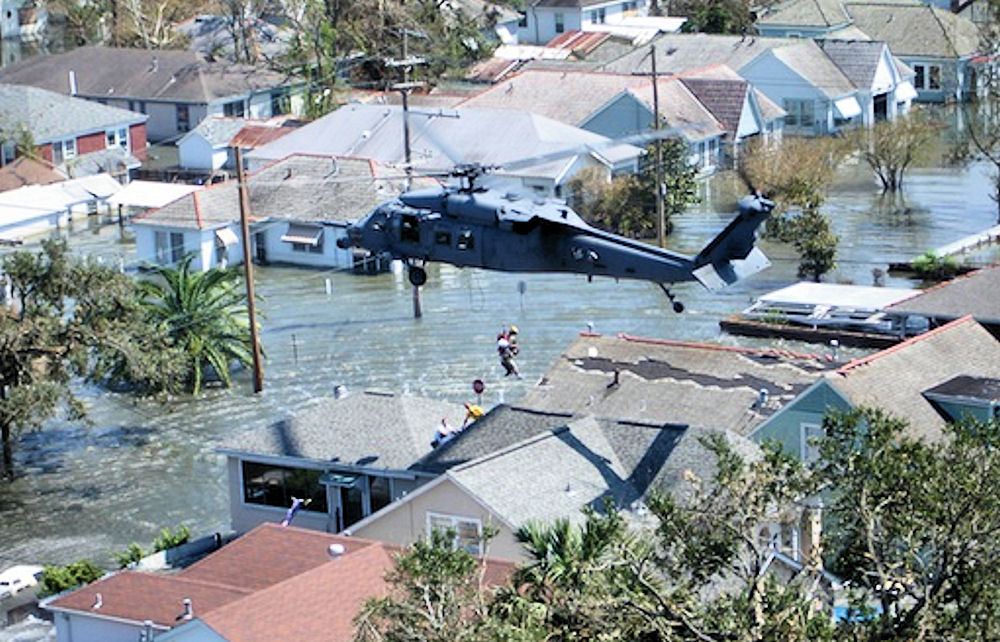
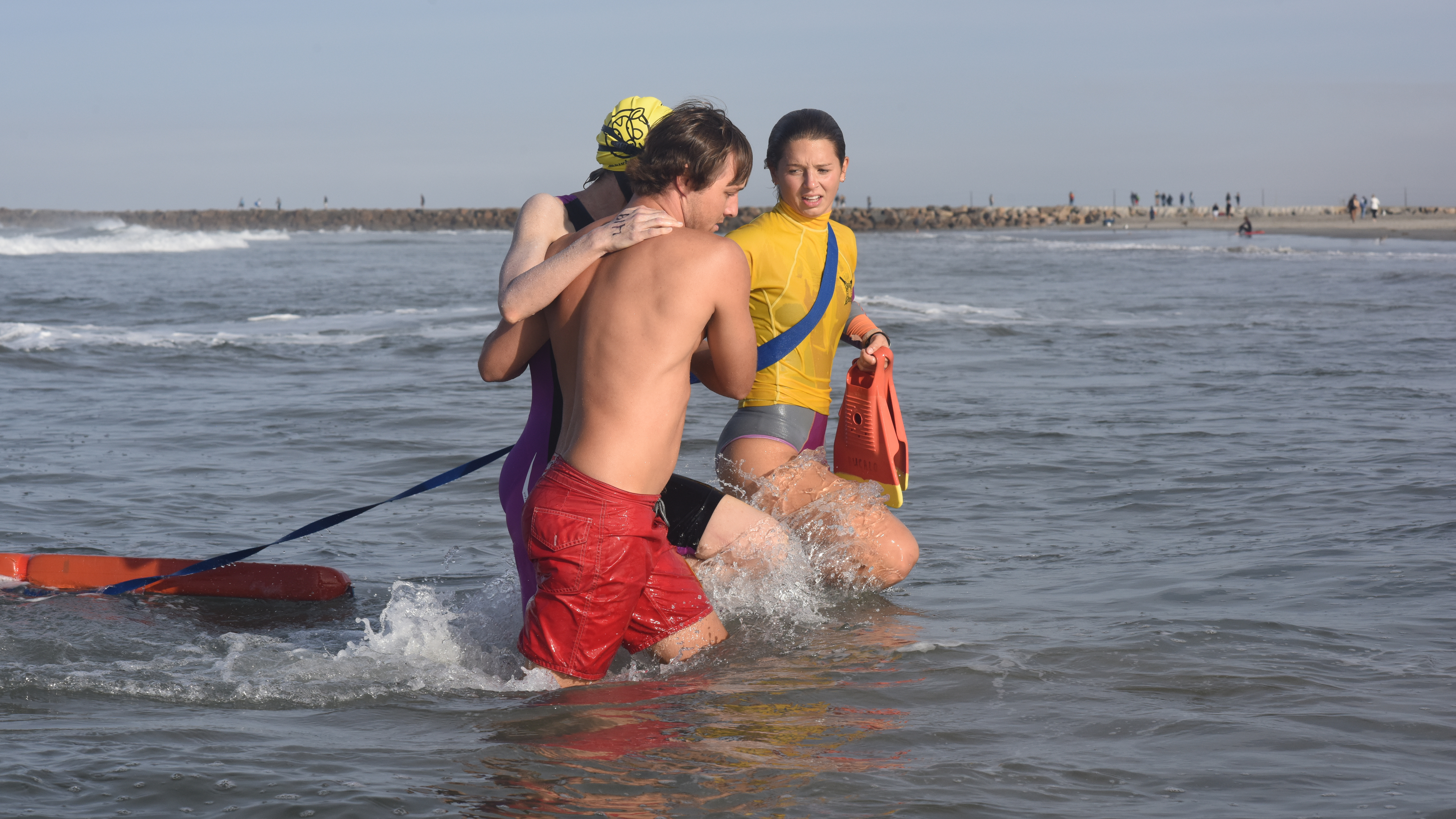
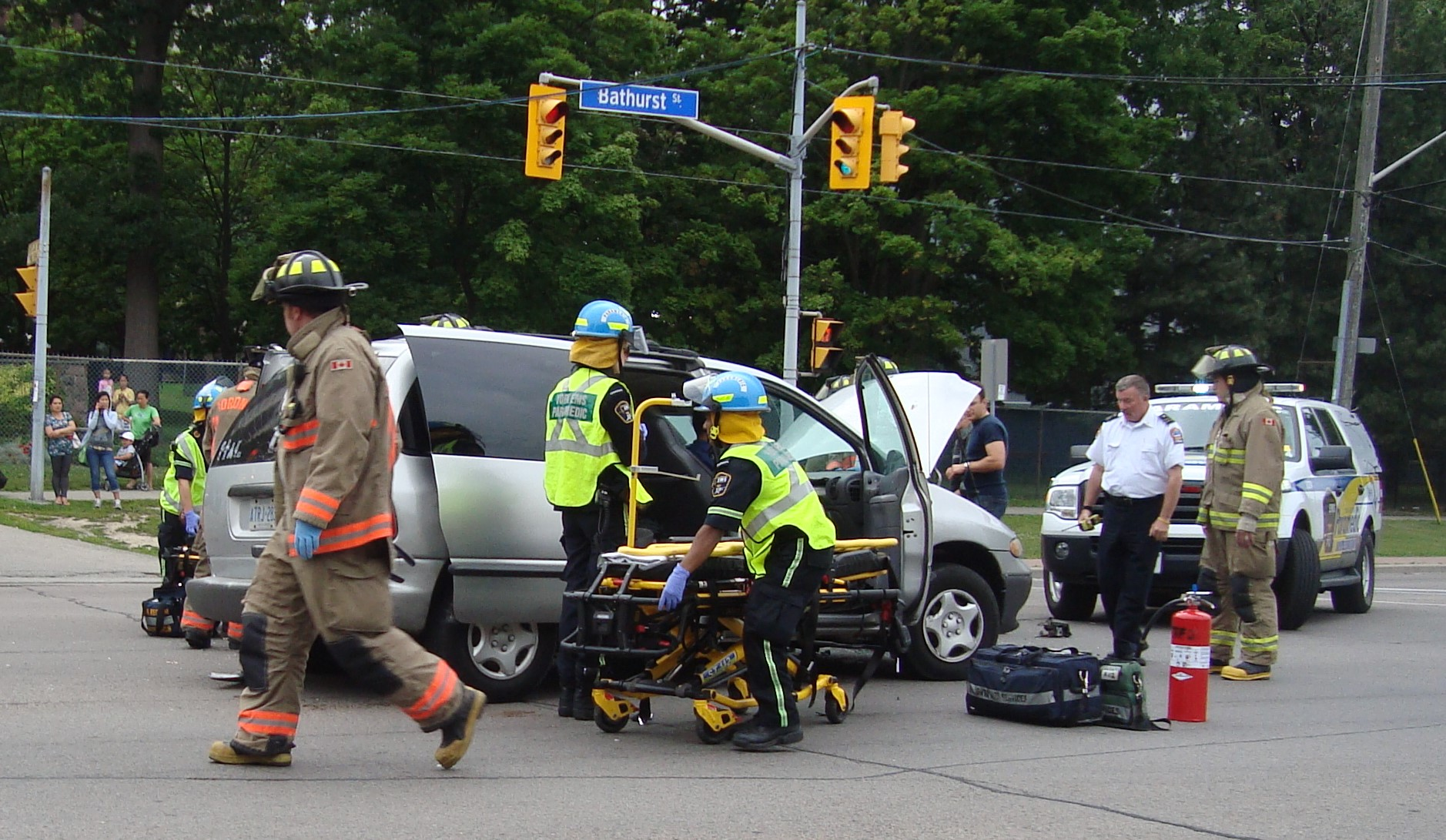
Rescue teams use a wide variety of specialised equipment and may need to operate in dangerous or precarious conditions.

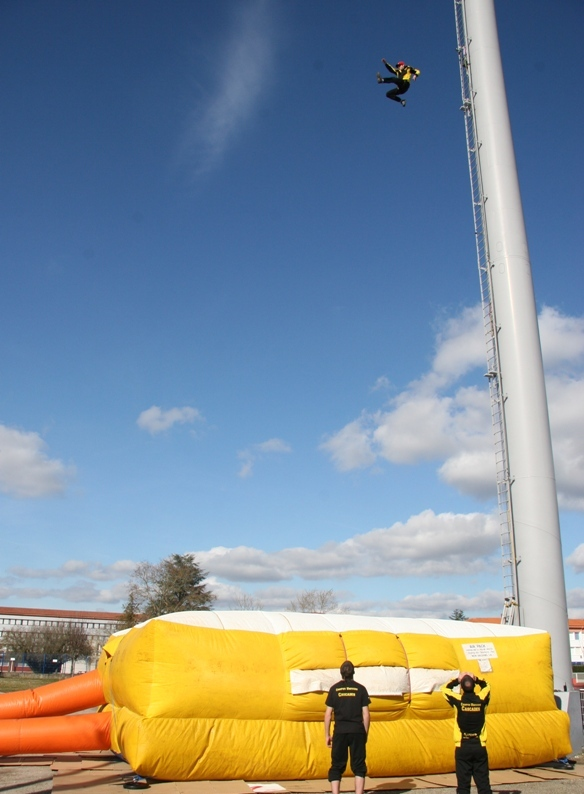
Rescue cushion

Rescue comprises responsive operations that usually involve the saving of life, removal from danger, liberation from restraint, or the urgent treatment of injuries after an incident. It may be facilitated by a range of tools and equipment necessary to deal with the specific circumstances.

Rescues may be necessary in a wide range of circumstances and environments, and specialised procedures have been developed for many of these. A rescue may also be performed on an ad hoc basis by the people who are available on site, using equipment available on site or assembled from available materials, particularly when the rescue is urgent or it is unlikely that specialist assistance will be available within a reasonable time. First aid medical attention is often closely associated with rescue, and may be a necessary part of a rescue.

Equipment used might include search and rescue dogs, mounted search and rescue horses, helicopters, the "jaws of life", and other hydraulic cutting and spreading tools used to extricate occupants from wrecked vehicles. Rescue operations may be supported by rescue vehicles operated by rescue squads, and at sea by lifeboats, rescue craft, salvage vessels and vessels of opportunity.

Additional types of rescue include Search and rescues which are often associated with rescues when persons are missing and likely to be in danger. Interspecies rescue, like that seen in open rescues, can occur when people rescue animals, when animals are part of a rescue team, and less often, when animals rescue people on their own initiative. Self-rescue, like that seen in climbing, is the process of getting out of an emergency by one's own efforts as an individual or a group.

== Definition and meaning ==
Merriam-Webster defines rescue as to free from confinement, danger, or evil, including to forcibly take someone or something from custody or relieve them from attack. Rescue also implies that the danger is imminent and the action is generally prompt or vigorous.

== Circumstances requiring rescue ==
Circumstances that lead to the necessity for rescue can develop due to bad luck, when the events were not foreseeable, duty, where there is known risk, but the person is legally or ethically obliged to take the risk, through voluntary assumption of reasonable risk in the pursuit of profit, knowledge, entertainment or other perceived reward, ignorance of risk foreseeable by a well informed person, denial of obvious risk, or intentional exposure to obvious risk.

== Ethics ==
It is a common belief that one has a duty to rescue other people from serious and imminent danger when the risk and cost to oneself is low. This duty is not easily explained as part of a broader consequentialist requirement to prevent harm, nor is it a duty of social justice owed between citizens as part of a social contract for mutual protection. It is rather a duty of justice in its own right that is based on the direct encounter between the rescuer and the persons in danger, which limits its scope. The situation may be complicated when there are more than one person in a position to contribute towards rescue efforts, and the responsibility is diffused amongst the group until it has been fairly allocated among those present, at which stage justice requires each to discharge their own share, though it would be considered a humanitarian duty to compensate for inadequate response by other persons for whatever reason.

As a general rule, a higher level of risk may be acceptable for actions more likely to result in successful rescue of a larger number of people, or of a person or persons of higher value to the rescuer.

== Law ==
Laws relating to rescue operations may constrain the activities of the rescuers by limiting the level of risk they may be exposed to under the direction of an employer (occupational safety legislation). The level of risk a competent person may voluntarily expose themself to may be significantly higher.

Liability for compensation for loss or injury during a rescue is a complex matter.

== Types of rescue operations ==
Some rescue operations require a high degree of competence and are usually performed by specialist rescue squads with appropriate training, either independent or part of larger organizations such as fire, police, military, first aid, or ambulance services. In the U.S., they are usually staffed by medically trained personnel as NFPA regulations require it.

Other rescues can be performed by any able bodied person who happens to be available at the time, using tools and equipment as may be available. There may be legal protection for non-specialist persons performing rescues for which they are not technically qualified in an emergency, in case they accidentally harm anyone or damage or trespass on property while attempting an apparently urgent rescue. Laws will vary depending on jurisdiction.

Special situations involving rescue, and specialised rescue equipment, include the following topics:

- Air-sea rescue, also known as Aeronautical and maritime search and rescue – Coordinated search and rescue of survivors at sea
- Cave rescue – Specialized field of wilderness rescue
- Combat search and rescue – Military personnel recovery from battlefield and enemy occupied areas
- Confined space rescue – Skilled technical rescue methods
- Diver rescue – Rescue of a distressed or incapacitated diver
- Hostage rescue – Rescue of a person seized by an abductor to compel action by another party
- Lifesaving – Act involving rescue, resuscitation, and first aid
- Mine rescue – Rescue of persons trapped after mining accidents
- Mountain rescue – Search and rescue activities
- Rope rescue – Type of technical rescue using rope
- Search and rescue – Search for and provision of aid to people who are in distress or imminent danger
- Self rescue (climbing) – Technique used in climbing
- Submarine rescue – Rescue of personnel from a disabled submarine
- Surf lifesaving – Beach surf lifesaving volunteers
- Surface water rescue – Rescue of a person who is at the surface of a body of water
- Swift water rescue – Rescue techniques for white water river conditions
- Technical rescue – Use of specialised tools and skills for rescue
- Urban search and rescue – Type of technical rescue operation
- Vehicle extrication – Process of removing a person trapped in a vehicle
- Wilderness search and rescue – Techniques applicable to wild areas

== Rescue equipment ==
Rescue equipment can be any equipment used for the purpose of rescue, but particularly equipment designed, manufactured, and marketed for rescue applications. Ropes and special equipment may be used to reach and remove living people and animals from difficult locations. Some equipment may be carried by people or vehicles intended to facilitate rescue if an incident occurs. This is usually a transponder to broadcast a distress signal allowing the location to be established.

- Airborne lifeboat – Lifeboat dropped by an aircraft to assist in rescue operations
- Avalanche cord – Locating device for people who have been buried by an avalanche
- Avalanche transceiver – Emergency locator rescue radio beacon
- Breeches buoy – Rescue device for transport along a taut rope
- Carley float – Liferaft design
- Controlled Impact Rescue Tool – Concrete breaching tool
- Dahlbusch Bomb – Mine emergency evacuation capsule
- Deep-submergence rescue vehicle – Submersible used for rescue of people from disabled submarines and submersibles
- Emergency position-indicating radiobeacon (EPIRB) – Radio transmitter to locate people in distress
- Fénix capsules – Emergency mine evacuation chambers
- Fulton surface-to-air recovery system – System used to retrieve persons on the ground using an aircraft
- Helicopter flight rescue system – System to carry people below a helicopter in flight
- Helicopter rescue basket – Equipment to transport people suspended below a helicopter
- Hydraulic rescue tool, also known as Jaws of life – Tool used by emergency rescue personnel to assist vehicle extrication of crash victims
- Jason's Cradle – Maritime rescue device made of stiffened netting
- Kendrick extrication device – Extrication brace for motor vehicle accidents
- Lifeboat (rescue) – Rescue craft used to attend a vessel in distress or survivors
- Lindholme Gear – British air-dropped sea rescue equipment
- Line thrower – Device that casts a line to a remote position
- Litter (rescue basket) – Basket-like stretcher device used to carry injured people
- McCann Rescue Chamber – Diving bell for rescuing submariners
- Personal Rescue Enclosure – Device for transporting astronauts between Space Shuttles in an emergency
- Search and rescue robot – Robot designed for rescuing people
- Rescue sling, also known as Rescue strop – Device used for lifting a casualty, a device made for lifting a casualty, commonly out of a body of water.
- Rescue tether, also known as Rescue rope – Equipment to facilitate a diver rescue
- Scoop stretcher – Device used for moving injured people
- Spinal board, also known as Trauma board – Device used in pre-hospital trauma care
- Submarine Rescue Diving Recompression System – Remotely operated vehicle for rescue of personnel from sunken submarines
- Submarine rescue ship – Support ship for submarine rescue and deep-sea salvage operations
- Throw bag, also known as throw line – Water rescue equipment

== Rescue personnel ==
- Aviation Survival Technician – United States Coast Guard rescue swimmer
- Para-SAR – Brazilian Air Force special operations search and rescue unit
- Proto team – South African term for a mine rescue team
- Public safety diver – Diver working in the public safety sector
- Rescue swimmer – Military occupation
- Rescue diver – Recreational scuba certification emphasising emergency response and diver rescue
- Rescue squad – Emergency service that provides technical rescue services
- Ski patrol – Services for the injured in ski area boundaries
- Stand-by diver – A member of a dive team who is ready to assist or rescue the working diver
- United States Air Force Pararescue – US Air Force personnel specializing in combat search and rescue

== See also ==
- Animal rescue – Rescue organization is dedicated to pet adoption
- Civil defense – Protection of citizens from disasters and military attack
- Emergency management – Dealing with all humanitarian aspects of emergencies
- Extraction (military) – Military operation to remove personnel
- Helping behavior – Voluntarily prosocial behaviour
- Hero – Person or character who combats adversity
- International Rescue Corps – Volunteer organisation involved in disaster rescue
