= Glissade (climbing) =

Technique in mountaineering

Mountaineers glissading down snow slopes
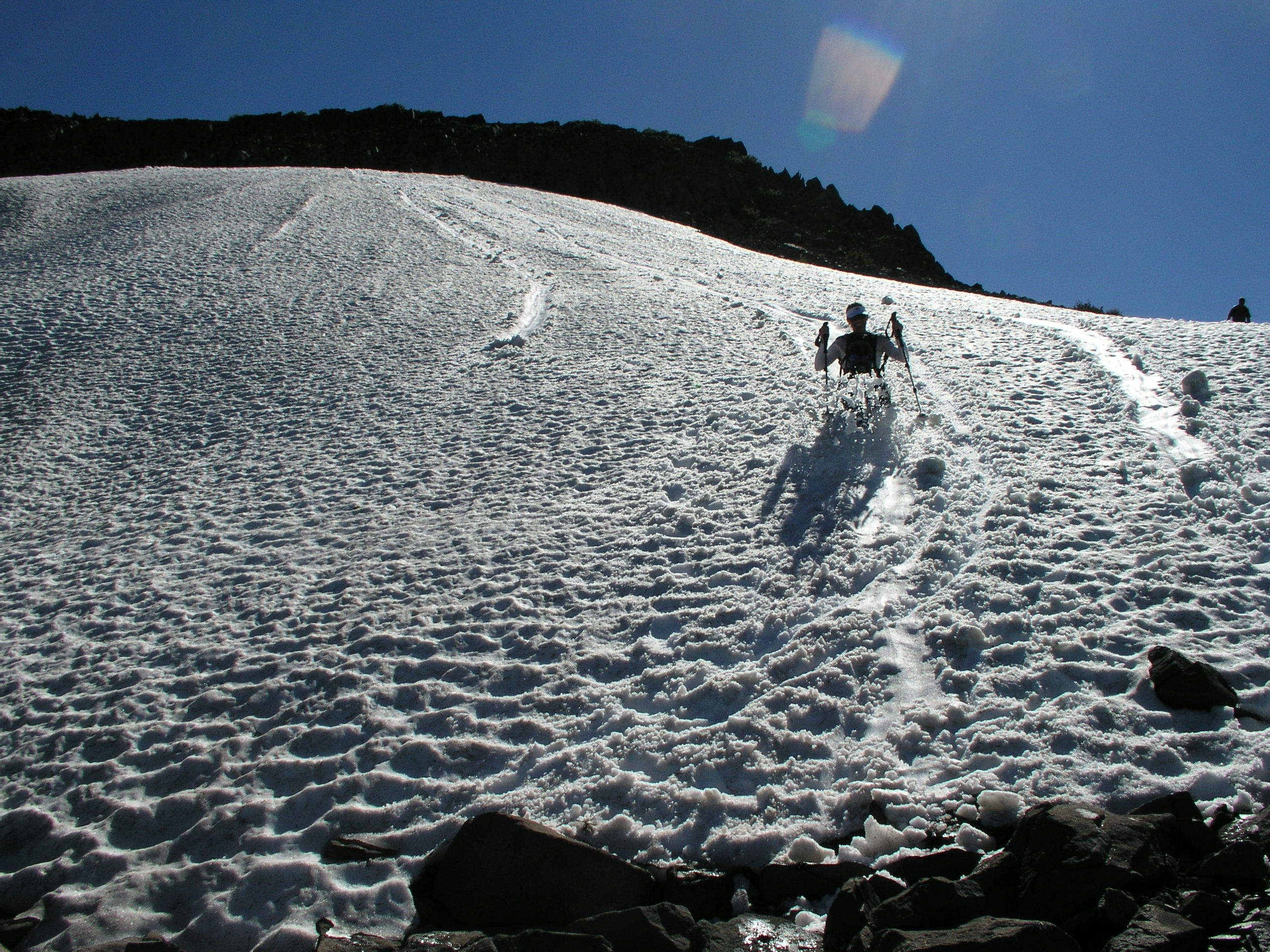
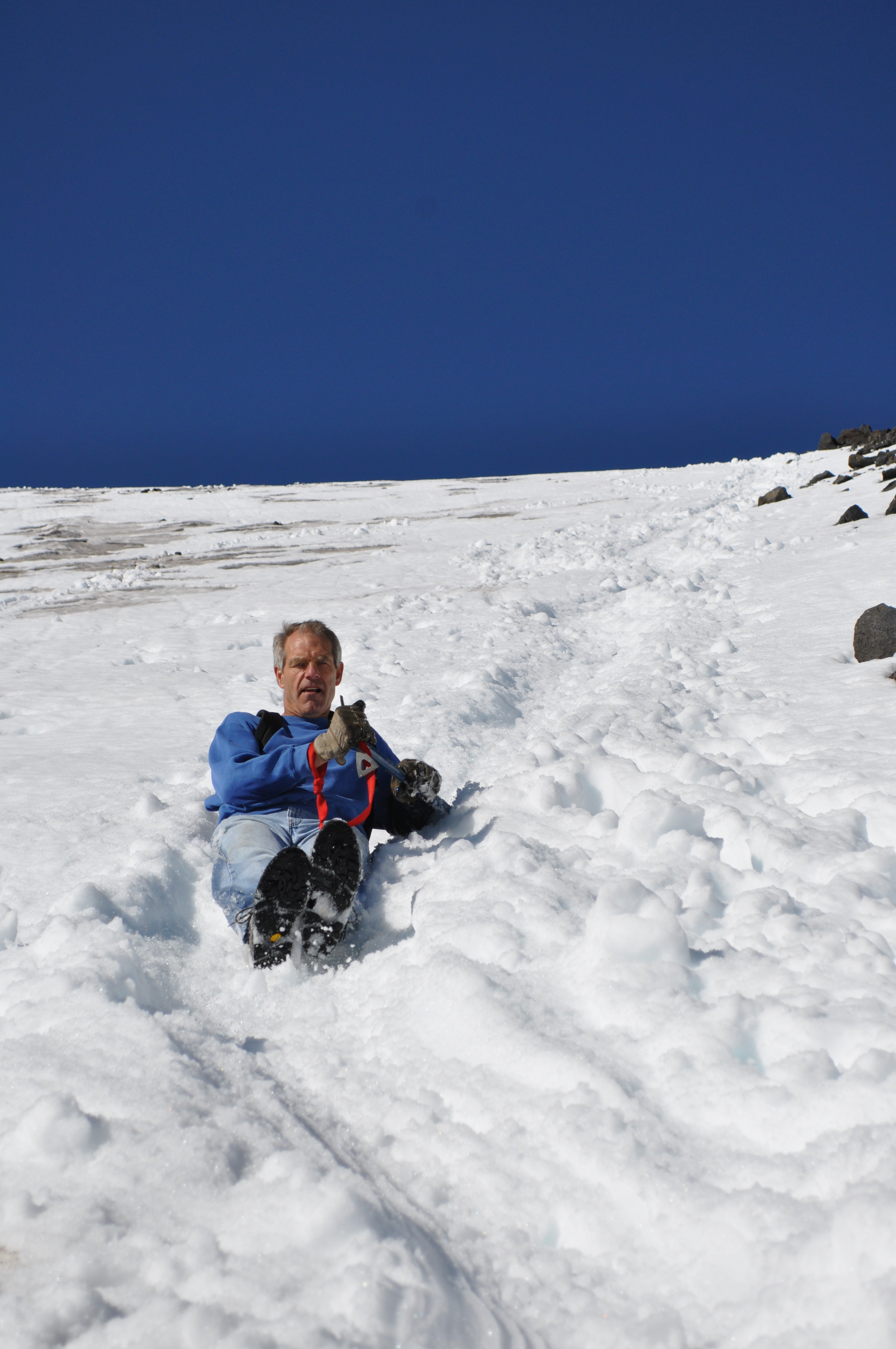

A glissade is a climbing technique mostly used in mountaineering and alpine climbing where a climber starts a controlled slide down a snow and/or ice slope to speed up their descent. Glissading is ideally done later in the day when the snow is softer.

Most glissading is done in a seated position (and ideally with a water-proof durable surface on which to sit and slide), with the legs bent to absorb shocks and bumps, and an ice axe held diagonally across the body to be in a position to perform a self-arrest if the glissade starts to get out of control. Crampons are explicitly not used while glissading as they can cause serious injury. Some climbers can glissade in a standing-up position (also called 'boot-skiing'), which has a greater risk and is unfeasible for longer slides.

As glissading is typically done on the descent of a climb when climbers are tired, it can lead to serious injuries. Glissading with crampons is particularly dangerous and can lead to broken ankles, but tired climbers sometimes forget to take them off. High-speed glissading is also not advised and can make any self-arrest more difficult and also dangerous (e.g. such as dislocated shoulders); it can also result in uncontrolled falls onto more dangerous terrain, and has been known to set off avalanches under certain conditions. Glissading near crevasses (e.g. a glacier or a bergshrund) is also very dangerous, and even more so when attempted as a rope team.

== See also ==
- Crevasse rescue
- Self rescue (climbing)
- Glossary of climbing terms
