= CIRT =

CIRT may refer to:

- Critical Incident Response Team, Australian police unit
- International Centre for Theatre Research (Centre International de Recherche Théâtrale), theatrical research and production company in Paris
- Controlled Impact Rescue Tool, a concrete breaching device manufactured by Raytheon
- National Chamber of the Radio and Television Industry (Cámara Nacional de la Industria de Radio y Televisión), Mexican association of broadcasters
- Carbon Ion Radiotherapy, see Particle therapy
