= Glissade =

Glissade may mean:

- glissade (climbing), a way to descend a snow-covered slope
- glissade (dance move), a move in some dances such as the galop
- glissade (ballet), a ballet dance move
- glissade (music), the French name for a portamento in music

== See also ==
- Glissando
