= Franz Rautek =

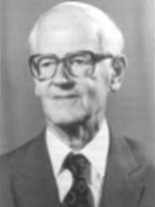
Franz Rautek

Franz Rautek (1902–1989) was a martial arts teacher in Vienna, Austria. He is best known as the inventor of the rescue maneuver named after him. This maneuver allows unconscious people to be moved from areas of danger with limited effort on part of the rescuer, even if they are much smaller than the victim.

== Rautek maneuver ==
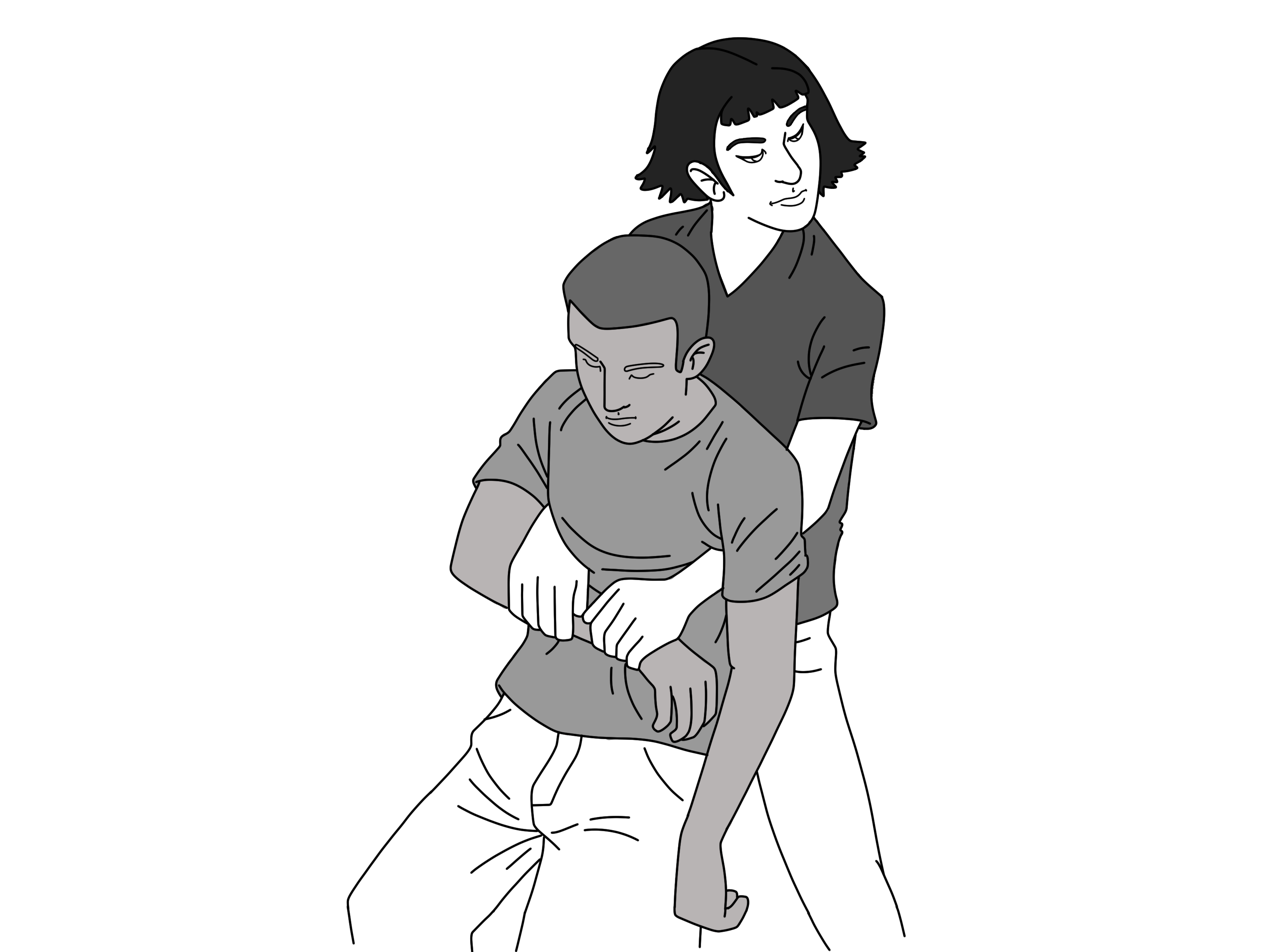
Illustration of the Rautek maneuver in progress

A person applying the Rautek maneuver brings the victim into a sitting position, making sure that both legs are free. The rescuer approaches the victim from behind, putting both their arms under their armpits. Both hands then grab one of the lower arms of the victim with all fingers and the thumbs being placed on top of that lower arm and parallel to each other (so called monkey grip, ). This avoids injury to the ribs of the victim by the thumb of the rescuer. The victim's arm should now be horizontal and pressed across their chest. Gently lifting the upper body of the victim by the grabbed arm and supporting them with the rescuer's thigh, the victim can then be dragged backwards. The victim contacts the ground with buttocks and legs, which are not "soft parts". If a second rescuer is available, they can carry the legs.

This maneuver still presents dangers for victims with spinal injuries or osteoporosis, which is why victims should only be moved if the situation absolutely requires it (such as in case of fire or nearby high-speed traffic). Rescuers are advised to move slowly and deliberately to avoid self-injury.
