= Alpine companies =

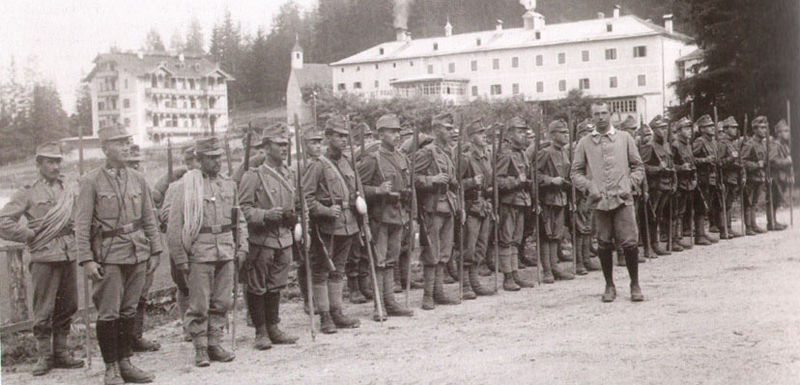
Alpine company on parade

The Alpine companies (German: Hochgebirgskompanien) were specialized mountain infantry troops that were part of the Austro-Hungarian land forces during the First World War.

== History ==
Because normal forces could not be employed on reconnaissance and combat tasks in the high mountains of the Alps, in 1916 Alpine Streif companies (Streifkompanien) were established. They were renamed in 1917 to Hochgebirgskompanien ("Alpine companies" or, literally "high mountain companies"). The members of these companies represented all the ethnic groups of the monarchy together. They all had previous Alpine experience, either as a result of their agricultural experience or as Alpine tourists before the war, and were specifically trained for fighting in the mountains. The specially selected officers and men of the mountain companies were issued with Alpine equipment, and were intended, and in practice were able, to overcome natural obstacles even in the most difficult terrain.

== Mission ==
The mission of this specialist force (or Schwarm) was to secure and maintain climbing paths and routes in high-Alpine terrain, as well as to make military supply routes practicable. For this, they were equipped with wire cables, rope ladders, iron bars and other equipment.

== Organisation ==
An Alpine company was divided into a company HQ, three rifle platoons and a machine gun platoon equipped with two 07/12 machine guns, three to four mountain guide patrols, two telephone patrols and a technical section.

The replacement of personnel came from the units available in the respective branch of the army. Those battle casualty replacement battalions (Ersatzbataillone) from which the majority of the men in the individual companies originated, were designated as a replacement cadres; as a result they could be units in the Common Army or the k.k. Landwehr.

== Equipment ==
The personal equipment of a soldier in the Alpine companies consisted of: rucksack, alpenstock, snowshoes (Schneereifen), snow goggles, mountaineering boots, Krötteln (crampons) and, in accordance with regulations of 1918 for the equipment and clothing in mountain warfare: a pair of ten-pointed crampons, full ski equipment, avalanche cord, a pair of shoe covers, a pair of overmitts, a windcheater, windproof trousers and a snowsuit or – in its absence – a snow jacket.

The Alpine companies were among the most highly decorated units of the imperial forces. Several members were awarded the Military Order of Maria Theresa, for example, Lieutenant Peter Scheider of the 17 Alpine Coy for the capture of the Monticello Ridge on the Tonale Pass (together with the 28 Coy under Lieutenant Toni Kaaserer) in the summer of 1918 during Operation Avalanche (Unternehmen Lawine).

== See also ==
- Imperial-Royal Mountain Troops

== Literature ==
- "Truppendienst", Austrian Federal Army, Chapter 292, Issue 4/2006.
