= Self-arrest =

Technique in mountaineering

Mountaineers practicing self-arrests on snow slopes

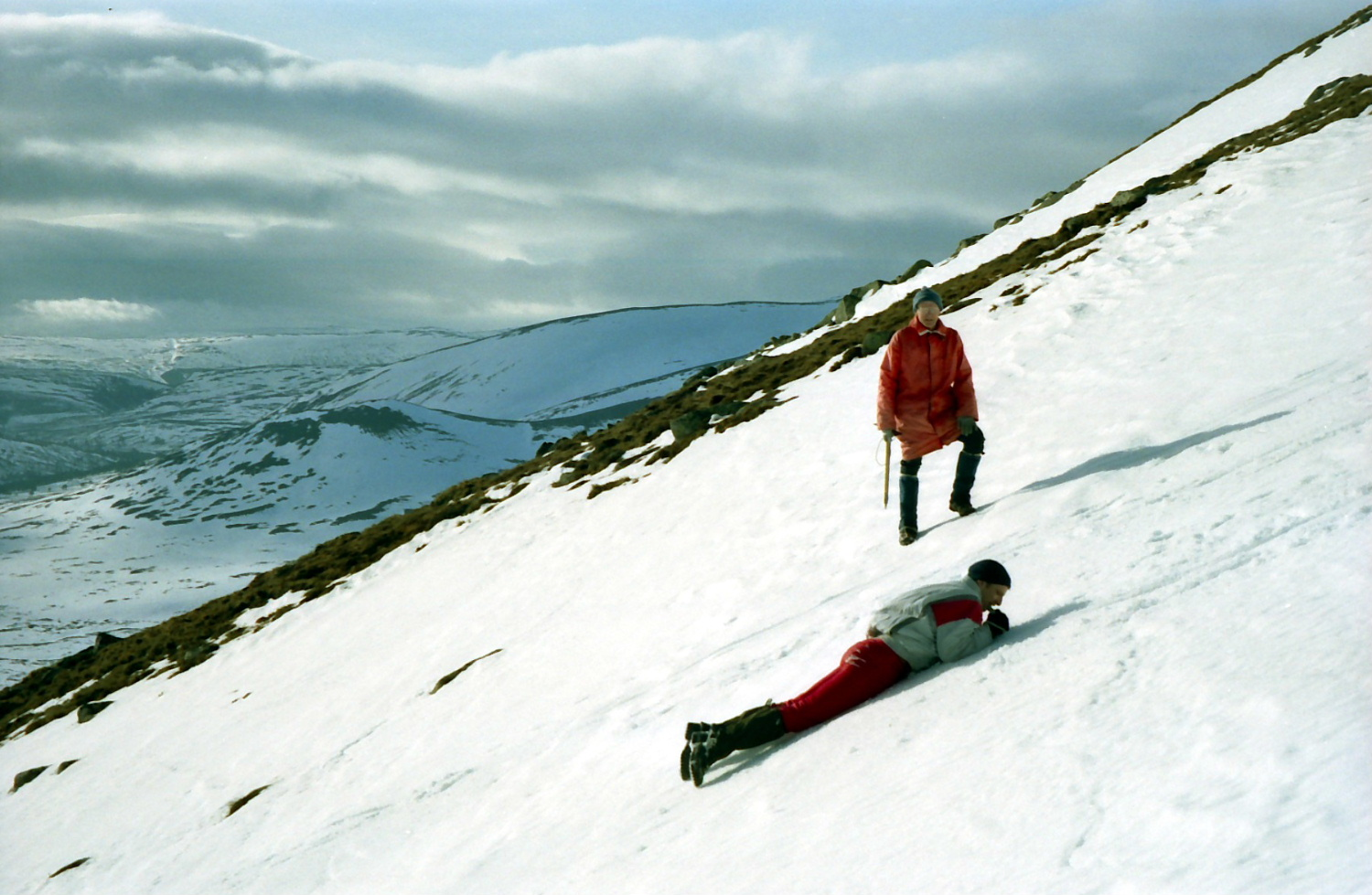
Climber has rolled onto their stomach and have embedded the pick into the snow

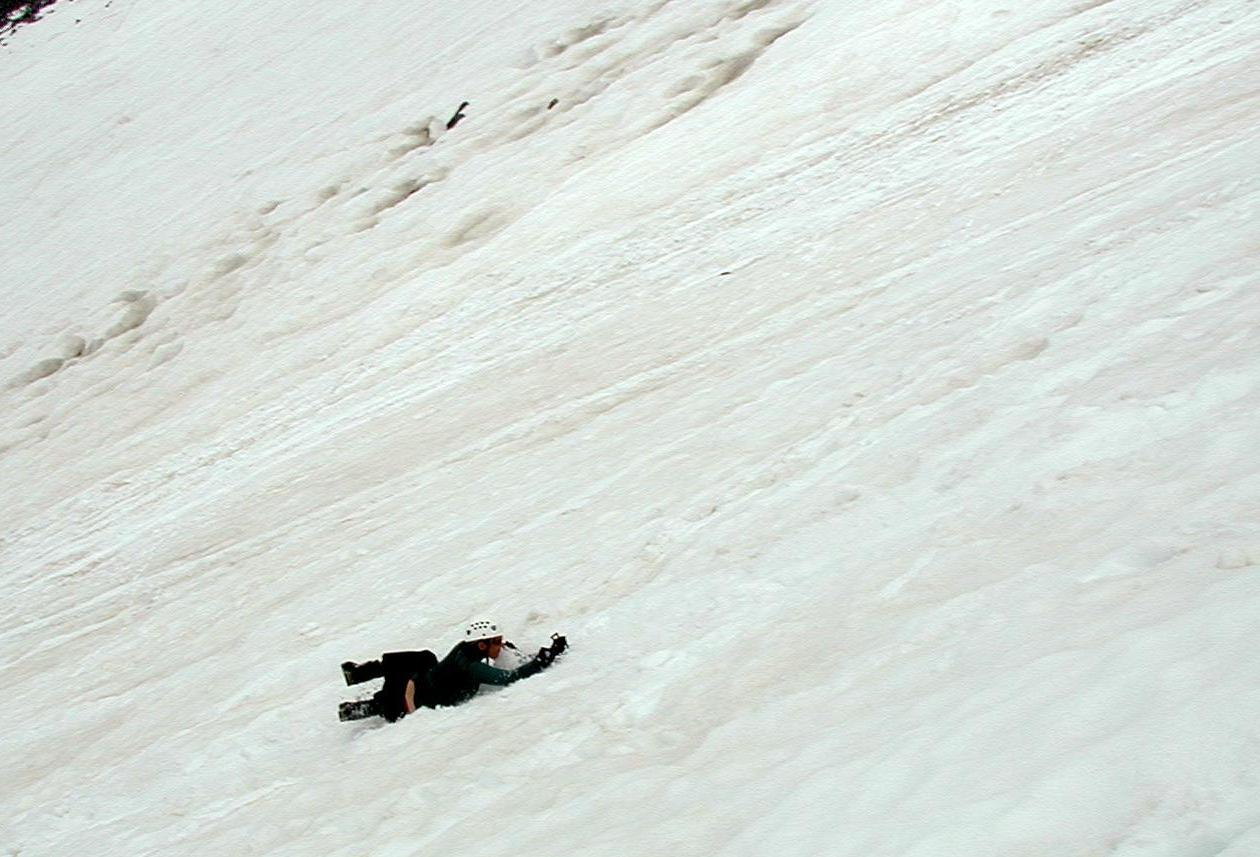
Climber in the act of trying to embed the pick while rolling onto their stomach

The self-arrest is a climbing technique mostly used in mountaineering and alpine climbing where a climber who has fallen and is sliding uncontrollably down a snow or ice-covered slope 'arrests' their fall by themselves by using their ice axe and their crampons.

There are many ways to self-arrest depending on the climber's body position while falling (e.g. falling head-first and/or falling on their back etc.,) but they mostly involve the climber quickly digging the pick of their ice axe into the slope (with the adze of the axe at their shoulder and the axe held at either end diagonally across their body), rolling over onto their stomach so that they can use their full body weight to push down harder on the pick, and simultaneously digging the front-points of their crampons into the slope.

Practicing the 'self-arrest' is a core skill set for mountaineers in snow and ice-covered terrain. On steeper ground such as in couloirs (particularly ice-covered), and on glaciers where a rope team member falling into a crevasse is about to drag the other members into the crevasse with them, it is critical that the climber(s) can execute the 'self-arrest' quickly and decisively—ideally performed as an instinctive and instantaneous movement without having to think about how to do it—before speed builds up with more serious consequences.

== See also ==
- Crevasse rescue
- Glissade (climbing)
- Glossary of climbing terms
