= Avalanche cord =

Locating device for people who have been buried by an avalanche

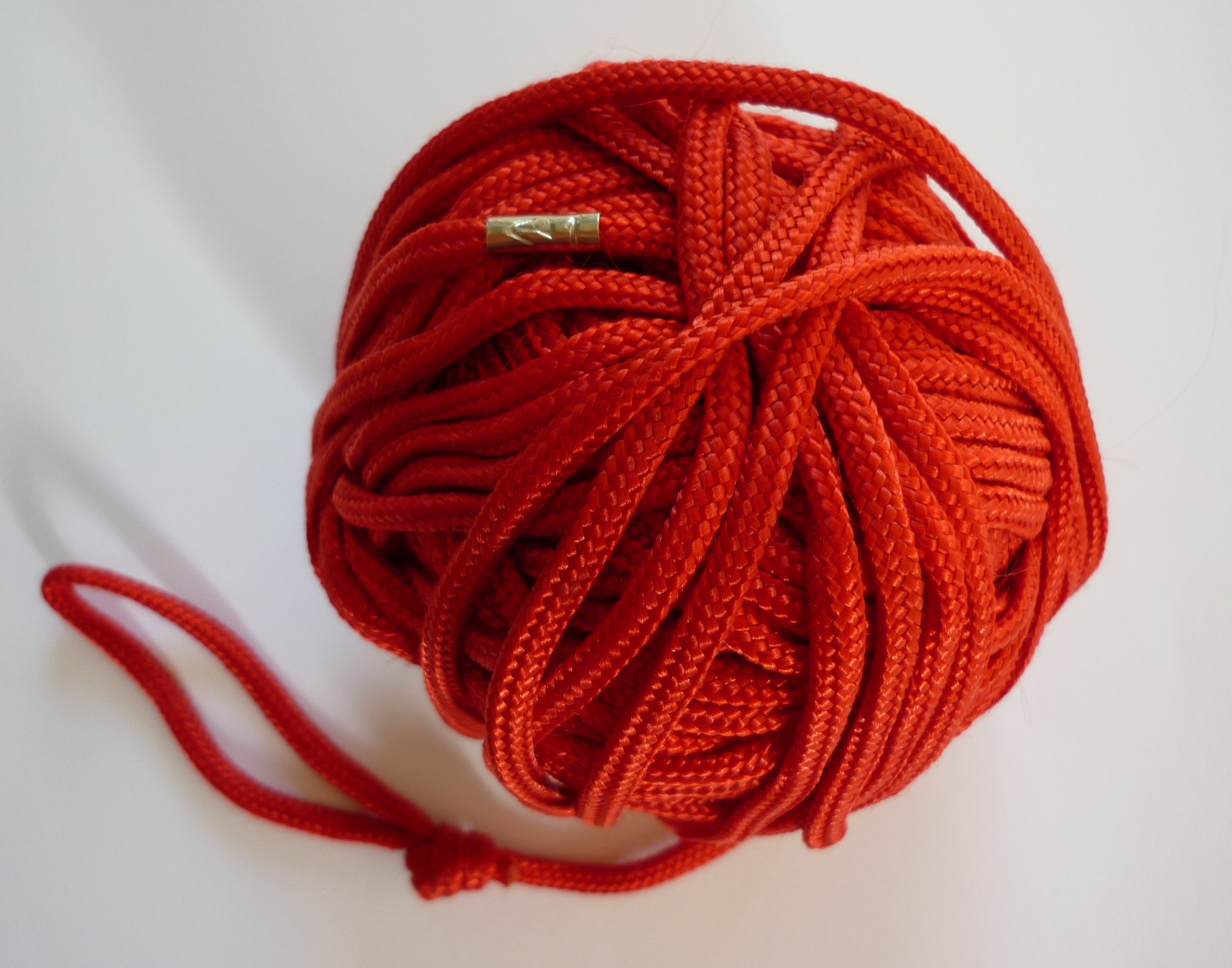
Avalanche cord

An avalanche cord (German: Lawinenschnur) is an old form of person locating device designed to enable people who have been buried by an avalanche to be rapidly located and rescued.

== Function ==
An avalanche cord is 20-25 metres long and about 3.5 mm thick. It is usually made of red cotton with direction arrows positioned at metre intervals, each with the length marked in metres, and 10 cm long loops. It is wound into a ball. The ski mountaineer or climber ties the loop with the 1-metre mark (arrow against himself) around his waist. If there is a risk of avalanches he throws the ball out and pulls the avalanche cord along the snow behind him. If he is buried by an avalanche, there is a relatively good chance that part of the avalanche cord will be visible on top of the avalanche slide, thanks to its length. Rescuers can determine from the direction arrows, in which direction and how many metres they must dig and are then able to follow the cord to the victim.

== History ==
The use of avalanche cords goes back to the early 20th century and a Bavarian mountaineer named Eugen Oertel, and in some parts of the world is called an Oertal Cord.

First World War sign warning of avalanches and the need to use avalanche cords

Initially used as part of the personal mountaineering equipment of the Austro-Hungarian Alpine companies in the First World War. They were prescribed around 1915 for the Austrian mountain troops in the war in the mountains. Thanks to more recent developments such as avalanche transceivers the classic avalanche cord is rarely used today. The functional principle of the avalanche cord continues to be used and developed, however, in the avalanche ball.

== See also ==
- Avalanche rescue
