= Throw bag =

Water rescue equipment

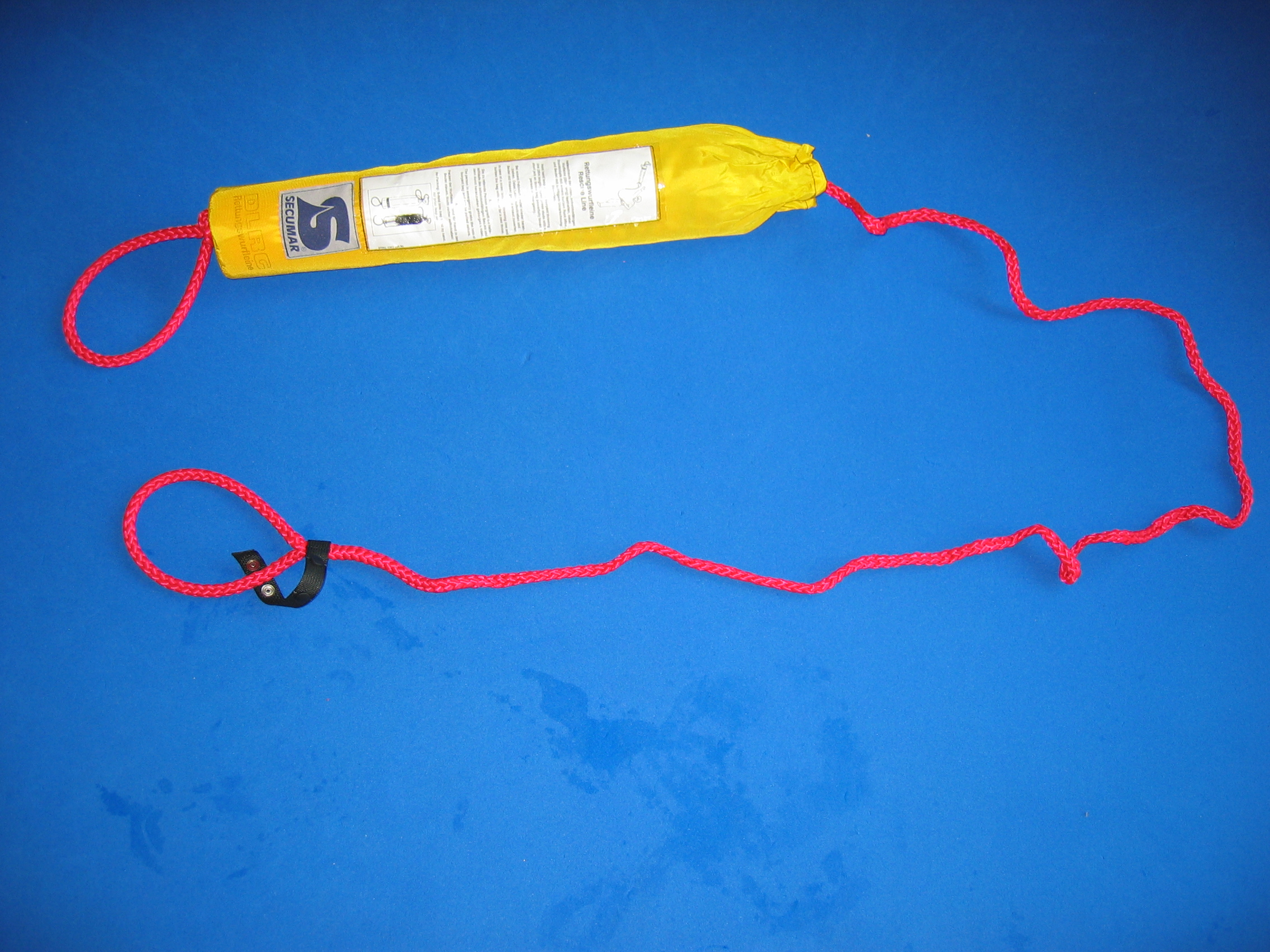
A throw bag

A throw bag or throw line is a rescue device with a length of rope stuffed loosely into a bag so it can pay out through the top when the bag is thrown to a swimmer.

A throw bag is standard rescue equipment for kayaking and other outdoor river recreational activities.

A throw bag is used to rescue someone who is swimming down a river after capsizing their kayak or canoe, but can also be used for gear retrieval and for climbing during portages.

== Swimmer rescue ==
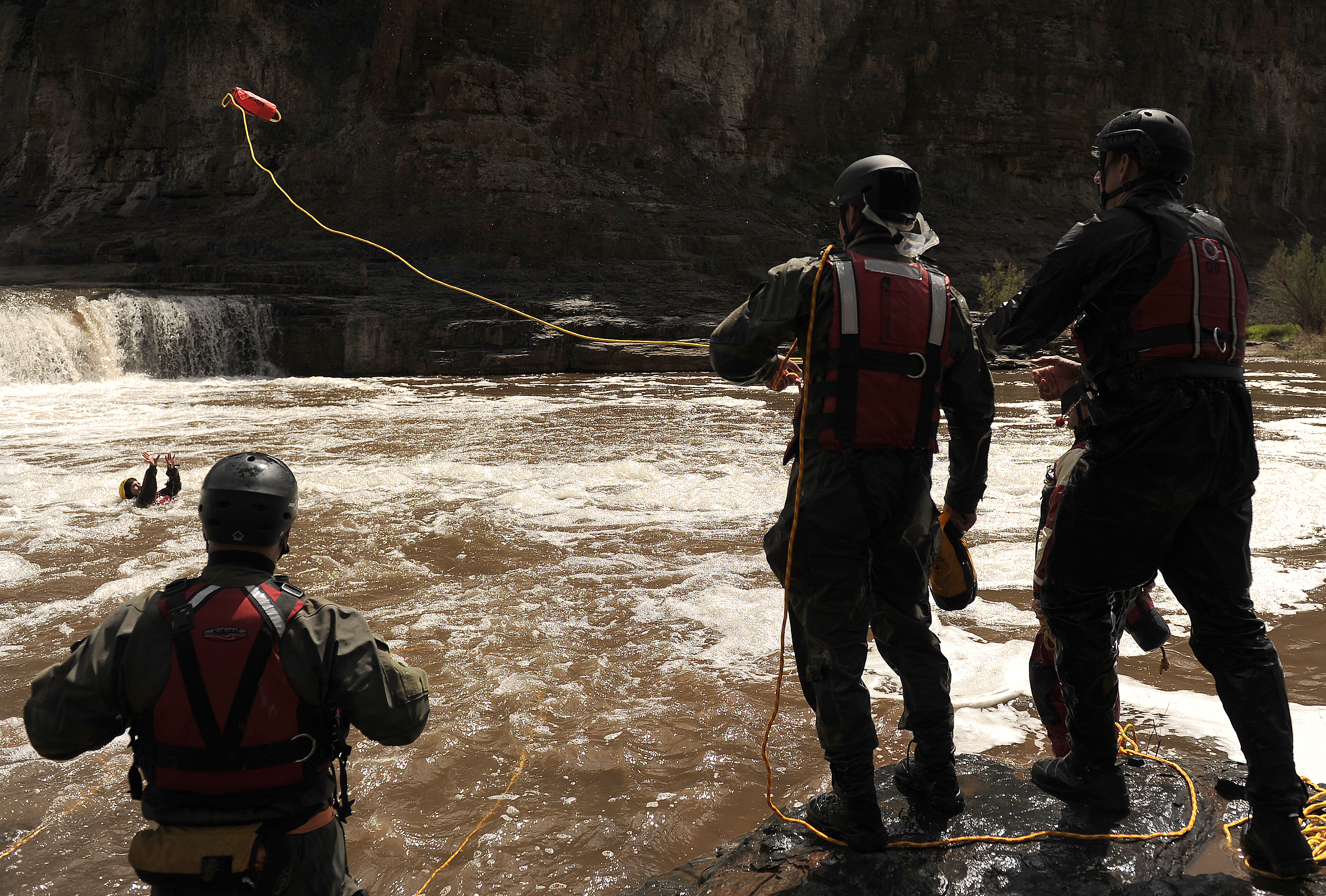
Usage of a throw bag in a Swift water rescue exercise

- Recognition – The party with the throw bag needs to see the swimmer and retrieve the throw bag.
- Preparation – Quickly the 'bagger' needs to pay out about a meter of rope from the mouth of the bag, and try to get a partner to stand behind them holding onto them, preferably by the life jacket. The bagger, if they have time, should take the meter of revealed rope and take it around their back so they can hold the tail of the rope, and the line feeding into the bag with their body in the loop, resting the rope on their back.
- Communication – The 'bagger' needs to communicate to the swimmer that they are going to throw a rope, as the rope is best visible in the air, and can be lost by the swimmer when it is in the water. Shouting "rope rope rope" is a common industry standard by rafting companies.
- The Throw – The 'bagger' will grasp the meter of played out line in their off hand, and throw the bag either in an underhand or overhand fashion aiming to land the bag past the head of the swimmer, taking care to lead them as they will be moving downstream during the throw.
- Anchoring – If the rope is caught by the swimmer the thrower should never anchor themselves or you run the risk of ripping the rope out of the swimmers hands. The thrower should move down the gravel bar or river bank to allow a controlled tensioning of the rope and pendulum motion for the swimmer to swing to shore. The thrower should always choose a safe location to make the throw, but avoid creating an anchor other than what is needed for the safety of the thrower. The bagger or the swimmer should NOT wrap the rope around their hand, neck, or body.
- Swimmer position – The swimmer upon handling the rope needs to turn onto their back with their head pointed upstream and the rope going over their shoulder as they hold it unwrapped in both hands.
- The pendulum effect – On a straight river the swimmer will be naturally pushed by the current to the shore they have been bagged from. When they get to shore the bagger can start to pull them in, hand over hand.

== Gear Rescue – V Drag ==
Applications of the throw bag to rescue gear in a river. Have parties on both sides of a river that is smaller than the length of the line. Throw a bag from one side of the river to the other with both parties holding an end. Attach a person who has a lifejacket with a strong swimmer harness and attach them to the line. Using angles, position them, the gear, and lower them down for rescue with either a pin kit or basic retrieval.
