= Cámara Nacional de la Industria de Radio y Televisión =

Mexican broadcasters' association

National Chamber of the Radio and Television Industry
- Cámara Nacional de la Industria de Radio y Televisión
- Abbreviation: CIRT
- Formation: November 15, 1941
- Type: Trade association
- Legal status: active
- Purpose: Represent private broadcasters in Mexico
- Headquarters: Mexico City
- Region served: Mexico
- President: José Antonio García Herrera
- Website: cirt.mx

The National Chamber of the Radio and Television Industry (Spanish: Cámara Nacional de la Industria de Radio y Televisión, CIRT) is the broadcasters' association of Mexico. The CIRT represents all commercial broadcasters in the country. Its current president is broadcast lawyer José Antonio García Herrera, who has headed the organization since 2021.

== History ==
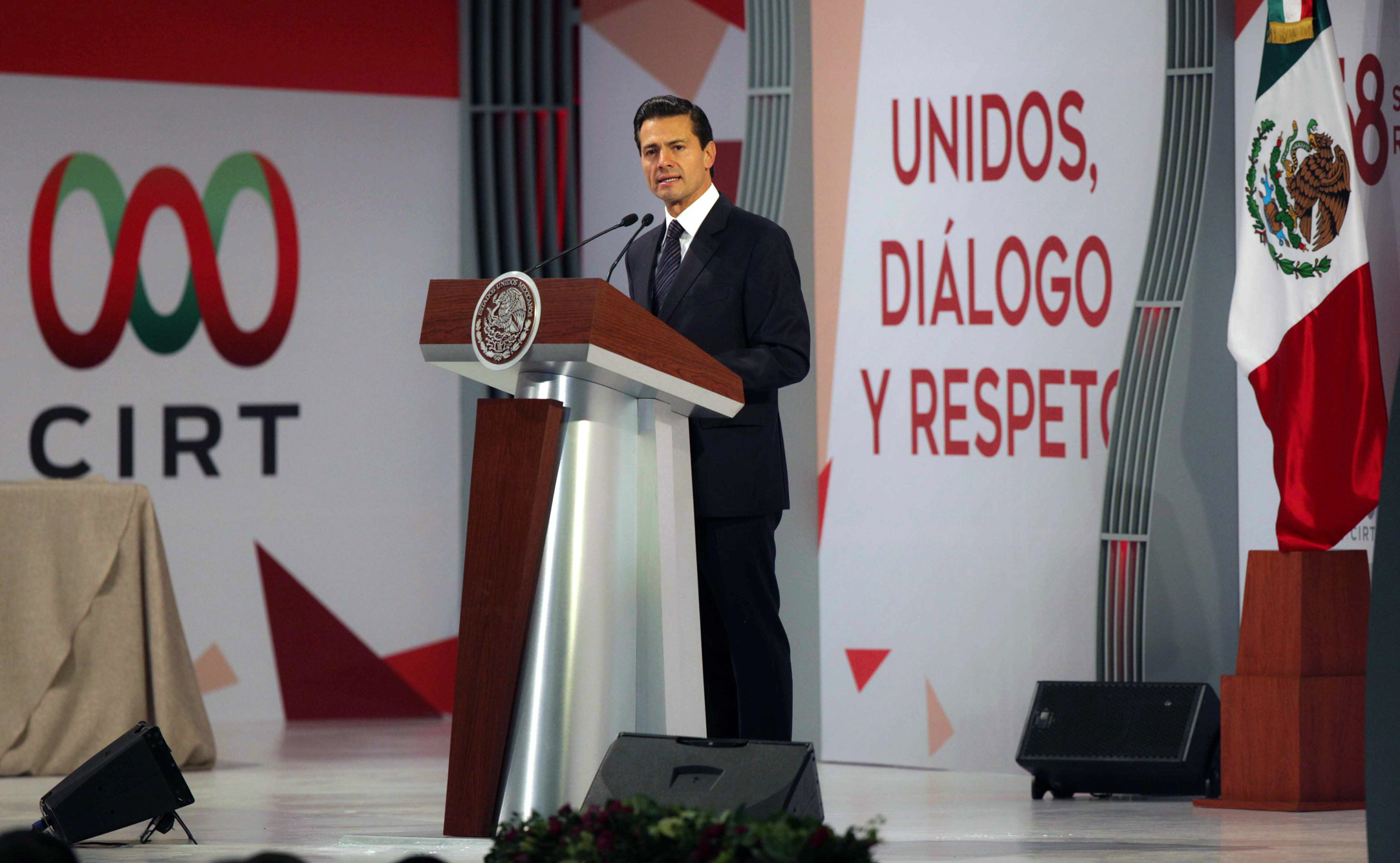
President Enrique Peña Nieto speaks at the 58th National Radio and Television Week in 2016

The first broadcasters' association in Mexico was the Asociación Mexicana de Estaciones Radiodifusoras (Mexican Association of Broadcasting Stations), soon changed to the Asociación Mexicana de Estaciones Radiodifusoras Comerciales (Mexican Association of Commercial Broadcasting Stations), which was formed in 1937. In late 1941, the Cámara Nacional de la Industria de Radiodifusión (National Chamber of the Broadcasting Industry) was formally constituted, with Emilio Azcárraga Vidaurreta as its first president. The relationship proved critical for broadcasters who, because of World War II, could not obtain parts for their equipment from American suppliers; Azcárraga's connections to RCA Victor made it possible for small stations to obtain parts by way of affiliating with his Radio Programas de México.

Historically, the CIRT has been aligned with larger broadcasters. In 1953, the CIRT supported a move that allowed large Mexico City radio stations to establish nationwide repeaters, adversely affecting local stations. It supported the Televisa Law in 2006, even when many of the association's smaller members would have been harmed by a measure that benefited Televisa and TV Azteca. Likewise, it opposed the Federal Telecommunications Institute's decision to auction new radio and TV stations in 2016.

== National Radio and Television Week ==
The first National Broadcasting Week, now National Radio and Television Week (Semana Nacional de Radio y Televisión), was organized by the CIR in 1958. The organization changed its name and formally began including television broadcasters in 1970 after an internal restructuring.

In 2017, the National Radio and Television Week was not held that November, the first such cancellation in the event's history, as a result of the two earthquakes that had struck the country that September.
