= Z-drag =

Method of increasing the pull on a rope

Typical Z-drag configuration used to move a given object (load).

A Z-Drag or Z-Rig is an arrangement of lines and pulleys, effectively forming a block and tackle, that is commonly used in rescue situations. The basic arrangement results in pulling the hauling end 3 times the distance the load is moved, providing a theoretical mechanical advantage of three to one. In actual practice the advantage will be reduced by friction in the pulleys or carabiners. The advantage will also be reduced if the pull on the hauling end is not parallel to the direction the load moves in. The name comes from the fact that the arrangement of lines is roughly Z-shaped. Besides the mechanical advantage to pulling, it also uses only part of the total length of the rope for the block and tackle arrangement.

The typical configuration (see diagram) uses two single pulleys and two Prusik knot loops or other suitable friction hitches. These Prusiks provide fixed attachment points on the rope that can be moved when slightly loosened. The first Prusik knot is attached to the "traveling pulley," allowing it to pull on the load. The second Prusik knot is used to hold the position of the rope and is referred to as a 'progress capture device' or ratchet. Because the tension on the line stores energy and could present a dangerous flying hazard if the rope were to break, it is also advisable to attach a towel or soft object (such as a life vest) to the end of the line near the connection to the object being pulled, to act as padding, and/or a damping device.

Borrowed from rock climbing, the Z-Drag is considered an important tool in whitewater rescue and is used primarily for the recovery of pinned boats. It is also considered a useful tool in many types of rope rescue, such as crevasse rescue, because of its simplicity, and is commonly used for lifting systems that don't require much more mechanical advantage. It also serves as a method for tightening the rope in a Tyrolean traverse, where the other end is fixed to a stable object.

== See also ==
- Trucker's hitch - another 3-fold advantage system using single loops
- Mechanical advantage
