= Swift water rescue =

Rescue techniques for white water river conditions

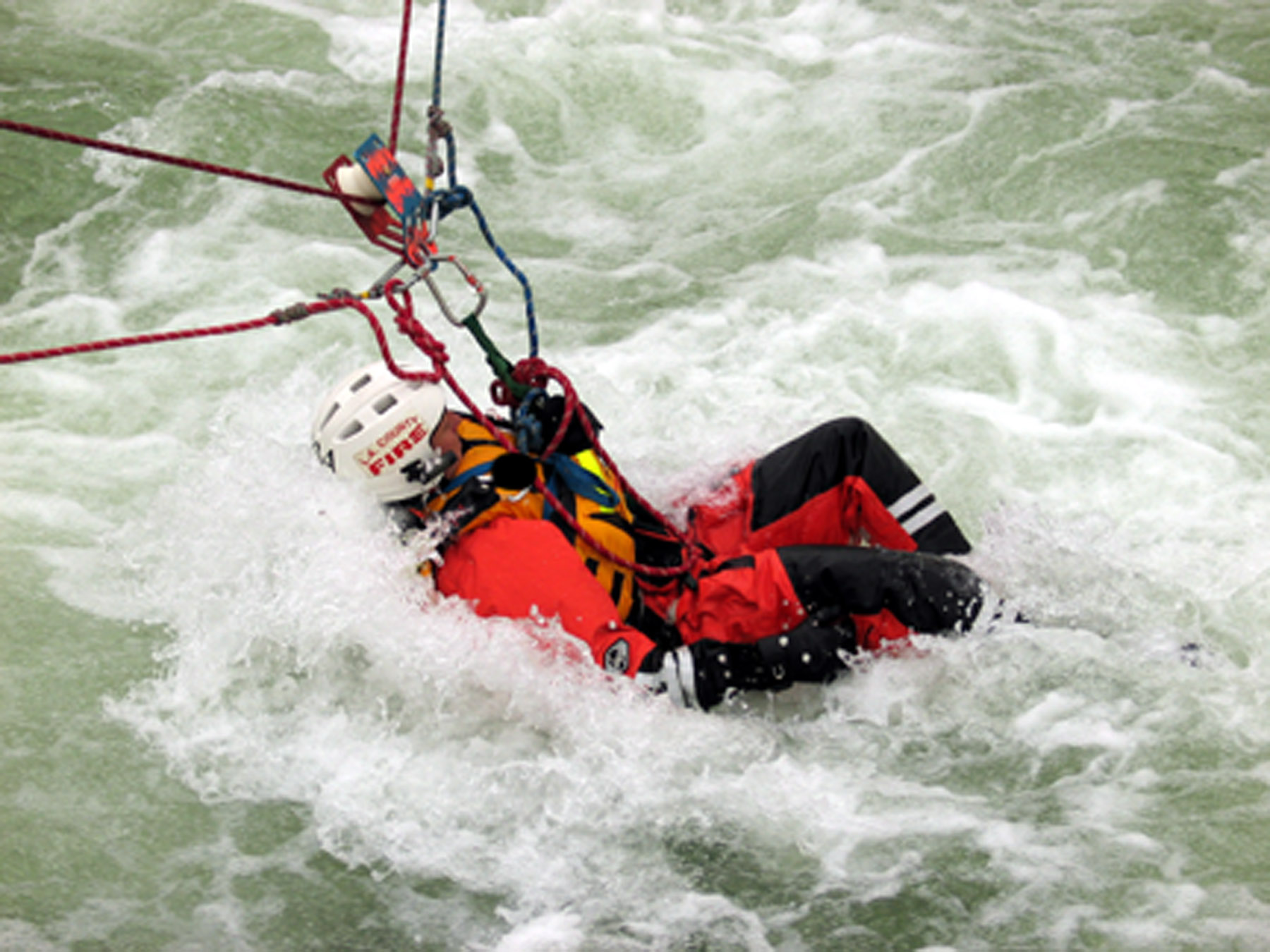
Swiftwater rescue exercise

Swift water rescue (also called "white water rescue") is a subset of technical rescue dealing in white water river conditions. Due to the added pressure of moving water, swift water rescue involves the use of specially trained personnel, ropes and mechanical advantage systems that are often much more robust than those used in standard rope rescue. The main goal is to use or deflect the water’s power to assist in the rescue of the endangered person(s), as in most situations there is no easy way to overcome the power of the water.

== Rescue operations ==
As a swift water rescue scene evolves, the Incident Command System (ICS) will emerge. ICS is a national protocol used for managing emergencies in the United States. Initially created by Jim Segerstrom and Michael Croslin co-founders of Rescue 3, Sonora California as a response to all the firefighters who were dying in water rescues], SRT has now been taught to over 200,000 rescue personnel in some 2 dozen countries. ICS has become the benchmark by which all disasters are managed in the United States. "ICS is based upon a flexible, scalable response organization providing a common framework within which people can work together effectively. These people may be drawn from multiple agencies that do not routinely work together, and ICS is designed to give standard response and operation procedures to reduce the problems and potential for miscommunication on such incidents." All rescue operations demand vigilance with regards to safety. ICS provides that a Safety Officer be present to monitor and address all safety issues. One of these issues pertains to the incident scene.

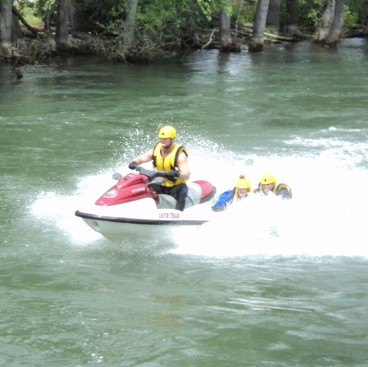
A swift water rescue drill on the Boise River, here running fast, cold and high with late spring snow melt; an unprotected human being can only retain consciousness for roughly two minutes in such cold water before succumbing to hypothermia and losing consciousness

.

=== Zones of operation ===
The immediate area of operations at the incident is divided into three zones of operation: "Cold", "Warm", and "Hot". Certain requirements regarding training and personal protective equipment (PPE) exist for personnel operating within these three zones. The Cold Zone is considered to be anything greater than 15 feet (4.6 m) from the water's edge,. Awareness Level personnel shall approach no closer than the Cold zone. The Warm Zone begins 15 feet from the water's edge, and ends at the water's edge. Personnel operating in the Warm Zone shall be trained to the Operations Level, and must wear a properly fitted and secured personal flotation device (PFD). The Hot Zone refers to any and all activities taking place in the water. These activities shall be performed by personnel trained to the Technician Level, provided they are wearing a properly fitted and secured personal flotation device.

=== Risk algorithm ===
In order to provide for the safety of both the rescuer and victim, a low to high risk algorithm has evolved for the implementation of various rescue methods in Swift Water Rescue. Under times of stress, the implementation of this algorithm helps to prevent a rescuer from endangering himself and the victim, thus providing a sound, step-by-step approach when affecting a rescue. As the algorithm progresses, the danger and threat to rescuer and victim increase. The algorithm is, "Talk", "Reach", "Wade", "Throw", "Helo", "Row", "Go", and "Tow" (this has been changed due to the increased safety of helicopter operations and the increased deaths of rescuers in boats). While it is safest to talk a victim into performing a self-rescue, there exists a substantial increase in danger once a rescuer enters the water. "Talk" refers to the dialogue that takes place between the rescuer and victim, and includes the rescuer directing the victim in methods of self-rescue, such as swimming to shore. If unsuccessful, the rescuer will attempt to "Reach" with an object, such as a tree branch, paddle, or pole, to the victim, so that the victim can be pulled to safety.

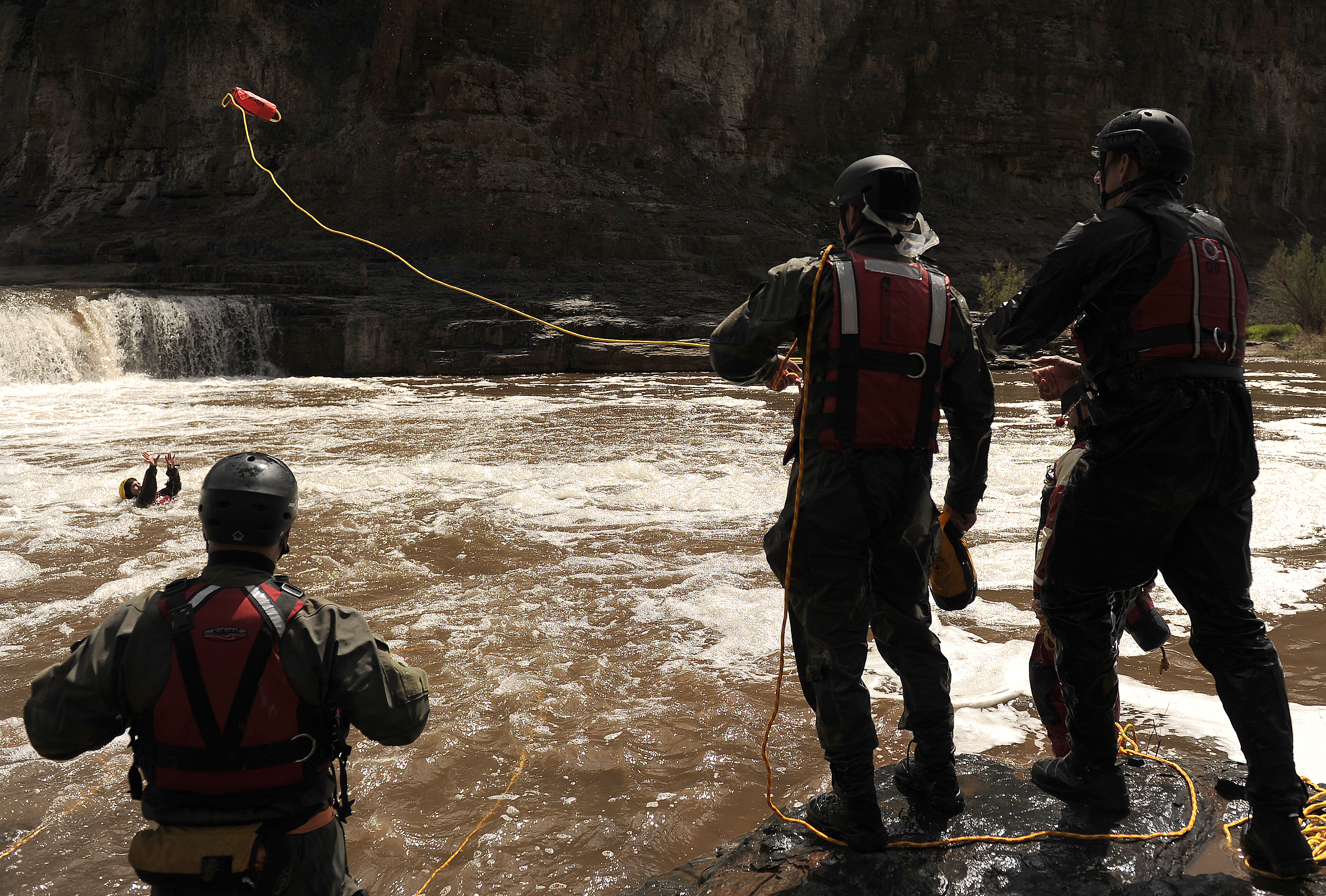
Usage of a throw bag in a swift water rescue exercise

=== Laminar flow ===
Since the laminar flow of a moving body of water carves the path of movement, it experiences friction caused by resistance along the shallows and outer or higher banks, and travels at a slower speed at the edges than the center. Therefore, a rescuer often has the opportunity to wade along the banks of a moving body of water to more easily "talk" to, or "reach" the victim. 80% of moving water rescues are effected using throw bags and other throw devices. A rescuer can "throw" a throw bag or other throw device from a boat, stable platform, or dry land, or may elect to wade into the shallows and then initiate a throw. "Row" includes, but is not limited to, all forms of boat-based operations. This includes a boat on a highline Tyrolean with a midpoint drop and two- and four-5point boat on tether systems.

=== Live bait rescue ===
In certain situations, such as an unconscious patient, one might "go and tow" the victim back to shore. Unlike other methods of rescue, the rescuer now enters the water in a swimming capacity. This method of rescue is also referred to as a "live bait rescue", where the rescuer swims to the aid of the victim while tethered to a team member at an anchor point, very much like bait on a hook at the end of a fishing pole. For example, a parent with children trapped in a vehicle in flowing water that needs to extricate and control scared or injured children on to the roof of the vehicle (there is a greater than 50% chance of dying in a vehicle that is flooded). If that platform (car, rock, bridge, roof etc.) becomes unstable or begins to succumb to rising water, that rescuer may need to tow a victim to the shore, eddy or pre-planned egress point. Towing rescues are extremely difficult and require training with a practiced rescuer as a victim. Actual tows with scared, hypothermic, exhausted, injured or panicked victims are extremely difficult and dangerous for both parties and should be left to rescuers well versed in proper rescuer/victim communication, holds, and swimming techniques. When a victim is not accessible from any of the previous rescue methods, resources permitting, a helicopter rescue may be attempted. A helicopter, or "helo", is a stable rescue platform from which a variety of rescue methods can be initiated. While the helicopter must be equipped for rescue work, the crew must be equipped, trained and well practiced in the art of swift water rescue

== NFPA standards ==
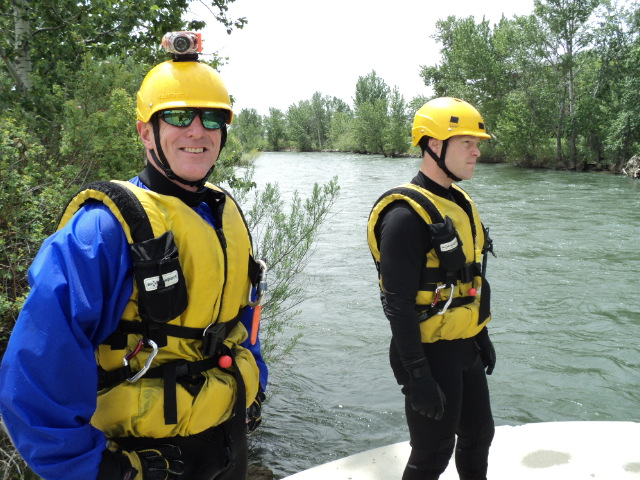
Some swift water rescue equipment —note the helmet-mounted video camera.

In the US and Canada, surface water and swift water rescue is covered under National Fire Protection Association (NFPA) 1006 Standard for Technical Rescuer Professional Qualifications, 2008 Edition. This standard contains two separate chapters that define the required knowledge, skills and abilities for surface water rescue (Chapter 11) and swift water rescue (Chapter 12). The use of the terms Awareness, Operational and Technician have been replaced by two levels of qualification: Level I and Level II.

According to page 12 of NFPA 1006:

- 3.3.215.1 Level I Technical Rescuer: This level applies to individuals who identify hazards, use equipment, and apply limited techniques specified in this standard to perform technical rescue operations.
- 3.3.215.2 Level II Technical Rescuer: This level applies to individuals who identify hazards, use equipment, and apply advanced techniques specified in this standard to perform technical rescue operations.

=== Specialized ratings ===
Additionally there are more specialised ratings such as:

- White water Rescue Technician for the River Professional: For swift water/white water professionals, for whom rescue scenarios may be encountered on a daily basis;
- Dive Rescue - NFPA 1006, Chapter 13: Provides Level I and Level II standards for technical rescuers working underwater;
- Ice Rescue - NFPA 1006, Chapter 14: Provides Level I and Level II standards for technical rescuers working water incidents also involving ice;
- Surf Rescue - NFPA 1006, Chapter 15: Provides Level I and Level II standards for technical rescuers working in tidal or ocean water'
- Motorized Boat Operations: Teaches specialized boat handling and operation for rescue personnel and includes flood hazards and swift water maneuvering.

== See also ==
- Z-drag

== Bibliography ==
- Bechdel, Les; Ray, Slim (1989). River Rescue. Boston: Appalachian Mountain Club Books. ISBN 0-910146-76-4.
- Howard, Eric; Monson, John (2002). Down time : an oral history of the Lee's Summit Underwater Rescue & Recovery team. [Lee's Summit, Mo.]: The author. ISBN 1-58909-095-0.
