= Climbing technique =

Skills used in climbing

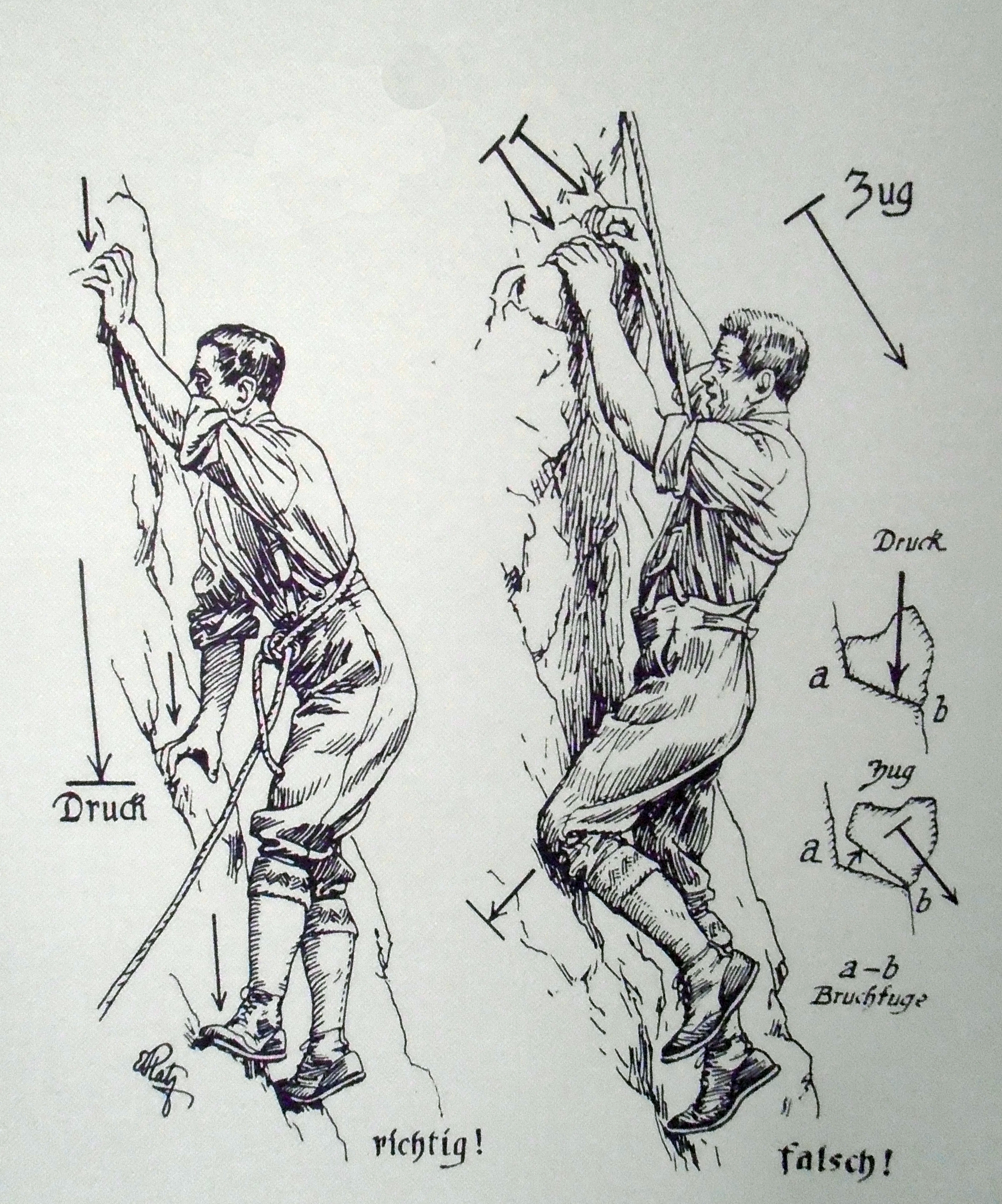
Illustration from a 1924 textbook by Ernst Platz

Climbing technique refers to a broad range of physical movements used in the activity or sport of climbing.

Notable sub-groups of climbing technique include:

- Aid climbing technique as is used in aid climbing
- Big wall climbing technique as is used in big wall climbing
- Ice climbing technique as is used in ice climbing
- Mixed climbing technique as is used in mixed climbing and in dry-tooling
- Mountaineering technique as is used in mountaineering and in alpine climbing
- Multi-pitch climbing technique as is used in multi-pitch rock, ice, and mixed climbing
- Rock-climbing technique as is used in bouldering, competition climbing, free solo climbing (including deep-water soloing), sport climbing, traditional climbing and in top rope climbing.
- Rescue techniques in climbing including:
  - Crevasse-rescue technique as is used in glacier travel and in alpine climbing
  - Self-rescue technique as is used in self-rescue climbing
- Rope-solo technique as is used in rope solo climbing
- Simul climbing technique as used in simul-climbing and by rope teams

== See also ==
- Beta (climbing), information on what technique to use
- Campus board, an important training device for enabling advanced climbing techniques
- Grade (climbing), closely associated with the development of climbing technique
- History of rock climbing, a chronicle of the impact of evolving techniques on standards
