= Self rescue (climbing) =

Technique used in climbing

Skills used in self-rescue by climbers

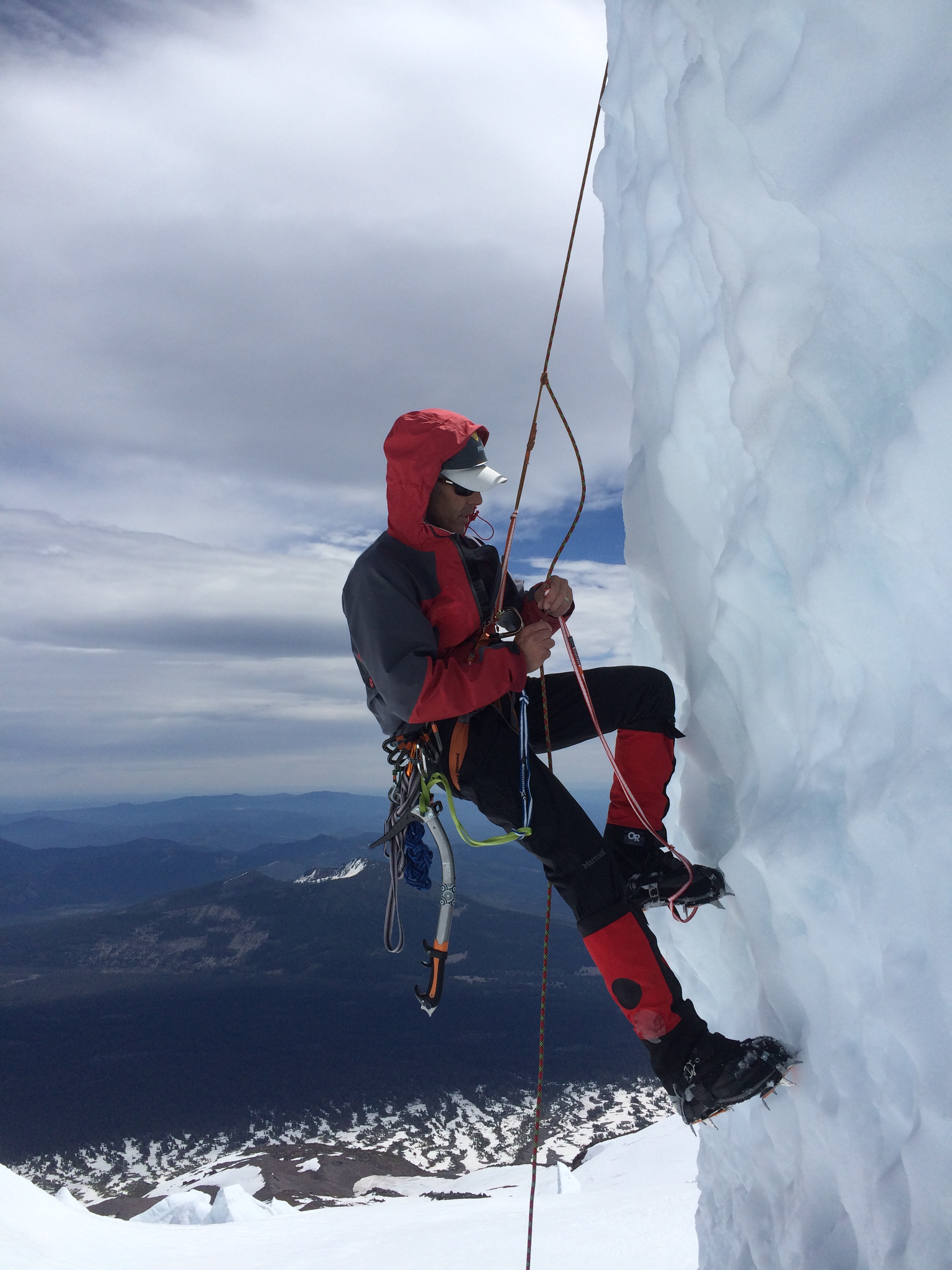
Ascending back up a fixed rope with prusik knots

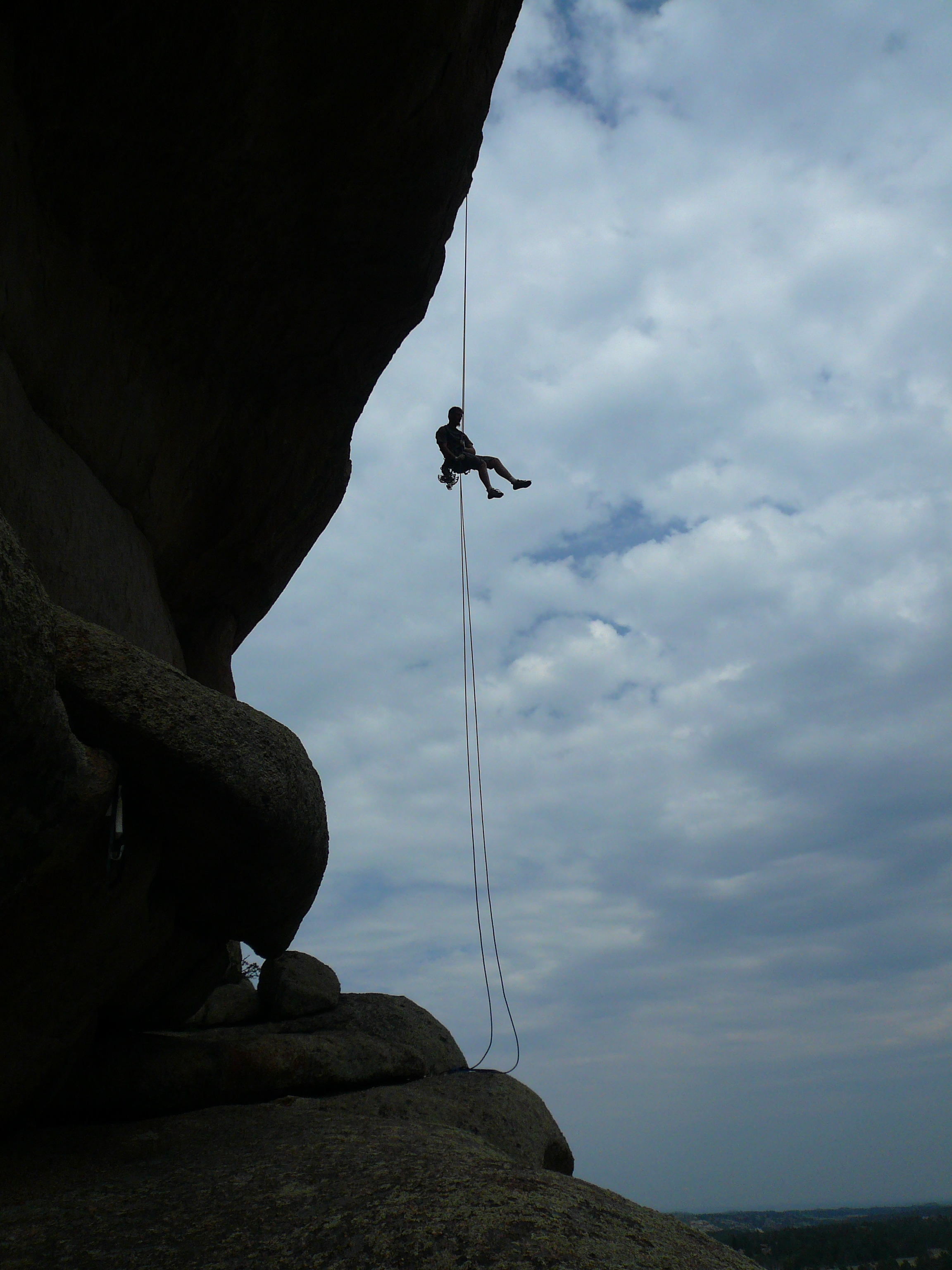
Forced abseils into usual places off the route

Self-rescue (or self-extraction) is a group of techniques in climbing and mountaineering where the climber(s) – sometimes having just been severely injured – use their equipment to retreat from dangerous or difficult situations on a given climbing route without calling on third-party search and rescue (SAR) or mountain rescue services for help.

The reasons for a retreat can include an injured or fatigued climber(s) who can no longer continue the climb, the climber(s) having lost their way on the climbing route, a sudden severe storm/bad weather, lost/damaged climbing equipment—or food/water provisions— due to an avalanche or a dropped haul bag, or the route grade is too difficult.

Self-rescue techniques speed up the time taken to get injured climber(s) to safety, and it can also save the climber(s) from being charged for SAR services (e.g. full helicopter rescue is expensive), and avoids putting the SAR team members into harm's way and diverting SAR resources from being able to support other emergencies. In remote locations, there may be no readily available SAR services (e.g. Himalayan climbing on remote peaks), and self-rescue is the only option for the climber(s) to be rescued within a reasonable period that will make treatment viable.

Not all climbers are familiar with or skilled in self-rescue techniques. Self-rescue can involve unfamiliar actions with improvised knots instead of the correct equipment. For example: safely transferring loaded tension from a climbing rope to another anchor point; completing extended or weight-laden abseils without the correct abseiling device; ascending back up a fixed rope without an ascender device; or extracting a fallen climber from a crevasse without a pulley system. The difficulty may be increased by circumstances like broken limb(s) or a storm. Self-rescue can be particularly complicated on multi-pitch, big-wall, and alpine routes, where climbers hang from ropes on exposed vertical rock faces, often in bad weather.

== See also ==
- Self-arrest
- Glossary of climbing terms
- Mountain rescue
  - Crevasse rescue
