= Controlled Impact Rescue Tool =

Concrete breaching tool

Controlled Impact Rescue Tool, or CIRT, is a concrete breaching tool produced by Raytheon, that is capable of providing Urban Search & Rescue (USAR) teams with the ability to penetrate a reinforced concrete wall up to four times faster than traditional methods.

In development since 2007, this 38-inch long, 105-pound tool uses blank ammunition cartridges to drive a piston that generates a high-energy jolt to create a contained hole in the concrete. A series of these holes allows the creation of an area large enough to deliver vital supplies such as food, water and medicine to victims before first responders are able to get victims to safety.

The force generated by CIRT is concentrated in a localized area, minimizing threats to the safety of survivors and the potential destabilization of the surrounding structure. A self-contained tool, CIRT does not require the drilling, chipping, or sawing used by traditional methods to reach survivors trapped under collapsed concrete. It does not require hoses, extension cords, or other auxiliary power equipment for operations.
