= Imperial-Royal Mountain Troops =

Austrian military unit

The Imperial-Royal Mountain Troops (German: Kaiserlich-königliche Gebirgstruppe) were founded in 1906 as part of the Austrian Landwehr, the territorial army of the Cisleithanian half of the Austro-Hungarian Empire. As a result, the abbreviation "k.k." (for kaiserlich österreichisch, königlich böhmisch or "Imperial Austrian, Royal Bohemian") was used and not "k.u.k." ("Imperial and Royal") which would have implied a connexion with the Hungarian half of the Empire.

Proposed in a memorandum by Conrad von Hötzendorf, in February 1906 the War Ministry in Vienna convened a session on Alpine border security. Field Marshal Tunk, agreed with him and put forward a concept, the fundamentals of which were then carried out.

The existing state rifle regiments were to be trained as mountain troops and, together with the Landsturm border patrol companies and gendarmerie departments were to form the backbone of a territorial defence force with local knowledge on the border of Tyrol.

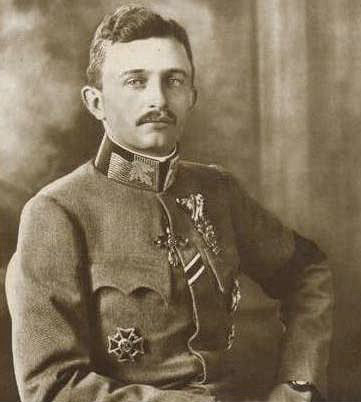
The Commander-in-Chief from 1916, Emperor Charles I

== Formation and deployment on 1 Aug 1914 ==
On 1 May 1906 the two state rifle regiments with their HQs stationed in Bozen and Trient (now Bolzano and Trento, both in Italy) and the 4th Landwehr Infantry (Klagenfurt) were nominated as "high mountain troops" (Hochgebirgstruppe) and, in 1909, a third state rifle regiment, with its HQ stationed in Candido, was added. In 1911, the fifth regiment followed: the 27th Imperial-Royal Landwehr Infantry (Laibach).

The area of the Carnic ridge in Carinthia and the Julian Alps was assigned to the 4th Landwehr Infantry (Klagenfurt) and the 27th Landwehr Infantry (Ljubljana). These two, hitherto standard infantry regiments were given the new uniform of the mountain troops. From 11 April 1917 they bore the names 1st and 2nd Mountain Rifles.

1st Imperial-Royal State Rifles (Trient) (k.k. Landesschützenregiment "Trient" Nr. I)

- Commanding Officer: Colonel Adolf Sloninka von Holodów
- HQ / I Battalion in Trient
- II Battalion in Strigno
- III Battalion in Ala
- IV Battalion in Rovereto

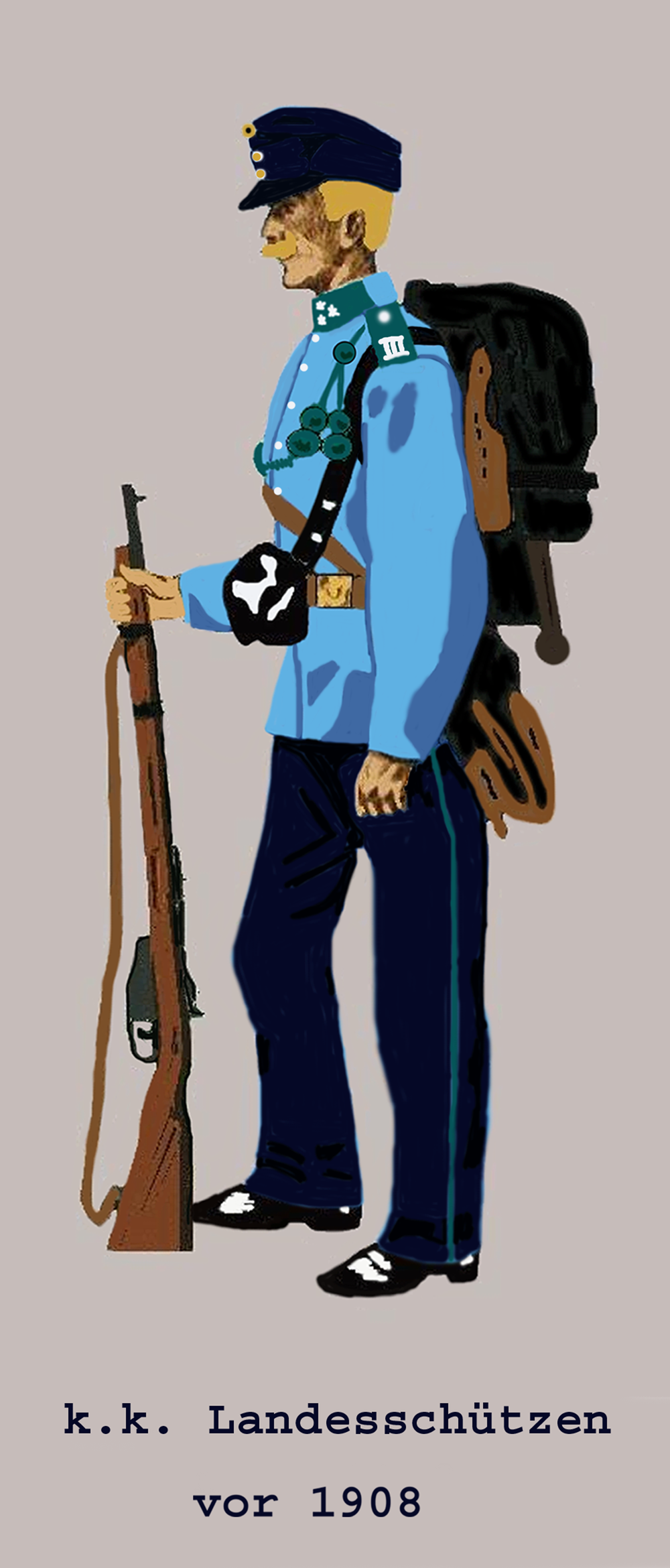
Mountain infantryman in marching order 1906-1908

2nd Imperial-Royal State Rifles (Bozen) (k.k. Landesschützenregiment "Bozen" Nr. II)

- Commanding Officer: Colonel Karl Josef Stiller
- HQ / II Battalion in Bozen
- I Battalion in Meran
- III Battalion in Riva del Garda

3rd Imperial-Royal State Rifles (Innichen) (k.k. Landesschützenregiment "Innichen" Nr. III)

- Commanding Officer: Colonel Hugo Schönherr / Colonel Josef Hadaszczok
- HQ in Innichen
- I Battalion in Primör
- II Battalion in Predazzo
- III Battalion in Ampezzo

Mounted Tyrolean State Rifle Division

- Commanding Officer: Lieut. Colonel Moritz Srnka
- Trient
- 4th Landwehr Infantry (Klagenfurt) (Landwehr Infanterie Regiment "Klagenfurt" Nr. 4)

44th Infantry Brigade - 22nd Infantry Division - III Army Corps
Commanding Officer: Colonel Friedrich Eckhardt von Eckhardtsburg
Established: 1889
HQ / III Baon in Klagenfurt
I / II Baon in Hermagor
Nationalities: 79% German - 21% Other
Recruiting district: Klagenfurt

- 27th Landwehr Infantry (Laibach) (Landwehr Infanterie Regiment "Laibach" Nr. 27)

44th Infantry Brigade - 22nd Infantry Division - III Army Corps
Commanding Officer: Colonel Karl Zahradniczek
Established: 1901
HQ / I and III Baon in Laibach
II Baon in Görz
Nationalities: 86% Slovene - 14% Other
Recruiting district: Laibach

The regiments began with high alpine training and moved into so-called summer stations in mountain inns, Alpine Club huts and tented camps, where they carried out intense training. The winter stations were naturally located in the valleys, but this did prevent there being a comprehensive programme of winter exercises, alpine skiing course and skiing training in the mountains.

== Dress and equipment ==
In 1907, the gamecock spray of white and black feathers that had been worn on the cap until 1887 by the state rifles was re-introduced. Together with the edelweiss on the collar, it formed the badge of the Imperial-Royal Mountain Troops. Otherwise the uniform was the same as that of the Jäger infantry. What was new was the pike gray mountain dress: mountain boots, mountain socks, britches, heavy jacket, cap, coat, cape. Officers continued to wear their previous Landwehr uniform as individual (i.e. not in squads) on parade.

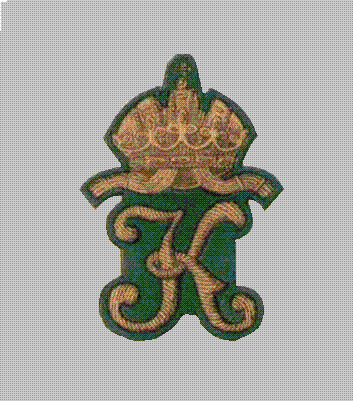
Officers' cap badge after 1916

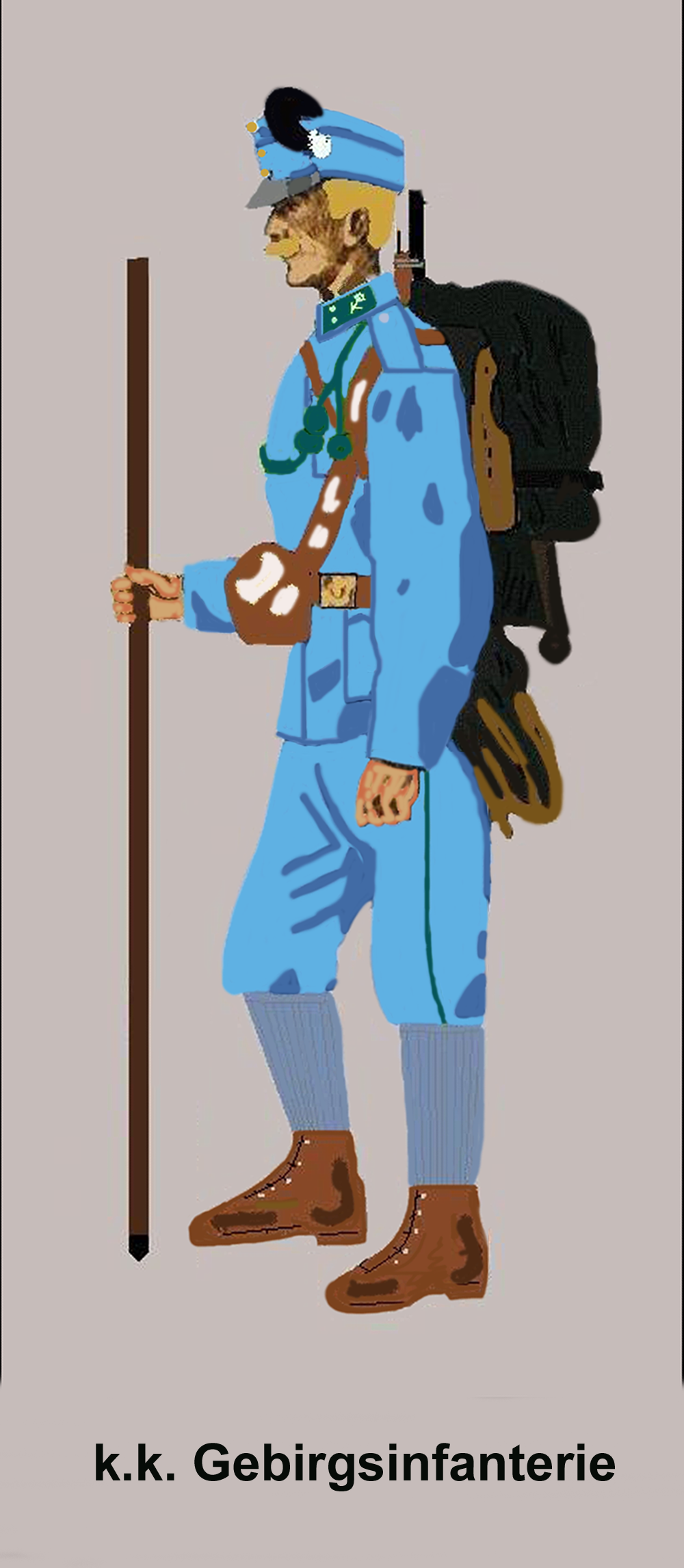
State rifleman in mountain dress after 1908

Battalions and companies were given pack animals. The rifle was replaced by the (shorter) 8mm Mannlicher M 95 carbine. They were issued with additional equipment adapted to the requirements of mountain warfare; including skis, ropes, crampons and ice axes. Regiments were reinforced by a mountain machine gun section of four machine guns which, to improve mobility, could be carried by pack animals or in manportable packs at the highest altitudes. The same applied to the take-apart mountain guns. Portable field stoves (Schwarmöfen) and heated tents assisted troops to operate in inhospitable conditions.

When skiing the two-stick approach had replaced the single-stick method. The Bilgeri binding was a touring binding that could be used with the normal hiking boot.

- Extract from the pamphlet "Mountain Warfare in Winter" (Gebirgskrieg im Winter)

Produced by the k.u.k. State Defence Command in Tyrol o.J.

Alpine equipment as follows:

A. General mountain equipment which is allocated to every soldier in combat units; it comprises:

1 rucksack with 2 breast pockets
1 climbing stick
1 pair of snow shoes (Schneereifen)
1 pair of snow glasses
1 pair of four-toothed crampons

B. Equipment of the high Alpine sections: the above equipment and, in addition:

1 pair of ten-toothed crampons with straps
1 complete set of skis (Skizeug)
1 pair of avalanche cords (Lawinenschnüre)
1 pair of shoe covers (Schuhüberzüge)
1 pair of mitten covers
1 windbreaker
1 pair of windproof trousers
1 snow suit (in emergencies also a parka)

for every four men:

1 ice pick with pick sling
1 tin of glacier ointment
1 spirit stove and container

A complete set of skis comprises:

1 pair of skis and bindings
1 pair of double sticks
1 pair of carrying straps-Fellersatz
1 pair of Harschteisen
Ski wax

A pair of skis and bindings consists of:

1 pair of ski planks
1 pair of bindings with spanners and affixing screws
1 pair of sole plates
1 set of ski straps

== Badges of rank ==
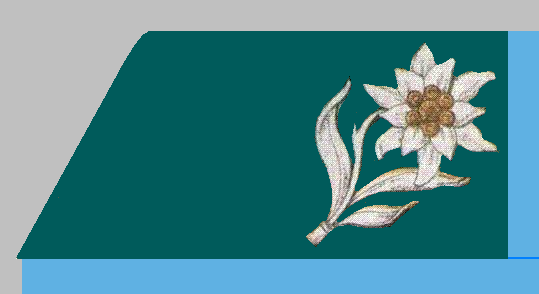
Jaeger (Jäger)

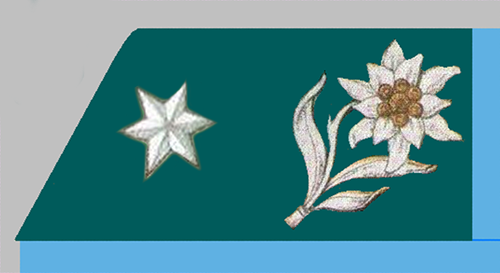
Lance Corporal (Patrouillenführer)

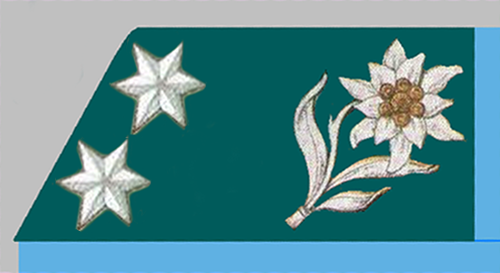
Corporal (Unterjäger)

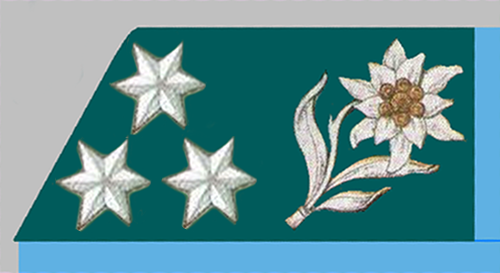
Master Corporal or Lance Sergeant (Zugsführer)

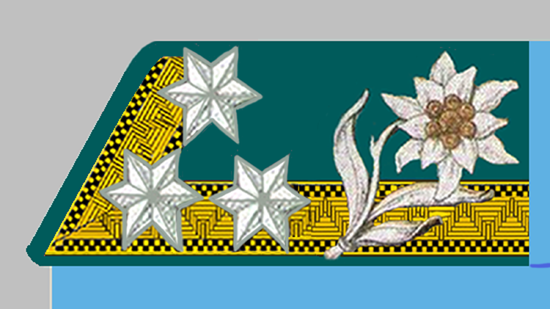
Sergeant (Oberjäger)

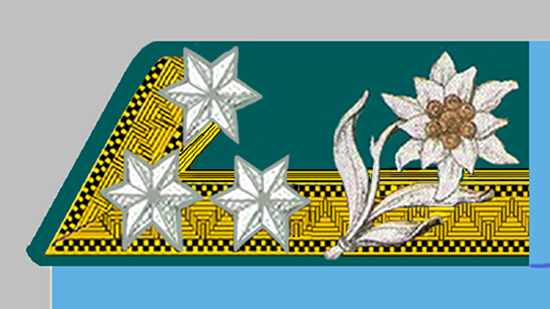
Cadet Sergeant (Kadett-Feldwebel)
Cadet (Kadett) from 1908

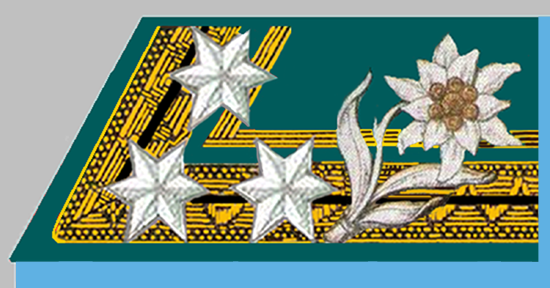
Staff Sergeant (Stabsoberjäger) until 1914

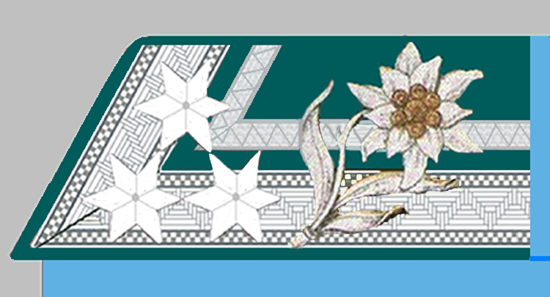
Staff Sergeant (Stabsoberjäger) after 1914

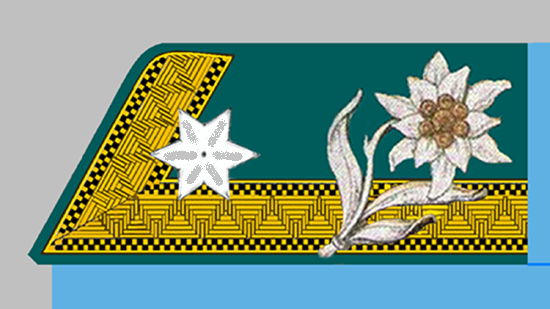
Cadet Warrant Officer (Kadettoffiziersstellvertreter) to 1908

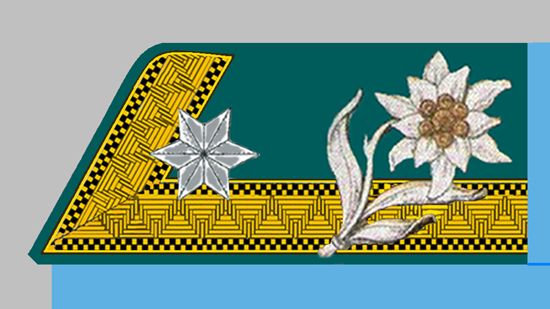
Ensign or Officer Cadet (Fähnrich) from 1908

Warrant Officer (Offiziersstellvertreter) from 1915

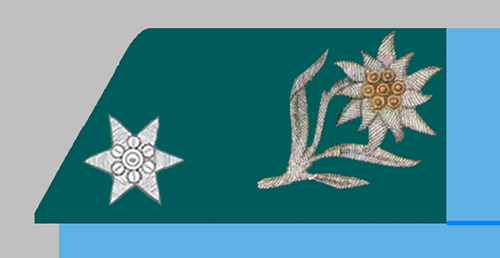
2nd Lieutenant (Leutnant)

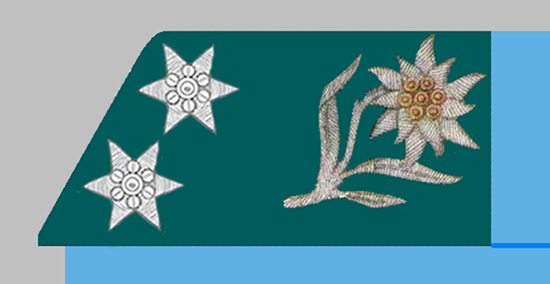
Lieutenant (Oberleutnant)

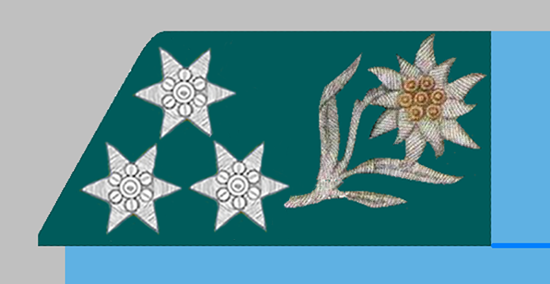
Captain (Hauptmann)

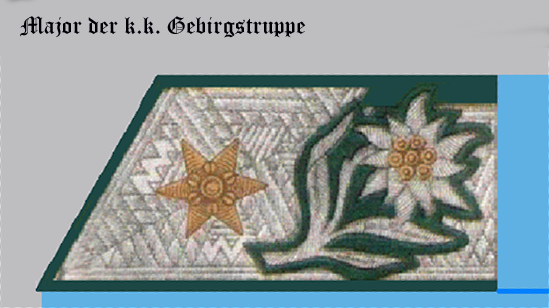
Major (Major)

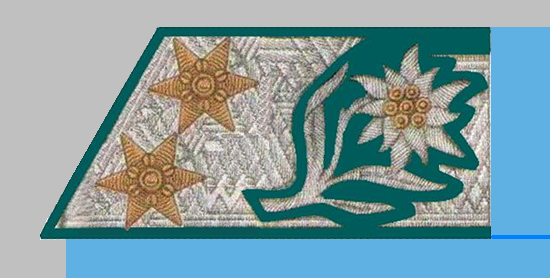
Lieutenant Colonel (Oberstleutnant)

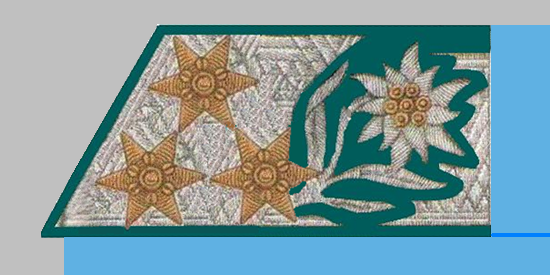
Colonel (Oberst)

The rank stars and the edelweiss badge of the officers were made of metal thread. The stars of the other ranks were made of celluloid, the edelweiss of metal. From 1914, cadets and Staffsoberjäger wore stars of white silk.

== See also ==
- State Rifles (Landesschützen)
- Gebirgsjäger
- Common Army (k.u.k. Armee)
- Imperial-Royal Landwehr
- Royal Hungarian Landwehr
- Austro-Hungarian Army
- The Imperial-Royal Landwehr's mountain troops on the website of the Austrian Bundesheer

== Sources ==
- Austrian State Archives/War Archives (Österreichisches Staatsarchiv/Kriegsarchiv), Vienna.
- Heinz von Lichem: Spielhahnstoß and Edelweiß, Leopold Stocker Verlag, Graz, 1977.
- Heinz von Lichem: Der Tiroler Hochgebirgskrieg 1915 - 1918. Steiger Verlag, Berwang (Tirol), 1985.
- Graf Bossi Fedregotti: Kaiserjäger. Stocker Verlag, Graz 1977.
- Carl von Bardolff: Soldat im alten Österreich. Diederichs Verlag, Jena 1938.
- Stefan Rest, Christian Ortner, Thomas Ilming: Des Kaisers Rock im 1. Weltkrieg. Verlag Militaria, Vienna, 2002, ISBN 3950164200.
- Michael Wachtler and Günther Obwegs: Krieg in den Bergen - Dolomiten. Athesia Bozen, 2003.
- von Lempruch: Ortlerkämpfe 1915 - 1918. Buchdienst Südtirol, 2005.
- Herman Hinterstoisser, M.Christian Ortner, Erwin A. Schmidl Die k.k. Landwehr-Gebirgstruppen. Vienna, 2006, ISBN 3-902526-02-5.

== Literature ==
- Hubert Fankhauser: Freiwillige an Kärntens Grenzen. Die Regimentsgeschichte der K. K. Kärntner freiwilligen Schützen 1915 bis 1918th Vehling Verlag. ISBN 978-3-85333-150-7
