= Crevasse rescue =

Technique in mountaineering

Aspects of crevasse rescue

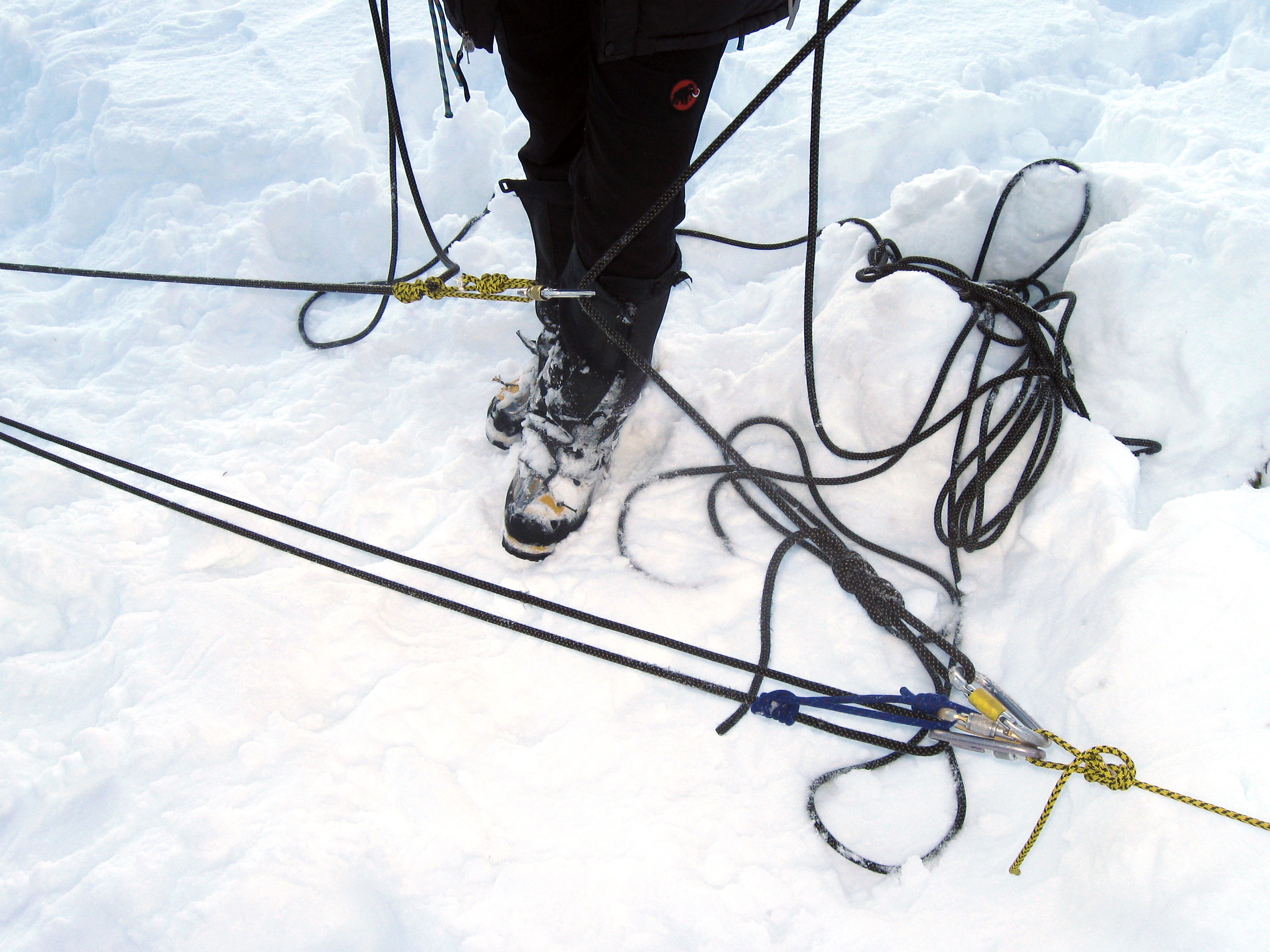
Z-pulley system

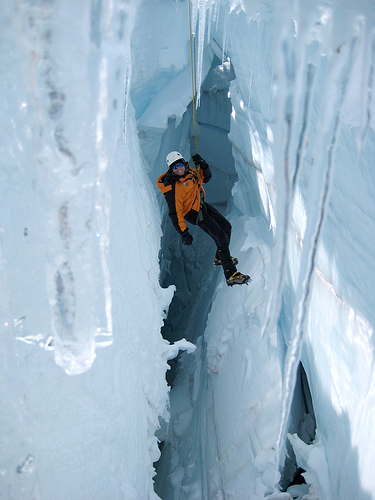
Climber hauling

Crevasse rescue (or crevasse-extraction) is a set of techniques in mountaineering where climbers use their equipment to pull a climber, who has just fallen into a crevasse, to safety. Crevasse rescue is considered a core skill set in alpine climbing, but difficult to do efficiently. It is typically encountered by rope teams on glaciers.

When a climber falls into a crevasse, ideally the other rope team member(s) react quickly and self-arrest using their ice axes so they are not also dragged into the crevasse. After arresting, their first major task is to transfer some or all of the weight of the fallen climber—who is hanging in the crevasse—to a snow anchor (or other fixed anchor such as a deadman anchor or a snow bollard), which they do by using prussik knots or progress capture devices (PCDs) to transfer the rope from them onto the new fixed anchor.

Having transferred some or all of the weight of the fallen climber, the other team member(s) will assess the situation and try to communicate with the fallen climber. Even if the fallen climber is largely unharmed with no broken limbs, the narrow walls of the crevasse are very cold and hypothermia can develop quickly. They will also assess the level of force that the lip of the crevasse can withstand for any hauling, and they may reinforce the lip with clothing or spare equipment (e.g. an ice axe or ski poles) if needed. If the rope team had been using friction knots in the rope to help absorb any crevasse fall — they grab the lip — they must now decide how to get around these knots when hauling upwards (e.g. use a separate rope).

If the fallen climber can move and has prussik knots and/or ascenders, then they can jumar up the now fixed rope and effectively perform a self-rescue to the surface. Where the fallen climber is unable to do this due to injury, being constrained by the crevasse walls, or lack of skill and equipment, then the other climber(s) will have to haul the fallen climber up from the crevasse. For smaller teams, the other climber(s) may try to set up a pulley system using prussik knots, snow anchors, and climbing pulleys, to reduce the hauling effort, and ideally, a Z-pulley system that will give them a 3:1 mechanical advantage, however, there are many variations depending on the specific equipment and skill-level of the members. In very developed areas, such as the Mont Blanc Massif, rescue helicopters have mechanical winches to directly haul climbers — or skiers — from deep crevasses.

== See also ==
- Climbing technique
- Glossary of climbing terms
- Mountain rescue
- Self rescue (climbing)
