= North face of the Eiger =

Mountain face in the Swiss Alps

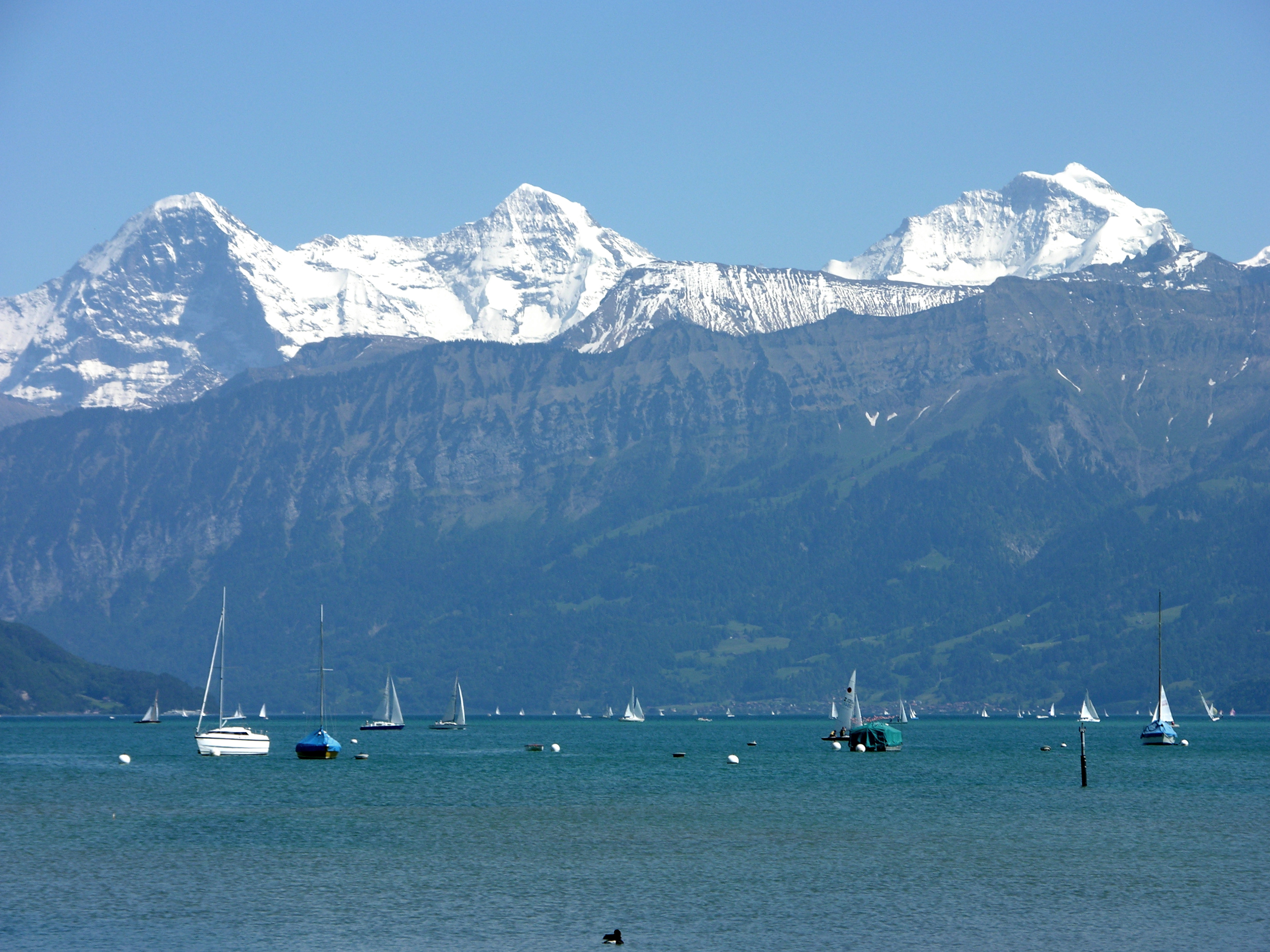
Lake Thun with Eiger (left), Mönch and Jungfrau

The Eiger (3,967 m (13,015 ft)) is part of the Bernese Alps in Switzerland, and its north face (one of the great north faces of the Alps) rises over 1,800 meters (5,900 ft). With alpine climbing routes that are up to four kilometers long, the face hosts some of the Alps' longest and most demanding climbing routes, with significant risks from rockfall and avalanches. The wall gained fame through dramatic climbing attempts and ascents, heightened by its visibility from Grindelwald and, even more clearly, from the Wengernalp Railway-accessible Kleine Scheidegg.

In a 1935 climbing attempt, Max Sedlmayr and Karl Mehringer perished. In the 1936 attempt, all four climbers from two Austrian and German teams died: the first team consisted of Germans Toni Kurz and Andreas Hinterstoisser, and the second included Willy Angerer and Edi Rainer. In 1938, a four-man team of Anderl Heckmair, Heinrich Harrer, Ludwig Vörg, and Fritz Kasparek achieved the first ascent. Early ascents during the Nazi era faced criticism due to their political associations and the then-novel climbing style, which was not yet established in the Western Alps.

Today, over 30 interconnected routes traverse the face, some requiring mastery of the highly challenging UIAA X grade of difficulty. Leading alpinists can climb the face in a few hours under favorable weather conditions. Since November 2015, the speed record for the Heckmair Route has been held by Swiss extreme alpinist Ueli Steck at 2 hours, 22 minutes, and 50 second, where as the first ascent in 1938 took over three days.

== Location and surroundings ==
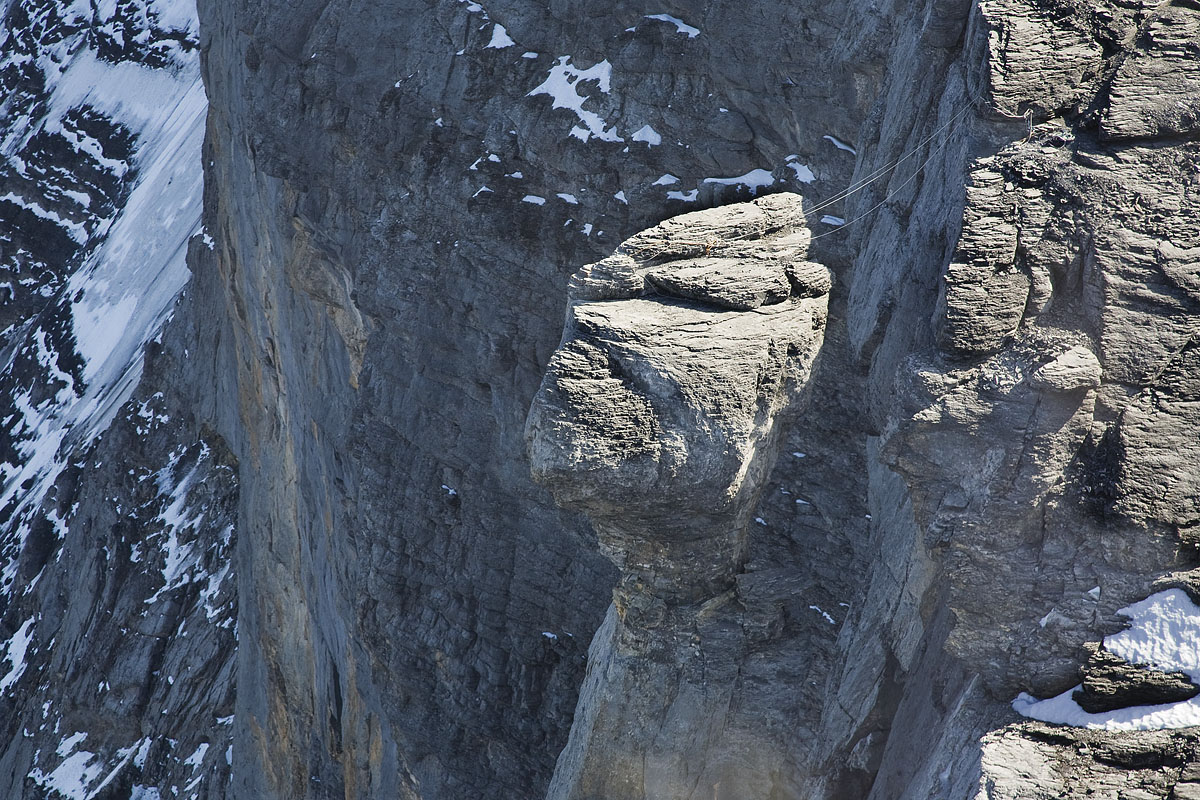
Stratification in the North Face. From this "Mushroom," Ueli Gegenschatz performed a BASE jump in 2000.

The Eiger rises southwest of Grindelwald in the Interlaken-Oberhasli District of the Canton of Bern. It is part of the Swiss Alps and the Bernese Alps. The famous north side comprises the Northeast Face and the North Face, which is technically a northwest face, separated by the North Pillar. The Mittellegi Ridge bounds the Northeast Face to the east, while the North Face ends at the West Ridge. At the base of the north side lies the boundary of the UNESCO World Natural Heritage Jungfrau-Aletsch Protected Area. Within the rock behind the North Face runs part of the Jungfrau Railway's Great Tunnel to the Jungfraujoch. The face includes the viewing gallery of the Eigerwand Station. Like the entire Eiger, the face is composed of limestone from the Helvetic System. The sediments form alternating layers of Schrattenkalk, marl, and shale, dipping 60 to 70 degrees northward. This stratification is visible on the face's exterior.

== History ascents ==
The Eiger-Nordwand has been climbed by many renowned alpinists, including Gaston Rébuffat, Hermann Buhl, Kurt Diemberger, and Reinhold Messner. It earned the nickname Mordwand ("Murder Wall") in the mid-1930s after two fatal climbing attempts. Over 70 climbers have died on or around the face, with many others requiring extensive rescue efforts. Two climbers remain missing, and for one, it is uncertain if he even entered the face, as only his tent was found at its base.

=== Background ===
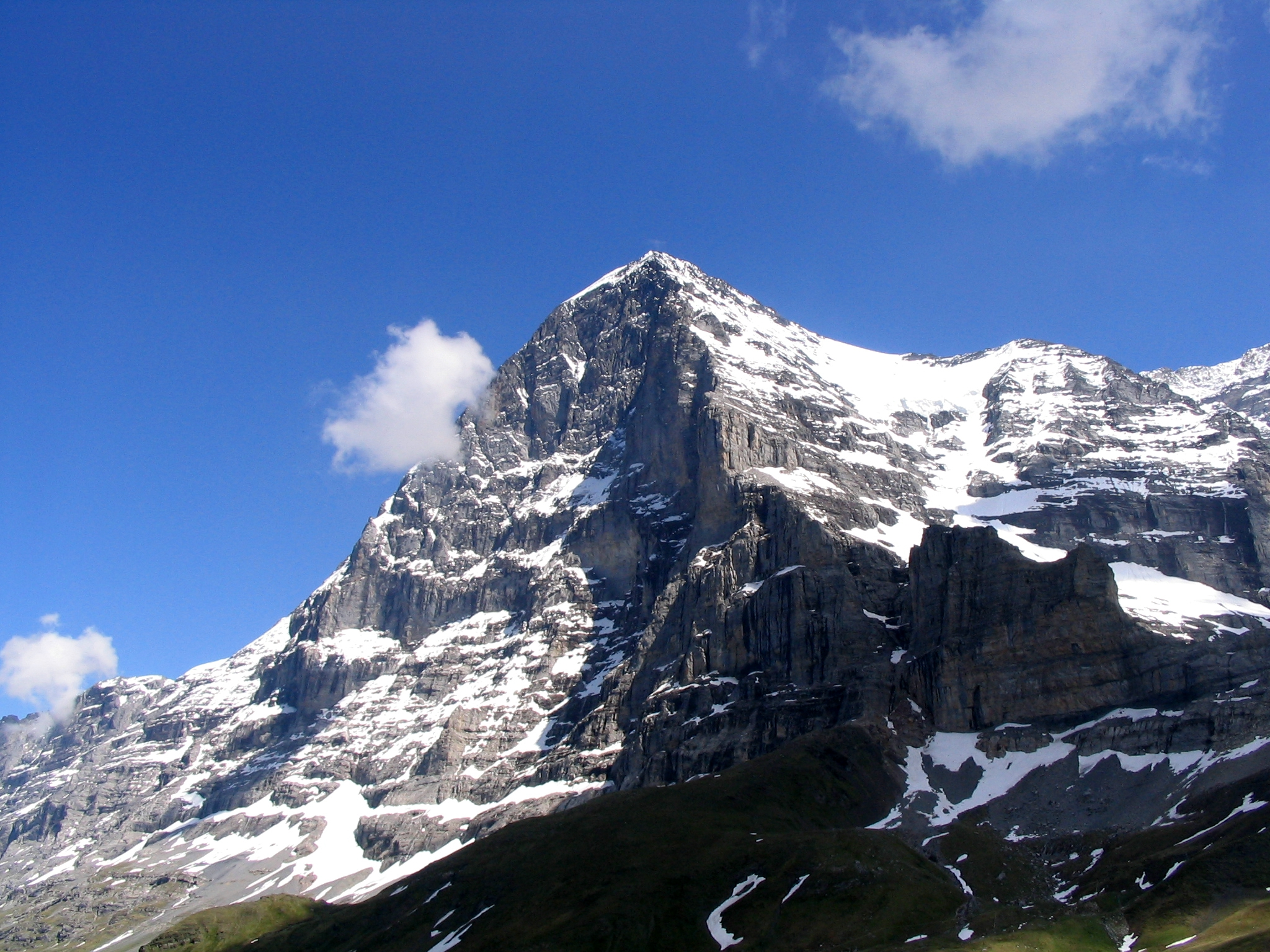
The Eiger-Nordwand viewed from the northwest.

A British climber, A. W. Moore, wrote in his 1864 book about the Eiger-Nordwand:

Of the thousands who pass yearly beneath the shadow of this grand wall, which in height and steepness surpasses that of the Wetterhorn, all are deeply impressed by its wild precipice. But overwhelming as the sight of these rockfalls may be from below, no one can truly gauge them without looking down from above. Not even in the Dauphiné have I seen such a sheer, smooth drop. A stone breaking from the ridge crest falls hundreds of meters without striking anything. It is almost astonishing that the west side of this massive rock mountain is relatively easy to climb, while the north face plunges so steeply, as if the entire mountain were cut away. Smooth and utterly unclimbable...

— A. W. Moore, The Alps

Among alpinists, the term "Nordwand" is often associated with exceptional difficulties and dangers. In the Alps, steep faces with northern exposure tend to have more significant glaciation. The lack of sunlight delays the melting of ice after a weather front. On faces like the Eiger-Nordwand, fresh snow triggers avalanches even with relatively small accumulations due to the steepness. The face was considered one of the Alps' "last problems," especially after successful ascents of other north faces like the Matterhorn and Grandes Jorasses. Its concave structure can amplify storms, with temperatures dropping to −40 °C, even in clear weather. During a typical northwest cold front, the Eiger's north side is the first major obstacle, intensifying weather effects.

Advancements in climbing equipment significantly contributed to the feasibility of climbing the Eiger-Nordwand. Crampons with up to ten points were used since the mid-19th century, but twelve-point models, available from 1938, enabled climbs on steep ice, eliminating the need for energy-intensive step-cutting. However, these were expensive at the time. Since 1911, climbing ropes, pitons, and carabiners enabled safety standards through fixed points, making difficult faces climbable. Despite these improvements, climbing remained dangerous; ropes tied around the body without a climbing harness often caused severe internal injuries during falls.

=== Attempts and first ascent ===
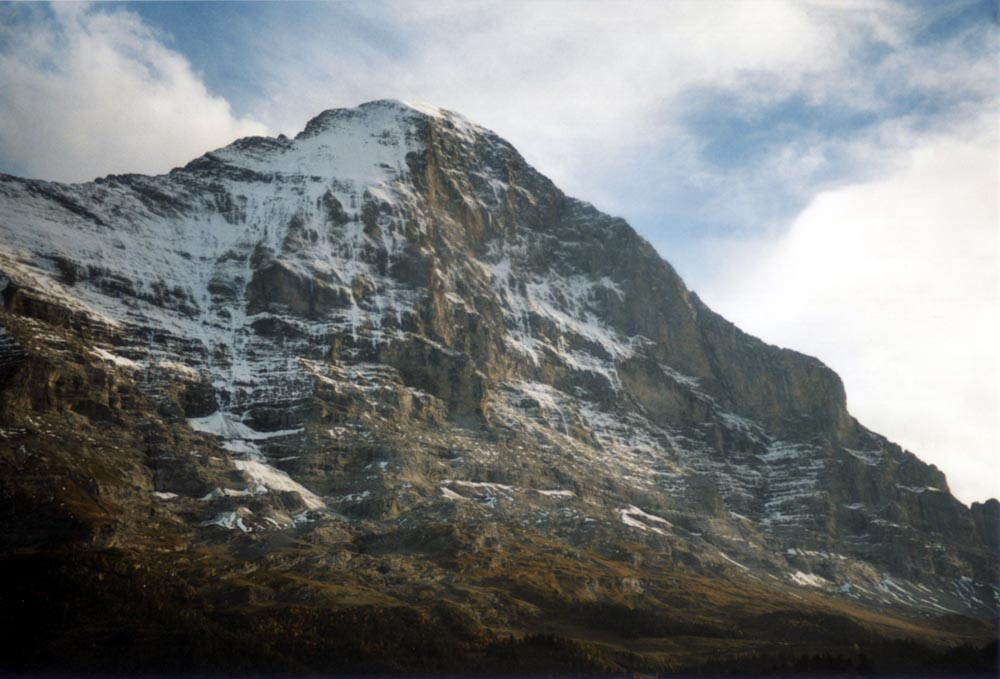
Northeast and Eiger-Nordwand, separated by the North Pillar

The earliest recorded ambition to climb the face is attributed to Ramsau guide Johann Grill. In 1883, while heading to a Jungfrau traverse with John P. Farrar, he was so captivated by the face that he was barely dissuaded from attempting it. The first recorded climb in the face occurred in 1911, when Grindelwald guide Christen Almer and Zermatt guide Joseph Schaler, with Englishman P. H. Thorp, climbed from Kleine Scheidegg to below the Eigerwand Station, where they were pulled up by a rope.

On August 20, 1932, Swiss climbers Hans Lauper and Alfred Zürcher, with guides Josef Knubel from St. Niklaus and Alexander Graven from Zermatt, made the first ascent of the Northeast Face in one day without artificial aids. Heinrich Harrer described this as the last great classical-style first ascent by Switzerland's finest guides. This route, now called the Lauper Route, crosses 55-degree ice fields with climbing difficulties up to V.

The first serious attempt on the Eiger-Nordwand by Munich climbers Max Sedlmayr and Karl Mehringer in August 1935 ended tragically. Choosing a direct route, they reached the second ice field on the second day but were caught in a storm. Three days later, they were spotted near the "Flatiron" before disappearing. Rescue attempts failed due to iced rocks and fresh snow. A month later, an airplane crew spotted one of their bodies at the third ice field, now called the "Death Bivouac." Notably, this tragedy was the first observed by spectators with telescopes.

The next attempt in July 1936 involved Andreas Hinterstoisser and Toni Kurz with Willy Angerer and Edi Rainer, climbing as separate two-man teams on a route west of Sedlmayr/Mehringer's. They joined forces after Hinterstoisser pioneered a traverse now named after him. On the second day, they were seen crossing the second ice field before visibility worsened. On the third day, still near the Flatiron, they began descending, with one climber appearing injured. Caught in a storm, they were likely swept away by an avalanche, with only Kurz surviving initially. Rescuers couldn't reach him, and he died overnight while attempting to rappel to them. The recovery of the bodies took until the next summer, when Sedlmayr's body was also found.

Three days after the 1936 tragedy, the Canton of Bern issued a climbing ban on the Eiger-Nordwand, which was legally unenforceable and lifted by November 1936. Alpine rescue stations were relieved of their duty to assist on the face.

In July 1937, Salzburg climbers Bertl Gollackner and Franz Primas entered the Northeast Face to scout the Eiger-Nordwand for a first ascent. Expecting a same-day return, they carried minimal gear. Difficulties, bad weather, and a rope fall forced two nights in the face and on the Mittellegi Ridge. Gollackner died of exhaustion after two more nights, while Primas was rescued 200 meters below the summit.

In August 1937, Mathias Rebitsch and Ludwig Vörg climbed several rope lengths above the Death Bivouac but retreated after a storm. This was the first successful retreat from high on the face, aided by a rope left in the Hinterstoisser Traverse.

In June 1938, Italians Mario Menti and Bortolo Sandri died near the Difficult Crack after a thunderstorm, becoming the eighth and ninth victims.

The first ascent was achieved a month later by Anderl Heckmair, Ludwig Vörg, Fritz Kasparek, and Heinrich Harrer. The two teams entered separately; Heckmair and Vörg initially retreated due to weather concerns. On July 22, they re-entered, overtaking Kasparek and Harrer between the second and third ice fields. Benefiting from pre-cut steps and twelve-point crampons (Kasparek had ten-point crampons, Harrer none), Heckmair led. After surviving an avalanche together, the teams united. After two more bivouacs and three days of climbing in poor weather and constant avalanches, they reached the summit at 3:30 a.m. on July 24.

=== Ascents until 1959 ===
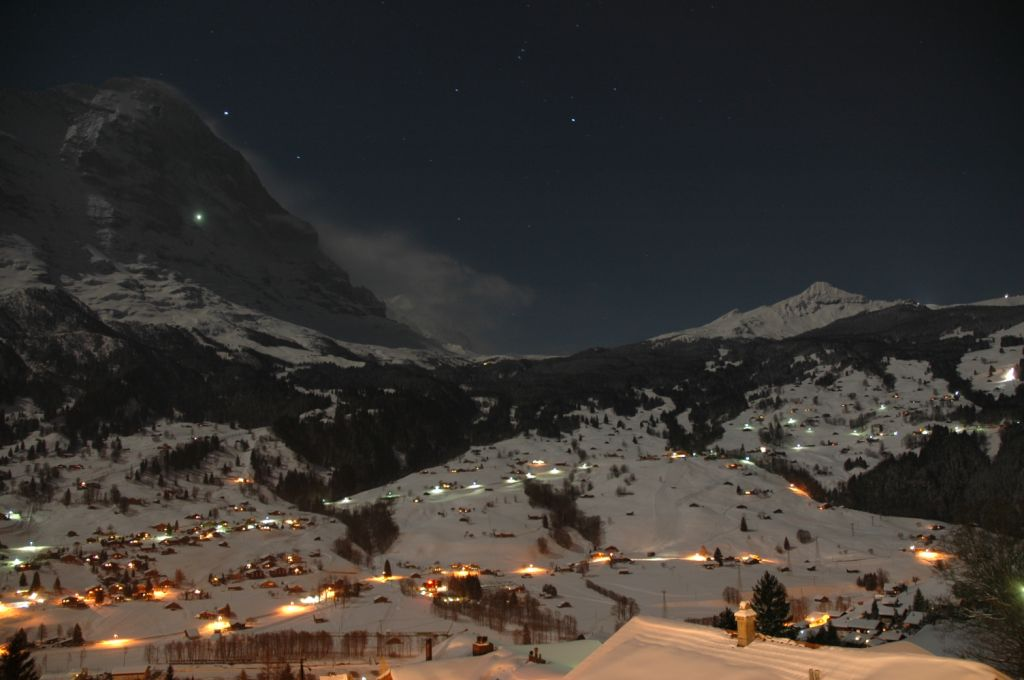
Eiger and surroundings at night, with the Eigerwand Station illuminated on the Eiger-Nordwand

In August 1946, Swiss climbers Edwin Krähenbühl and Hans Schlunegger reached the Ramp Ice Field but retreated due to a storm. The first repeat of the Heckmair Route came in July 1947 by Frenchmen Lionel Terray and Louis Lachenal. The third ascent, by Swiss climbers Karl and Hans Schlunegger with Gottfried Jermann in August 1947, was hampered by a storm above the Ramp Ice Field.

In July 1950, Austrians Leo Forstenlechner and Erich Waschak completed the first one-day ascent of the Eiger-Nordwand in 18 hours, overtaking a Swiss team (Jean Fuchs, Marcel Hamel, Raymond Monney, Robert Seiler), who achieved the fifth ascent a day later.

In summer 1952, a rush on the face saw Frenchmen Maurice Coutin and Pierre Julien achieve the sixth ascent on July 23. Four days later, Austrians Josef Larch and Karl Winter completed the seventh. On July 29, the eighth ascent was made by teams of Hermann Buhl/Sepp Jöchler, Otto Maag/Sepp Maag, and Frenchmen Jean Bruneau, Paul Habran, Pierre Leroux, Guido Magnone, and Gaston Rébuffat, who became the first to climb all three great Alpine north faces. The ninth ascent was by Karl Lugmayer, Hans Ratay, and Erich Vanis on August 8, followed by the tenth by Karl Blach and Jürgen Wellenkamp on August 15. Siegfried Jungmaier and Karl Reiss secured the eleventh, attempting a new route between the Death Bivouac and the Spider.

In August 1953, Ueli Wyss and Karlheinz Gonda climbed the face, attempting a direct route from the Flatiron to the Spider but died on the summit ice field; they were credited with the twelfth ascent. Five days later, Albert Hirschbichler and Erhard Riedl completed the thirteenth.

In August 1957, the "Corti-Drama" involved Italians Claudio Corti and Stefano Longhi, and Germans Günter Nothdurft and Franz Mayer. The Italians climbed east of the standard route and were joined by the Germans at the Hinterstoisser Traverse. Straying from the normal route, they sought a path to the Spider 150 meters above the Götterquergang. Longhi fell and was stranded on a ledge, while Corti, hit by rockfall at the "Corti Bivouac," could not continue. The Germans climbed out to seek help but died during the descent, missing rescuers by hours. Corti was rescued two days later by about 70 alpinists and rescuers from five countries using a steel cable device anchored at the summit ridge—the first successful rescue from the face. Longhi's body was recovered two years later, and Nothdurft and Mayer's bodies were found in September 1961 in the West Flank. They were posthumously credited with the 14th ascent. The first Italian ascent was achieved in August 1962 by Armando Aste's team.

In August 1958, Kurt Diemberger and Wolfgang Stefan completed the 15th ascent. Lukas Albrecht and Adolf Derungs reached the summit as the 16th team in August 1959, followed by Ernst Forrer and Peter Diener in September.

=== 1960 to 1969 ===
From 1960, climbers attempted solo, winter, or new-route ascents. In February 1960, Lothar Brandler, Jörg Lehne, and Siegi Löw failed a winter first ascent, as did Josef Larch and Karl Frehsner days later.

From March 6–12, 1961, Walter Almberger, Toni Kinshofer, and Anderl Mannhardt, and Toni Hiebeler achieved the first winter ascent. They climbed to the Stollenloch in February, resuming a week later after a weather break, earning recognition despite not climbing in one push.

On August 28, 1961, Tyrolean Adi Mayr died attempting a solo ascent, falling from the Waterfall Chimney after reaching the Death Bivouac. Two more solo attempts in 1962 ended fatally: Swiss Adolf Derungs below the Hinterstoisser Traverse and Austrian Diether Marchart in the Ice Hose. A women's first ascent attempt by Swiss Loulou Boulaz, Yvette Attinger, and Michel Vaucher failed due to bad weather, as did Walter Bonatti's solo attempt at the second ice field. On August 2–3, 1963, Michel Darbellay achieved the first solo ascent.

From August 13–15, 1962, Walter Almberger climbed again with Klaus Hoi, Hugo Stelzig, and Adi Weißensteiner, becoming the first to ascend the face in both summer and winter.

In August 1963, Spaniards Alberto Rabadá and Ernesto Navarro died near the Spider after a storm hit four days into their climb. During their recovery, Swiss climbers Paul Etter, Ueli Gantenbein, and Sepp Henkel made the first full rappel descent of the face in three days in December.

In January 1964, Werner Bittner, Rainer Kauschke, Peter Siegert, and Gerd Uhner failed a four-day attempt at a Direttissima. From September 1–4, 1964, Daisy Voog became the first woman to climb the face, guided by Werner Bittner, marking the 51st ascent.

In August 1965, Mitsumasa Takada completed the first Japanese ascent of the Heckmair Route under dramatic conditions. After a storm hit on the second day at the third ice field with Tsuneaki Watabe, they fought through ice and snow. A third bivouac was forced in the exit cracks. On the fourth day, Watabe fell and was injured, hanging in the rope below the summit ice field. Takada climbed the final 300 meters unsecured to the summit, descending the West Flank to alert help, but Watabe had died and was later recovered near the face's base.

From February to March 1966, a British-American-German team opened a Direttissima route, named after John Harlin, who died in a rope failure below the Spider, prompting the three separate teams to unite. Climbers included Dougal Haston, Siegfried Hupfauer, Jörg Lehne, Chris Bonington, Don Whillans, Günther Strobel, and Karl Golikow.

In March 1967, Frenchman Roland Trivellini vanished during a solo attempt on this route. Four months later, Fritz Eske, Günter Kalkbrenner, Kurt Richter, and Günter Warmuth died below the Hinterstoisser Traverse in poor visibility, moving partially unroped. By September 1, 1967, Frenchwoman Christine de Colombel became the second woman to climb the face, with Jack Sangnier.

A six person team Japanese team led by Takio Kato opened a second Direttissima from July to August 1969. The other team members were Kato's brother Yasuo Kato, Satoru Nigishi, Amano Hirofumi, Susumu Kubo and Michiko Imai (the only female member). Extensive equipment was used during the ascent of the new line which, running to the right of both the Harlin route and Heckmair's 1938 Route, crossed the overhanging Rote Fluh. This was the first time that a female climber had been involved in establishing a new route on the Eiger's North Face. The group was drawn from the Japanese Expert Climber's Club, a small club made up of some of the best climbers in Japan and, according to Dougal Haston who had made the first ascent of the Harlin route three years earlier, they were "recognized in Japanese circles as one of the strongest that could be put together in that country".

=== 1970 to 1979 ===
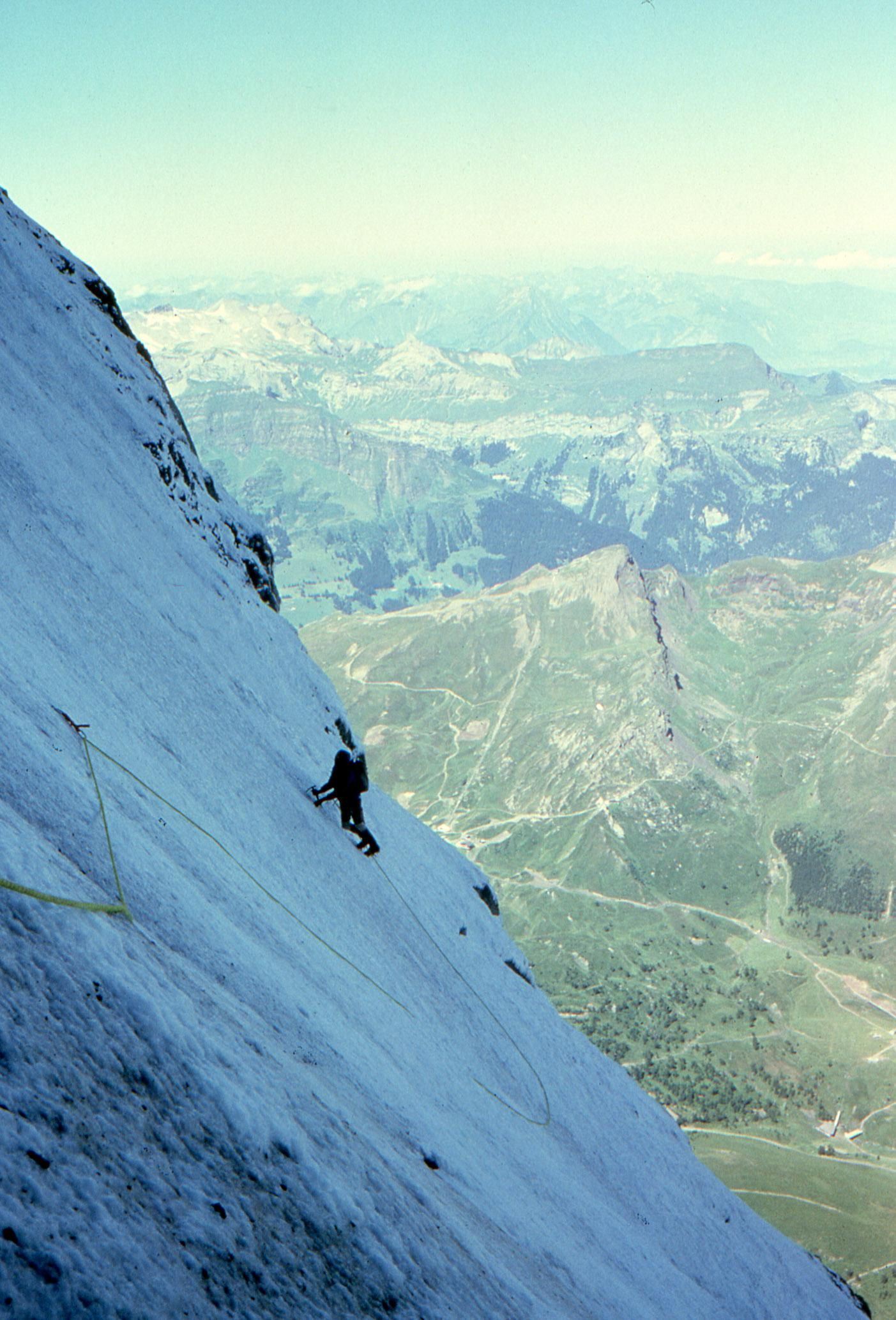
Climbers in the second ice field (1979).

The "Japanese Direttissima" or "Summer Direttissima," opened in August, was repeated in January 1970 by Swiss climbers Otto von Allmen, Max Dörfliger, Peter Jungen, Hans Müller, and Hanspeter Trachsel. That same month, the first winter rescue occurred, with Japanese climber Kenji Kimura, injured in the exit cracks, extracted via a steel cable device.

In September 1971, the first helicopter rescue from the face occurred when pilot Günther Amann airlifted Germans Peter Siegert and Martin Biock from the second ice field's edge. Caught in a storm, they had lost their stove and spent three days in the face, complicating their rescue by descending from the Death Bivouac.

In August 1973, Polish women Wanda Rutkiewicz, Danuta Geller-Wach, and Stefania Egierszdorff became the first all-female team to climb the face.

In August 1974, Reinhold Messner and Peter Habeler set a speed record for roped teams on the Heckmair Route in ten hours, overtaking three other teams.

In August 1976, Czech climbers Jiří Smíd, Sylva Kysilková, Petr Plachecky, and Josef Rybička opened a new route west of the Japanese Direttissima, the "Czech Pillar," ending at about 3,700 m on the West Ridge. The "Czech Route II," opened from January to February 1978 in the eastern face, also stops short of the summit.

From March 3–9, 1978, Japanese climber Tsuneo Hasegawa achieved the first winter solo ascent of the Heckmair Route, narrowly beating Frenchman Ivano Ghirardini, who that season became the first to climb all three great Alpine north faces in winter.

In April 1978, a Czech team failed to open a new Direttissima between existing routes. Dieter Smeikal was airlifted from the second ice field with severe frostbite on April 24, and five days later, Jiří Pechouš and Jiří Šlégl died above the Spider. In August 1979, Michel Piola and Gérard Hopfgartner opened the "Geneva Pillar," the first modern free-climbing route.

=== 1980 to 1989 ===
In February 1980, Vorarlberg's Claudia Heissenberger became the first woman to climb the face in winter, with Wolfgang Loacker, Beat Kammerlander, Dietmar Galehr, and 17-year-old Wilfried Amann, the youngest Eiger-Nordwand climber to date.

In 1981, Briton Eric Jones soloed the Heckmair Route, filmed by Leo Dickinson from a helicopter drop-off near the Death Bivouac. Jones had climbed the face with partners in 1970. The footage became the documentary "Eiger Solo."

In August 1981, Swiss Ueli Bühler set a solo speed record on the Heckmair Route in eight hours. Two days later, Marcel Rüedi, Hans Howald, and Christel Howald climbed the challenging 1,300 m North Arête in the eastern face, followed by the Heckmair Route.

In summer 1982, two new free-climbing routes emerged in the western face: the "Knez Route" by soloist Franček Knez and "Schlupfloch" by Swiss climbers Kaspar Ochsner and Urs Brunner. From March to April 1983, Slovak Pavel Pochylý soloed the "Ideal Direttissima" from the base to the summit, following Mehringer/Sedlmayr's 1935 route to the second ice field and a 1978 Czech-explored route above. Thomas Bubendorfer set a solo speed record in July 1983, climbing the Heckmair Route in four and a half hours after scouting it with Peter Rohrmoser.

Also in July 1983, Michel Piola and René Ghilini opened a new Direttissima in the western face over the prominent pillar above the Rote Fluh. In March 1985, Czechs Jiří Šmíd, Michal Pitelka, and Čestmír Lukeš opened the "Toni Hiebeler Memorial Route." In July 1985, Slovenians Franček Knez, Marjan Frešer, and Dani Tič established the "Slovenian Route" in the eastern face. In September 1985, Daniel H. Anker soloed the North Arête.

Climbers then focused on repeating known routes, with shorter new routes through small face sections gaining less recognition or not considered independent.

=== 1990 to 1999 ===
The decade began with Slovenian Slavko Svetičič's 27-hour solo ascent of the John Harlin Direttissima in January 1990. On February 24, 1991, Swiss Martin Beerli made the first paragliding launch from the Eiger-Nordwand. From February to March 1991, American Jeff Lowe soloed the "Métanoïa" route without bolts, repeated only in December 2016 by Thomas Huber, Roger Schäli, and Stephan Siegrist.

On March 10, 1992, Catherine Destivelle made history as the first woman to solo the Heckmair Route in winter, in one day. In summer 1994, a Dutch team was rescued via "Longline-Technique" by helicopter from the upper Geneva Pillar. In January 1996, the first night rescue extracted a poorly equipped Swiss team from the Götterquergang.

In October 1997, 72-year-old Italian Benedetto Salaroli, guided by Ueli Bühler and Kobi Reichen, became the oldest climber to ascend the Heckmair Route from the Stollenloch.

In September 1999, guides Evelyne Binsack, Stephan Siegrist, Hansruedi Gertsch, and Ralf Dujmovits climbed the Heckmair Route for a televised "Eiger-Nordwand Live" broadcast online.

=== 2000 to 2009 ===
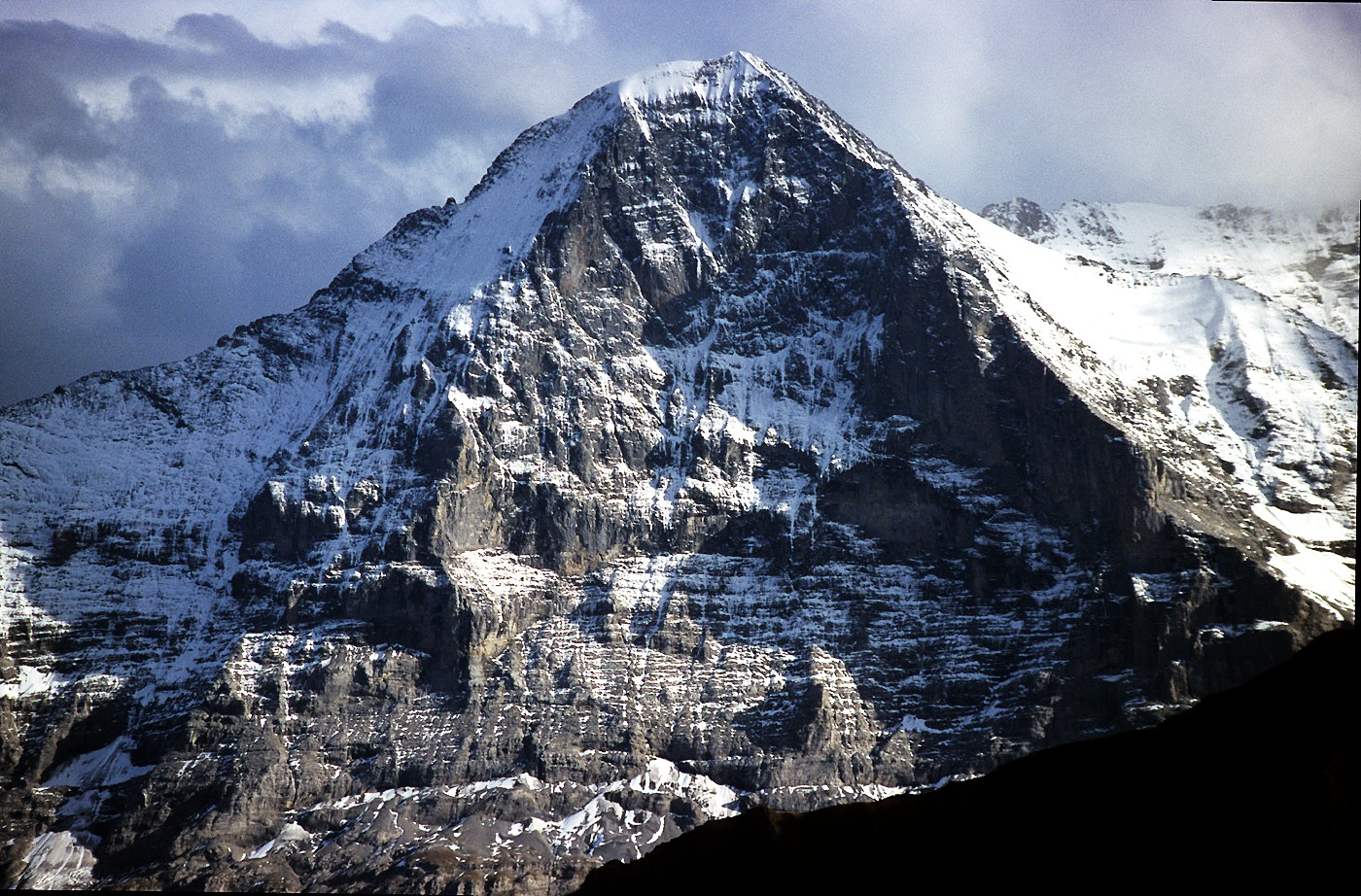
North view of the Eiger

In August 2000, Daniel H. Anker and Stephan Siegrist completed "La Vida es Silbar," the most technically demanding free-climbing route to date, a 900 m climb from the Stollenloch over the Rote Fluh and Czech Pillar to the West Ridge, developed since 1998.

On September 12, 2000, Englishman Matthew Hayes and New Zealander Phillip O'Sullivan died falling from the second ice field, filmed by a British TV crew and witnessed by writer Joe Simpson, who described it in "The Beckoning Silence."

In October 2001, Stephan Siegrist and Ueli Steck opened "The Young Spider," a direct route from the Eigerwand Station through the Death Bivouac and Spider to the summit wall, the first direct route since the 1983 Ideal Direttissima.

For the documentary "Eiger-Nordwand – In the Footsteps of the First Ascenders," Siegrist and Michal Pitelka climbed the Heckmair Route in August 2002 with 1938-era gear, filmed by Thomas Ulrich. Pitelka had soloed the route in 1992, and Siegrist had climbed it three times.

In July 2004, Siegrist and Steck set a roped team speed record on the Heckmair Route in nine hours, beating Messner/Habeler's 1974 record by one hour. In March 2003, Christoph Hainz set a solo speed record of four and a half hours, sparking further speed records.

In January 2005, Italians Claudio Chiaudano and Roberto Moreschi died in the shattered pillar area for unclear reasons, marking the 62nd and 63rd deaths, per Rainer Rettner.

In September 2005, John Harlin III, with Robert Jasper and Daniela Jasper, climbed the face 39 years after his father's death, documented in the 2007 film "The Alps."

In February 2006, Russians Jewgenij Dmitrienko, Wladimir Archipow, Pawel Malygin, and Dmitri Tsyganow opened the "Russian Direttissima" near the Pochylý Route.

On February 21, 2007, Ueli Steck set a solo speed record on the Heckmair Route in 3 hours, 54 minutes, improving to 2 hours, 47 minutes on February 13, 2008. That January, Simon Anthamatten and Roger Schäli set a roped team record of 6 hours, 50 minutes, surpassed a month later by Dani Arnold and Stephan Ruoss by 40 minutes.

In late March 2009, Fabian Eberli and Ueli Frey climbed the Heckmair Route but died in a storm on the West Flank during descent, recovered a week later. In August 2009, Robert Jasper and Roger Schäli made the first free ascent of the Japanese Direttissima.

=== Since 2010 ===
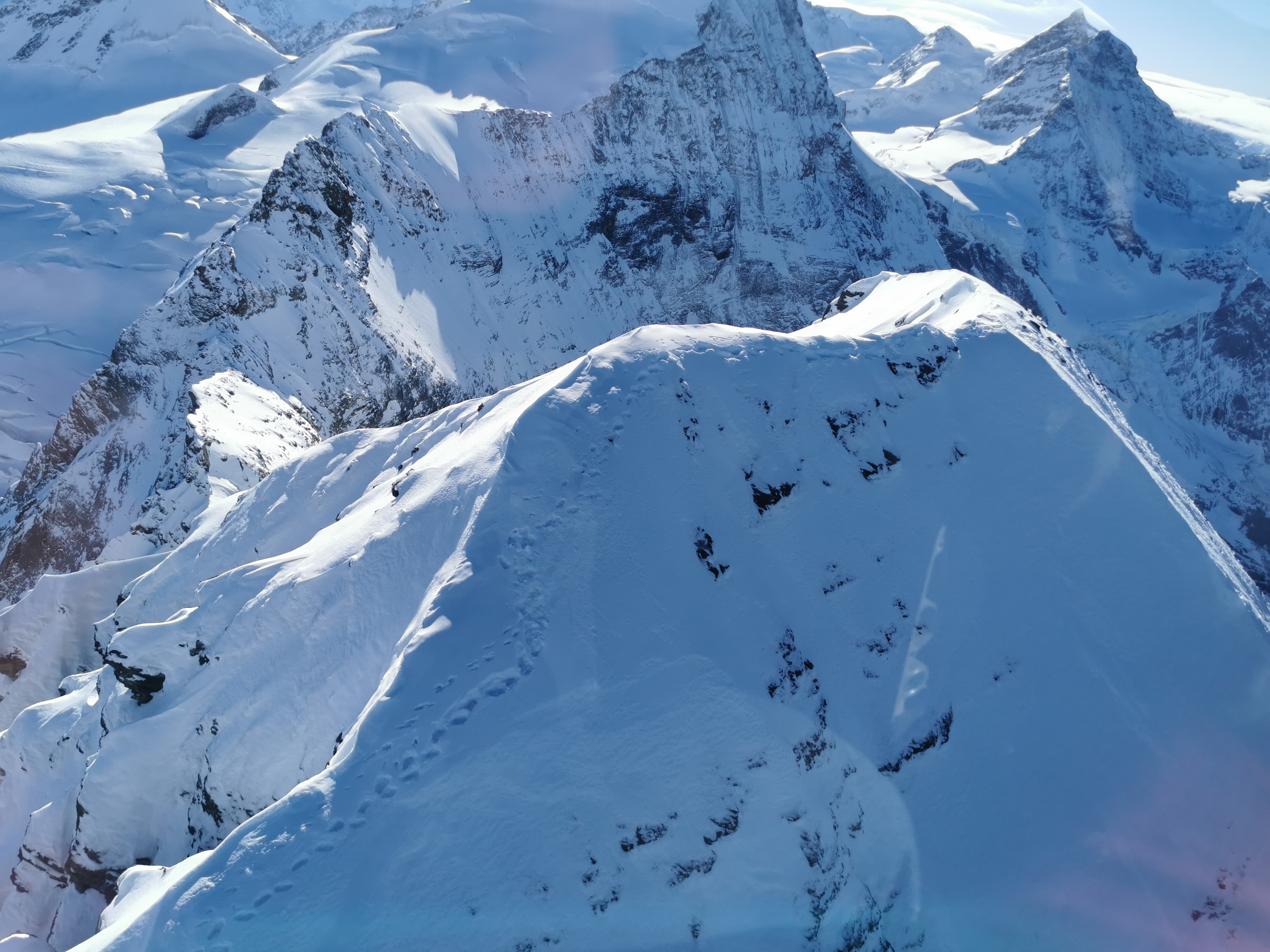
Above the Eiger-Nordwand ridge

On July 31, 2010, brothers Stefan and Robert Dietrich died below the Stollenloch.

In October 2010, Ueli Steck and Bruno Schläppi climbed the Heckmair Route in 5 hours, 3 minutes, setting a roped team record. In February 2011, Roger Schäli and Simon Gietl improved this by 38 minutes.

In April 2011, Dani Arnold soloed the route in 2 hours, 28 minutes, using fixed ropes in the Hinterstoisser Traverse and exit cracks.

In 2011, experienced Ticino climber Giovanni Quirici died on the Geneva Pillar, and in 2013, an Austrian climber died on the Lauper Route, pushing the death toll past 70.

On November 11, 2015, Ueli Steck and Nicolas Hojac set a roped team speed record on the Heckmair Route in 3 hours, 46 minutes. On November 16, Steck set a solo record of 2 hours, 22 minutes.

On March 31, 2017, Peter Habeler, aged 74, climbed the Heckmair Route with David Lama, becoming the oldest Eiger-Nordwand climber to date, documented for ServusTV's "Bergwelten."

In March 2022, 25-year-old Laura Tiefenthaler soloed the Heckmair Route in 15 hours.

In early September 2023, a 200-cubic-meter rockfall occurred near the Ghilini-Piola Direttissima, following a 20-degree temperature drop. Shortly before, Peter von Känel and Silvan Schüpbach completed the first ascent of the "Renaissance" route in that area. Another rockfall occurred in September 2024.

In 2017, Thomas Huber planned a new "clean line" route through the face's center. By March 2025, this failed for the fifth time, this time due to Stephan Siegrist's illness.

On April 5, 2025, Swiss Nicolas Hojac and Austrian Philipp Brugger set a speed record for a nonstop ascent of the north faces of the Eiger, Mönch, and Jungfrau in 15 hours, 30 minutes. They climbed the Eiger's Heckmair Route in total darkness in 5 hours, 43 minutes, beating Steck and Siegrist's 21-year-old record by nearly 10 hours.

== First ascent and Nazism ==
During the 1936 Summer Olympics, Adolf Hitler promised a gold medal to the first Eiger-Nordwand ascenders. On July 11, 1936, German ambassador to Austria Franz von Papen signed the July Agreement with Austria, seen by Hitler as a step toward the Anschluss. Nazi propaganda celebrated the presence of German and Austrian teams at the Eiger's base, viewing a joint ascent as a symbol of political unity.

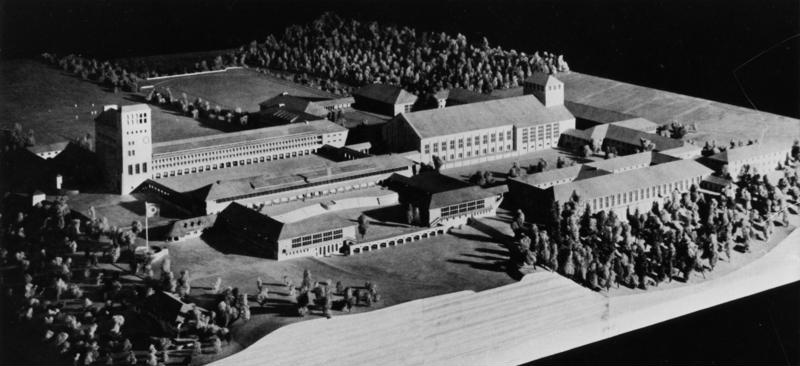
Model of the NS-Ordensburg Sonthofen, where Heckmair and Vörg were employed during the first ascent

In 1938, the NS-Ordensburg Sonthofen sought guides. Ludwig Vörg, already a sports instructor there, secured a position for Anderl Heckmair. They were given free rein for the climb and offered funding, which they declined, accepting only equipment support for modern gear.

Before the expedition, Harrer joined the SS (April 1, 1938) and NSDAP (May 1, 1938). He became an SS sports instructor as an SS-Oberscharführer, a role he later called a "stupid mistake" and "ideological error."

The Nazi propaganda hailed the first ascent as "testimony to the indomitable will of our youth." Karl Prusik was quoted: "A people with such sons cannot perish!" For Austrian-born Hitler, it proved the superiority of the "German master race." He met the team in Breslau, having followed their progress. The NSDAP's central publisher released "Um die Eiger-Nordwand" in 1938, detailing their experiences.

The first ascenders denied climbing "for the Nazis" but knew success could benefit their lives. Harrer hoped it would lead to a Nanga Parbat expedition. Kasparek accepted Heinrich Himmler's offer to join the SS.

== Climbing routes ==
=== Heckmair Route ===
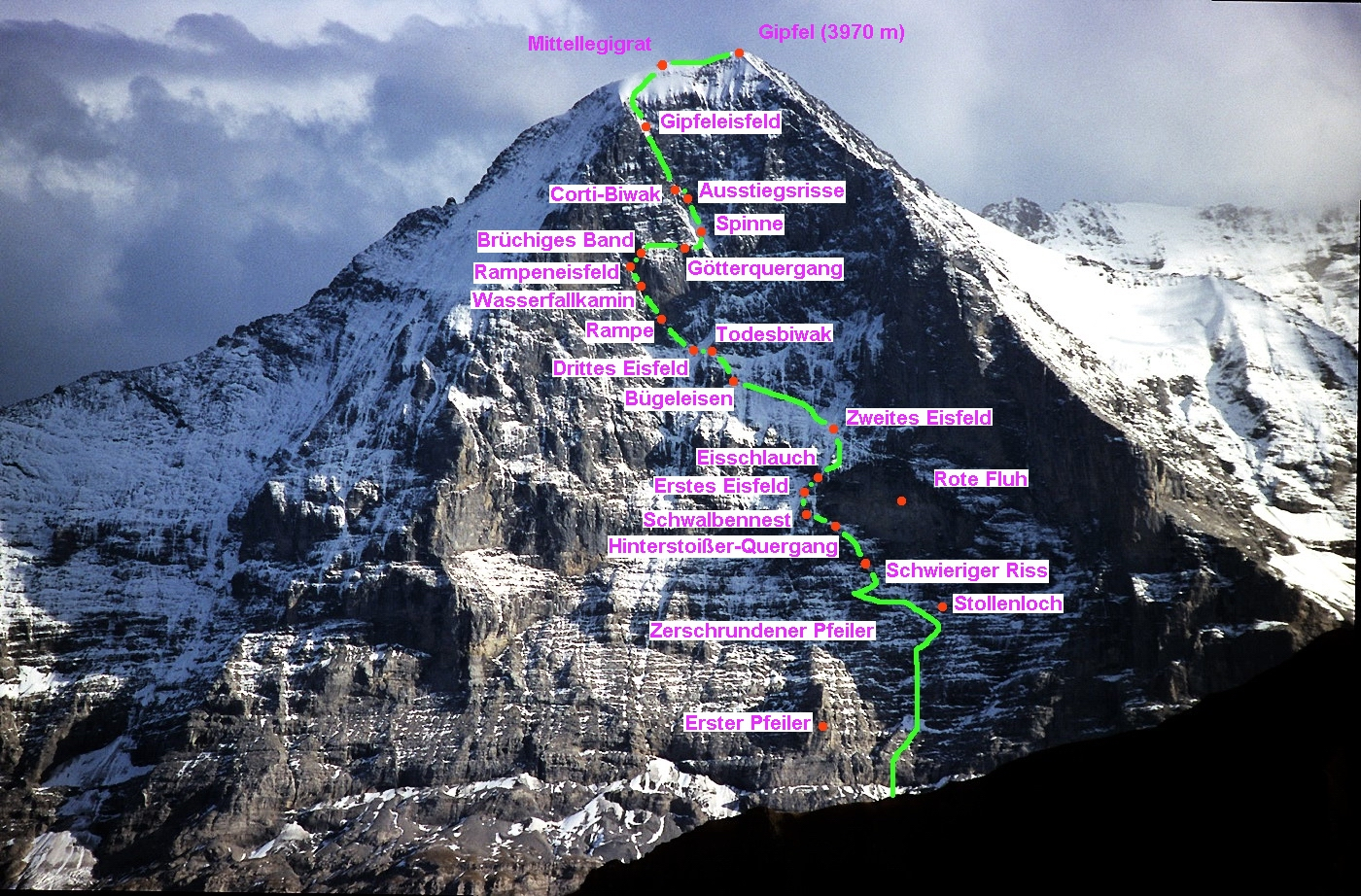
The Heckmair Route

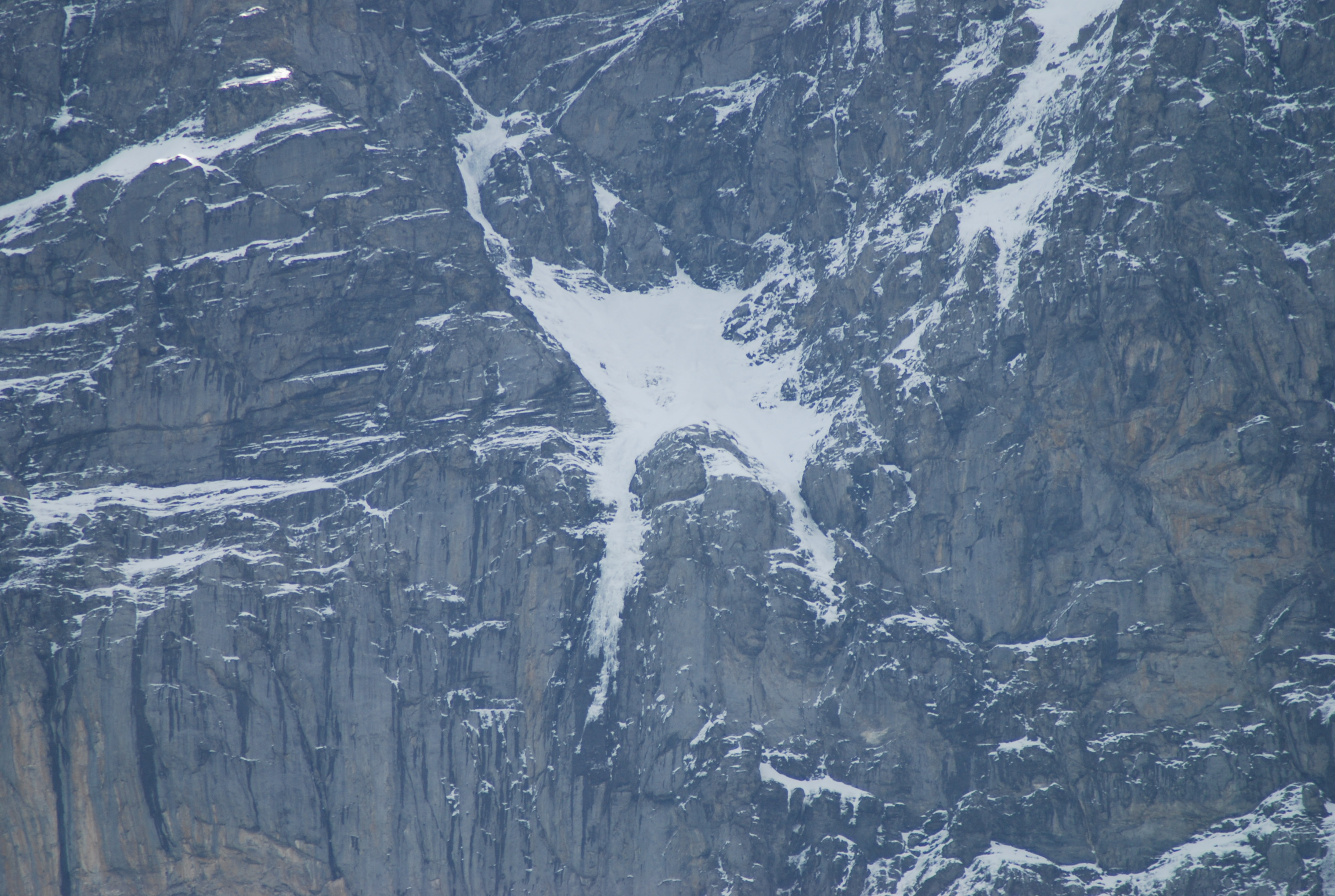
“Spider” route section

The most famous and the standard route is the Heckmair Route, rated TD (Très Difficile). Climbers must master V difficulties. The route takes two to three days, covering 4 km to ascend the 1,800 m face due to numerous traverses.

The route has 17 named features. Starting west of the First Pillar, it climbs directly before veering west to the Stollenloch, then east. The "Difficult Crack" (V, A0) is the first key section. The route skirts the "Rote Fluh," a smooth, light-colored wall, to the "Hinterstoisser Traverse," a 30 m slab secured with fixed ropes. Next is the "Swallow's Nest," a popular bivouac site after the first quarter. Via the "First Ice Field" and "Ice Hose," it reaches the "Second Ice Field," then east to the "Flatiron," a rock spur separating the second and third ice fields. Above lies the "Death Bivouac," named after Mehringer and Sedlmayr's last sighting. The "Third Ice Field" leads to the "Ramp," with the "Waterfall Chimney" (V, A0) and "Ramp Ice Field." The "Brittle Band" (Brittle Crack) leads west to the "Götterquergang." At its end is the "Spider," a firn field in the summit wall, resembling a spider with radiating couloirs. The route continues to the "Exit Cracks" and "Corti Bivouac," where Corti was rescued. It ascends to the "Summit Ice Field," ending on the Mittellegi Ridge to the summit.

=== Other climbing routes ===
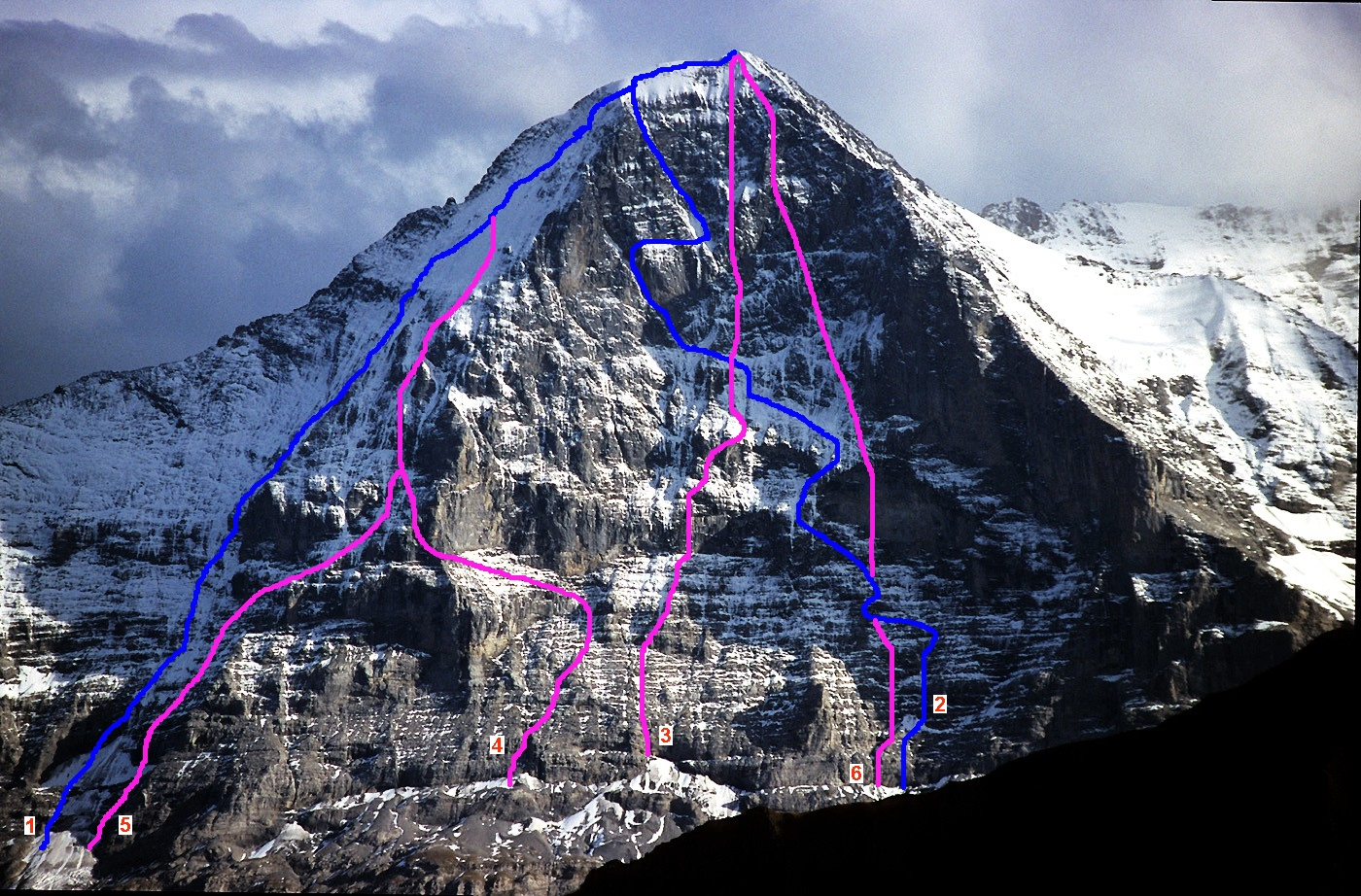
Routes from 1932 to 1969

Difficulty grades are listed under SAC mountaineering scale (TD and others) and climbing difficulties (V, 7c, A2, etc.).

It took 28 years after the first ascent for a new route in 1966, the "John Harlin Direttissima" (TD+, Mixed: M8-; Rock: Redpoint 7a; E5) by an international team including Jörg Lehne and Karl Golikow. In 1968, a Polish team climbed the "North Pillar" (edge between North and Northeast Faces) to the "Lauper Route" (named after Hans Lauper, TD). The direct "North Pillar" (TD) was climbed a day later by Reinhold and Günther Messner, Toni Hiebeler, and Fritz Maschke. In 1969, the "Japanese Direttissima" (TD+, Redpoint 8a) was opened with significant equipment and time.

In 1970, a Scottish team climbed the "Scottish Route" (TD) directly over the North Pillar. In 1976, Czechs opened the "Czech Route" (EX), diverging from the Heckmair Route at the Stollenloch to the West Ridge. In 1978, Czechs opened the "Second Czech Route," merging from the John Harlin Direttissima into the Lauper Route. In 1979, Swiss climbers opened the "Les Portes du Chaos" (TD, V) on the Geneva Pillar.

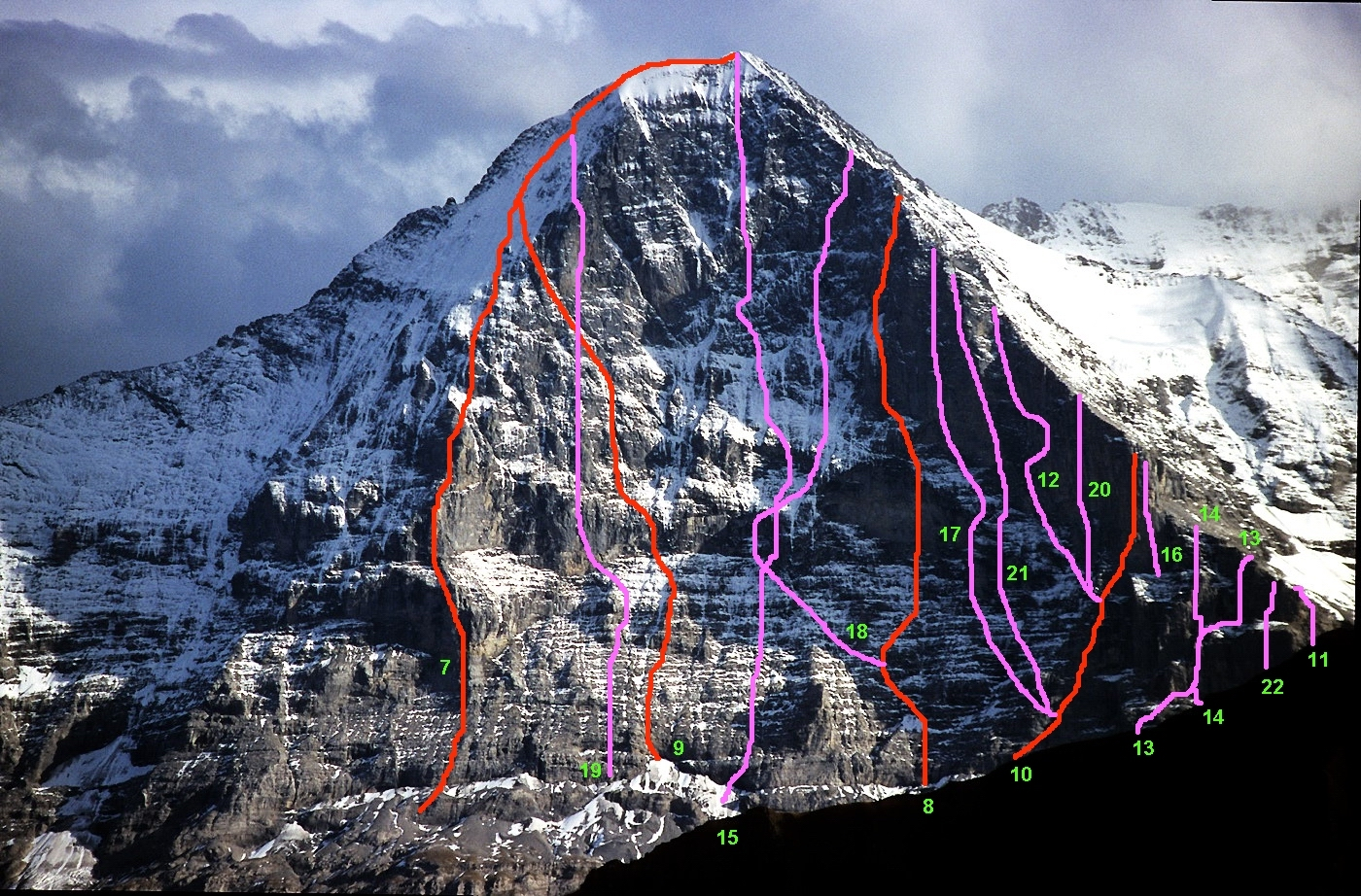
Routes from 1970 to 1988

In July 1980, the "Direct West Ridge" was first climbed. In 1981, three Swiss climbers ascended the "North Arête" (TD, VII-) via the Geneva Pillar. In 1982, Slovenian soloist Franček Knez (TD+, IV+) and Swiss Kaspar Ochsner and Urs Brunner (TD+, V) opened two routes in the western face. In 1983, Pavel Pochylý soloed the "Ideal Direttissima" (TD), followed by the "Spit Verdonesque Édenté" (EX, VIII, A1 or X-), the first alpine sport climbing route, and the "Piola-Ghilini Direttissima" (EX-) over the prominent pillar west of the Rote Fluh. In 1985, the "Hiebeler Memorial Route" and "Slovenian Route" (TD, VII) were opened. In 1988, Swiss climbers opened "Eigersanction" (TD, VII-, named after the 1975 film), Indonesians climbed "Yellow Angel" (EX, VII) in expedition style, and Swiss climbers opened "Löcherspiel," named for rock holes.

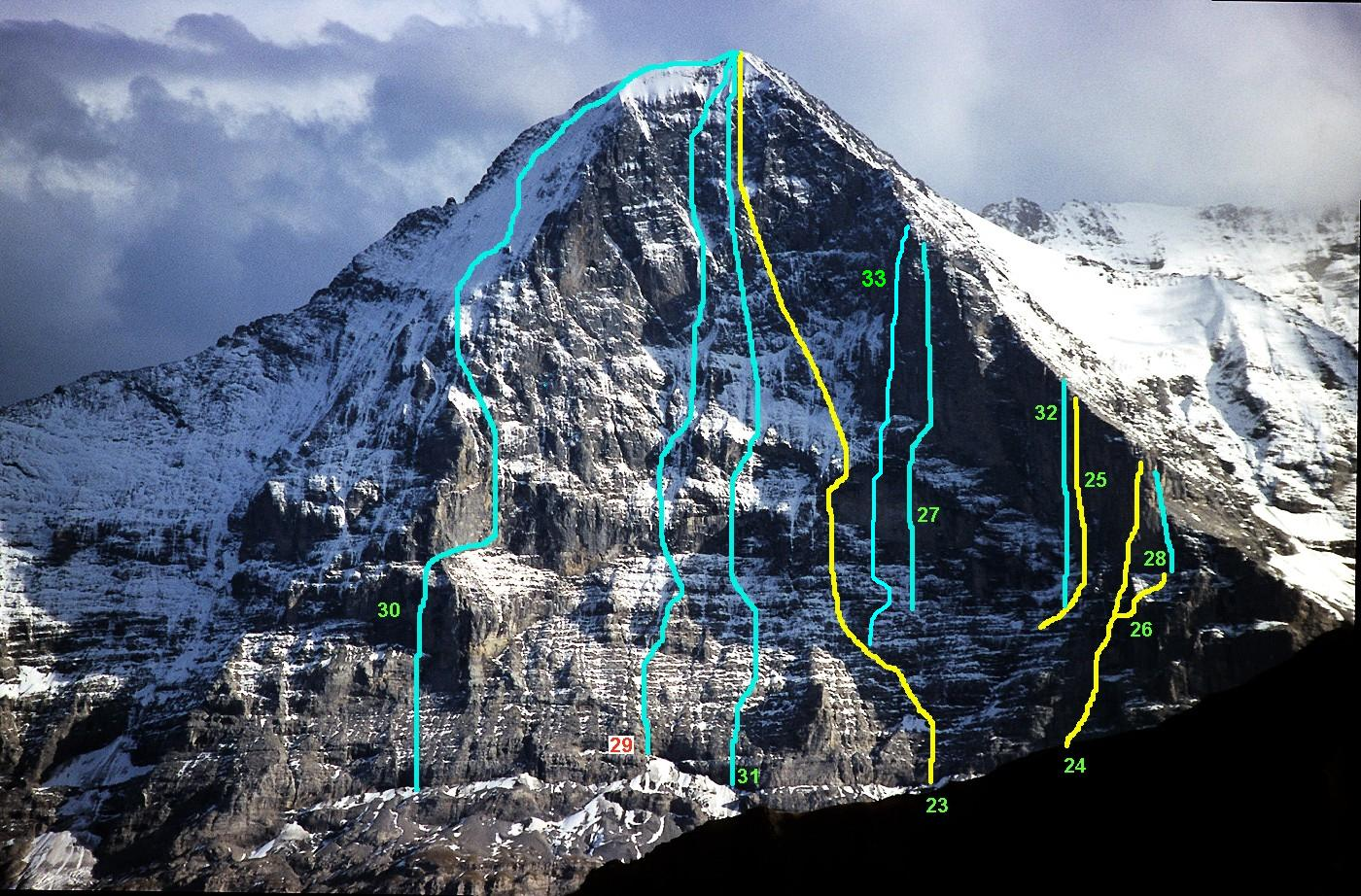
Routes from 1991 to 2008

In 1991, Jeff Lowe soloed "Métanoïa" between the Heckmair and John Harlin routes. In 1992, Swiss climbers completed "Le Chant du Cygne" (EX, VII) on the Geneva Pillar. In 1998, Italians climbed "Yeti" (EX+, IX+) between the North Arête and Eigersanction. In 1999, Germans Robert Jasper and Daniela Jasper linked "Chant du Cygne" to "Spit Verdonesque" via "Symphonie de Liberté" (8a, X-UIAA), the first 8a in a great Alpine north face.

In 2000, Swiss climbers climbed "La Vida es Silbar" (7c, IX+) from the Stollenloch over the Rote Fluh. In 2001, "Deep Blue Sea" (EX+, IX-) was opened west of Spit Verdonesque, named for the rock's bluish shimmer. Also in 2001, "The Young Spider" (EX+, 7a/A2, WI6, M7) was established. In 2002, "Griff ins Licht" (7c, M5) was opened on the North Pillar, and in 2006, the "Krasnoyarsk Direttissima." In 2003, "Magic Mushroom" (7c+, named after a 3,219 m mushroom-shaped pillar) emerged from the Dynamitloch to the West Ridge. "Paciencia" (8a or X-), the 33rd route, was attempted since 2003 and named after its first redpoint in August 2008. In 2009, Robert Jasper and Roger Schäli made the first free ascent of the Japanese Direttissima (August 28–31, 8a, X-UIAA), and in 2013, the Piola-Ghilini Direttissima (IX). In 2015, "Odyssee" (X-/8a+), the hardest route to date, was opened by Robert Jasper, Roger Schäli, and Simon Gietl. In 2023, Peter von Känel and Silvan Schüpbach opened "Renaissance" near the Ghilini-Piola Direttissima.

== In literature and film ==
Around 50 fictional works focus on the Eiger, mostly its North Face, including novels, stories, plays, poems, an epic poem, and a comic book.

In 1936, shortly after the Kurz tragedy, "Der Kampf um die Eiger Nordwand" appeared. Erika Jemelin's "Die Wand. Tagebuch eines jungen Bergsteigers" is a fictional diary of Toni Kurz, and Theo Lütolf's "Das Drama am Eiger" is a verse epic. In 1938, Gustav Renker's "Schicksal in der Nordwand" portrays the face as a symbol of man versus nature. Nine works emerged during the 1956–1966 "Eiger sensation." Ernst Nobs' 1956 novella "Die Wand" features an American woman climbing the face. Oswald Frey's 1959 "Im Schatten der grossen Wand" covers real climber Alfred Derung. Otto Zinniker's "Die Nordwand" explores why people climb. The Corti-Drama is depicted in Paul Townend's 1960 "Eigerjagd" (original: "The Man on the End of the Rope"), critiquing press sensationalism, and Whit Masterson's 1963 "Man on a Nylon String," where a hero aims to rescue a stranded climber. In 1970, Trevanian's "The Eiger Sanction" is a spy thriller set on the face, filmed by Clint Eastwood. Bob Langley's 1980 thriller "Traverse of the Gods" involves finding a Wehrmacht soldier. Dermot Somers' 1983 "Einbruch der Dunkelheit" links the face to a nuclear apocalypse. Simone Desmaison's "La face de l'ogre" explores climbers' and their families' psyches. Daniel Grevoz's 2000 "Flash-back sur l'Eiger" and Simon Mawer's 2007 "The Fall" follow Toni Kurz's path.

The North Face appears in documentaries and feature films. In 1936, "Die Eiger-Nordwand" was filmed, with Max Hermann capturing the Kurz rescue with a small camera. Early attempts to film a live ascent on the Heckmair Route failed due to technical and climbing challenges. In 1958 and 1959, climbers were filmed from the ridges. Leo Dickinson's 1970 "Out of the Shadows into the Sun" succeeded. "Nordwand – Mordwand" documents a 1988 ascent, with Harrer and Heckmair narrating their climb. Several documentaries recreated the 1935 and 1936 events. In 1962, Luis Trenker's "His Best Friend" depicted the ascent. Clint Eastwood's "The Eiger Sanction" adapted the novel. In 1980, Gerhard Baur's docudrama for Bavarian Radio, filmed at original locations, won multiple awards. The 2008 film "North Face" by Philipp Stölzl dramatizes the 1936 tragedy. The 1999 "Eiger-Live" broadcast and a 2000 ascent in historical gear were filmed. The latest documentary, Michael Gambon's IMAX "The Alps," captures a 2007 ascent.

== See also ==
- Alpine climbing
- El Capitan, a big wall climbing route in Yosemite

== Bibliography ==
- Uli Auffermann: Das große Eiger-Lexikon – Die Eiger-Nordwand von A–Z. Schall-Verlag, 2013, ISBN 978-3-900533-76-2.
- Uli Auffermann: Im Schatten der Nordwand – Triumph und Tragödie an Matterhorn, Eiger und Grandes Jorasses. Bruckmann Verlag, München 2011, ISBN 978-3-7654-5626-8.
- Daniel Anker (Ed.): Eiger – Die vertikale Arena. 4th, revised edition. AS Verlag, Zürich 2008, ISBN 978-3-905111-51-4.
- Kurt Oesterle: Mordwand und Todeskurve. Klöpfer & Meyer Verlag, Tübingen 2008, ISBN 978-3-940086-24-2.
- Rainer Rettner: Eiger – Triumphe und Tragödien. 1932–1938. AS Verlag, Zürich 2008, ISBN 978-3-909111-49-7.
- Heinz von Arx (Ed.), Benjamin Herrmann (Ed.): Nordwand – Das Drama des Toni Kurz am Eiger. AS Verlag, Zürich 2008, ISBN 978-3-909111-57-2.
- Daniel Anker, Rainer Rettner: Corti-Drama – Tod und Rettung am Eiger 1957–1961. AS Verlag, Zürich 2007, ISBN 978-3-909111-33-6.
- Heinrich Harrer: Die weiße Spinne. Das große Buch vom Eiger. 5th edition. Ullstein Verlag, Berlin 2006, ISBN 3-548-36229-X.
- Thomas Ulrich: Eiger-Nordwand: Mit Nagelschuhen und Hanfseil auf den Spuren der Erstbegeher. AS Verlag, Zürich 2003, ISBN 3-905111-86-1.
- Robert Jasper: Nordwand: Mein Leben mit dem Eiger. Delius Klasing Verlag, Hamburg 2015, ISBN 3-667-10295-X.
- Roger Schäli, Rainer Rettner, Jochen Hemmleb: Passion Eiger: Legendäre Routen damals und heute. AS Verlag, 2020, ISBN 978-3-03913-008-5.
