= Front pointing =

Technique in ice climbing and mountaineering

Ice climbers and mountaineers front-pointing

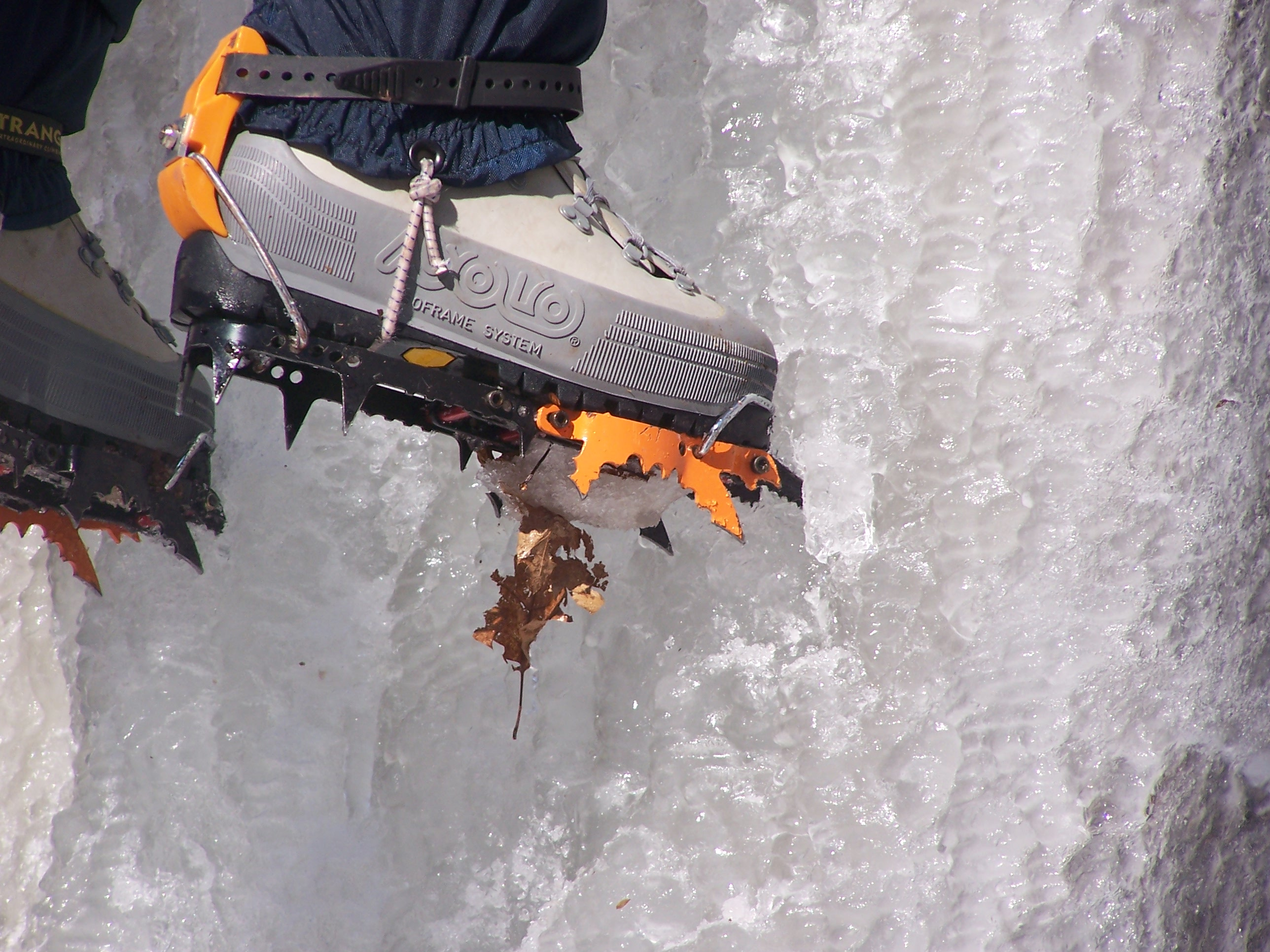
On hard ice

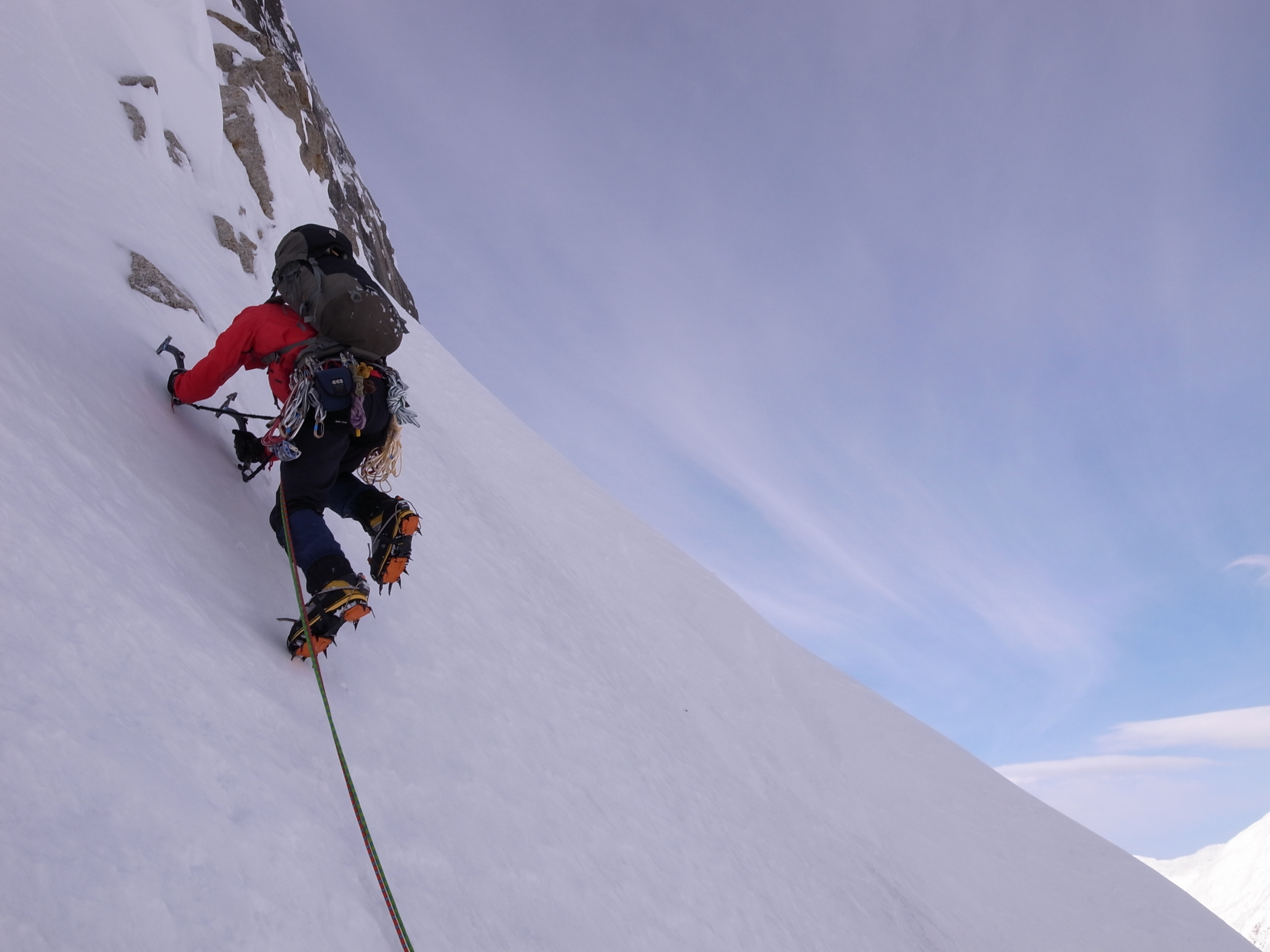
On snow slopes

Front-pointing (or German technique) is a technique used in mountaineering and ice climbing where a climber embeds, usually by a kicking action, the sharp metal 'front-point(s)' of their modern metal rigid crampon into the ice or hard packed snow to gain a secure foothold to assist their upward momentum on the climbing route.

Front-pointing places greater strain on the leg muscles than the French technique where the feet remain flat on the surface using the "duck foot" (feet pointing either side at 90 degrees), or the "flat foot" (moving diagonally up the slope). For steep slopes of about 45 degrees and upwards, the French technique is less feasible to execute. Some use a hybrid technique, the "pied troisieme" (or the 3 o'clock position), where one crampon (the lower one) is front-pointing while the other crampon is at a 90-degree sideways angle but still flat on the surface and following the French technique; this hybrid technique allows climbers to avoid the strain of full front-pointing when ascending snow slopes that are both long and steep.

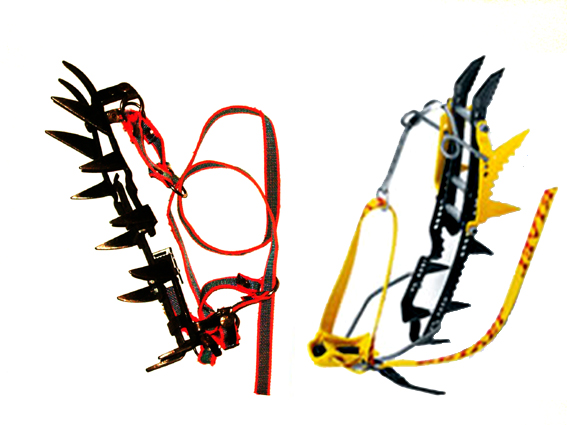
A crampon's two 'front points' can be horizontal (l) or vertical (r)

Front-pointing is an easy concept but takes experience to apply efficiently and safely. Ice climbers need to ensure that when kicking the front-points of their crampons into ice they do not shatter and break the wider surface. Novice ice climbers, and particularly those used to rock climbing, tend to raise their heels upward when front-pointing — as rock climbers do on footholds — which can cause the points of the crampon to shear out of the ice; experienced climbers drop their heels slightly. While front-pointing encourages a direct upward climbing style, ice climbers need to maintain a resting "triangle position", with the feet apart on either side of their centre of gravity (COG), and avoid their feet being together right under their COG.

Front-pointing dates from the early 1930s when Grivel added two front points to their 10-point crampon of the French technique. It came to international prominence when Heinrich Harrer, in his book about the famous 1938 first ascent of the Eiger north face, said "I looked back, down our endless ladder of [French technique] steps. Up it, I saw the New Era coming at express speed; there were two men running — I mean running, not climbing — up". The two men were Anderl Heckmair and Ludwig Vörg, who were front-pointing on the Eiger's second ice field. They joined with Heckmair and Fritz Kasparek to complete the climb. In the 1960s, Stubai bent the second row of points forward for additional "heel-dropping traction" when front-pointing (see image).

== See also ==
- Ice climbing
  - Mixed climbing
  - Dry tooling
- UIAA Ice Climbing World Championships
- Glossary of climbing terms
