= Anderl =

Anderl is both a given name and a surname.

Notable people with the given name include:

- Anderl Heckmair (1906–2005), German mountain climber and guide
- Anderl Molterer (1931–2023), Austrian alpine skier

Notable people with the surname include:

- Günter Anderl (1947–2015), Austrian figure skater
