= Fritz Kasparek =

Austrian mountaineer (1910–1954)

Personal information
- Nationality: Austrian
- Born: 3 July 1910 Vienna, Austria-Hungary
- Died: 6 June 1954 (aged 43) Salcantay, Peru

Climbing career
- First ascents: Tre Cime di Lavaredo Cima Grande; Eiger north face
- Known for: Eiger north face first ascent

Fritz Kasparek (3 July 1910 – 6 June 1954) was an Austrian mountaineer who was on the team that made the first successful ascent of the Eiger north face.

Kasparek gained his first alpine experiences on the Peilstein in the Wienerwald and in the Ennstaler Alps. After Emilio Comici had been the first to climb the north face of the Cima Grande of the Tre Cime di Lavaredo in 1933, in February 1938 Kasparek and Sepp Brunnhuber made the first winter ascent.

On 24 July 1938, with Anderl Heckmair, Ludwig Vörg and Heinrich Harrer, he made the first ascent of the north face of the Eiger. This climb, previously deemed impossible and described by Reinhold Messner as "a glorious moment in the history of mountaineering and a great sensation, since several climbers had previously perished on the face", made headlines around the world and is recounted in Heinrich Harrer's 1958 book, The White Spider. An early member of the Sturmabteilung, he was given the rank of SS-Unterscharrführer in 1941 and SS-Oberscharführer in 1944. He was imprisoned by the Allies after the war as a former SS member, and in 1951 was finally removed from the list of National Socialists who had to be registered.

Kasparek died in 1954, falling to his death through a broken snow cornice near the peak of the Salcantay in Peru.

== Autobiography ==
- Ein Bergsteiger. Fritz Kasparek, einer der Bezwinger der Eiger-Nordwand erzählt von seinen Bergfahrten, Verlag Das Bergland-Buch, Salzburg 1939
- Vom Peilstein zur Eiger-Nordwand. Erlebnisse eines Bergsteigers. New extended and improved edition of "Ein Bergsteiger", Verlag Das Bergland-Buch, Salzburg 1951
