= Heinrich Harrer =

Austrian mountaineer and author (1912–2006)

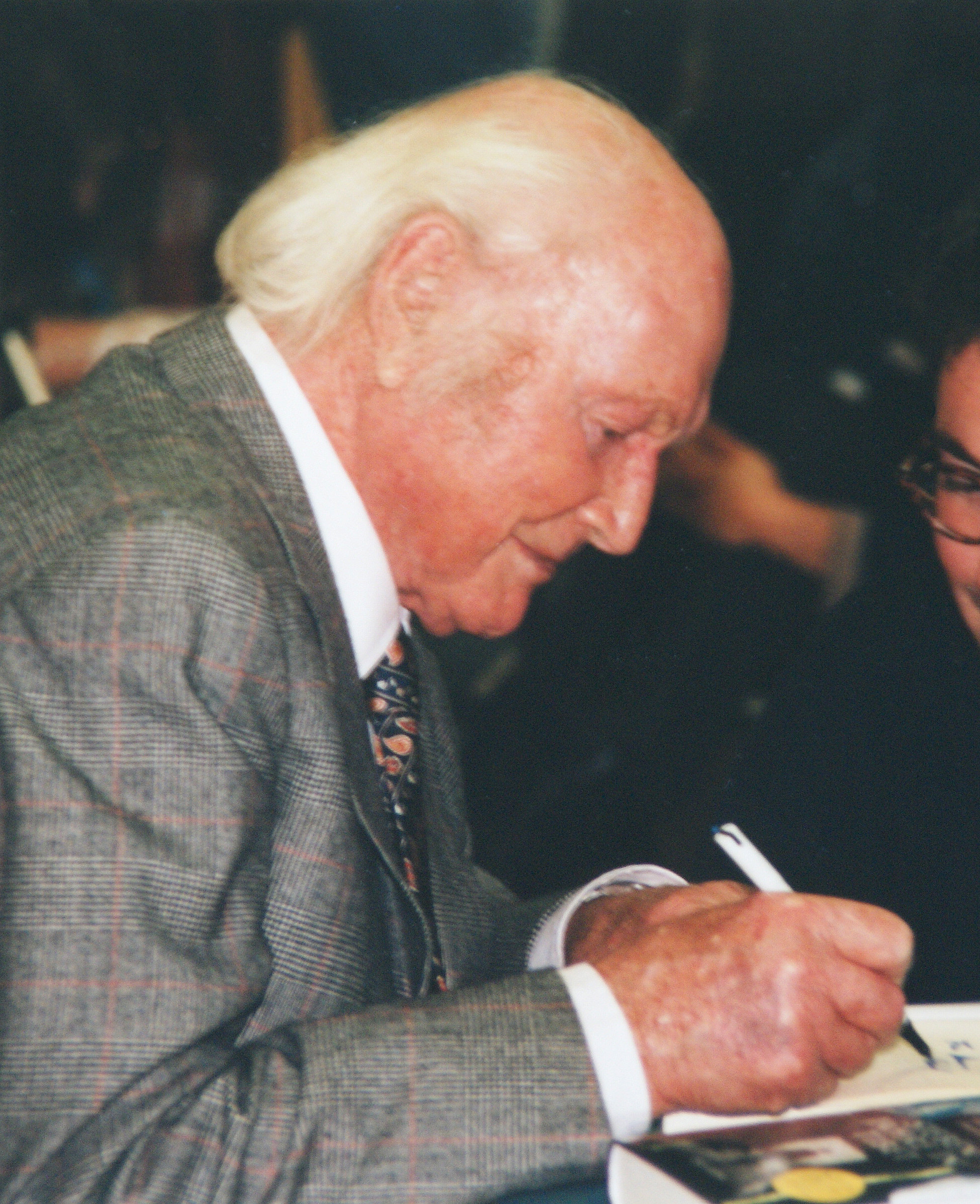
- Harrer in 1997
- Born: Heinrich Josef Harrer; 6 July 1912; Hüttenberg, Austria-Hungary
- Died: 7 January 2006 (aged 93); Friesach, Austria
- Education: University of Graz
- Occupations: Mountaineer; Sportsman; Geographer; Author
- Known for: Seven Years in Tibet (1952); The White Spider (1959)
- Spouses: Charlotte Wegener (m. 1938; div. 1943) Margarethe Truxa (m. 1953; div. 1958) Katharina Haarhaus (m. 1962)
- Relatives: Alfred Wegener (father-in-law)
- Website: www.harrerportfolio.com

Heinrich Harrer (German: [ˈhaɪnʁɪç ˈhaʁɐ]; 6 July 1912 – 7 January 2006) was an Austrian mountaineer, explorer, writer, sportsman, geographer, and an SS sergeant. He was a member of the four-man climbing team that made the first ascent of the North Face of the Eiger, the "last problem" of the Alps, in July 1938. Harrer and the team flew the Nazi flag atop the mountain. Harrer had joined the Nazi Party shortly after the annexation of Austria in March 1938, and was personally received by Hitler after the climb. A year later in 1939, he and the climbing team went on an expedition to the Indian Himalayas, where they were arrested by British colonial authorities due to the outbreak of World War II. He eventually escaped to Tibet, staying there until 1951. He is the author of two autobiographical books, Seven Years in Tibet (1952) and The White Spider (1959).

== Early life ==
Heinrich Harrer was born 6 July 1912 in Hüttenberg, Austria, in the district of Sankt Veit an der Glan in the state of Carinthia. His father, Josef Harrer, was a postal worker. From 1933 to 1938, Harrer studied geography and sports at the Karl-Franzens University in Graz. Harrer became a member of the traditional student corporation ATV Graz.

In 1935, Harrer was designated to participate in the Alpine skiing competition at the 1936 Winter Olympics in Garmisch-Partenkirchen. The Austrian Alpine skiing team, however, boycotted the event due to a conflict regarding the skiing instructors' status as professionals. As a result, Harrer did not participate.

In 1937, Harrer won the downhill event at the World Student Championships at Zell am See.

== Eiger North Face ==
Mountain climbing was Harrer's true passion. Knowing an extraordinary feat of climbing could win him a place on a Himalayan expedition, Harrer and a friend, Fritz Kasparek, resolved to be the first to climb the North Face of the Eiger (3,967 m, 13,025 ft) in Switzerland. The near vertical wall, with its ice-field known as The White Spider, had claimed several lives; and the Bernese authorities even banned climbing it. Following his final university exams in July 1938, Harrer and Kasparek traveled to Kleine Scheidegg at the foot of the Eiger and set out on their climb. Halfway up the mountain, Harrer and Kasparek encountered another team making the attempt, Ludwig Vörg and Anderl Heckmair from Germany. The four decided to make the rest of the climb as a single team, with the experienced Heckmair leading.

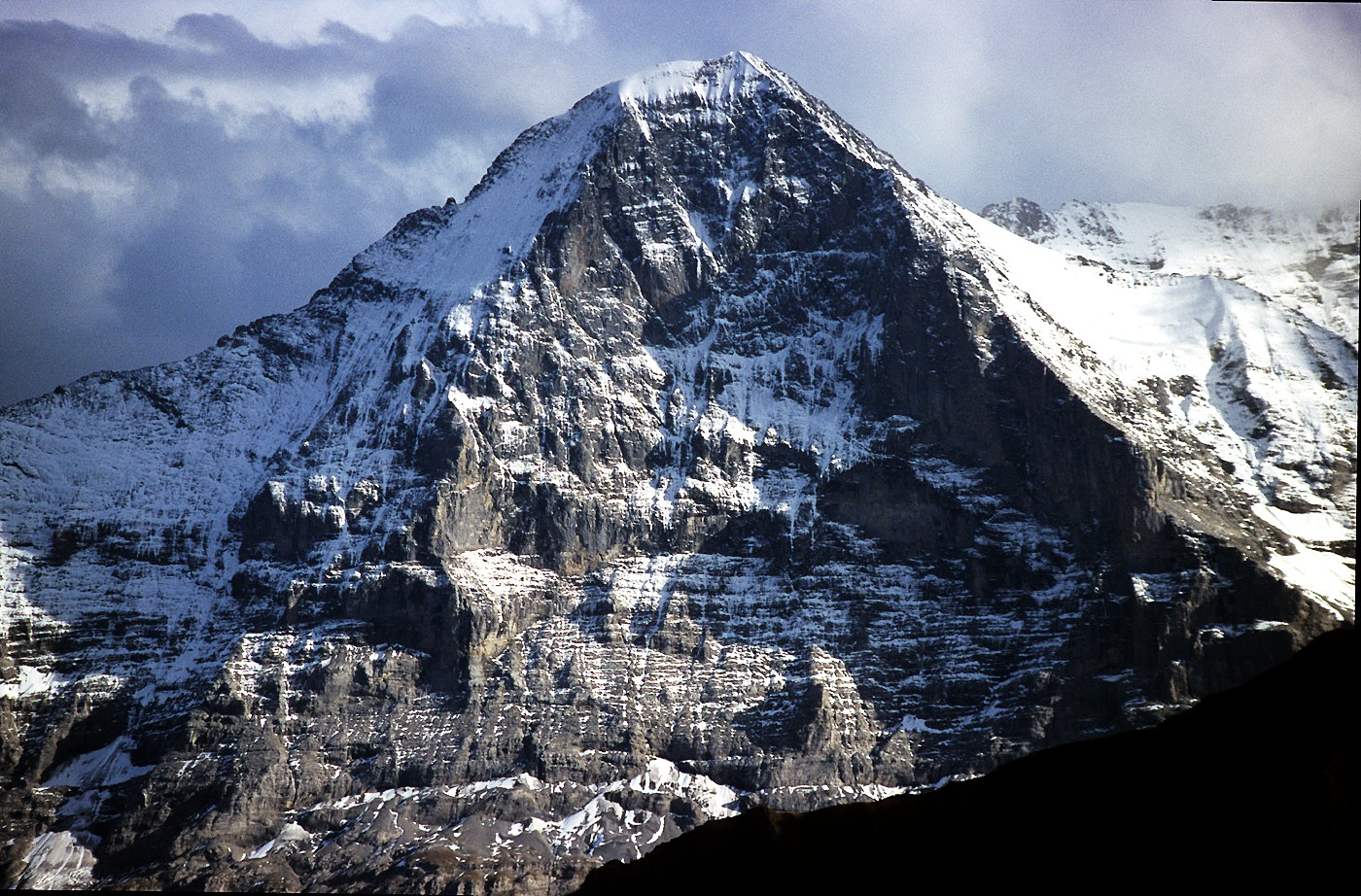
Eiger North Face, Bernese Alps, Switzerland

Throughout the climb, the four men were constantly threatened by snow avalanches and rock falls. They were caught in an avalanche as they climbed the White Spider on the upper face, but all possessed sufficient strength to resist being swept off the face. The members successfully reached the summit at four o'clock in the afternoon 24 July 1938. This first ascent of the Eiger North Face was described by Italian climber Reinhold Messner as "a glorious moment in the history of mountaineering and a great sensation, since several climbers had previously perished on the Face", made headlines around the world, and is recounted in Harrer's book The White Spider, published in 1959.

== Nazi involvement ==
In 1996, ORF editor and filmmaker Gerald Lehner found in American archives the membership card of Harrer, who joined the Sturmabteilung (SA) in October 1933. After the Anschluss of March 1938, as Germany annexed Austria, he joined the Schutzstaffel (SS) on 1 April. He held the rank of Oberscharführer (Sergeant), and on 1 May he became a member of the Nazi Party, which was required upon enlistment. After their ascent of the Eiger North Face, the four climbers were received by and photographed with Adolf Hitler. Harrer later said he wore his SS uniform only once, on the day of his marriage to Charlotte Wegener, daughter of the eminent explorer and scholar Alfred Wegener. After returning to Europe in 1952, Harrer was cleared of any pre-war crimes and this was later supported by Simon Wiesenthal. In his memoir, Beyond Seven Years in Tibet, Harrer called his involvement with the Nazi Party a mistake made in his youth, when he had not yet learned to think for himself.

== Internment in India ==
In 1939, Harrer joined a four-man expedition, led by Peter Aufschnaiter, to the Diamir Face of the Nanga Parbat with the aim of finding an easier route to the peak. Having concluded that the face was viable, the four mountaineers were in Karachi, India at the end of August, waiting for a freighter to take them home. The ship being long overdue, Harrer, Ludwig, and Hans Lobenhoffer tried to reach Persia (Iran), but several hundred kilometres north-west of Karachi they were arrested by British colonial authorities as enemy aliens and escorted back to Karachi, where Aufschnaiter had stayed. Two days later, war was declared, and on 3 September 1939 all were put behind barbed wire to be transferred to a detention camp at Ahmednagar near Bombay. They considered escaping to Portuguese Goa, but when further transferred to Dehradun to be detained there for years with 1,000 other enemy aliens, they found Tibet more promising, the final goal being the Japanese front in Burma or China.

Aufschnaiter and Harrer escaped and were re-captured a number of times before finally succeeding. On 29 April 1944, Harrer and six others, including Rolf Magener and Heins von Have (disguised as British officers), Aufschnaiter, the Salzburger Bruno Treipel (aka Treipl) and the Berliners Hans Kopp and Sattler (disguised as native Indian workers), walked out of the camp. Magener and von Have took the train to Calcutta and from there found their way to the Japanese army in Burma.

The others headed for the closest border via Landour. After Sattler gave up on 10 May, the remaining four entered Tibet on 17 May 1944, crossing the Tsang Chok-la Pass (5,896 m, 19,350 ft) and thereafter split into two groups: Harrer and Kopp, Aufschnaiter and Treipel. On 17 June, Treipel, exhausted, bought himself a horse and rode back to the lowlands. Several months later, when the remaining three were still without visas for Tibet, Kopp also gave up and left for Nepal (where he was handed over to British colonial authorities within a few days).

== Seven years in Tibet ==
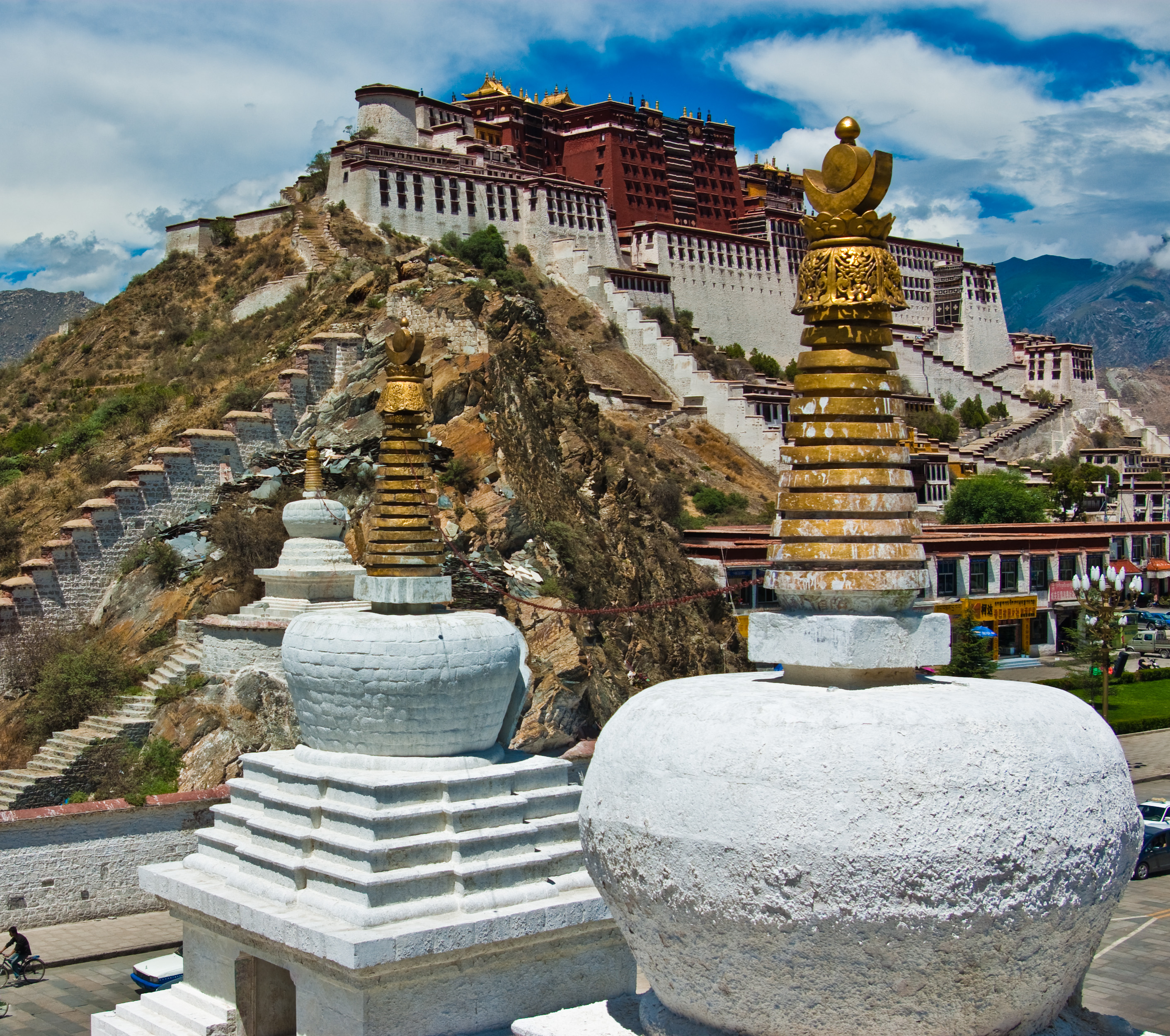
The Pargo Kaling chorten (front) were demolished during the Cultural Revolution and reconstructed by Lhasa authorities in 1995.

Aufschnaiter and Harrer, helped by the former's knowledge of the Tibetan language, proceeded to Tibet's capital city, Lhasa, which they reached on 15 January 1946 (eight months after Nazi Germany's surrender), having crossed Western Tibet, the South-West with Gyirong County, and the Northern Changthang.

In 1948, Harrer became a salaried official of the Tibetan government, translating foreign news and acting as the Court photographer. Harrer first met the 14th Dalai Lama when he was summoned to the Potala Palace and asked to make a film about ice skating, which Harrer had introduced to Tibet. Harrer built a cinema for him, with a projector run off a Jeep engine. Harrer soon became the Dalai Lama's tutor in English, geography, and some science, and Harrer was astonished at how fast his pupil absorbed the Western world's knowledge. They shared the same birthday and a strong friendship developed between the two that would last the rest of Harrer's life.

In 1952, Harrer returned to Austria where he documented his experiences in the books Seven Years in Tibet (1952) and Lost Lhasa (1953). Seven Years in Tibet was translated into 53 languages, and was a bestseller in the United States in 1954, selling three million copies. The book was the basis of two films of the same title, the first in 1956 and the second in 1997, starring Brad Pitt in the role of Harrer.

In Seven Years in Tibet, Harrer wrote:

Wherever I live, I shall feel homesick for Tibet. I often think I can still hear the cries of wild geese and cranes and the beating of their wings as they fly over Lhasa in the clear, cold moonlight. My heartfelt wish is that my story may create some understanding for a people whose will to live in peace and freedom has won so little sympathy from an indifferent world.

== Later adventures ==
Following his return from Tibet, Harrer settled down in Kitzbühel, Austria, and later in Liechtenstein. He took part in a number of ethnographic and mountaineering expeditions to Alaska, the Andes, and the Mountains of the Moon in central Africa. In 1953 he explored the source of the Amazon River and made a first ascent of Ausangate (6384 m). In 1954, some with German-American Fred Beckey, Harrer made the first ascents of Mount Deborah (3,761 m, 12,339 ft), Mount Hunter (4,442 m, 14,573 ft), and Mount Drum (3661 m), all in Alaska. In 1957, he explored the Congo River with the former king Leopold III of Belgium.

In February 1962, he was the leader of the team of four climbers who made the first ascent of the Carstensz Pyramid (4,884 m, 16,024 ft; later named Puncak Jaya) on Papua, Indonesia (then Dutch New Guinea), the highest peak in Oceania and one of the Seven Summits. This and his pioneering expedition to reach the Neolithic stone axe quarries at Ya-Li-Me are recorded in his memoir I Come from the Stone Age.

In 1966, he met the Xingu Indians of Brazil's Mato Grosso. In 1972, Harrer crossed the island of Borneo. He also made expeditions to Nepal, French Guiana, Greenland, Sudan, India, Ladakh, Andaman Islands, Uganda, Kenya and Bhutan.

Harrer wrote more than 20 books about his adventures, some including photographs considered to be among the best records of traditional Tibetan culture.

== Private life ==
In December 1938, Harrer married Lotte Wegener (1920–1989), the daughter of Alfred Wegener, German polar researcher and originator of the theory of continental drift. Her father had died on a Greenland expedition when she was 10. Their son Peter Harrer was born in December 1939, three months after Harrer was arrested by the British. Their marriage was dissolved in 1943 while he was still in India. In 1953, he married Margaretha Truxa (divorce in 1958), and in 1962 he married Katharina (Carina) Haarhaus (1922–2014), who remained his wife until his death.

Harrer was an enthusiastic golfer, winning Austrian national championships in 1958 and 1970.

== Final years ==
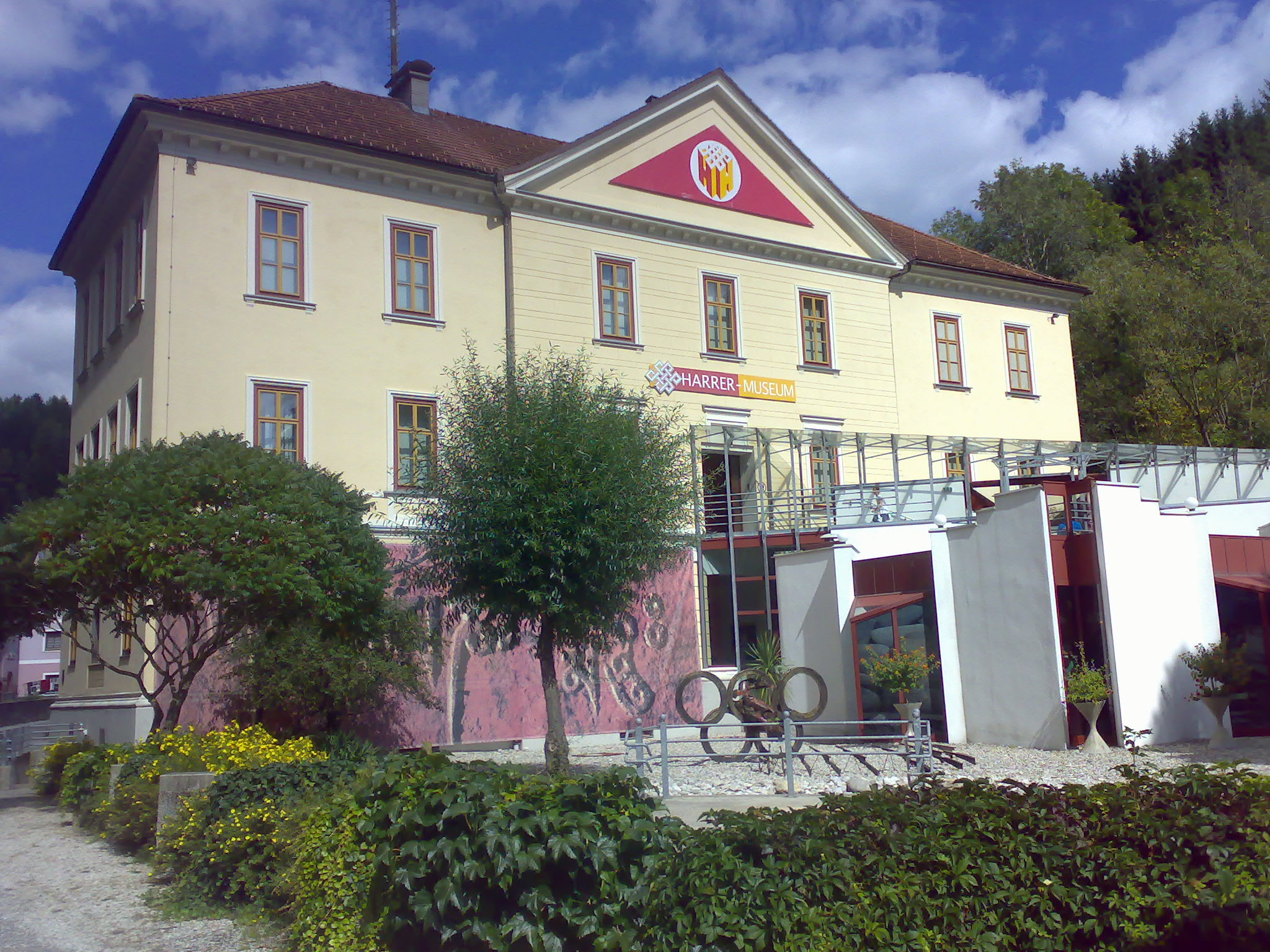
The Heinrich Harrer Museum in Hüttenberg, Austria

In the early 1980s, he visited Tibet again, and wrote a sequel to Seven Years in Tibet, titled Return to Tibet: Tibet After the Chinese Occupation. The Kirkus Review of his sequel said:

In 1982 he was able to revisit Tibet during the 'Chinese-staged thaw,' and he was by turns heartbroken and inspired by what be observed: Valuable cultural treasures had been destroyed by the invaders, and stories of concentration camps, forced labor, and political murders sent him reeling. Yet the country's religion was still strong, and there continued both armed resistance to the Chinese and an unquashable national will.

He later wrote his autobiography published in English as Beyond Seven Years in Tibet in 2007. He made approximately 40 documentary films and founded the Heinrich Harrer Museum in Hüttenberg, Austria dedicated to Tibet. In October 2002, the Dalai Lama presented Harrer with the International Campaign for Tibet's Light of Truth Award for his efforts to bring the situation in Tibet to international attention. Harrer died on 7 January 2006 in Friesach, Austria at the age of 93.

== Honours and awards ==
- 1978: Honorary Medal in Gold of the city of Vienna
- 1980: Gold Medal of the city of Graz
- 1982: Austrian Cross of Honour for Science and Art, 1st class
- 1982: Grand Merit Cross of the Order of Merit of the Federal Republic of Germany
- 1985: Golden Humboldt Medal (Germany)
- 2002: Light of Truth Award (International Campaign for Tibet)

== Publications ==
- Seven Years in Tibet (1952)
- Lost Lhasa (1953)
- The White Spider: The Classic Account of the Ascent of the Eiger (1959)
- Tibet is My Country. (1961) – an autobiography of the Dalai Lama's older brother, Thubten Jigme Norbu, as told to Harrer
- I Come from the Stone Age (1965)
- Ladakh: Gods and Mortals Behind the Himalayas. 1980. (1980)
- Return to Tibet (1985)
- Return to Tibet: Tibet After the Chinese Occupation (1998)
- Denk ich an Bhutan (2005)
- Beyond Seven Years in Tibet: My Life Before, During, and After (2007)
