= Anderl Heckmair =

German mountaineer

Andreas Heckmair
- Born: 12 October 1906; Munich, Germany
- Died: 1 February 2005 (aged 98); Oberstdorf, Germany
- Occupations: Mountain climber, guide
- Known for: Eiger north face first ascent

Andreas "Anderl" Heckmair (12 October 1906 – 1 February 2005) was a German mountain climber and guide who led the first successful ascent of the Eiger north face in July 1938.

== Eiger first ascent ==
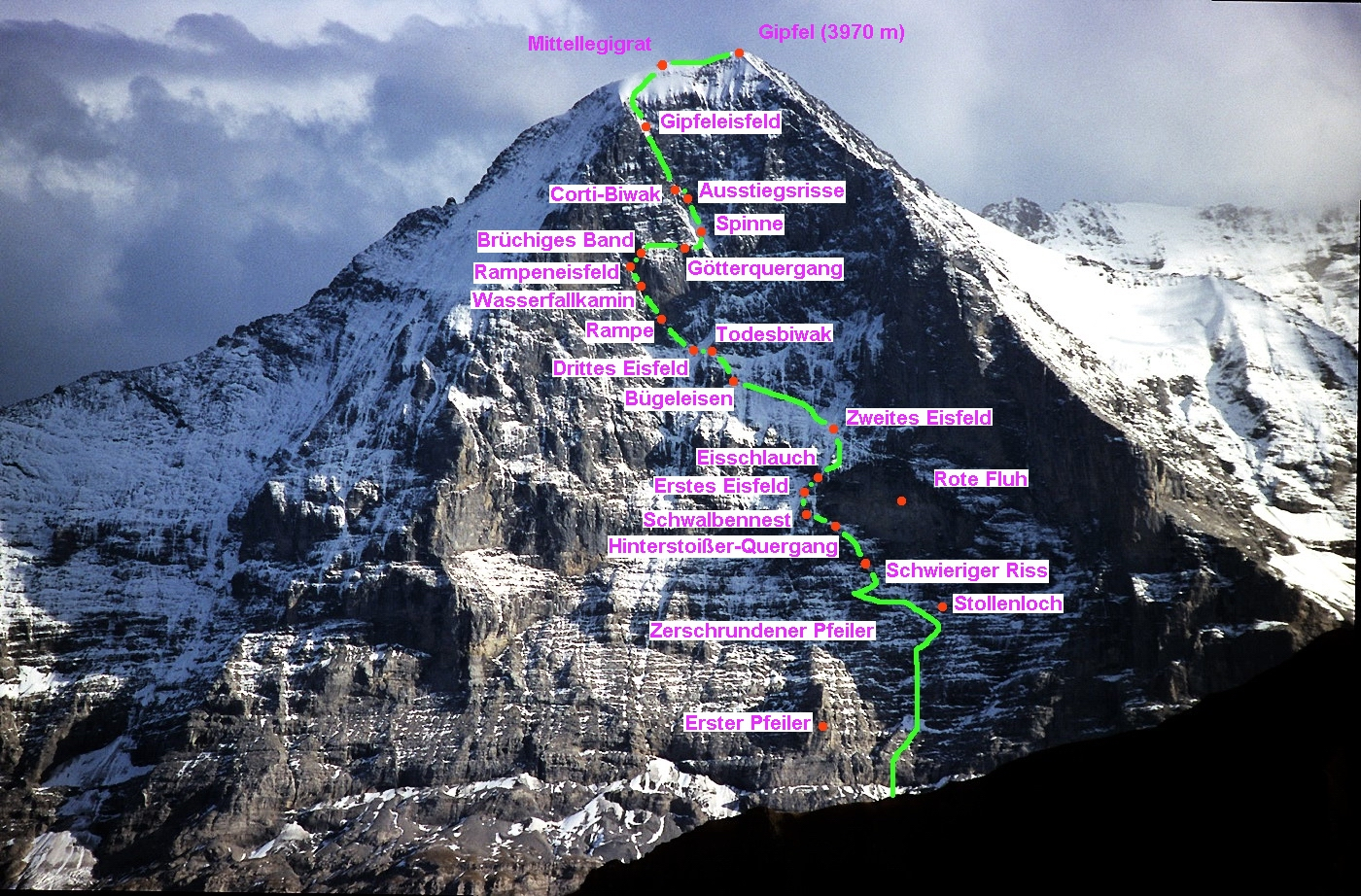
Heckmair-Route on Eiger

The most experienced mountaineer in a group consisting of himself, Ludwig Vörg, Heinrich Harrer and Fritz Kasparek, Heckmair led the most difficult pitches in the ascent, aided by the extensive kit (including new 12-point crampons) that he and Vörg had purchased using sponsors' money. He ran into several problems on the North Face of the Eiger, including a slip while climbing out of the exit cracks. Ludwig Vörg caught him by his feet, piercing his hand on Heckmair's crampons as he did so.

The success brought Heckmair fame throughout the world, particularly in his native Germany. The reception included an audience with Adolf Hitler (whom Heckmair had met before after working with Leni Riefenstahl). Although the Nazis used his achievement for propaganda Anderl shunned the publicity and never joined the Nazi party. After serving on the Eastern Front in World War II, he worked as a mountain guide in his native Bavaria, and was one of the driving forces in the formation of a professional association for mountain guides.

In addition to the Eiger climb, Heckmair climbed new routes on the Grandes Jorasses and many other alpine mountains. He also participated in expeditions to the Andes and the Himalaya. He was also partially responsible for the development of the "two rope" climbing system. In 1934, he took part as a reserve of the DSV team (Franz Fischer, Gustav "Gustl" Müller, Matthias Wörndle) in the Trofeo Mezzalama ski mountaineering competition. Heckmair started one and a half hour after the teams as single runner and overtook all the competing teams.

== Personal life ==
Heckmair lived in Oberstdorf until his death.

== Literature ==
- Uli Auffermann: Was zählt ist das Erlebnis: Anderl Heckmair - Alpinist und Lebenskünstler; das Porträt des großen Bergführers und Erstbegehers der Eiger-Nordwand. (Vorwort von Martin Schließler). Semann Verlag, Bochum 2002, ISBN 3-00-008873-3.
- Uli Auffermann, Anderl Heckmair: Zum Glück geht’s bergwärts. (Vorwort von Harry Valérien). Tyrolia Verlag, Innsbruck 2005, ISBN 3-7022-2690-7.
- Anderl Heckmair: Eigernordwand, Grandes Jorasses und andere Abenteuer. (Vorwort von Reinhold Messner). AS Verlag, Zürich 1999, ISBN 3-905111-38-1.
- David Pagel: My Dinner with Anderl. In: Allen Steck, Steve Roper: Ascent. AAC Press, Golden, CO, 1999, ISBN 0-930410-80-7, S. 13–26.
