= Ludwig Vörg =

German mountaineer

- Born: 19 October 1911; Munich, Germany
- Died: 22 June 1941 (aged 29); Soviet Union
- Cause of death: Killed in action
- Occupation: Mountaineer

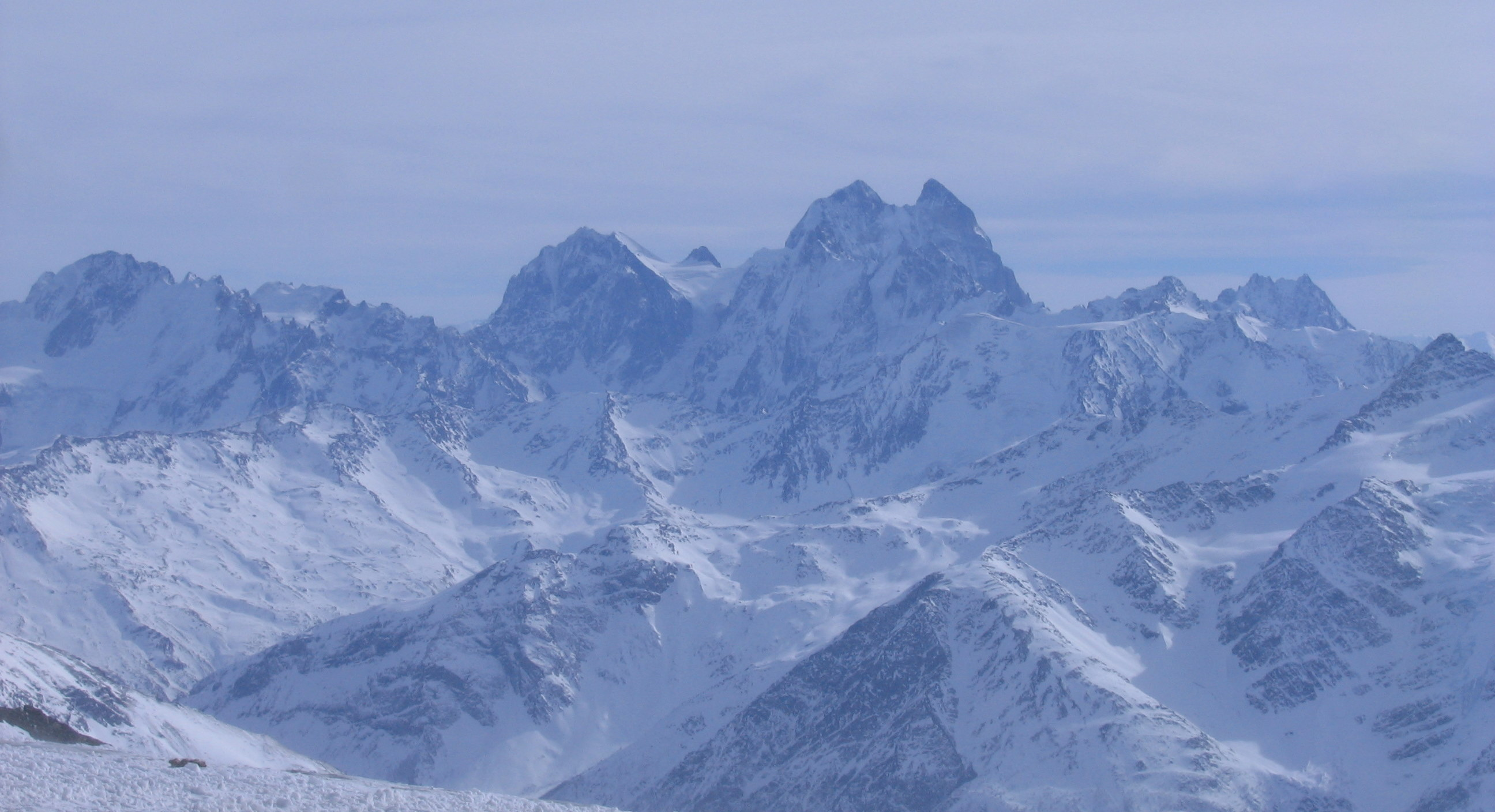
Mt. Ushba as seen from the slopes of Mt. Elbrus in winter.

Ludwig 'Wiggerl' Vörg (19 October 1911 – 22 June 1941) was a notable German mountaineer. With Heinrich Harrer, Fritz Kasparek, and Anderl Heckmair, he successfully climbed the north face of the Eiger in 1938, which was regarded as unclimbable at the time. He also made the first ascent of the West Face of Ushba in the Caucasus. Vörg was killed in action on the first day of Operation Barbarossa, Nazi Germany's invasion of the Soviet Union on 22 June 1941.

== The 'Bivouac King' ==
Prior to attempting to climb the north face of the Eiger, Vörg had been the first person to climb the west face of Ushba in the Caucasus. It was during this climb on the 2133 m high ice face that Vörg earned his nickname from his fellow climbers.

== 1937 on the Eiger ==
Vörg and Matthias Rebitsch were planning an attempt of the North Face in 1937 when news came that two Austrian climbers, Franz Primas and Bertl Gollackner, were stuck high on the North East face in ferocious conditions. Vörg and Rebitsch immediately began their climb up the Lauper Wall, where they too were caught in the storm. The face was streaming with torrents of water, glazed rocks, and avalanches. They were forced to bivouac high on the face on a tiny perch of rock. In the morning they pushed on to the hut on the Mittellegi Ridge, taking a break to dry their clothes and rest. Late in the afternoon, two guides reported to the hut that they had brought a freezing exhausted Primas down from the ridge, but that Gollackner was dead 152 m below the summit. They volunteered to recover the body, and carried it down the knife edge of the Mittellegi Ridge. Vörg and Rebitsch had put their own lives at risk for the sake of others; it was a trait in Vörg that would come out again the following year.

== Climbing the Eiger's North Face in 1938 ==
Vörg was attempting the Eiger with Anderl Heckmair. They had set off in pursuit of the preceding team in a race to the top. When they caught up with the Austrian team of Heinrich Harrer and Fritz Kasparek (Vörg and Heckmair's superior 12-point crampons were more useful on the Eiger; Harrer didn't have any crampons at all) they decided to proceed as a four. When they reached the 'Spider' icefield high on the face, they were hit by a ferocious storm, avalanches pounding down upon them. Heckmair describes what happened when he slipped from the face.

I bore straight down on him in a lightning swift slide. Wiggerl let the rope drop and caught me with his hands, and one of the points of my crampons went through his palm. The force with which I came down on Wiggerl knocked him out of his holds, but he, too, had been able to save himself and there we were, standing about 1 meter below our stance on steep ice without any footholds.

Our Friends...hadn't even noticed anything had happened. If we hadn't checked our fall we would have hurled them out from the face with us in a wide arc.

Vörg, it seems, saved the whole party from certain death, and without his bravery there would never have been the legendary tales of Heinrich Harrer. The four went on to reach the summit, and glory, on 24 July 1938. The pictures of Vörg taken at the end of July at the Breslau Deutsches Turn- und Sportfest 1938 taken a couple of days later show injury to his arm when the 4 climbers are with the minister of sport as well the most notorious third Reich figures. These are the same pictures that Harrer denied in certain editions of White Spider but caused him to change his story 50 years later.

== Death ==
Vörg was a Gefreiter in the German Army and was killed in action on the first day of Operation Barbarossa on 22 June 1941 in Siolo on the Russian front. He is registered in the memorial book at the German graveyard in Przemyśl, Poland.
