= Crampon =

Traction device for ice-climbing

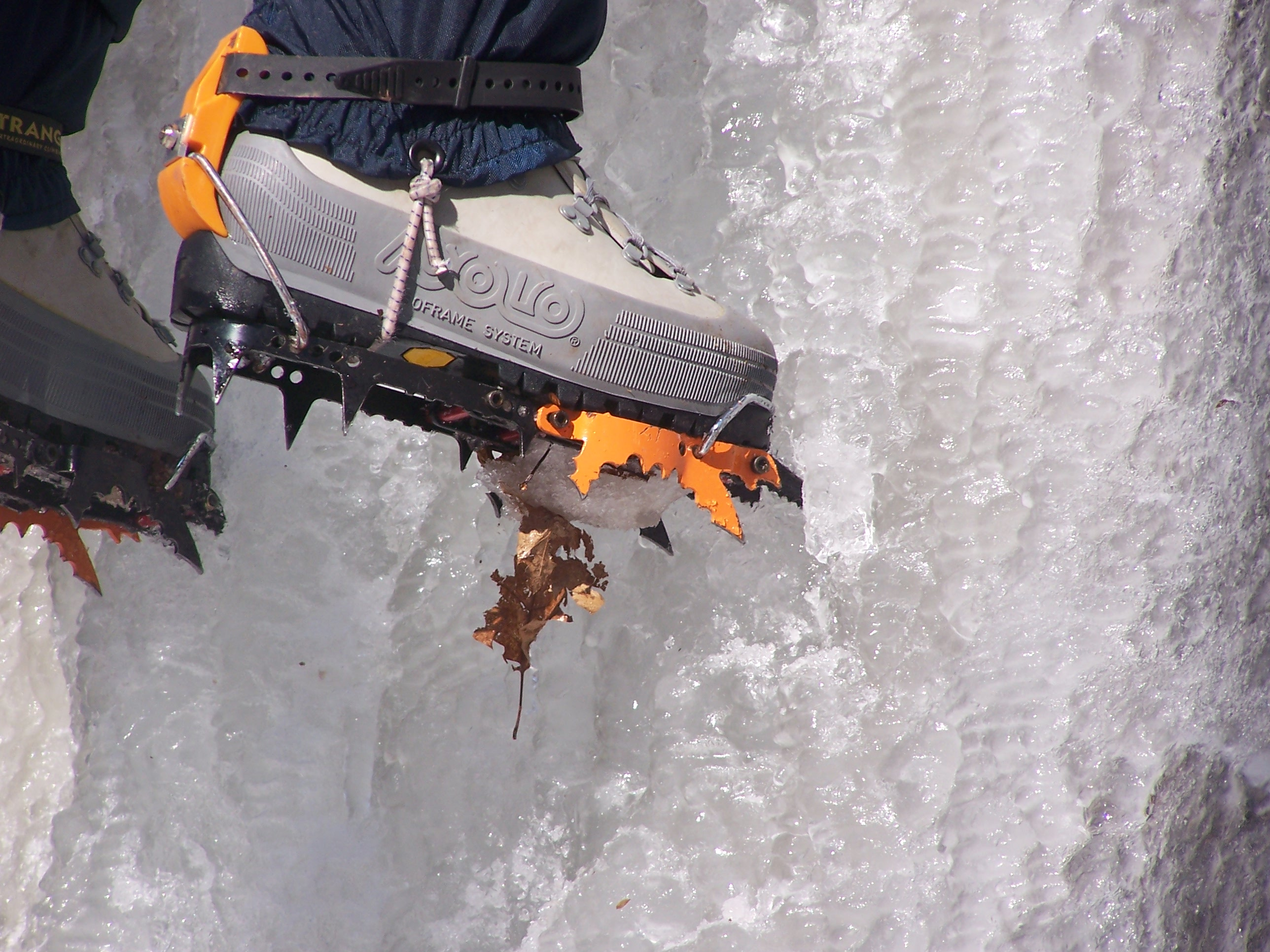
Rigid step-in (fully automatic) "front-point" crampons used for vertical ice climbing

A crampon is a traction device attached to footwear to improve mobility on snow and ice during ice climbing. Besides ice climbing, crampons are also used for secure travel on snow and ice, such as crossing glaciers, snowfields and icefields, ascending snow slopes, and scaling ice-covered rock.

There are three main attachment systems: step-in, hybrid, and strap bindings. The first two require boots with welts, or specialized mountaineering boots with dedicated front and rear lugs, as a cam-action lever attaches the crampon to the heel. The last type (strap bindings) is more versatile and can adapt to virtually any boot or shoe, but often does not fit as precisely as the other two types.

Oscar Eckenstein designed the first 10-point crampon in 1908, dramatically reducing the need for step cutting. This design was then made commercially available by the Italian Grivel.

== Characteristics ==
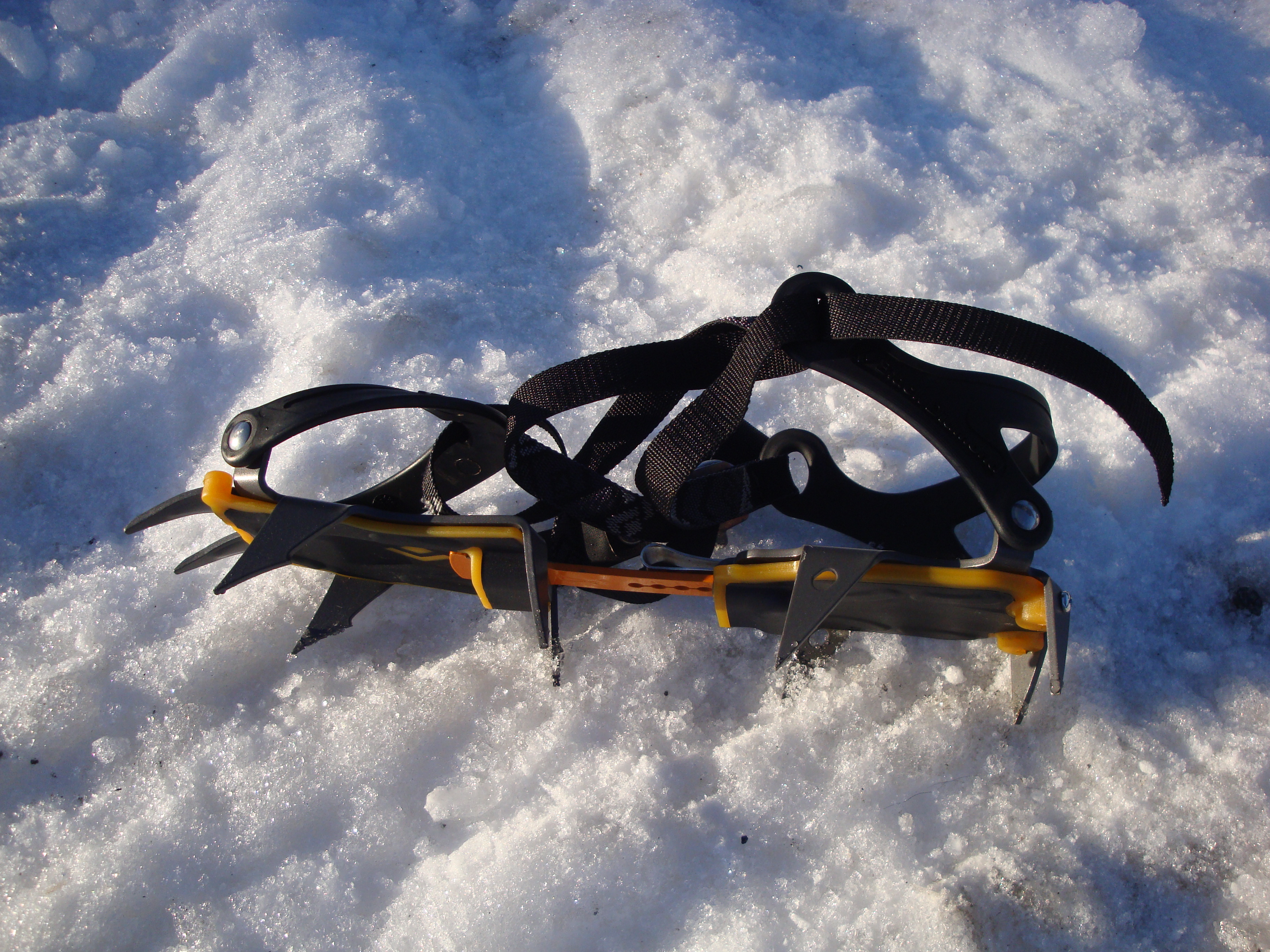
Yellow/grey plastic "anti-balling" plates prevent snow from building up

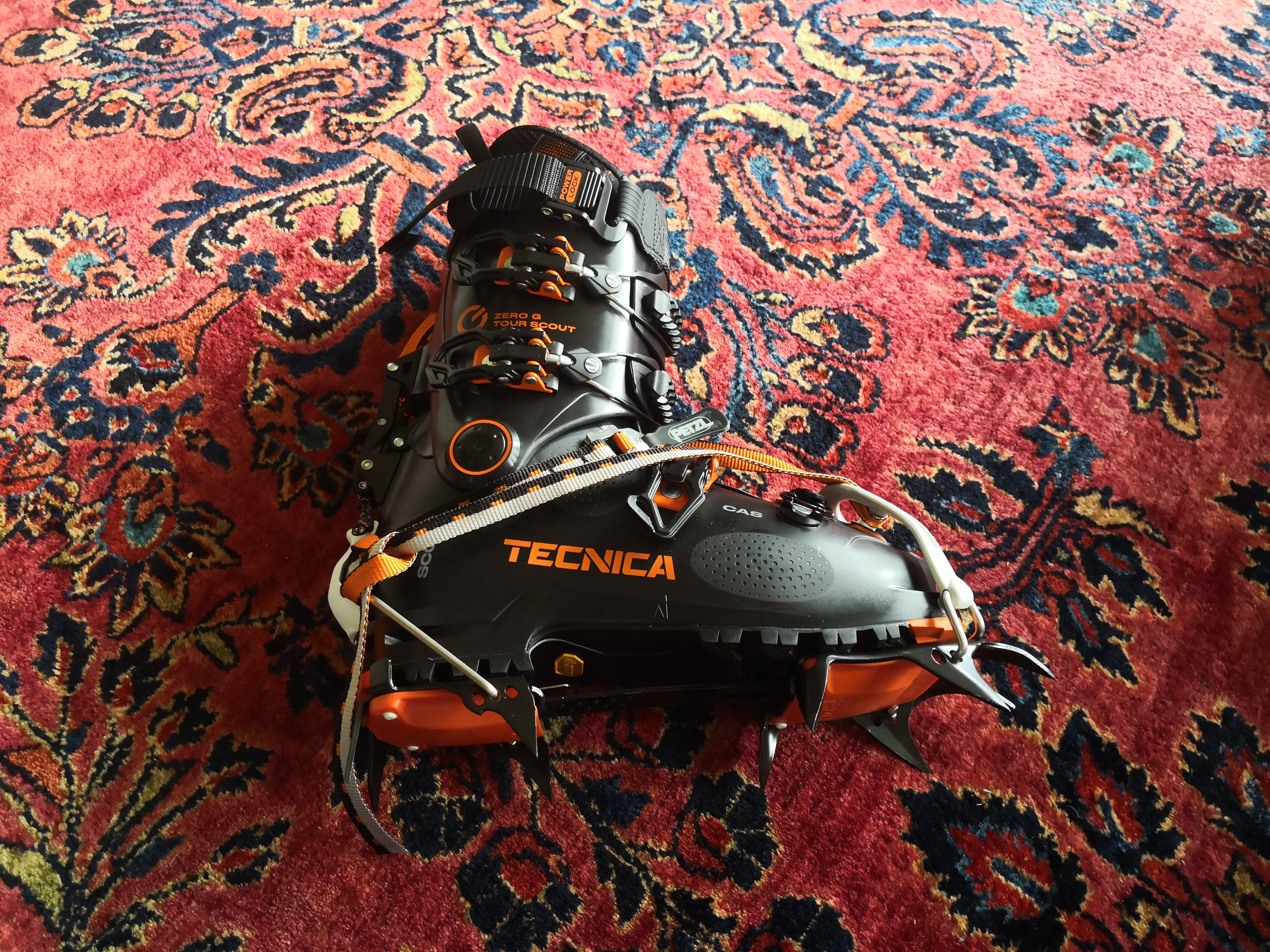
Alpine touring ski boot with a Petzl Irvis 10-point hybrid crampon

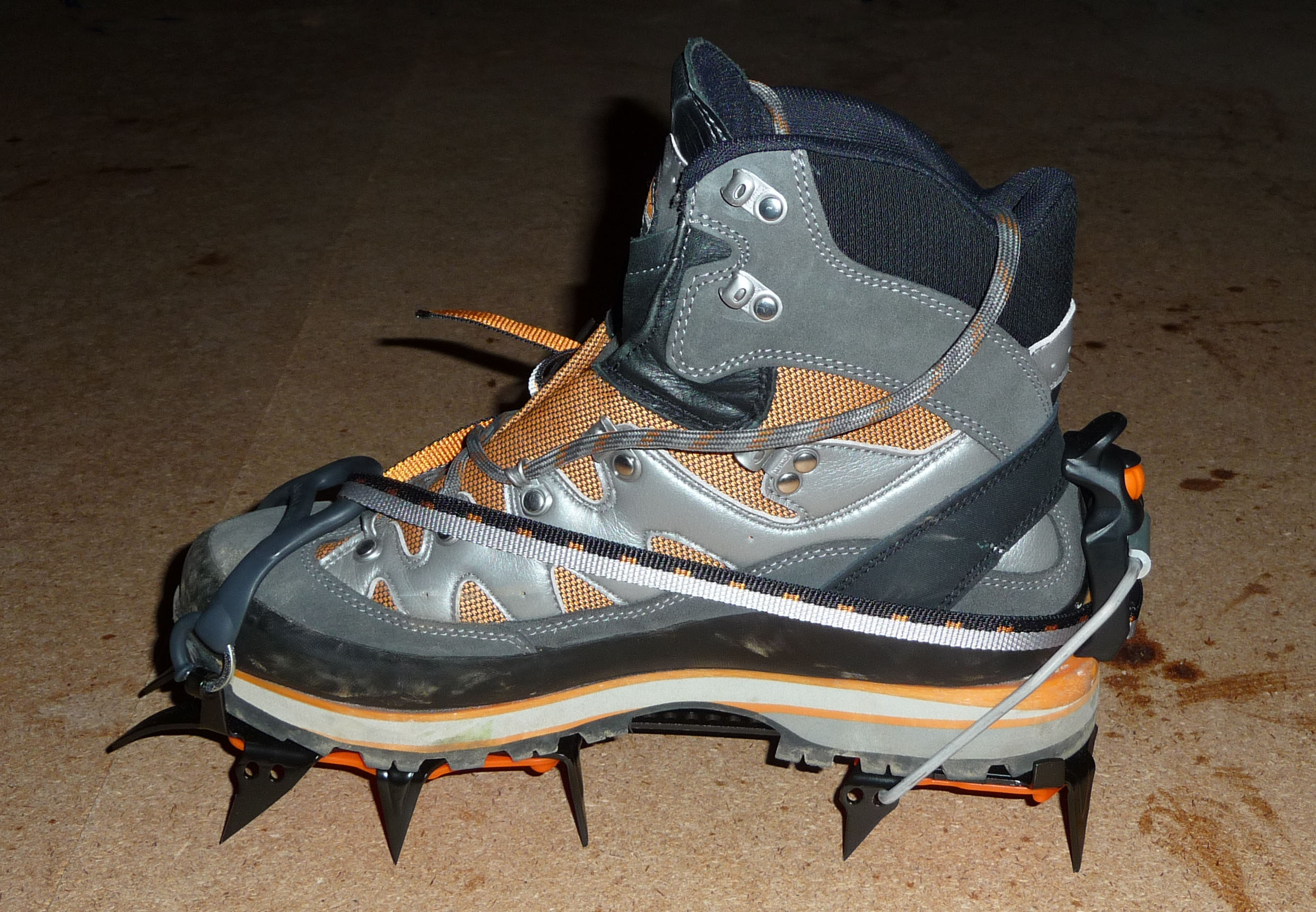
A mountaineering boot equipped with a traditional 12-point glacier/trekking crampon

=== Materials ===
Crampons are made of steel alloy, lightweight aluminum, or a combination of the two. Lighter weight crampons are popular for alpine ski touring where physical demands are generally lower and weight is at a premium.

=== Points ===
Early 10-point crampons lacked forward-angled spikes and thus required step cutting on steep terrain. The addition of two extra forward-slanting points to the front of the 10-point crampons was made in 1932 by Laurent Grivel, the son of Henry Grivel. That innovation created a system which was exceptional for mountaineering and glacier travel and which led to a revolution in front pointing. There is currently a range of models, including specialized crampons with as many as 14 points and models with single points for ice climbing.

=== Attachment ===
Crampons are fastened to footwear by means of a binding system. Improved attachment systems – such as a cam action "step-in" system similar to a ski binding and particularly well adapted to plastic technical mountaineering boots - have widely increased crampon use. Crampons also use a full "strap-in" system and a "hybrid" binding that features a toe strap at the front and a heel lever at the back.

=== Anti-balling ===
To prevent snow from balling up under crampons, especially in temperatures around freezing, most models can be fitted with plastic or rubber "anti-balling" systems to reduce build-up. Rubber models use flexion to repel snow while plastic anti-balling plates employ a hydrophobic surface to prevent adhesion.

=== Grades ===
Crampons are graded C1, C2 and C3 relative to their flexibility and general compatibility with different styles of boots. No crampons are suitable for B0 boots (flexible walking boots).

Crampon / boot compatibility
Type	Use	B0 boot (flexible)	B1 boot (semi stiff)	B2 boot (fully stiff)	B3 boot (technical climbing boot)
C1	relatively flexible - for walking	No	Yes	Yes	Yes
C2	versatile - for both walking and technical mountaineering	No	No	Yes	Yes
C3	for technical mountaineering	No	No	No	Yes

== Ski crampons ==
Specialized "ski crampons" are employed in ski mountaineering on hard snow and ice. Far more common in the Alps than in the United States, these ski crampons are known by their European names: Harscheisen (German), couteaux (French) and coltelli (Italian), literally French and Italian for "knives" in those languages.

== Microspikes ==
While crampons generally have a solid frame, and large spikes, and may only be attached to a mountaineering boot, stretch-on traction devices — often referred to as "microspikes" — typically consist of flexible rubber or metal chains with more, smaller spikes. Since crampons are tighter and have larger spikes, they are typically used for mountaineering on steep and dense snow or glacial ice in order to maintain strong traction and avoid falls, whereas stretch-on traction devices may be attached to multiple types of shoes and are generally used for hiking on flatter surfaces such as snow and ice, or even gravel or dirt. The term "microspikes" is commonly used to describe this category of traction devices, although it is a registered trademark of Kahtoola for a specific product.

== Heel spurs ==
Heel spurs are a type of crampon that attaches to the back of the heel and allow mixed climbers to perform heel hooks. They are a source of controversy, however, with some regarding the use of heel spurs as being a form of aid climbing, and not free climbing.

== See also ==
- Ice cleats
- Cleats
