= Annapurna (book) =

1951 book by Maurice Herzog

- First edition
- Author: Maurice Herzog
- Genre: Non-fiction
- Publication date: 1951

Annapurna: First Conquest of an 8000-meter Peak (1951) is a book by French climber Maurice Herzog, leader of the 1950 French Annapurna expedition, the first expedition in history to summit and return from an 8000+ meter mountain, Annapurna in the Himalayas. It is considered a classic of mountaineering literature and perhaps the most influential climbing book ever written.

== Overview ==
The original text was written in French, first published in 1951, and has been translated to a number of languages. Nea Morin and Janet Adam Smith translated the book from French into English in 1952.

The expedition was the first to attain the summit of one of the eight-thousanders—peaks higher than 8,000 meters, all located in the Himalayan and Karakoram mountain ranges in Asia. Members of the expedition included Louis Lachenal, Gaston Rébuffat, and Lionel Terray, then regarded as some of the finest mountaineers in the world, now regarded as among the finest ever.

Although there had been earlier internationally famous Himalayan mountaineers, such as George Mallory in the 1920s, with the publication of Annapurna, Herzog became the first living mountaineering celebrity known to the general public.

The book, with its famous exhortation that "there are other Annapurnas in the lives of men" inspired a generation of climbers.

== Reception ==
The book has sold over 11 million copies, as of 2000, more than any other mountaineering title. Maurice Isserman in Fallen Giants (2010), a history of Himalayan climbing, consider Annapurna to be the "most successful [mountaineering] expedition book of all times". In the United States it was published as a Book-of-the-Month Club selection which increased its circulation and popularity. National Geographic in its list of all-time 100 greatest adventure and exploration books ranked Annapurna #6 out of 100, saying the book "conveys the essential spirit of climbing as no popular book had before and earns its place here as the most influential mountaineering book of all time."

== In other media ==
Annapurna served as an inspiration for W. E. Bowman's parody novel The Ascent of Rum Doodle (1956), which pokes gentle but pointed fun at Herzog's sometimes pompous writing style.

== Controversy over Herzog's account of the ascent ==
Some aspects of Herzog's account of the summit day have been called into question with the publication of other members’ accounts of the expedition, most significantly Gaston Rébuffat's biography and the posthumous publication, in 1996, of Lachenal’s contemporaneous journals. David Roberts' book True Summit: What Really Happened on the Legendary Ascent of Annapurna (2000) examines the controversy.
