= Marcel Ichac =

French mountain climber and film director (1906–1994)

- Born: Marcel Leon Ichac; 22 October 1906; Rueil-Malmaison, France
- Died: April 9, 1994 (aged 87); Ézanville, France
- Education: École nationale supérieure des arts décoratifs
- Occupations: journalist, film director, photographer, mountaineer
- Known for: documentary film
- Awards: Oscar for Best Short Subject (1963); Cannes Short Film Palme d'Or (1962), Prix Spécial (1952); Trento Festival Golden Gentian (1955)
- Website: www.marcel-ichac.fr

Marcel Ichac (22 October 1906 – 9 April 1994) was a French alpinist, explorer, photographer and film director. Born in Rueil-Malmaison, France, Ichac was one of the first people to introduce electronic music in cinema using the ondes Martenot instrument for Karakoram (1936) and released the first French short in CinemaScope, Nouveaux Horizons (1953). He also accompanied the French Alpine Club's 1950 expedition that climbed Annapurna led by Maurice Herzog, which included climbing luminaries Lionel Terray, Louis Lachenal and Gaston Rébuffat.

== Filmography ==
Ichac directed documentary films of French explorations during the years 1930–1950. Expeditions he accompanied and documented on film include:

- Karakoram, the first French expedition to the Karakoram (1936)
- The first documentary film in the world about the Pilgrimage to Mecca (1940).
- A l'Assaut des Aiguilles du Diable (1942).
- Expeditions of Jacques-Yves Cousteau to the Mediterranean Sea (1948), the Red Sea (1955 : preparatory to the realization of The Silent World), and Lake Titicaca (1968).
- French Polar Expedition in Greenland with Paul-Emile Victor (1949).
- Victoire sur l'Annapurna, film on the 1950 French Annapurna expedition, with the first 8000m summit being reached by Maurice Herzog and Louis Lachenal.
- Les Etoiles de Midi (1959). Entered into the 9th Berlin International Film Festival.
- Le Conquérent de l'inutile (1967), a film he made about the life of his friend and mountain climber Lionel Terray.

Additionally, Ichac captured images of mountain warfare in World War II and the liberation of Turin, Italy in Tempête sur les Alpes (1944-1945).

== Bibliography ==
- A l'assaut des Aiguilles du Diable (1945)
- Regards vers l'Annapurna (1951)
- Quand brillent les Etoiles de Midi (1960)

== Awards ==
- Silver Lion in the Venice film festival for Karakoram.
- Directed winner of the Prix du documentaire at Cannes Film Festival in 1952.
- Produced An Occurrence at Owl Creek Bridge which won an Academy Award for Live Action Short Film.
