= 1950 French Annapurna expedition =

First ascent by Maurice Herzog and Louis Lachenal

Coordinates: 28°35′43″N 83°49′32″E

Paris Match dated 19 August 1950

The 1950 French Annapurna expedition, led by Maurice Herzog, reached the summit of Annapurna I at 8,091 metres (26,545 ft), the highest peak in the Annapurna Massif. The mountain is in Nepal and the government had given permission for the expedition, the first time it had permitted mountaineering in over a century. After failing to climb Dhaulagiri I at 8,167 metres (26,795 ft), the higher peak nearby to the west, the team attempted Annapurna with Herzog and Louis Lachenal, reaching the summit on 3 June 1950. It was only with considerable help from their team that they were able to return alive, though with severe injuries following frostbite.

Annapurna became the highest mountain to have been ascended to its summit, exceeding that achieved by the 1936 expedition to Nanda Devi, and the mountain was the first eight-thousander to be climbed. The feat was a great achievement for French mountaineering and caught the public imagination with front-page coverage in a best-selling issue of Paris Match. Herzog wrote a best-selling book Annapurna full of vivid descriptions of heroic endeavour and anguished suffering – but which much later was criticised for being too self-serving.

== Background ==
=== Himalayan mountaineering after World War II ===
Annapurna is in the Eastern Himalaya in Nepal, and no one had attempted to climb the mountain before 1950. All pre–World War II Himalayan mountaineering expeditions had avoided Nepal and had travelled via Tibet or India, but in 1949, alarmed that the communists seemed to be gaining control in China, Tibet expelled all Chinese officials and closed its borders to foreigners. In October 1950 Tibet was occupied by the People's Republic of China and its borders remained closed indefinitely.

For over one hundred years Nepal, ruled by the Rana dynasty, had not allowed explorers or mountaineers into the country. However, by 1946 a possible communist-sponsored revolution was even less welcome than Western influence so Nepal opened diplomatic discussions with the United States. Privately hoping to be able to use Nepal as a Cold War launching point for missiles, the United States welcomed the new situation. (Note: According to Isserman & Weaver (2008) "Nepal's first gesture of a new openness to Western contact was made to the United States. The American chargé d'affaires in New Delhi, George R. Merrell, traveled to Kathmandu in 1946 to discuss the establishment of formal diplomatic relations between the United States and Nepal, initiated on a limited basis the following year. Chargé d'affaires Merrell was convinced that the Himalaya was a region of vital strategic importance to the United States in the emerging cold war with the Soviet Union and allied Communist nations; in a cable to Washington in January 1947 he argued that 'in an age of rocket warfare,' Tibet might provide a valuable launching pad for American missiles. He may have harbored similar thoughts regarding Nepal; in any case, he worked diligently to broaden contacts between the two countries on both the official and informal levels.) Scientific expeditions became permitted but two requests in 1948 from Switzerland and Britain for purely mountaineering expeditions were refused. A year later mountaineers were allowed if they were accompanying scientific travellers. Nepal first gave permission for a full mountaineering expedition for a French attempt in 1950 on Dhaulagiri or Annapurna.

=== French mountaineering ===
Alpine mountaineering was immensely popular in France – the Fédération Française des clubs alpins et de montagne had 31,000 members in 1950 – and the top mountaineers were second only to footballers in their celebrity. Although French mountaineers included some of the leading alpinists in the world, (Note: According to Shipton who was distinguishing rock climbing alpinists from Himalayan mountaineers and explorers.) they had not ventured much beyond the Alps (Note: However a French team, including Ichac, had attempted Gasherbrum I in 1936.) whereas their British counterparts, with little truly mountainous terrain of their own and less skill on rock faces, had been reconnoitring Himalaya via newly-independent India. After the travails of war a mountaineering success would be good for the public mood.

== Planning the expedition ==
In 1949 the French Alpine Club requested permission from the Nepalese government to carry out a major expedition. The timing turned out to be ideal, and they were given permission to attempt to climb either Dhaulagiri or Annapurna in remote northwestern Nepal. The two mountain ranges, each consisting of many high peaks, are on each side of the great Kali Gandaki Gorge – Dhaulagiri I and Annapurna I, the highest in each range, are over 8,000 metres (26,000 ft) and there had been no previous attempts to climb these mountains. (Note: This article refers to the two highest peaks simply as "Dhaulagiri" and "Annapurna" rather than "Dhaulagiri I" and "Annapurna I". None of the other peaks were attempted.) The region had only been casually explored previously and the mountain heights had been determined by surveyors with precision theodolites positioned far away in India. Other nations felt that they should have been given priority but Nepal had favoured France. In Britain there had been the hope that international rivalry would cease after the war but this was not the view of the French government (who were providing one third of the resources) or of the banking and industrial sponsors, so the enterprise was to be strictly French.

Lucien Devies, the most influential person in French mountaineering, (Note: At the time Devies was president of Club alpin français, Fédération française de la montagne et de l'escalade and Groupe de haute montagne.) was responsible for gathering together a team and he chose Maurice Herzog, an experienced amateur climber, to be the leader of the expedition. (Note: According to Roberts there may have been a class prejudice in choosing the leader – an amateur mountaineer was to be preferred over a professional guide.) Accompanying him were to be three younger Chamonix professional mountain guides, Louis Lachenal, Lionel Terray and Gaston Rébuffat, and two amateurs Jean Couzy and Marcel Schatz. The expedition's doctor was Jacques Oudot and the interpreter and transport officer Francis de Noyelle, a diplomat. The only person who had previously been to the Himalaya was Marcel Ichac who was the expedition's photographer and cinematographer. (Note: Herzog listed the sherpas: Ang Tharkay (sirdar), Dawathondup, Angtsering, Sarki, Foutharkay, Aila, Angdawa and Ajeepa.) The three mountain guides would have preferred an international approach whereas Herzog welcomed climbing for national prestige. None were paid, not even the professional guides. The Maharajah of Nepal appointed G.B. Rana to accompany the expedition for local liaison, translation and general organisation.

Two days before the expedition departed, Devies gathered the French team together and required them to swear an oath that they would obey their leader in everything.

== Embarking on expedition and reconnaissance ==
=== Departure and march-in ===
On 30 March 1950 the French Annapurna Expedition (Note: It was more formally known as the "French Himalayan Expedition 1950" (L'expédition himalayenne française de 1950).) flew on an Air France DC-4 from Paris to New Delhi (with several refuelling stops). They took 3.5 tons of supplies which included ropes and outer clothing of nylon, down-filled jackets and felt-lined leather boots with rubber soles – all innovative equipment. Most of their food was to be bought locally and they had decided not to take bottled oxygen. Another aircraft took them to Lucknow where they met Ang Tharkay, the expedition's highly experienced sirdar (Note: The sirdar is in charge of the sherpas. Sherpas assist the climbers on the mountain.) A train took them to Nautanwa where they met up with the other sherpas and entered Nepal to travel on by truck through jungle and then grassy fields to Butwal where the road ended. On the march-in Lachenal and Terray would keep going on ahead as a scouting party while the rest followed with 150 porters carrying the supplies on their backs. Porters were paid according to the weight of their loads and they scorned the work they were being offered where the packs averaged about 40 kilograms (88 lb). However, they were willing to accept double loads of 80 kilograms (180 lb). Terray estimated the heaviest porter would not have had a body weight of over 80 kilograms.

=== Reconnaissance of region ===
Sketch map of Dhaulagiri and Annapurna region based on Herzog's 1951 map

Dhaulagiri and Annapurna are 34 kilometres (21 miles) apart on either side of the gorge of the Kali Gandaki river, a tributary of the Ganges. As the expedition approached from the south Dhaulagiri was clearly visible as a white pyramid to the west whereas Annapurna to the east was hidden behind the Nilgiri mountains. On first seeing Dhaulagiri on 17 April the immediate impression was that it was unclimbable. They could not see Annapurna but there was a break in the Nilgiris where the Miristi Kola flows into the Kali Gandaki through a deep and narrow gorge with an impenetrable entrance. The 1920s Survey of India map they were using (see left-hand Annapurna map below) showed a path leading up the gorge and over "Tilicho Pass" that might provide a route to the north face of Annapurna. However, none of the local inhabitants they spoke to knew of a path or had any further information. Continuing up the Kali Gandaki Gorge the team reached the market town of Tukusha at 2,600 metres (8,500 ft) on 21 April. The people lived there in primitive conditions – Terray described the place as having "biblical charm". (Note: Nepal did not have the abject poverty of parts of Delhi which Terray characterised as being like Auschwitz) Couzy climbed a 4,000-metre (13,000 ft) Nilgiri peak to the east of Tukusha to inspect the eastern Dhaulagiri terrain and he concluded the southeast ridge was "absolutely frightful". Even so, Herzog decided that they should first focus on Dhaulagiri, the higher mountain, since they would only have to investigate possible routes to the summit and would not have to reconnoitre to find the mountain itself.

=== Dhaulagiri exploration ===
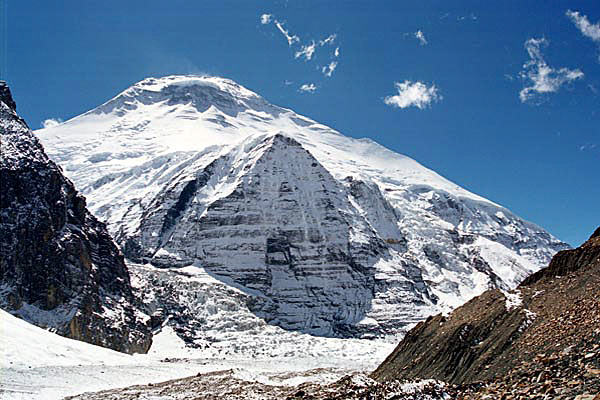
Dhaulagiri from French Pass (2008)

Dhaulagiri region: sketch maps of India Survey (left) and Herzog (right)

Starting from Tukusha, the climbers Lachenal and Rébuffat headed for an initial exploration of Dhaulagiri's eastern glacier, while Herzog, Terray and Ichac went to the north where they found their 1920s map was seriously defective (see above). Unlike Annapurna, Dhaulagiri is well separated from its neighbouring peaks and it is steep on all sides. They found an unmapped region they called the "Hidden Valley" but from there they were unable to see the mountain at all. Over the next two weeks small groups examined the southeast and northeast ridges while Terray and Oudot reached a 5,300-metre (17,500 ft) pass (called French Pass) beyond the Hidden Valley but, although they were able to see Dhaulagiri, they decided the north face could not be climbed. They were also able to see across to Annapurna in the distance where there were steep cliffs to the south but the northern profile did not look to be more than 35°.

=== Annapurna exploration ===
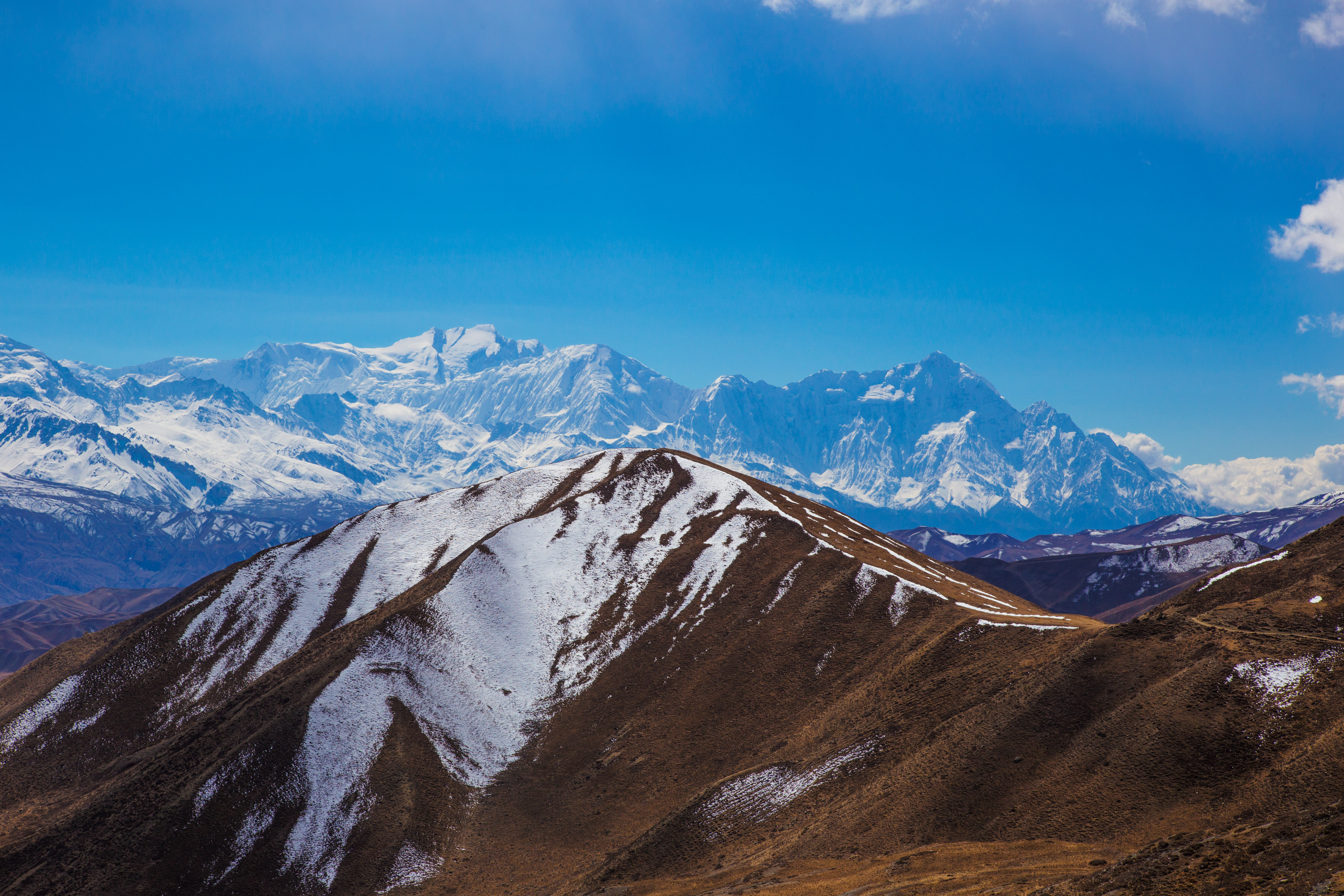
Annapurna Himal from 50 kilometres (31 mi) north. Annapurna I is the highest peak, somewhat left of centre (annotated image).

Annapurna region: sketch maps of India Survey (left) and Herzog (right)

During this Dhaulagiri reconnaissance, Schatz, Couzy, Oudot and Ang Tharkay had been back south to explore the deep canyon of the Miristi Kola river. When they had previously passed that river on the march-in it seemed to have a greater flow than would be likely for the limited drainage basin shown on the map. To avoid the entrance to the gorge, the party climbed to the ridge of the Nilgiris from where they could see the ravine below was indeed impassable. (Note: The pass over the Nilgiri ridge they called the "Pass of April 27th".) However, traversing beside the ridge by following a slight path marked with cairns, they reached a point from which Schatz and Couzy were able to descend 910 metres (3,000 ft) to the river and from there they reached the base of Annapurna's northwest spur. They could not tell whether the spur, or the ice fields on either side of it, might provide a feasible route to the summit.

With everyone back in Tukusha and with poor prospects of attaining either summit from the east, west or south, Herzog acted on the advice of a Buddhist lama that they should travel towards Muktinath on a route to the north and then east. Hoping they might be able to approach "Tilicho Pass" from the east along the track marked on their map, Rébuffat, Ichac and Herzog set off on 8 May crossing two passes north of a peak (now called Tilicho Peak) at each end of a frozen ice lake and discovering an unmapped wall of mountains to their south continuing beyond the lake and still blocking any view of Annapurna. This part of the Nilgiri range looping right round the north of Annapurna they called the "Great Barrier". Ichac and Ang Tharkay stayed back to do accurate surveying and to climb north to a point at about 6,200 metres (20,300 ft) on a ridge, hoping the see the mountain over the Great Barrier – but everywhere was shrouded in mist. The main party reached the village of Manangbhot and explored slightly further before returning to Tukucha on the road via Muktinath. The expedition had been unable even to see Annapurna from the north, let alone discover a route to it. The map they had was so inaccurate that it was useless.

With the start of the monsoon predicted for the first week in June, back in Tukusha on 14 May they held a meeting to discuss which mountain to attempt and along which particular route. Terray wrote: "In full awareness of his terrible responsibility Maurice chose the more reasonable but uncertain course: we would attempt Annapurna." The route would be the one reconnoitered by Schatz and Couzy's team.

== Approach to Annapurna and summit ==
=== Finding a location for base camp ===
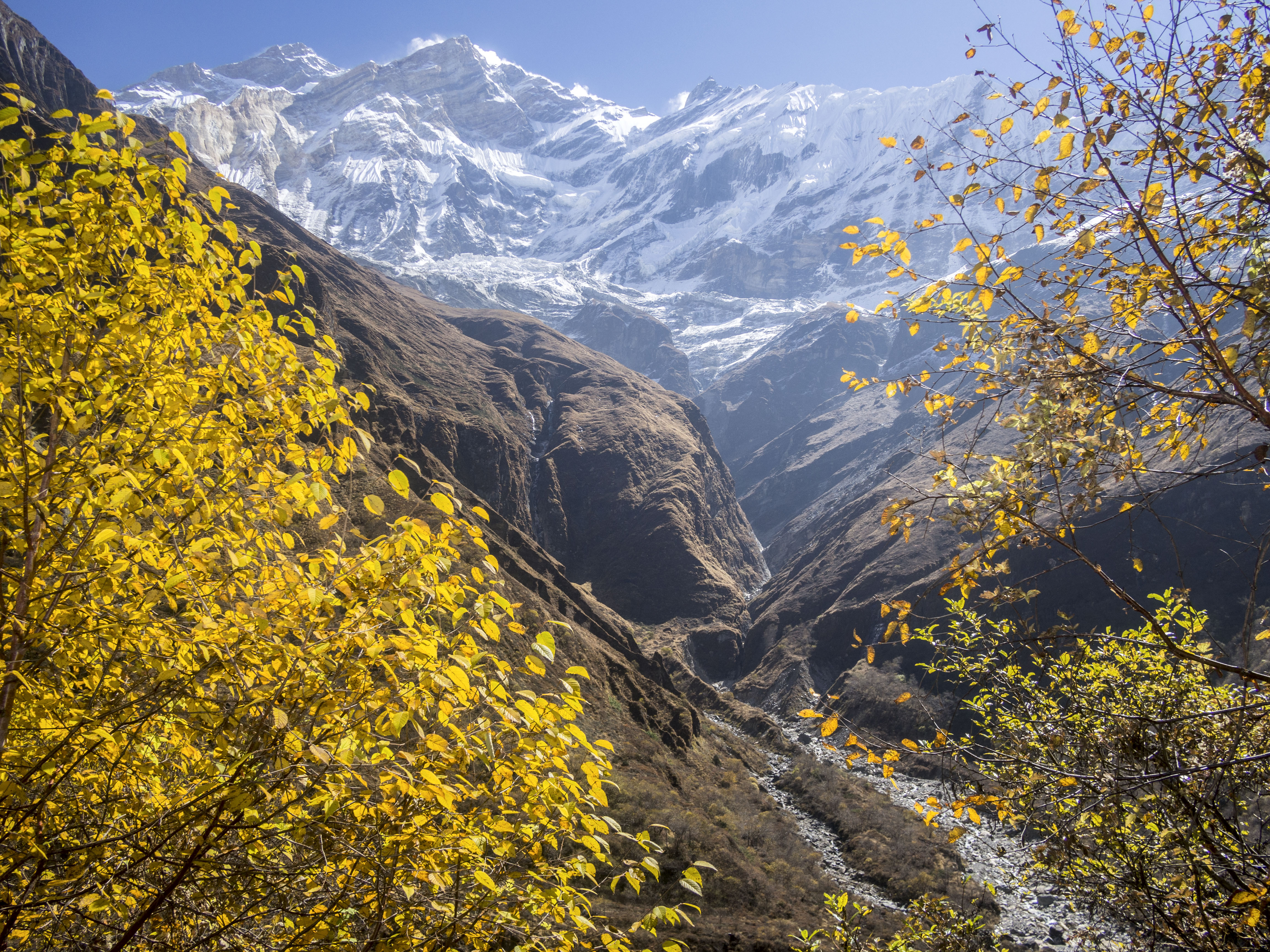
Annapurna from Miristi Kola valley

Most of the party set out for the Miristi Kola as an advance reconnaissance group leaving most of the porters to bring the rest of stores and equipment later. They took with them the medical supplies deemed necessary by Oudot including Maxiton (the equivalent amphetamine preparation in Britain was Benzedrine). In three separate groups they crossed the Nilgiri range, traversed east above the Miristi Kola, and descended the gorge. Crossing the river they set up a base camp at the foot of a glacier below Annapurna's northwest spur. Two teams moved up the spur, a feat of considerable technical climbing, (Note: Terray estimated four or five pitches of grade IV and one very exposed pitch of grade V (led by Lachenal). The grades used at that time eventually became the UIAA scale.) but even after repeated attempts over five days they were unable to get higher than about 6,000 metres (20,000 ft). (Note: Annapurna was first climbed by the northwest spur in 1996.)

Meantime Lachenal and Rébuffat on their own initiative had moved round the foot of the spur to below Annapurna's north face, to a point they decided gave the best prospects for success. They sent a note back to the main party saying there was a likely route up the side of the north face glacier leading to the plateau above. However, they could see no higher. Fortunately Terray and Herzog had been able to see the plateau from their high point on the northwest spur and could tell the route across the plateau to the top was not technically difficult. Compared with the northwest spur, the north face of Annapurna is at a relatively low angle and does not require rock climbing skills, but the risk of avalanches makes it extremely dangerous. Annapurna may well be the most dangerous 8,000-metre peak – as of 2000 for 38 successful ascents there had been 57 deaths.

=== Intermediate camps ===
The party moved their base camp to the furthest point that could be reached by porters in the direction of the newly identified starting point – to the right bank of the North Annapurna glacier at 4,400 metres (14,500 ft) (Note: The approximate heights of the various camps were: Base Camp 4,400 metres (14,500 ft); Camp I, 19/05/1950, 5,100 metres (16,700 ft), Camp II, 23/05/1950, 5,900 metres (19,350 ft), Camp III, 24/05/1950, 6,600 metres (21,650 ft), Camp IV, 27/05/1950, 7,200 metres (23,500 ft), Camp V, 31/05/1950, 7,500 metres (24,600 ft), Summit, 03/06/1950, 8,091 metres (26,545 ft).) while Couzy was left to organise moving the supplies up. Camp I was set up on the glacier at 5,110 metres (16,750 ft) with a relatively gentle slope up to the mountain but with a considerable risk of avalanches. From here on the first sunny afternoon in weeks they could survey the mountain easily. Herzog decided that the expedition's support should now move from Tukucha and so sent Sarki back with the order. Camp II was in the middle of a plateau above the north Annapurna glacier, fairly well sheltered from avalanches. Each morning brought 0.30 metres (1 ft) or more of snow – making for slow progress – but after crossing an avalanche corridor they were able to establish Camp III among some seracs on the far side of the glacier and by 28 May they had established Camp IV below a curving cliff of ice that they called the "Sickle". Terray was amazed by the energy he and the team showed, considering how long they had been at high altitude and how little they had eaten. He wondered if this was due to the drugs Oudot had insisted on them taking regularly. (Note: On the mountain the climbers were taking both sleeping pills and stimulants (Dextroamphetamine). The latter may have contributed to Herzog's euphoria on the summit and in the crevasse shelter.) On 25 May the porters arrived at Base Camp with supplies and equipment to support what would turn out to be a very fast, alpine-style assault on the mountain.

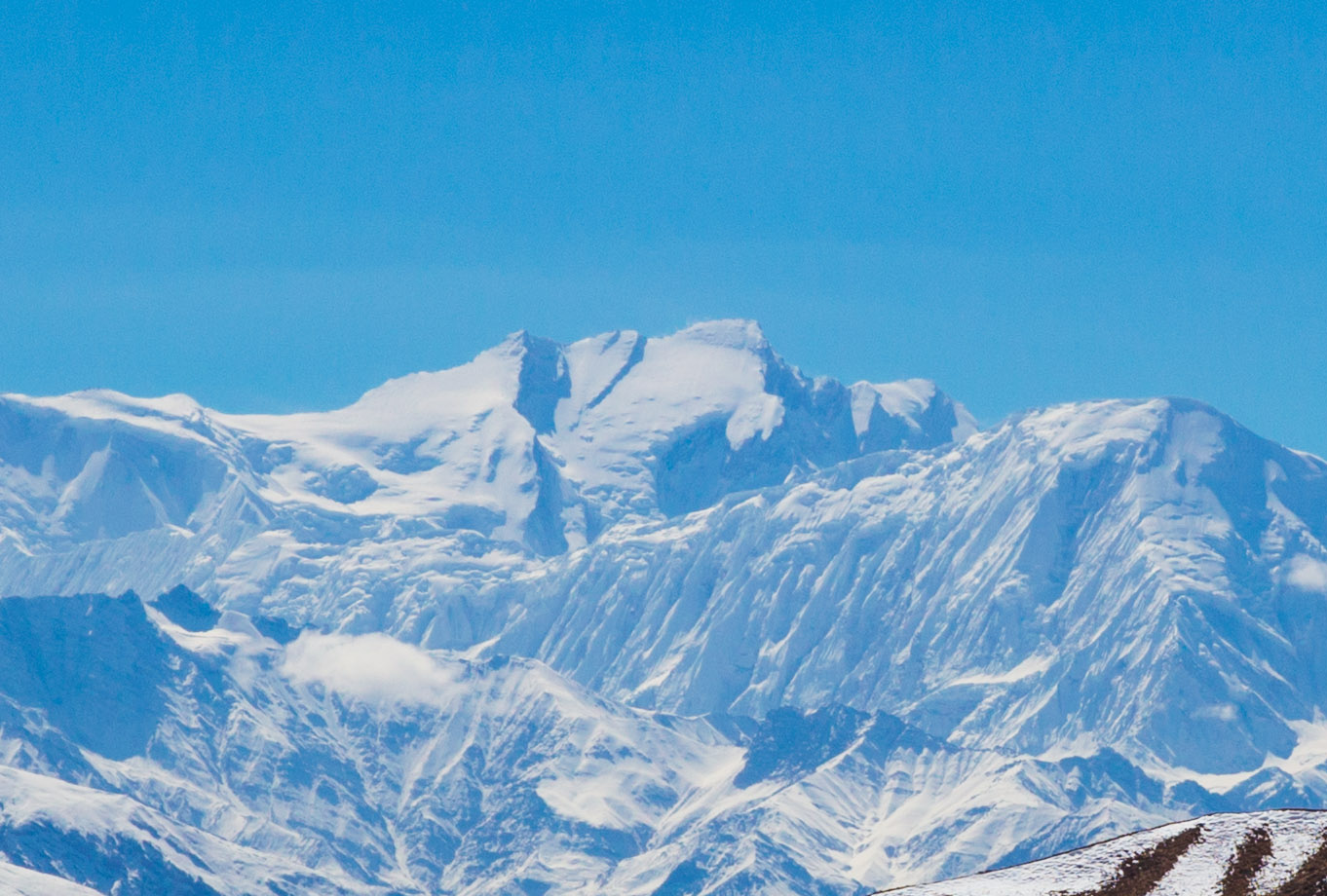
Annapurna's "Sickle" (centre). Shoulder of Tilicho Peak (right) obscures lower parts of Annapurna.

Herzog's plan had been that he and Terray should rest before attempting the summit but the other four climbers became too exhausted to do their part of a carry to Camp IV so Terray (disobeying the orders he had received to go down from Camp III to Camp II) climbed with Rébuffat and a team of sherpas to carry up these loads. This unselfish act by Terray led to Herzog (who had acclimatised the best) and Lachenal, accompanied by Ang Tharkay and Sarki, being the ones who set out from Camp II on 31 May for an attempt on the summit. Next day Herzog's team moved Camp IV to a better site at the top of the Sickle cliff (Camp IVA) and then on 2 June they climbed a gully through the Sickle to establish Camp V, their assault camp, on the snow fields above. With the monsoon now forecast for 5 June, time was extremely tight. Herzog offered Ang Tharkay and Sarki the opportunity to accompany them to the summit but they turned down what would have been a great honour. (Note: Ang Tharkay said "Thank you, very much, Bara Sahib, but my feet are beginning to freeze". This was wisdom, not cowardice, in the light of what was to happen. He was doing a professional job of work, not aiming for the glory of France.) The two sherpas headed back to Camp IVA.

=== Reaching the summit ===
Not understanding that being at high altitude without additional oxygen induces apathy, in a severe gale the climbers spent the night without eating anything or sleeping, and in the morning they did not bother lighting their stove to make hot drinks. At 06:00 it was no longer snowing and they ascended farther. Finding that their boots were proving to be inadequately insulated, Lachenal, fearing losing his feet to frostbite, contemplated going down. He asked Herzog what he would do if he did turn back and Herzog replied that he would go on up alone. Lachenal decided to continue on with Herzog. A last couloir led them to the summit which they reached at 14:00 on 3 June 1950. Herzog estimated the height as 8,075 metres (26,493 ft) – his altimeter read 8,500 metres (27,900 ft). They had climbed the highest summit ever reached, the first eight-thousander, on their first attempt on a mountain that had never before been explored. (Note: Annapurna was the only eight-thousander to be climbed at the first attempt.) Herzog, writing in his characteristically idealistic way, was ecstatic: "Never have I felt happiness like this, so intense and pure." On the other hand, Lachenal only felt "a painful sense of emptiness".

Lachenal was anxious to go down as soon as possible but he obliged Herzog by photographing his leader holding the Tricolour on the summit and then a pennant from Kléber, his sponsoring employer. (Note: Herzog raised the pennant of his employer Kléber-Colombe tyres, where he was a director (now part of Michelin).) After about an hour on the summit, not waiting for Herzog in his euphoric state to load another roll of film, Lachenal set off back down at a furious pace. Herzog, swallowing the last of his food – from a nearly empty tube of condensed milk – threw the tube down on the summit as that was the only memorial he could leave and he trailed behind Lachenal into a gathering storm.

== Descent to Base Camp ==
At some stage Herzog took his gloves off and laid them down to open his pack. Catastrophically they slid away down the mountain so he had to continue bare-handed, not thinking to use the spare socks he had with him. At Camp V he was met by Terray and Rébuffat who had brought up a second tent hoping to make their own summit attempt the next day (Note: This second summit attempt had not been planned in advance so it was extremely fortunate for Herzog and Lachenal that Terray and Rébuffat had decided to undertake it. Terray's book gives details of the attempt.) and who were horrified at the state of Herzog's frostbitten hands. Lachenal was missing but Herzog, unable to think clearly, said he would be arriving soon. Later they heard Lachenal calling for help – he had taken a long fall to below the camp, had lost his ice axe and a crampon, and his feet were seriously frostbitten. Terray scrambled down to him and he pleaded to be taken down to Camp II and medical help. At last Terray persuaded him to go back up to Camp V, the only responsible decision. Terray plied everyone with hot drinks through the night and whipped Lachenal's toes with the end of a rope for hours to try and restore the blood circulation – in the other tent Rébuffat did likewise for Herzog's fingers and toes. (Note: Even at the time whipping digits was becoming a dubious treatment and before long it was thought to be damaging. It now certain even vigorous rubbing, never mind whipping, causes more damage.)

Next morning Lachenal's feet would not fit into his boots so Terray gave him his larger ones and then slit the uppers of Lachenal's so he could wear them himself. Descending with the storm still raging they could not find Camp IVA anywhere and they were desperate to avoid a bivouac out in the open. While they were frantically trying to dig a snow hole Lachenal fell through some snow covering a crevasse. Fortunately, he landed in a snow cave that could provide some slight shelter for them all in the night though they had no food or water and only one sleeping bag. In the night snow poured in on them burying their boots and cameras. Next morning they took a long time to find their boots but their cameras, with the only photographs taken at the summit, could not be found. They climbed out of the crevasse but by now Terray and Rébuffat were snowblind so the pair crippled with frostbite led the blind pair slowly down until by extreme good fortune they were met by Schatz who guided them back down to Camp IVA.

Couzy was at the camp so he and Schatz were able to assist Herzog, Rébuffat and Lachenal down the Sickle cliff to Camp IV where there were some sherpas sheltering. Meanwhile, Terray had chosen to stay at IVA trying to get the blood circulation back into his feet. Schatz climbed back up to help him descend, also taking the opportunity to recover the still camera from the crevasse shelter – the cine camera he could not find. As the six climbers descended below Camp IV the air temperature rose rapidly and a crack appeared in the snow right under Herzog's roped group. An avalanche swept them down about 150 metres (500 ft) until their rope caught on a ridge. Herzog was left dangling upside down with his rope round his neck while his two sherpas were caught on their end of the rope. Descending further in agony Herzog was becoming reconciled to being close to death. Eventually they reached the comparative safety of Camp II. Herzog now felt he had succeeded as leader – even if he now died his companions would be safe and the mountain had been conquered.

At Camp II Oudot, the expedition's doctor, injected Herzog and Lachenal to help improve their blood flow. The injections in the arteries of legs and arms were excruciatingly painful and they needed to be repeated for many days afterwards. (Note: The first injections were of novocaine and on subsequent days acetylcholine was injected. These drugs are now known not to help frostbite.) On 7 June everyone started descending again with Herzog, Lachenal and Rébuffat lying on sledges. Needing to hurry before the monsoon made the Miristi Kola impassable through flooding, they reached Camp I as the sky clouded over and heavy rains started. From here, on 8 June, they wrote a telegram, announcing that Annapurna had been climbed, to be taken by a runner for sending to Devies in Paris. The route to Base Camp was over terrain unsuitable for sledges so Herzog and Lachenal were carried on the backs of sherpas. Once at base, and just at the right time, a large team of porters arrived to transport the whole expedition back to Lete on the Gandaki River.

== Leaving the mountain ==
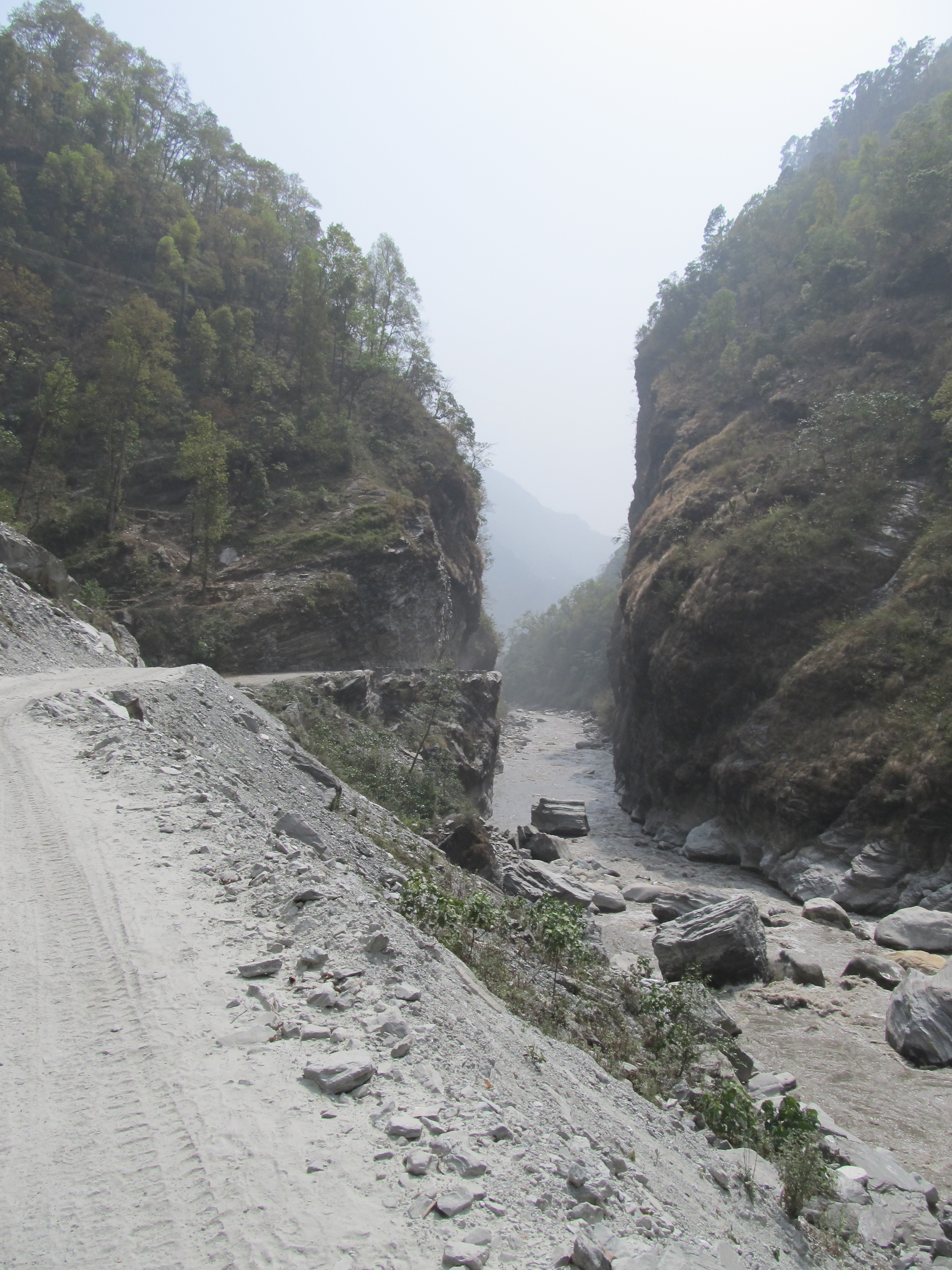
Kali Gandaki valley near confluence with Miristi Kola, at Tatopani. (road as in 2012).

Specially for the expedition, All India Radio broadcast a report that the monsoon would be reaching them the next day, 10 June. The heavy rain would become torrential and the rivers would rise. A team led by Schatz built a makeshift bridge over the Miristi Kola and everyone hurried towards the bridge along paths that required Lachenal to be carried in a human cacolet and Herzog in a wicker basket. They became stranded in the open when it became too dark to carry the casualties safely. Next morning they reached a camp by the bridge but the river had risen to only 0.30 metres (1 ft) below the span so they needed to undertake the difficult crossing immediately. Everyone got across and camped for the night – by morning the bridge had been swept away. They had hoped to follow the river down to where it joined the Kali Gandaki but a reconnaissance showed this would be impossible and so they were forced to climb the Nilgiri ridge to return the way they had come. Now down in the jungle, Herzog developed a fever and reached a very low ebb: "... I implored death to come and deliver me. I had lost the will to live, and I was giving in – the ultimate humiliation ...", he wrote afterwards in his book Annapurna. The casualties could now be carried in wicker chairs made to a design of Terray and they eventually reached the Gandaki.

Stretchers could be used on the track heading south beside the Gandaki but at Beni they took a detour because there was cholera in the area ahead. Oudot was having to start trimming dead flesh from Herzog's fingers using a rugine but by July he was needing to amputate as well as to continue trimming. Eventually he had to remove all of Lachenal's toes and, for Herzog, his fingers and toes. Because it was the rice planting season porters were abandoning the expedition all the time and it became impossible to find new recruits so they felt forced to adopt press gang tactics to be able to keep going. At last, on 6 July, they reached Nautanwa where they boarded a train that took them to Raxaul at the Indian border. On 6 July the climbers went on to Delhi to wait there while Herzog and a select group including two sherpas travelled to Kathmandu to be received on 11 July by the Maharajah of Nepal who greeted them as national heroes. There were a few cars in Kathmandu even though no roads led there – the vehicles had been carried in manually by hundreds of porters along the mountain trails.

== Reception in France ==
The telegram giving news of the success was reported by Le Figaro on 16 June but it was only on 17 July that the team arrived home at Orly Airport in Paris to be greeted by a wildly cheering crowd. Herzog was carried off the aircraft first. Paris Match printed a special edition for 19 August with articles about the expedition and the cover photo, taken by Lachenal but credited to Ichac, showing Herzog with his ice axe and Tricolour at the summit (see image at head of article). The magazine sold in record numbers and the photo remained an iconic image for years to come. (Note: "The cover photo, endlessly reproduced for years to come...". "Le 19 août, au cœur de l'été, Paris Match sort avec son numéro 74 sa première couverture " historique ". On y voit un géant des cimes emmitouflé dans sa tenue marine et brandissant un drapeau français contre le manche de son piolet. Maurice Herzog. " Victoire sur l'Himalaya ", titre Match en rouge dans un aplat au fond doré." "The cover featured the now-famous summit photo of Herzog holding aloft the Tricolor attached to the shaft of his ice axe ...". Legend for photograph of cover: "La couverture mythique de Paris Match, en 1950".) Herzog, Lachenal and Ang Tharkay were awarded the Légion d'honneur. (Note: The first European honour to a sherpa.) On 17 February 1951 Paris Match again ran the expedition on its front cover, this time focusing on the cinema premiere (attended by the President of France) of the film made by Ichac. The cover described Herzog as "our number one national hero" – in the accompanying six-page article Lachenal was not mentioned at all.

Herzog was kept at the American hospital at Neuilly-sur-Seine for the best part of a year where he dictated his book Annapurna, premier 8000 which sold over 11 million copies worldwide to become the best selling mountaineering book in history. (Note: Ahead of Jon Krakauer's book Into Thin Air.) He became the first international mountaineering celebrity after George Mallory and went on to be a successful politician. Fifty years later in France he was still as famous as Jacques Cousteau or Jean-Claude Killy whereas few remembered Lachenal or any of the others.

In June 2000, the French national postal services issued a 3 franc stamp (0.46 euro) celebrating the fiftieth anniversary of the climb, designed by Jean-Paul Cousin and engraved by André Lavergne.

== Annapurna and other expedition books ==
=== Books written by (and for) the members of the team ===
Over the following years several members of the expedition wrote about their experiences^{[bibliography]} and the varied accounts eventually led to controversy. At the airport, before setting off on the expedition, Herzog had required each member of the team to sign an undertaking not to publish or publicly communicate anything about the expedition for five years so initially Herzog's was the only version of events to be known. However, in 1996 two very different accounts were published and "a storm of controversy seized France". Herzog responded in 1998. After speaking to many of the people involved who were still alive, (Note: Roberts spoke to Guerin, Ballu, Cornuau, Jean-Claude Lachenal, the widows of Terray, Rébuffat and Couzy, Ichac's son, and Maurice Herzog.) in 2000 David Roberts, the American mountaineer and writer, published True Summit, discussing the whole issue. (Note: Translations of quotations originally in French have been taken from Roberts' book.)

==== Herzog (1951): Annapurna, premier 8000 and Regards vers l'Annapurna ====
For some years Herzog's Annapurna was the only account and it became a worldwide best-seller with over 11 million sales, a record for a mountaineering book. All the royalties from the publication (in France it remained the best-selling work of non-fiction for nearly a year) went to the Himalayan Committee and were used to fund future expeditions – in a direct sense Herzog did not benefit financially at all. The description of the expedition above in this article has generally been drawn from Herzog's book complemented by the "Annapurna" chapter from Terray's Conquistadors of the Useless.

James Ramsey Ullman wrote in the New York Herald Tribune that Annapurna was "a gallant and moving story, in some ways a terrible story" predicting it would become a mountaineering classic. Time wrote that the first half was like "a boy camper's letter to a chum" but what followed was a "harrowing ordeal-by-nature calculated to shiver the spirit of the toughest armchair explorer." Herzog and Ichac published a photographic book in 1951 Regards vers l'Annapurna and in 1981 Herzog published a historical work Les grandes aventures de l'Himalaya which had a section on Annapurna.

In the preface to the 1951 book Devies concentrates almost exclusively on the leader of the team: "The victory of the whole party was also, and above all, the victory of its leader". Herzog told of a happy team, all pulling together although at times Lachenal could be impetuous. Rarely did he mention any disagreement between team members and he, as leader, could resolve any spats quite easily. He very often quoted as direct speech the jaunty sort of remarks members of the team might have made, even on occasions when he was not present to have heard them.

==== Lachenal (1956): Carnets du vertige ====
Lachenal had kept notes and a diary and he was about to publish a book, Carnets du vertige, when he was killed in a skiing accident in 1955. Herzog took over Lachenal's work and he and Lucien Devies marked in many editorial suggestions for deletions before passing it to Herzog's brother, Gérard Herzog, for full editing. As published, the book comprised chapters about Lachenal's life written by Gérard Herzog from Lachenal's notes and material written by a journalist Philippe Cornuau who had been helping Lachenal with his draft – Cornuau said that when he had handed over the typescripts he had no idea of what was going to happen. None of what Lachenal or Cornuau had written appeared in the eventual publication. The book also included extracts from Lachenal's diary but only after many redactions – it was mostly the more congenial remarks that remained.

Lachenal had also left a typescript of some "Commentaires", intended to be published along with his diary. Herzog is commended as being as good as the professional guides for his stamina and technique, but, less agreeably for Herzog and Devies, he characterised the descent from the summit as a "débandade" (disorderly retreat) beside which on the typescript Devies jotted down "But no" and Maurice Herzog "Is this the place to say so?". When Lachenal had wanted to turn back before the summit Herzog thought it was his encouragement that had enabled Lachenal to continue. However Lachenal wrote that he agreed to go on because he thought that Herzog would not succeed in getting back down again alone. Herzog wrote in the margin of the typescript: "I didn't sense this. Perhaps after all I was unfair." On the other hand, Devies noted: "This must all be rewritten". In the event Gérard Herzog did not include any of the "Commentaires". The book was published in 1956 and Cornuau was shocked by what he read.

==== Terray (1961): Les conquérants de l'inutile ====
Terray's 1961 book, Les conquérants de l'inutile (Note: There had been gossip that Terray's book had been ghostwritten but this was proved false when a manuscript in Terray's handwriting turned up posthumously.) (published in English as "The Conquistadors of the Useless") included a long chapter about the Annapurna expedition. It was deliberately written to complement Herzog's book. (Note: Terray's book gives a historical background to the expedition and Nepal, has more to say on the details of the climb, and has far less dialogue than Herzog.) He provided a great deal of additional information but finishing with the avalanche on the way down to Camp II. Generally the book did not disagree with Herzog but did commend Lachenal's climbing ability: he said "Lachenal was by far the fastest and most brilliant climber I have ever known on delicate or loose terrain" but he could however lack patience and stamina.

==== Ballu (1996): Gaston Rébuffat: une vie pour la montagne ====
In association with Rébuffat's wife Françoise the journalist Yves Ballu wrote the first biography of the mountaineer. Rébuffat had become very disillusioned by the expedition and afterwards he restricted his climbing to the Alps. Françoise had persuaded him not to write about Annapurna during his lifetime because it would come across as too bitter so Ballu had interviewed him with a view to an eventual biography. Rébuffat had also prepared his own notes, and Françoise had kept his many letters to her during the expedition. Gaston Rébuffat: une vie pour la montagne was published in 1996.

The book contained many revelations. Rébuffat had been shocked by the requirement for an oath of obedience and he described it as "a certain Nazification". He considered it had been his initiative that led to the discovery of the eventual climbing route to the summit and that Herzog had not given him the credit for this. When in 1951 Lachenal had told Rébuffat that when he had been considering publishing an account of the expedition, someone from the official Himalayan Committee had threatened him that he might lose his job at the École Nationale de Ski et d'Alpinisme.

==== Lachenal (1996): Carnets du vertige ====
The same year Michel Guérin of Éditions Guérin, the mountaineering publisher, published an unexpurgated version of Lachenal's diary, also including the "Commentaires", under the same title Carnets du vertige. The original manuscript had been left to Lachenal's son Jean-Claude, who had become angry with the changes the editors had made in 1956. However, Herzog had befriended the Lachenal family and Jean-Claude had not wanted to cause any hurt. Eventually Guérin persuaded him to allow full publication.

There was a favourable book review in the Alpine Journal that provided an assessment of the situation. It was because he was a professional mountain guide that Lachenal had continued with Herzog to the summit. By doing so, through frostbite, he lost the ability to continue his career – and allowed Herzog to triumph in his.

In his diaries Lachenal admitted that a sherpa had fallen to his death from the Nilgiri ridge on their return march but no one else had mentioned this. No one else wrote of the daily use of morphine as a pain-killer while the casualties were being carried out and that Rébuffat was the only person who was attentive to Lachenal. Back in 1956 the text Gérard Herzog had excluded was about matters he considered too unpleasant for publication such as the climbers being offered young girls for sex and, when this was refused, being offered young boys instead. Minor comments had also been edited: "Evening, the eternal chicken and potatoes" had been removed while "We opened a bottle of white wine" had been kept.

==== Herzog (1998): L'autre Annapurna ====
The publication of these books in 1996 had caused serious controversy: mountaineering journalists started expressing doubts about the reliability of Herzog's book. Herzog's rejoinder was to publish a memoir L'autre Annapurna in 1998 when he was eighty years old.

Le Figaro described it as a meditation rather than a biography, "a witty and modest account". Libération deplored its name-dropping (Note: For example Herzog says he suggested the idea of a Peace Corps to President Kennedy who replies "An admirable suggestion, Maurice, we need an ideal for our youth.") and Pierre Mazeaud in Le Faucigny said "I succeeded in getting to page 16. But when I saw that he had not a single word for poor Lachenal, I couldn't get any further."

Herzog wrote that originally he had not intended to write a book but a hospital nurse had suggested writing would be good therapy for him. He said that even after nearly 50 years his Annapurna experience still imbued his reborn life with "indescribable happiness". (Note: The title of the American edition was intended to be "Born Twice".) He said that one member of the party was only accepted by the appointments committee on the understanding that Herzog could send him away at any time. However, like everyone in the team, this unnamed person had behaved as a "true comrade ... despite what was apparently divulged much later". Roberts has claimed that almost all expert observers agreed that it was Lachenal being referred to. Whereas in 1951 he had written that Lachenal, after his serious fall at Camp V, wanted Terray to take him down to Camp II, in L'autre Annapurna he said Lachenal just wanted to stay where he was and die. (Note: Terray's Conquistadors account agrees with Herzog's original version. Lachenal wrote he wanted to go down at least to Camp IV but finally agreed to climb back up.)

Interviewed by Roberts in 1999, Herzog told him the controversy had not bothered him. No one had doubted what he had written. He had shown the manuscript of Annapurna to everyone who had been on the expedition and they were impressed – even Lachenal. Contradicting his 1951 account, he said his frostbite had not been caused by losing his gloves because he had simply put his hands in his pockets. Instead, the cause was digging in the snow in their overnight crevasse trying to find the buried boots. Indeed, in L'autre Annapurna he did not mention losing his gloves at all. Explaining various differences between his two accounts Herzog said Annapurna was a novel, but a true novel. He considered his first book to be objective and the other was subjective.

=== Reactions in the press ===
The combination of Rébuffat's disillusioned story and the obvious censorship of Lachenal's writing caused a storm of revisionism in the French press. Frédéric Potet wrote: "The whole world remembers Maurice Herzog, the first biped to have trod, in 1950, atop a mountain of more than 8,000 metres. The others – Rébuffat, Terray, Lachenal? Who were they? Where did they come from? What did they do?" Major newspapers in France and mountaineering magazines worldwide joined the criticism. In the American Alpine Journal: "I am sorry we have had to wait so long for the true story. All around us we can see the damage done by false information." (Note: Barthe's review in AAJ provides a good brief summary of the situation.)

La Montagne et Alpinisme, however, considered there was too much fuss: five-year embargoes were normal in 1950 and the distinction between professional guides and amateur climbers had lost any significance by that time.

Montagnes magazine investigated and reported that Terray had not received the Légion d'honneur because Devies and Herzog had been opposed to it. They also found that, despite rumours that several mountaineers had been seriously injured, their wives waiting anxiously at home were told nothing by Devies because of the exclusive publication contract with Le Figaro and Paris Match. Le Monde discovered that before leaving for France Ichac had searched Rébuffat bodily to check he was not smuggling back any film. Ichac had not gone above Camp II so Rébuffat had taken all the higher photographs except those at the summit taken by Lachenal and one by Herzog. Despite this, all published photographs were credited to Ichac. It later emerged that Rébuffat succeeded in covertly bringing back the film used by Lachenal and he developed it before returning all the photographs but one to Ichac. The one he kept back, which he kept for the rest of his life, had been too embarrassing for Lachenal to bear becoming public – the one of Herzog waving the tyre company Kléber's pennant on the summit.

Interviewed by Le Monde, Herzog said "What I wrote in Annapurna is the exact truth. ... My writings have never been contradicted." To Montagnes he said the passages had been removed from Lachenal's book because they did not interest the editors.

The 1998 publication of Herzog's L'autre Annapurna again stirred up the press. In an interview Herzog now said Lachenal was an excessive personality and he and Devies had removed passages from Lachenal's draft to avoid charges of defamation and to keep things calm. He said Herzog's brother had helped Lachenal because he was incapable of writing, that Lachenal was very happy with the rewrite and that Lachenal's son had made up the story about the draft being distorted. The sherpa Foutharkay was drawn into the arguments, saying that Sir Edmund Hillary was a hero in Nepal but Herzog not so.

Roberts' book about the controversy has itself also been criticised. In reviewing True Summit the American Alpine Journal said "David Roberts has none of the Himalayan expedition experience necessary to put the events in context."

== Summit Controversy ==
Even as far back as 1950 a small number of people doubted the expedition had reached the summit. One of the problems was the famous "summit photo" (see image at head of article) that seems to show the ground sloping up higher than Herzog's feet. Also, after Lachenal's death it was claimed he used to say he had no memory of the summit, or another version was that he had once said had not got there at all. Even fifty years later there were doubts from a small minority. Herzog had written there was a fierce wind at the summit but in the photo he seems to be having to hold the flag out straight. The only summit photograph taken by Herzog, one of Lachenal, he kept hidden until after Lachenal's death. This blurred image shows him sitting leaning against a rock not looking at all victorious.

On the other hand, Terray wrote that, although Lachenal could not remember anything of the descent, he had told Terray of his feelings at the summit: "Those moments when one had expected a fugitive and piercing happiness had in fact brought only a painful sense of emptiness." Rébuffat's wife said her husband had never doubted they had got there. His journal recorded that, when they met up at Camp V, Herzog suggested Rébuffat and Terray go up to the summit while Herzog and Lachenal continued down. They would have noticed if their footprints had not extended all the way to the top.

Also, Lachenal's diary says he took the summit photographs from a ledge slightly below the summit. When Herzog was interviewed by Le Monde he said that what appeared in the photographs like an arête of snow receding away upwards was actually very close and only reached to his waist. It was a cornice at the crest of the summit, too weak to be trodden on. In 1970 Henry Day took part in an expedition ascending using much the same route and they were able to take photographs with very similar perspectives. Lachenal had the reputation of being an honest man, even bluntly honest. This, and the likelihood that he had little personal reason to fake his private diary, leaves little doubt about its accuracy – it is very widely accepted that they did indeed reach the top of Annapurna. In his book Annapurna: 50 Years of Expeditions in the Death Zone (2000) Reinhold Messner regarded it as "an indisputable fact".

== See also ==
- 1970 British Annapurna South Face expedition

== Other accounts ==
=== First-hand accounts of the expedition ===
In chronological order of first (French) publication.

- Herzog, Maurice (1951). Annapurna, premier 8000 (in French). Éditions Arthaud.
  - Herzog, Maurice (1952). Annapurna. Conquest of the First 8000-Metre Peak (26,493ft). Translated by Morin, Nea; Adam Smith, Janet. London: Jonathan Cape. Introduction by Shipton, Eric.
- Herzog, Maurice (November 1951). "Annapurna" (PDF). Alpine Journal. 58 (282): 155–168.
- Herzog, Maurice; Ichac, Marcel (1951). Regards vers l'Annapurna (in French). Arthaud.
- Lachenal, Louis (1956). Herzog, Gérard (ed.). Carnets du vertige (in French). Paris: Pierre Horay. No English translation.
- Terray, Lionel (1961). Les conquérants de l'inutile. Des Alpes à l'Annapurna (in French). Paris: Éditions Gallimard.
  - Terray, Lionel (1963). Conquistadors of the Useless: From the Alps to Annapurna. Translated by Sutton, Geoffrey. Gollancz.
- Herzog, Maurice (1981). "Un autre regard". Les grandes aventures de l'Himalaya. Annapurna, Nanga Parbat, Chogori, K2 (in French). Grenoble: JC Lattes.
- Ballu, Yves (1996). Gaston Rébuffat : une vie pour la montagne (in French). Paris: Éditions Hoëbeke. ISBN 978-2842300159. Not first-hand but a posthumous biography, published with Rébuffat's approval.
- Lachenal, Louis (1996). Carnets du vertige (in French). Michel Guérin. Unexpurgated version.
- Herzog, Maurice (1998). L'autre Annapurna (in French). Paris: Éditions Robert Laffont. ISBN 978-2221087138.
- Herzog, Maurice (2007). Renaître: une autre vie après l'Annapurna (in French). Paris: Jacob-Duvernet. ISBN 978-2847241624.

=== Other ===
- Buffet, Charlie (7 June 2000). "Maurice Herzog, 81 ans, héros de l'Annapurna, cultive depuis 1950 la légende qui lui a ouvert une vie d'honneurs et de pouvoir. Droits d'hauteur". Libération.fr (in French). Archived from the original on 4 April 2018.
- Douglas, Ed (14 December 2012). "Maurice Herzog obituary". Guardian.
- Messner, Reinhold (2000). Annapurna: 50 years of expeditions in the death zone. Seattle: Mountaineers Book. ISBN 978-0898867381.
- "Victoire sur l'Himalaya". Paris Match: 12–27. 19 August 1950.
