= 9th Berlin International Film Festival =

1959 film festival in West Berlin, Germany

- Festival poster
- Location: West Berlin, Germany
- Founded: 1951
- Awards: Golden Bear: Les Cousins
- Festival date: 26 June – 7 July 1959
- Website: Website

Berlin International Film Festival chronology
- 10th 8th

The 9th annual Berlin International Film Festival was held from 26 June to 7 July 1959. The festival welcomed the cinematic movement known as the French New Wave and screened the work of directors such as Jean-Luc Godard, Agnès Varda and François Truffaut.

The Golden Bear was awarded to Les Cousins directed by Claude Chabrol.

== Juries ==
The following people were announced as being on the jury for the festival:

=== Main Competition ===
- Robert Aldrich, American filmmaker - Jury President
- Johan Jacobsen, Danish filmmaker and producer
- Charles Ford, French writer and filmmaker
- John Bryan, British production designer
- Ignazio Tranquilli, Italian writer and playwright
- Shigeo Miyata, Japanese painter and physician
- Wali Eddine Sameh, Emirati director
- O. E. Hasse, West-German actor
- Gerhard Prager, West-German writer and producer
- Fritz Podehl, West-German producer
- Walther Schmieding, West-German journalist

=== Documentary and Short Films Competition ===
- Curt Oertel, West-German filmmaker and director of photography - Jury President
- M.D. Bath, Indian
- Hans Cürlis, West-German director
- Paul Davay, Belgian film critic
- Odd Hølaas, Norwegian journalist and writer
- Katina Paxinou, Greek actress
- Alfonso Sánchez Martínez, Spanish journalist and film critic

== Official Sections ==
=== Main Competition ===
The following films were in competition for the Golden Bear award:

English title	Original title	Director(s)	Production Country
And That on Monday Morning	Und das am Montagmorgen	Luigi Comencini	West Germany
Archimède le clochard		Gilles Grangier	France
Ask Any Girl		Charles Walters	United States
Astero	Αστέρω	Dinos Dimopoulos	Greece
The Bell Tower: Missing Another Dawn	종각	Ju-nam Yang	South Korea
Beyond All Limits	Flor de mayo	Roberto Gavaldón	Mexico
Broken Spell	سیامک یاسمی	Siamak Yasemi	Iran
The Defeated Victor	Un uomo facile	Paolo Heusch	Italy
Hassan and Nayima	حسن ونعيمة	Henry Barakat	Egypt
The Hidden Fortress	隠し砦の三悪人	Akira Kurosawa	Japan
Home Is the Hero		Fielder Cook	Ireland
La caída		Leopoldo Torre Nilsson	Argentina
Les Cousins		Claude Chabrol	France
The Master and His Servants	Herren og hans tjenere	Arne Skouen	Norway
Naked Sun	裸 の 貸与	Miyoji Ieki	Japan
Panoptikum 59		Walter Kolm-Veltée	Austria
The Phantom Carriage	Körkarlen	Arne Mattsson	Sweden
The Poet and the Little Mother	Poeten og Lillemor	Erik Balling	Denmark
The Rest Is Silence	Der Rest ist Schweigen	Helmut Käutner	West Germany
Sagar Sangamey	সাগর সঙ্গমে বাংলা ছবি	Debaki Bose	India
The Siege of Pinchgut		Harry Watt	United Kingdom
Sven Tuuva the Hero	Sven Tuuva	Edvin Laine	Finland
Ten Ready Rifles	Diez fusiles esperan	José Luis Sáenz de Heredia	Spain, Italy
That Kind of Woman		Sidney Lumet	United States
Three Loves in Rio	Meus Amores no Rio	Carlos Hugo Christensen	Brazil, Argentina
Tiger Bay		J. Lee Thompson	United Kingdom
The Village on the River	Dorp aan de rivier	Fons Rademakers	Netherlands
Wolves of the Deep	Lupi nell'abisso	Silvio Amadio	Italy

=== Documentary and Short Films Competition ===
English title	Original title	Director(s)	Production Country
Anneaux d'or		René Vautier	Tunisia, France
Das Knalleidoskop		Herbert Hunger	West Germany
Gloria della Marciana		Emilio Marsili	Italy
Horse on Holiday	Hest på sommerferie	Astrid Henning-Jensen	Denmark, United Kingdom
I ditteri		Alberto Ancilotto	Italy
Paradise and Fire Oven	Paradies und Feuerofen	Herbert Viktor	West Germany
Power Among Men		Alexander Hammid, Gian Luigi Polidoro and V. R. Sarma	United Kingdom
Praise the Sea	Prijs de zee	Herman van der Horst	Netherlands
Radha and Krishna	राधा और कृष्ण	J. S. Bhownagary	India
Stars at Noon	Les Étoiles de midi	Jacques Ertaud and Marcel Ichac	France
Tierra mágica		Massimo Dallamano and Vittorio Valentini	Venezuela
White Wilderness		James Algar	United States

== Official Awards ==
The following prizes were awarded by the Jury:

=== Main Competition ===
- Golden Bear: Les Cousins by Claude Chabrol
- Silver Bear for Best Director: Akira Kurosawa for The Hidden Fortress
- Silver Bear for Best Actress: Shirley MacLaine for Ask Any Girl
- Silver Bear for Best Actor: Jean Gabin for Archimède le clochard
- Silver Bear Extraordinary Jury Prize: Hayley Mills for Tiger Bay

=== Documentary and Short Films Competition ===
- Golden Bear (Documentaries): White Wilderness by James Algar
- Short Film Golden Bear: Praise the Sea by Herman van der Horsti
- Silver Bear for Best Short Film:
  - Das Knalleidoskop by Herbert Hunger
  - Radha and Krishna by J. S. Bhownagary
- Silver Bear Extraordinary Jury Prize (Short film): Horse on Holiday by Astrid Henning-Jensen
- Recognition of honor (Short Film): I ditteri by Alberto Ancilotto

== Independent Awards ==
=== FIPRESCI Award ===
- The Hidden Fortress by Akira Kurosawa

=== OCIC Award ===
- Paradise and Fire Oven by Victor Herbert

=== Youth Film Award (Jugendfilmpreis) ===
- Best Feature Film Suitable for Young People: Naked Sun by Miyoji Ieki
- Best Documentary Film Suitable for Young People: Paradise and Fire Oven by Victor Herbert
- Best Short Film Suitable for Young People: Anneaux d'or by René Vautier
