= Banner in the Sky =

Novel by James Ramsey Ullman

- Author: James Ramsey Ullman
- Publisher: Harper Collins
- Publication date: 1954
- Pages: 252
- ISBN: 9780064470483

Banner in the Sky is a book written by James Ramsey Ullman, published by the J. B. Lippincott Company in 1954. The story is based on the first ascent of the Matterhorn and follows a young boy, Rudi Matt, who is determined to climb a mountain called the Citadel. The book earned a Newbery Honor in 1955 and was later adapted into the Disney film Third Man on the Mountain.

== Background ==
The book was published by the J. B. Lippincott Company in 1954. The book was inspired by a real-life event in 1865 when Edward Whymper, an Englishman, became the first to climb the Matterhorn. Tragically, during Whymper's descent from the mountain, four of his companions died. Shortly before writing the book, Ullman had taken a trip to the Swiss Alps with his son, where he climbed the mountain himself. The book inspired a Canadian dentist to also climb the Matterhorn.

== Plot ==
The story is set in Switzerland in the small town of Kurtal at the base of a mountain called the Citadel. Josef Matt died in an attempt to scale the mountain fifteen years ago, and no one has attempted the climb since. Sixteen-year-old Rudi Matt is determined to carry his father's red shirt to the top of the Citadel despite his family's reservations. However, Rudi convinced two of the town's best guides to join him with the help of the English Captain Winter. Rudi is picked on by the other boys because he is small and does not have the complexion of a rough mountaineer. Rudi is familiar with the lower slopes of the Citadel and is eager to prove that he can conquer the mountain. He has been studying the lower slopes of the mountain with the help of his coworker Teo, a crippled old cook who had assisted Josef Matt on the expedition that led to his death. Rudi often sneaks out after work and practices climbing, driven by his ambition and determination.

== Reception ==
Robert G. Carlsen noted in his review that while Rudi's rebellious attitude may be questionable to the adult reader, the book remains "unquestionably a fine boy's story." The novel received a favorable review from Laura Scott Meyers in the El Paso Herald-Post; however, she expressed a great admiration for Ullman's previous work—The White Tower. The book was the runner-up for a Newbery Award in 1955.
