= Step Brothers =

Step Brothers may refer to:

- The Four Step Brothers, an African-American dance group
- Step-brother, a member of a stepfamily: a son by a previous marriage of one's parent's second spouse
- Step Brothers (duo), an American hip hop supergroup and record production team
- Step Brothers (film), a 2008 American comedy film
- Stepbrothers (1957 film), a 1957 Japanese drama film
- Step Brothers (EP), by G-Eazy and Carnage (2017)

== See also ==
- Step-brother, male children born of two different families who have been joined by the marriage of at least one of their respective parents
