= Third Man on the Mountain =

1959 film

- Theatrical release poster
- Directed by: Ken Annakin
- Written by: Eleanore Griffin
- Based on: Banner in the Sky by James Ramsey Ullman
- Produced by: Bill Anderson; Walt Disney
- Starring: Michael Rennie; James MacArthur; Janet Munro; James Donald; Herbert Lom; Laurence Naismith
- Cinematography: Harry Waxman
- Edited by: Peter Boita
- Music by: William Alwyn
- Production company: Walt Disney Productions
- Distributed by: Buena Vista Distribution
- Release date: November 10, 1959
- Running time: 105 minutes
- Country: United States
- Language: English
- Budget: $2 million
- Box office: $1,700,000 (US/Canada rentals)

Third Man on the Mountain is a 1959 American family adventure film by Walt Disney Productions, directed by Ken Annakin and starring Michael Rennie, James MacArthur and Janet Munro. Set during the golden age of alpinism, its plot concerns young Swiss man Rudi Matt, who conquers the mountain that killed his father. It is based on Banner in the Sky, a James Ramsey Ullman 1955 novel about the first ascent of a mountain called the Citadel, and was televised under this name.

== Plot ==
In 1865, while working in a hotel kitchen in the small town of Kurtal in the Swiss Alps, Rudi Matt daydreams of reaching the summit of the Citadel. He is startled out of his daydreams by Old Teo Zurbriggen, the hotel's cook and a former mountain guide, and he breaks several dishes. Teo lectures him, but Rudi sneaks away from the kitchen to fetch his hidden climbing gear and go climbing in the mountains outside of town. At the encouragement of Lizbeth Hempel, the hotel proprietor's daughter who has an interest in Rudi, Teo lies to cover for Rudi's absence. Up on the glacier, Rudi hears a cry for help and rescues British mountaineer Captain John Winter, who has fallen into a crevasse. On their way back to Kurtal, Rudi and Winter discuss the climbing accident on the Citadel that led to the death of Rudi's father, who saved his client from freezing by wrapping him in his red shirt. Rudi tells Winter, ashamed, that he is a dishwasher in the village and asks Winter not to tell anyone that he was climbing in the hills.

Back in Kurtal, Klaus Wesselhoft vies for Lizbeth's attention, even though she is only interested in Rudi. They are interrupted by the approach of Franz Lerner, a mountaineering guide who is Rudi's uncle. Lizbeth rushes to the kitchen ahead of Franz to make sure Teo doesn't give Rudi away. When Franz drops in to the kitchen to check on Rudi, he is furious to discover that Rudi has run away and furious with Teo for covering for him. That evening, Franz tells Rudi that he knows about Rudi's activities on the glacier, and Franz and Ilse (Rudi's mother) discuss the future they have in mind for him. During the conversation, Captain Winter arrives and asks if Franz is available for a climb on the Wunderhorn the next day. Franz mentions that they will need a porter for the climb, and Winter suggests Rudi. Franz is against it, but relents when Captain Winter reveals that Rudi saved his life earlier that day.

During the climb, Winter looks at the face of the Citadel and discusses possible routes with Franz, though Franz is uninterested. As Winter takes notes and Franz naps, Rudi sneaks away to search for a better route back down, but becomes trapped and has to be rescued by Franz and Winter. The next day, Winter prepares to leave Kurtal for a time and tells Franz he would like to climb the Citadel with him and asks him not to be too hard on Rudi. While preparing for work at the hotel, Rudi is furious to discover that the boots and climbing gear that were gifted to him by Winter have been taken by his uncle, but then encounters Lizbeth, who has bought the boots from Franz.

The next day, Teo takes Rudi and Lizbeth to the Felsberg to teach Rudi about how to be a guide. Back at the kitchen, Rudi discovers that Captain Winter has left Kurtal for good after his plans with Franz didn't work out. In the tavern, Franz rants about Winter's foolishness. At the encouragement of Teo and Lizbeth, Rudi asks Franz for another chance to join him as a porter. Franz, drunk, refuses and humiliates him in front of all the men of the village. During the choral festival the next night, Rudi overhears the men of the village talking about seeing a climbing party camped on the slopes of the Citadel. Rudi leaves the village to join the climbers. In the hut, he again meets Captain Winter, who is climbing with Emil Saxo, a guide from the rival village of Broli. Rudi asks to join Winter's party, lying to him and saying that he had been given permission by Franz. Winter agrees to take Rudi with them, and they make a series of climbs to reconnoiter routes to the top.

In Kurtal, Teo and Lizbeth watch the face of the Citadel through the telescope and see Rudi with the climbing party. Teo goes into the tavern and shames the men of the village for their cowardice and reveals that Rudi is the third man on the mountain. Franz, incensed, says that he will go up to the Citadel to retrieve Rudi and talk Captain Winter and Saxo out of the climb. Other men of the village, including Teo, join him. That evening, Winter and Saxo leave to get supplies in Broli. As they leave, Winter, believing Franz has given Rudi permission to be there, sends Rudi back to Kurtal to ask Franz once more to join them. Instead, Rudi climbs further up the mountain trying to discover his father's route to the top while the weather deteriorates. In the storm, he sees a lightning flash through a chimney in the rocks and determines that that is his father's route past the Fortress formation where the fatal climbing accident occurred, but the weather is too severe for him to continue.

Winter and Saxo return to the base camp and meet Franz, who reveals that Rudi did not have his permission to climb. As they talk, Rudi, exhausted from having been on the mountain all night, enters the hut and exclaims that he has found his father's route up the mountain. Teo argues that Rudi should have his chance to climb, while Winter tries to convince Franz again to join the climbing party. When Saxo accuses the Kurtal men of cowardice, Franz argues that he is no coward and agrees to join them. Rudi, Winter, Franz, and Saxo climb the mountain the next day, and Rudi guides them through his father's route. Above the Fortress, Franz halts the party so that Winter, who has suffered a head injury during the climb, can rest for the night. During the night, Saxo approaches Franz and tells him that Winter is too weak to continue and asks Franz to join him to climb to the top while leaving Winter and Rudi behind. Franz refuses, saying that a guide from Kurtal would never leave his client while going on alone. Early the next morning, Saxo leaves alone, while Rudi, having overheard the conversation the previous night, sneaks out of camp to follow him.

Back in Kurtal, Ilse discovers that Rudi is on the mountain and is furious that the village men have lied to her. She blames Lizbeth for Rudi's obsession with the mountains, but Lizbeth tells her that Rudi must do what makes him happy. Ilse, though saddened, understands the truth of what Lizbeth says. Winter and Franz awaken and go after Rudi, who is racing Saxo to the top of the mountain. Saxo falls and injures himself badly. Rudi sees him fall and climbs down to help him. Saxo derisively tells Rudi to leave and claim his prize and become "his father's son", which prompts Rudi to instead tend to Saxo's injuries and help him down the mountain. Franz and Winter encounter Rudi's pack but do not find Rudi and Saxo. Pressing on, they carry Rudi's pack - with his father's red shirt - and climb to the summit, while Rudi helps Saxo safely back to their base camp.

The villagers of Kurtal celebrate the climbers' conquest of the Citadel, but Winter eschews the credit and says the victory belongs to Rudi and his father, then invites Rudi to look through the telescope, where he sees that his father's red shirt has been planted at the top of the Citadel.

== Cast ==
- Michael Rennie as Captain John Winter
- James MacArthur as Rudi Matt
- Janet Munro as Lizbeth Hempel
- James Donald as Franz Lerner
- Herbert Lom as Emil Saxo
- Laurence Naismith as Teo Zurbriggen
- Lee Patterson as Klaus Wesselhoft
- Walter Fitzgerald as Herr Hempel
- Nora Swinburne as Frau Matt
- Ferdy Mayne as Andreas Krickel
- Roger Delgado as Italian climber (uncredited)
- Helen Hayes as a tourist (uncredited)
- Kenneth Brannan as a tourist (uncredited)

== Production ==
=== Original novel ===
The film was based on the 1954 novel Banner in the Sky by James Ramsey Ullman, who had written The White Tower. The novel was based on the real-life first ascent of the Matterhorn in 1865. Captain John Winter was based on Edward Whymper but the young character of Rudi Matt was entirely fictional. The New York Times called it "a superb mountain climbing story for younger readers".

=== Development ===
The film rights were bought by Walt Disney in July 1957. It was his fifth film shot in Britain, following Treasure Island, The Story of Robin Hood, The Sword and the Rose and Rob Roy: The Highland Rogue.

In January the lead role of Rudi was given to James MacArthur, who had just been in Disney's The Light in the Forest. Eleanore Griffin was assigned to write the script. The job of directing was given to Ken Annakin, who had made a number of films for Disney. David Niven was to play the other lead of Captain Winter. Annakin did a location reconnaissance in Switzerland and did pre-production work in Los Angeles.

Annakin wrote that "Jim was stocky, muscular, good-humoured — the adopted son of Helen Hayes — well educated and with an excellent sense of humour". In June 1958 Michael Rennie replaced Niven.

Janet Munro made the film as the second in a five-picture deal with Disney, the first being Darby O'Gill and the Little People.

=== Shooting ===
Filming began June 23, 1958. The film was made on location in Switzerland with Gaston Rébuffat as the head of the mountain second unit photography. It was mostly shot in Zermatt, a location that Disney was familiar with from his ski trips. The studio portions of the film were done in London. Zermatt was the model for the fictional town of Kurtal. Mountaineering scenes were shot in Rotenboden.

The entire cast and crew, numbering 170, did a course in mountaineering before filming began on June 23, 1958.

James Donald fell eighteen feet off a crag shooting a scene but escaped with minor injuries. Assistant cameraman Pierre Tairraz fell in a crevasse and broke three ribs.

The extraordinary difficulty of making this film on the Matterhorn was chronicled in the "Perilous Assignments" episode of Walt Disney Presents.

Helen Hayes visited her son MacArthur on location and told Disney that she wished she could be in the film. Disney had a small role written for her. MacArthur said: "On my day off I climbed the Matterhorn".

=== Post-production ===
The musical score for Third Man on the Mountain was composed by William Alwyn and features the original song "Climb the Mountain" by Franklyn Marks.

== Reception ==
Bosley Crowther of The New York Times wrote that "it is open to question whether the techniques of climbing pictured here, and some of the desperate deeds of mountaineering, were used almost a hundred years ago. Be that as it may, and however one feels about accuracy, the business of mountain climbing is excitingly visioned all the way ... What's more, the scenery is lovely." Variety said: "It has the sort of high altitude thrills to send the viewer cowering deep in his seat and the sort of moving drama to put him on the edge of it." Philip K. Scheuer of the Los Angeles Times wrote: "The scenery alone ... is worth the price. A Walt Disney company spent grueling months in the Swiss Alps grinding out painful shot after shot, but they came back with a Technicolor treat that is high on suspense, excitement and simple, uncomplicated fun." Richard L. Coe of The Washington Post declared it "a fine example of a Disney Fiction Film, well photographed and welcomely wholesome." Harrison's Reports said: "As is the case with most Disney productions, meticulous attention has been paid to production values, and the film is overloaded with cloying sentiment. However, it is difficult to present a logical argument against a successful formula, and there seems to be no reason to deviate businesswise from the recent Disney pattern." The Monthly Film Bulletin called the mountain scenes "almost continuously impressive and terrifying. But Ken Annakin seems happier selecting camera angles and arranging foolhardy action sequences than directing dialogue. Everyone but Michael Rennie and James MacArthur overacts vigorously, possibly in an effort to prevent the valley scenes seeming too elementary for schoolboy audiences. But in fact the whole buoyant and absurdly exciting production seems set fair to become a children's screen classic."

Annakin wrote the film became Walt Disney's "favourite real-life movie and still has not been equalled for its climbing shots combined with a good story and romance. But there are purists who might say Walt fell between two stools. Climbing buffs have no time for the sentimental scenes between Jim and Janet, and Walt's Swiss choirs and alpenhorns, which undoubtedly soften the impact of the movie. But you could never change Walt from his determination to make complete, all-around family entertainment."

The film inspired the Matterhorn Bobsleds attraction at Disneyland Park. Disney sent a souvenir on a postcard to his lead imagineer at the time Vic Greene, writing only two words: "build this". The Matterhorn, as depicted in the film, also appears in the background on the left beyond the Cinderella Castle in the animated Walt Disney Pictures logo in use since 2022 for the studio's 100th anniversary.

== See also ==
- List of American films of 1959
