= Jacques Ertaud =

French film director

- Born: 18 November 1924; Paris, France
- Died: 18 November 1995 (aged 71); Paris, France
- Occupations: Film director, screenwriter
- Years active: 1959-1995

Jacques Ertaud (18 November 1924 – 18 November 1995) was a French film director and screenwriter. Along with Marcel Ichac, he co-directed the film Stars at Noon, which entered into the 9th Berlin International Film Festival.

== Selected filmography ==
- Stars at Noon (1959)
- The Link and the Chain (1963)
- Sans famille (1981)
