= The White Tower (film) =

1950 film by Ted Tetzlaff

- Directed by: Ted Tetzlaff
- Screenplay by: Paul Jarrico
- Based on: The White Tower; 1945 novel by James Ramsey Ullman
- Produced by: Sid Rogell
- Starring: Glenn Ford; Alida Valli; Claude Rains; Oscar Homolka; Lloyd Bridges; Cedric Hardwicke
- Cinematography: Ray Rennahan
- Edited by: Samuel E. Beetley
- Music by: Roy Webb
- Production company: RKO Pictures
- Distributed by: RKO Pictures
- Release date: July 1, 1950 (New York)
- Running time: 98 minutes
- Country: United States
- Language: English

The White Tower is a 1950 American Technicolor adventure film directed by Ted Tetzlaff and starring Glenn Ford and Alida Valli. It is based on the 1945 novel of the same name by James Ramsey Ullman. The film was produced and released by RKO Pictures.

== Plot ==
Carla Alten is determined to conquer the White Tower, a difficult, unconquered peak in the Swiss Alps that had claimed her mountaineer father's life. Her climbing party consists of the wise veteran guide Andreas and four other men. Englishman Nicholas Radcliffe is concerned that he is too old to manage the climb. Alcoholic French writer Paul Delambre claims that he is just finishing a book about the mountain, but his wife treats Delambre and his idea with utter contempt. American Martin Ordway, an easygoing former pilot whose plane was downed in the region during World War II, is attracted to Carla. Against her best judgment, Carla is persuaded to enlist an expert German climber named Hein, whose wool cap bears a faded Luftwaffe insignia.

During the climb, the team members' strengths and weaknesses are revealed. Ordway and Carla are falling in love. Radcliffe acknowledges that he has reached his limit and returns to the base camp rather than endangering the others.

At the next stage, morning finds Delambre too drunk to continue. The rest of the team leaves him in a tent with a safe fire. That night, during a blizzard, he unearths a bottle that he had hidden, finishes his book and accidentally sets the tent on fire, sending the pages flying into the storm. He staggers drunkenly into the darkness and dies.

It becomes clear that Hein wants to prove Aryan superiority by becoming the first to climb the mountain, and Ordway follows his tracks. Stuck on a snow bridge, Hein refuses to take Ordway's outstretched hand and plummets to his death. Suffering from snow blindness, Ordway collapses within sight of the peak. When Carla and Andreas find him, Andreas mentions that Carla could easily reach the top, but she insists that it is more important to help Ordway safely descend the mountain.

There is no permanent damage to Ordway's eyes, and he and Carla decide to marry.

== Cast ==
- Glenn Ford as Martin Ordway
- Alida Valli as Carla Alten (as Valli)
- Claude Rains as Paul DeLambre
- Oskar Homolka as Andreas (as Oscar Homolka)
- Cedric Hardwicke as Dr. Nicholas Radcliffe (as Sir Cedric Hardwicke)
- Lloyd Bridges as Hein
- June Clayworth as Mme. Astrid DeLambre
- Lotte Stein as Frau Andreas

== Reception ==
In a contemporary review for The New York Times, critic Bosley Crowther wrote: "Paul Jarrico has gathered from James Ramsey Ullman's noted tale ... a drama that is crammed with action and significant incident, at least. All of the danger and excitement, the toil and heart-breaking distress, of high-altitude mountain climbing are ticketed in the episodes in his [Jarrico's] script. And Ted Tetzlaff has brought it to the screen in a realistic style. ... [T]he use of the six mountain-climbers to symbolize the natures of mankind, with the mountain itself a symbolization of the challenge of life, is bookish stuff—and this becomes plainly evident in the sharp pictorial clarity of a film. Furthermore, the necessity of having these various symbols explain themselves and demonstrate their predestinations makes for a lot of tedious gab."

== See also ==
- List of American films of 1950
