= Francis de Noyelle =

French diplomat

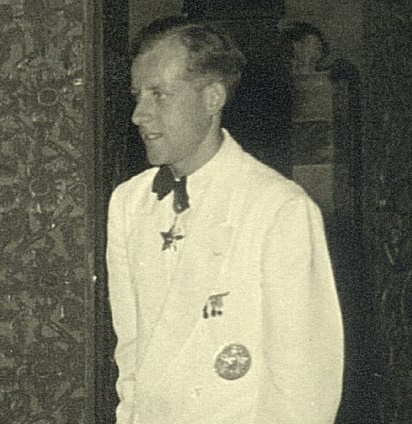
- Francis de Noyelle in 1950.
- Predecessor: François de Testa
- Successor: Lionel de Warren
- Full name: Francis Deloche de Noyelle
- Known for: Diplomat, Resistance fighter, mountaineer
- Born: December 9, 1919; 16th arrondissement of Paris
- Died: March 30, 2017 (aged 97); 18th arrondissement of Paris

Notes
- Paris Faculty of Arts University of Montpellier Lycée Janson-de-Sailly Paris Faculty of Law University of Poitiers

Francis Deloche de Noyelle (December 9, 1919, in Paris – March 30, 2017, in Paris) was a French diplomat. He was French ambassador to Nepal between 1980 and 1984.

During the Second World War, after spending two years in the office of the Prefect of Hérault, Francis de Noyelle played an important role in the French Resistance, particularly in Isère and Paris. A member of the Goélette network, (Note: He plays the role of “liaison officer”.) his mission was to recruit partisans and find addresses to store all the documents stolen from the Nazis during the Occupation. He received several distinctions for his acts of resistance.

After the war, he embarked on a 40-year diplomatic career. As a secretary at the New Delhi embassy, he was a member of the famous 1950 French Annapurna expedition led by Maurice Herzog, which conquered Annapurna. (Note: Annapurna is officially the first of 14 peaks over 8,000 meters to have been climbed on Earth.) Thereafter, Francis de Noyelle alternated between posts in the central administration of the Ministry of Foreign Affairs and positions in the French embassies in Czechoslovakia, Morocco, Canada and, finally, Nepal.

After being awarded the Légion d'honneur and the Ordre national du Mérite, he was, at the time of his death in 2017, the last survivor of his Himalayan expedition.

== Biography ==
=== Youth and the Resistance (1919-1945) ===
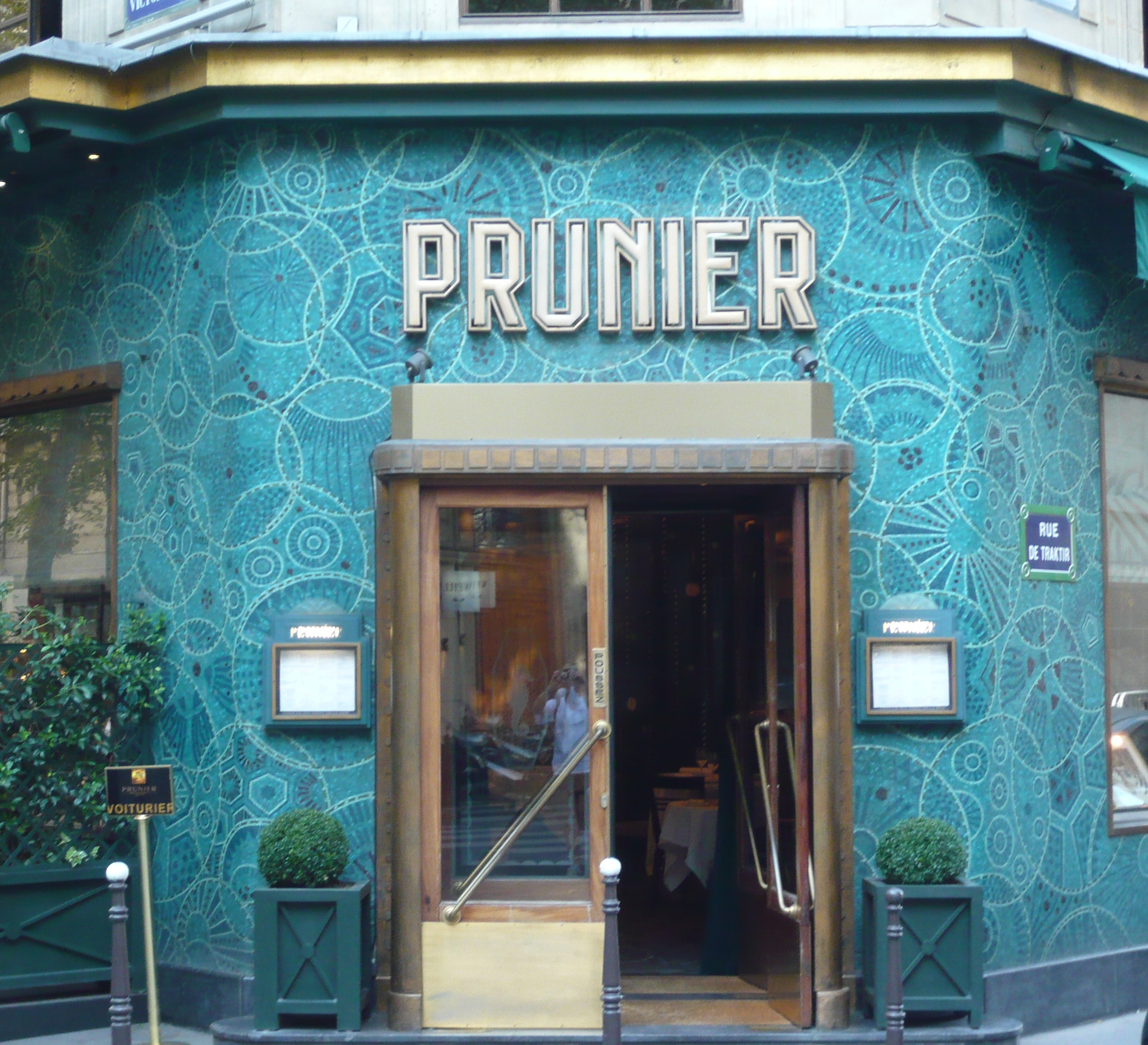
Francis de Noyelle grew up right next door to the Prunier restaurant.

Francis Deloche de Noyelle, born on December 9, 1919, in the 16th arrondissement of Paris, is the son of diplomats: André Deloche de Noyelle, Minister Plenipotentiary, and Jeanne née de Geer. He grew up at rue de Traktir, right next door to the Prunier restaurant. He studied at the Lycée Janson-de-Sailly, then at the faculties of literature and law in Paris, Poitiers, Montpellier and Grenoble.

Between 1941 and 1942, he was deputy chief of staff to the Prefect of Hérault. During the Second World War, he took part in the Resistance in Isère. From January 1943, while undercover as a student and scout from Grenoble, he ran a small network, Goélette (part of the Bureau central de renseignements et d'action), which extended as far as Valence. Under the orders of General de Gaulle, he was tasked with expanding the network. His mission also involved finding “depot ” (Note: drop boxes) addresses, where all the information obtained (photographs, plans, and stolen documents) could be stored before being sent to General de Gaulle's intelligence service in London. After recruiting members of the Jackson family (Phillip, Toquette, and Sumner), he set up a Resistance base in Paris at 11, avenue Fochd. (Note: This location is next to 1, rue Traktir, where Francis de Noyelle spent his childhood. This is a strategic location since the Gestapo headquarters and several Nazi officers' apartments are located along the Avenue Foch.) After the liberation of Grenoble in August 1944, he became “liaison officer interpreter for the leading battalion commander of the liberating troops”.

=== Diplomatic career and ascent of Annapurna (1945-1985) ===
After the war, Francis de Noyelle worked for the Ministry of Foreign Affairs, as an administrator in the Asia-Oceania Division (1946–1948).

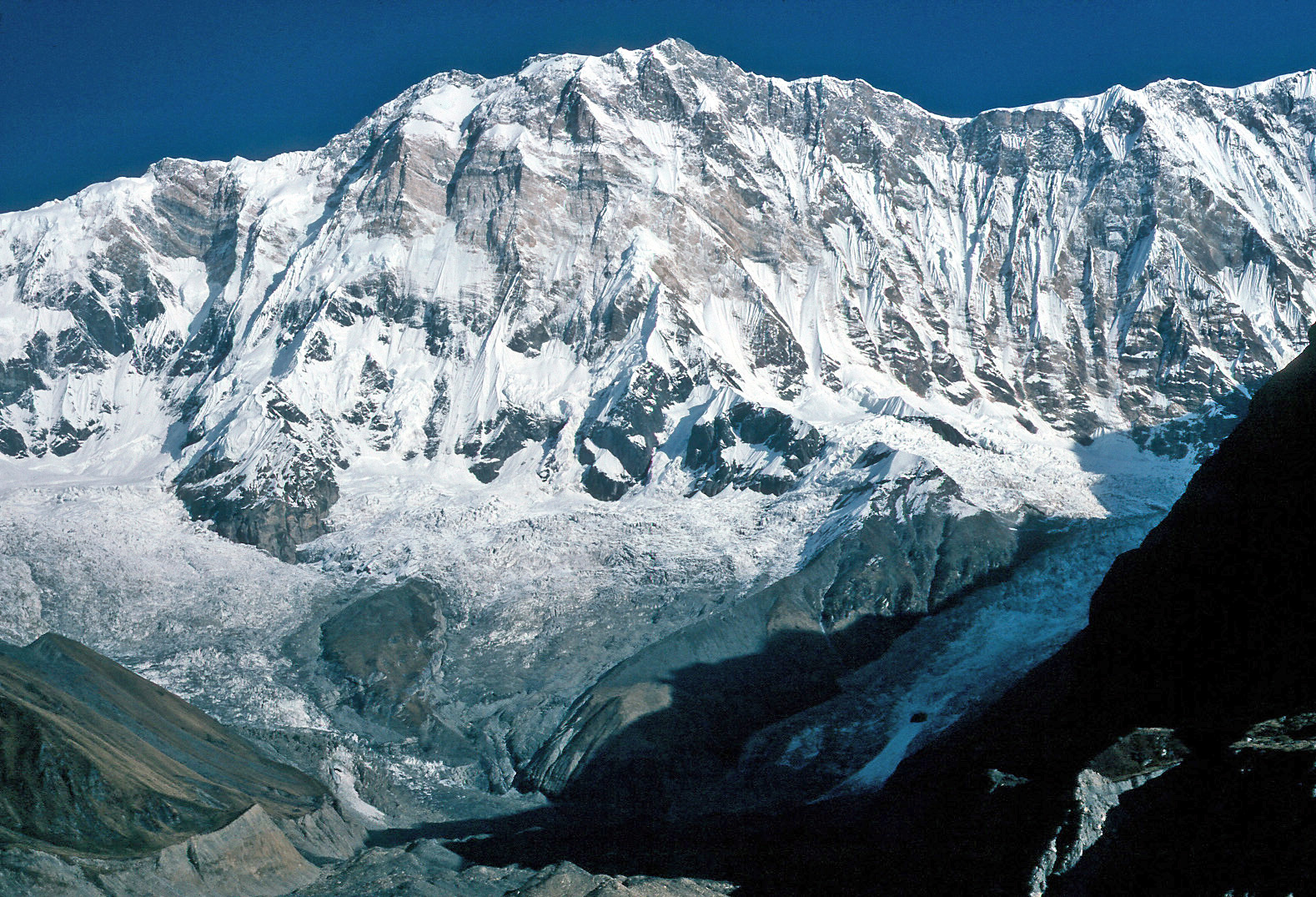
The south face of Annapurna.

Then second secretary at the New Delhi embassy since 1948, he spent three days scouting Nepal in 1949, with a view to a possible French expedition to the Himalayas. After negotiating with the Nepalese authorities to obtain the necessary authorizations, he took part, as liaison officer, in the 1950 French Annapurna expedition led by Maurice Herzog, which successfully climbed Annapurna, the first of the world's fourteen 8,000-meter peaks. His mission was to facilitate the transfer of equipment, recruit Nepalese porters and obtain weather reports. He took part in the ascent, but went no further than the second camp, located at an altitude of 5,600 m. During the ascent, he was the only one to try out an oxygen mask, for medical purposes only. Alongside the expedition's cinematographer Marcel Ichac, Francis de Noyelle also shot Super 8 footage of the climb, (Note: Maurice Herzog was also in possession of a camera during the ascent, but lost it in a crevasse on the way back down.) recording almost 40 minutes of footage. On their return to France, Francis de Noyelle and his mountaineering companions were received at the Salle Pleyel (8th arrondissement of Paris) and then at the Élysée Palace to celebrate their feat; the President of the Republic Vincent Auriol, five ministers and all the personalities of sport and mountaineering were present.

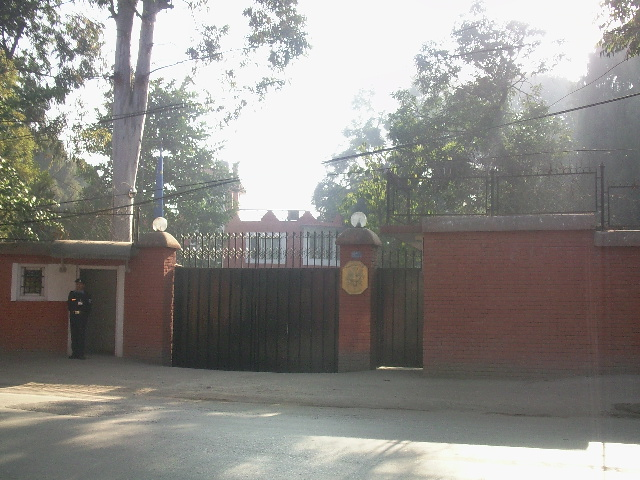
The French Embassy in Nepal.

After the expedition, he joined the press department at headquarters devoted to American issues. Two years later, in 1952, he joined the Embassy in Czechoslovakia, where he was appointed Second, then First Secretary. In 1955, he was appointed Deputy Chief of Staff at the French General Residence in Morocco. He remained in Rabat until 1958 when he was appointed First Secretary of the Embassy. He returned to work at headquarters, more specifically in the section of the economic affairs department specializing in issues relating to the African continent. In 1966, he left for Ottawa, where he served as a Counselor at the French Embassy in Canada until 1969 when he joined the Mail and Pouch Service at headquarters. He was promoted to deputy director of this department in 1971. Francis de Noyelle was appointed Senior Defense Official in 1978. After writing an end-of-mission report for the Ministry, he was appointed Ambassador to Nepal on September 10, 1980, replacing François de Testa. His term of office in Nepal was due to expire on March 4, 1984, but he was replaced on February 15 by Lionel de Warren and retired the following year.

=== Retirement and end of life (1985-2017) ===
After his retirement, Francis de Noyelle worked for the French Red Cross for four years (1985–1989). At the same time, he was appointed assessor judge on the Refugee Appeals Board (1986–1998).

In 2000, he took part in the celebration of the fiftieth anniversary of the French ascent of Annapurna.

The last survivor of his Himalayan expedition, Francis de Noyelle died on March 30, 2017, at the age of 97. His funeral was held on April 3 at the Protestant Temple de l'Étoile (17th arrondissement of Paris).

=== Private life and community involvement ===
From an early age, Francis de Noyelle's passions were tennis and skiing, two sports he practiced until the end of his life - when he was 85 and 90 respectively.

His wife Odette-Juliette, born Petit-Delrieu on October 14, 1920, in Strasbourg (Bas-Rhin) and died on December 9, 2009, was also a diplomat. Together, they had three children: Luc, Guy and Marc. They lived in Paris and spent part of the year in their chalet in Saint-Nicolas-de-Véroce (Saint-Gervais-les-Bains, Haute-Savoie).

=== Private life and community involvement ===
From an early age, Francis de Noyelle's passions were tennis and skiing, two sports he practiced until the end of his life - when he was 85 and 90 respectively.

His wife Odette-Juliette, born Petit-Delrieu on October 14, 1920, in Strasbourg (Bas-Rhin) and died on December 9, 2009, was also a diplomat. Together, they had three children: Luc, Guy and Marc. They lived in Paris15 and spent part of the year in their chalet in Saint-Nicolas-de-Véroce (Saint-Gervais-les-Bains, Haute-Savoie).

He is a member of the Société des explorateurs français, the Cercle du mardi and the scientific committee of the Fédération française des clubs alpins et de montagne (FFCAM). As a member of the FFCAM, he was instrumental in setting up the International Mountain Museum in the Pokhara valley.

== Awards ==
=== Honors ===

Chevalier de la Légion d'honneur (1966 decree).

Military Medal.

Ordre national du Mérite.

Croix de guerre 1939–1945

French Resistance Medal (decree of September 6, 1945)

Chevalier de l'ordre Protestant de Saint-Jean

=== Prix ===
- Prix Virginie-Hériot (1950)

== See also ==
- Maurice Herzog

== Bibliography ==
- Herzog, Maurice (2010). Annapurna, premier 8000. Paris: Arthaud. ISBN 978-2-08-125076-5.
- Kershaw, Alex (2015). Avenue of Spies: A True Story of Terror, Espionage, and One American Family's Heroic Resistance in Nazi-Occupied Paris. Crown/Archetype. ISBN 978-0-8041-4005-8.
- Lafitte, Jacques; Taylor, Stephen (2003). Who's Who in France: Dictionnaire biographique de personnalités françaises vivant en France, dans les territoires d'Outre-Mer ou à l'étranger, et de personnalités étrangères résidant en France. Jacques Lafitte. ISBN 2-85784-042-X.
- Roberts, David (2013). True Summit: What Happened on the Legendary Ascent on Annapurna. Simon and Schuster. ISBN 978-1-4767-3787-4.
