= Hadaka =

Hadaka may refer to:

- Hadaka Matsuri, type of Japanese festival in which participants wear a minimum amount of clothing
- Hadaka no Kokoro, album recorded by female Japanese pop artist Watanabe Misato
- Hadaka no Rallizes, reclusive Japanese psychedelic noise band
- Hadaka no Shōnen, TV Asahi cooking program
- Hadaka no taiyo, 1958 Japanese film directed by Miyoji Ieki
