= Gaston Rébuffat =

French alpinist, mountain guide, and author

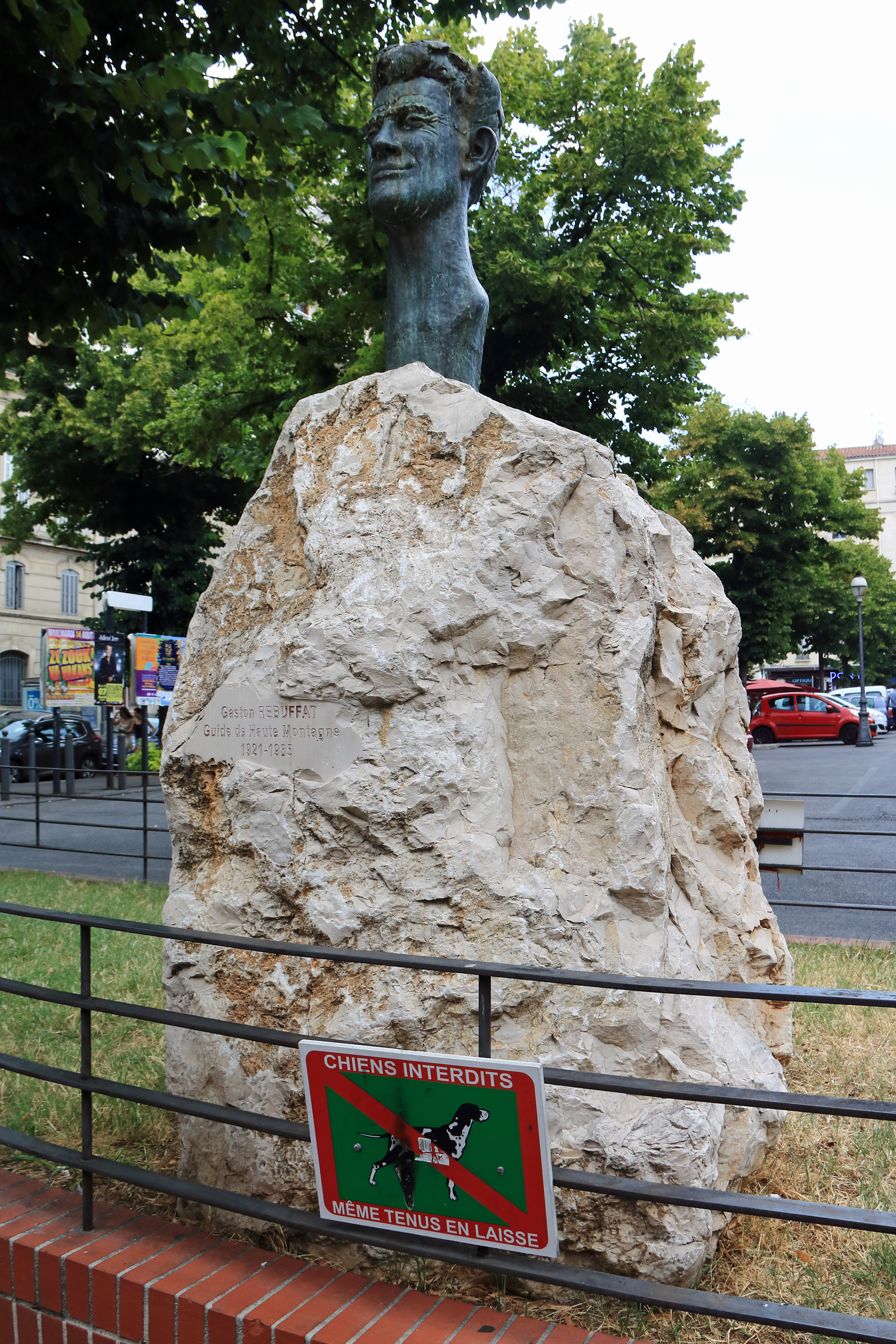
Bust of Gaston Rébuffat in Marseilles, France

Gaston Rébuffat (French pronunciation: [ɡastɔ̃ ʁebyfa]; 7 May 1921, Marseille – 31 May 1985, Paris) was a French alpinist, mountain guide, and author. He is well known as a member of the first expedition to summit Annapurna 1 in 1950 and the first man to climb all six of the great north faces of the Alps. In 1984, he was made an officer in the French Legion of Honour for his service as a mountaineering instructor for the French military. At the age of 64, Gaston Rébuffat died of cancer in Paris, France. The rock-climbing technique, the "Gaston", was named after him. A photo of Rébuffat atop the Aiguille du Roc in the French Alps is on the Voyager Golden Records.

== Early life ==
Gaston Rébuffat was born on 7 May 1921 in Marseilles, France. He began climbing at the age of 14 in the Calanques near Marseilles. At the age of 16, he became a member of the Club Alpin Français (French Alpine Club), where he was introduced to high altitude mountaineering. There he met Lionel Terray, a French mountaineer who would join Rébuffat on the 1950 Annapurna ascent. He later moved to Chamonix, France and became a member of the Compagnie des Guides de Chamonix. He soon began climbing in the Alps, where he would spend much of his career.

== Climbing career ==
=== Instructor and guide ===
During World War II, Gaston Rébuffat attended Jeunesse et Montagne, a French youth training organization. He graduated in 1942, earning his mountain guide certification at the age of 21, despite the minimum age for certification being 23. He continued as an instructor for Jeunesse et Montagne, until, in 1944, he became an instructor for the French National Ski and Mountaineering School (ENSA) as well as the High Mountain Military School, where he served as a mountaineering instructor for several years, eventually earning him the Légion d'Honneur.

After some time as an instructor, Rébuffat wanted to spend more time as a guide. He stated in his 1954 work Starlight and Storm: "Each winter I found myself impatiently awaiting July. At last, the day would come for departure to Ailefroide or Chamonix. There I would spend a few days on the tops, only to return and wait for another year. Then one day, deciding that I must live among the mountains, I became a guide." In 1945, Rébuffat left his position at the ENSA to become a mountain guide in the Alps. Throughout his career, he guided many climbers and mountaineers, both new and experienced, up the mountains of the Alps. By the 1950s he was known as one of the foremost experts on the Mont Blanc Massif in the Alps, where he had set several routes himself.

=== Alpine north faces ===
One of Rébuffat's most famous accomplishments is his ascent of the six great north faces of the Alps. He began planning for his first ascent, the Grandes Jorasses, in the summer of 1938 at the age of 17, shortly after the first ascent of the mountain's north face by Italian mountaineers Riccardo Cassin, Gino Esposito, and Ugo Tizzoni. In 1943, Rébuffat made his first attempt at the summit but was not successful due to poor weather conditions. He returned to the mountain in July 1945 and successfully climbed the north face with the assistance of Édouard Frendo. In August 1949, he attempted and successfully completed an ascent of the northeast face of Piz Badile, during which he acted as a mountain guide for an amateur mountaineer. By this time, Rébuffat was among a handful of elite mountaineers to have climbed these faces. This led to his selection as one of the principal members of the 1950 Annapurna expedition. Over the next several years, he guided mountaineers, both new and experienced, up the remaining great north faces, the Petit Dru, the Matterhorn, the Cima Grande di Lavaredo, and the Eiger.

=== Annapurna ===
In 1950, Gaston Rébuffat was part of an expedition to summit Annapurna 1, the tallest point of the Annapurna Massif in the Himalayas and the tenth-highest peak in the world. The expedition was led by Maurice Herzog and also included French mountaineers Louis Lachenal and Lionel Terray. The expedition began in March 1950, with the actual ascent of Annapurna 1 beginning in May. During the ascent, a base camp and four intermediate camps were set up, with the highest being about 7400 meters in altitude. The summit itself was completed on 3 June 1950 by Herzog and Lachenal. While traveling down from the top camp, the four mountaineers were unable to locate the next camp and were forced to spend the night in a crevasse. All members survived the expedition, but Herzog and Lachenal later lost several fingers and toes due to severe frostbite. Although Rébuffat did not summit the mountain, he was instrumental in ensuring his injured colleagues returned safely. The expedition is known to be the first ascent of any mountain over 8000 meters and was the highest mountain climb ever at the time.

== Writing ==
Known for his lyrical writing and his ability to convey not only the dangers of mountaineering but the pure exaltation of the climb, Rébuffat authored several books, many of which he published in his own publishing house. His most famous written work is Étoiles et Tempêtes (Starlight and Storm), first published in French in 1954, and in English in 1956.

- Starlight and Storm: The Ascent of six great North Faces of the Alps, J.M. Dent, London 1956.
- Mont Blanc To Everest, Thames & Hudson, 1956. Translated from the French Du Mont Blanc a l'Himalaya 1955.
- Calanques (with Gabriel M. Ollive), Arthaud, Paris 1957.
- On Ice and Snow and Rock, Nicholas Kaye Ltd 1963 translated from the 1959 French Edition published by EGI. ISBN 0-19-519149-8
- Un Guide Raconte, Hachette, Paris, 1964.
- Men and the Matterhorn, Oxford University Press 1967.
- Between Heaven and Earth (with Pierre Tairraz). Kaye and W, 1970. ISBN 0-7182-0513-8
- Les Horizons Gagnés, Éditions Denoël, 1975.
- La Montagne Est Mon Domaine, Éditions Hoëbeke, Paris 1994.
- The Mont Blanc Massif: The Hundred Finest Routes. Bâton Wicks, 2005. ISBN 1-898573-69-7

== Filmography ==
Rébuffat produced three colour films depicting himself and others climbing in the Alps. These are a testament to his skill as a climber, and his love of the mountains. Étoiles et Tempêtes won the Grand Prix at the Trento Film Festival in Trento, Italy.

- Flammes de Pierres 1953.
- Étoiles et Tempêtes with Maurice Baquet and Georges Tairraz 1955
- Entre Terre et Ciel with Pierre Tairraz 1960-61
- Les Horizons Gagnés with René Vernadet 1974

Rébuffat also was second unit director on the Walt Disney mountain film Third Man on the Mountain.
