= Archimède le clochard =

1959 film

- Directed by: Gilles Grangier
- Written by: Michel Audiard; Gilles Grangier; Albert Valentin
- Produced by: Jean-Paul Guibert
- Starring: Jean Gabin
- Cinematography: Louis Page
- Edited by: Jacqueline Thiédot
- Music by: Jean Prodromidès
- Distributed by: Cinédis
- Release date: 1959
- Running time: 84 minutes
- Country: France
- Language: French

Archimède le clochard is a 1959 French comedy-drama film directed by Gilles Grangier. It is also known as The Magnificent Tramp. The film was entered into the 9th Berlin International Film Festival, where Jean Gabin won the Silver Bear for Best Actor.

== Plot ==
A sophisticated tramp lives during summer in a half-finished construction site. Because he would rather not be cold in the winter, he decides to get imprisoned on time. Therefore, he demolishes a bar but he is only incarcerated for a single week. He promises he will find a way to come back.

== Cast ==
- Jean Gabin as Joseph Hugues Guillaume Boutier-Blainville aka Archimède
- Paul Frankeur as Monsieur Grégoire, the first inn keeper
- Darry Cowl as Arsène, the second inn keeper
- Bernard Blier as Monsieur Pichon, the new inn keeper
- Dora Doll as Madame Pichon
- Gaby Basset as Mme Grégoire
- Sacha Briquet as Jean-Loup, the English guest
- Guy Decomble as the RATP station manager
- Albert Dinan as the caterer
- Noël Roquevert as Capitaine Brossard, the retired commander
- Julien Carette as Félix, le clochard aux chiens
- Paul Frankeur as M. Grégoire, l'ancien patron
- Jacqueline Maillan as Madame Marjorie
