= The Link and the Chain =

1963 film

- Directed by: Jacques Ertaud; Bernard Gorki
- Produced by: Paul de Roubaix
- Release date: 1963
- Running time: 80 minutes
- Country: France
- Language: French

The Link and the Chain (French: Le Maillon et la chaîne) is a 1963 French documentary film about life in the Loyalty Islands, directed by Jacques Ertaud. It was nominated for an Academy Award for Best Documentary Feature. The film was preserved by the Academy Film Archive in 2015.
