= Stars at Noon (1959 film) =

1959 film

- Film poster
- Directed by: Jacques Ertaud; Marcel Ichac
- Written by: Gérard Herzog; Marcel Ichac
- Produced by: Marcel Ichac
- Starring: Roger Blin
- Cinematography: Georges Strouvé; René Vernadet
- Edited by: Pierre Gillette
- Release date: June 1959
- Running time: 78 minutes
- Country: France
- Language: French

Stars at Noon (French: Les étoiles de midi) is a 1959 French mountaineering film directed by Jacques Ertaud and Marcel Ichac. It was entered into the 9th Berlin International Film Festival.

== Cast ==
- Roger Blin
- Pierre Danny
- Pierre Rousseau
- Lionel Terray
