= Pointe Lachenal =

- Location within France

Highest point
- Elevation: 3,613 m (11,854 ft)
- Coordinates: 45°51′55″N 06°53′42″E

Geography
- Location: Haute-Savoie, Rhône-Alpes, France
- Parent range: Mont Blanc Massif

Pointe Lachenal is a mountain in the Mont Blanc massif in the French Alps.

It is located above the Glacier du Géant, under the East face of Mont Blanc du Tacul and opposite the Aiguille du Midi. The mountain is a mix of snow and rock, and has many rock climbing routes. Popular alpine tours such as the north face climb of Mont-Blanc lead over the crest of the Pointe Lachenal. It was named after French alpinist and guide Louis Lachenal (1921-1955).

In the Annapurna Massif we find the mountain Lachenal Peak (7.140 m), also named after the same guide.
