= Jean Couzy =

French mountain climber (1923–1958)

Jean Couzy (German pronunciation: [ʒɑ̃ kuzi]; 9 July 1923 – 2 November 1958) was a French mountaineer. He studied aeronautical engineering at the École Polytechnique. At age 27, he was a member of Maurice Herzog's 1950 expedition to Annapurna. Prior to this, his usual climbing partner was Marcel Schatz, another member of the expedition. On the 1955 French Makalu expedition Couzy made the first ascent of Makalu with Lionel Terray on 15 May 1955.

In the Alps, Jean Couzy was the first to ascend the following routes:

- Aiguille de l'M near Chamonix, a classical Severe (D) route named "la Couzy"
- An Extremely Severe (ED) route on the north-west face of the Olan.
- The Couzy route on the North Face of the Cima Ovest, Dolomites.

On 2 November 1958 he was hit on the head by a rock fall in the southern face of crête des Bergers (southern rim of the Bure plateau) in the Dévoluy Mountains. He is buried in Montmaur cemetery, at the foot of the mountain where his accident occurred.
