= Miyoji Ieki =

Japanese film director

- Born: 10 September 1911; Chiyoda, Japan
- Died: 22 February 1976 (aged 64)
- Occupations: Film director, Screenwriter
- Years active: 1940–1974

Miyoji Ieki (家城巳代治, Ieki Miyoji; 10 September 1911 – 22 February 1976) was a Japanese film director and screenwriter. He often made adolescents the protagonists of his films, which addressed political themes through personal drama. His most noted works include Stepbrothers (1957) and Naked Sun (1958).

== Life ==
After graduating from the University of Tokyo, Miyoji Ieki joined the Shochiku film studios in 1940, where he became an assistant of Heinosuke Gosho and Minoru Shibuya, before debuting as director with Torrent (Gekiryū) in 1944. After World War II, he directed youth films and romances like The Sad Whistle (1949), before being expelled by Shochiku together with other filmmakers as a communist sympathiser during the Red Purge.

In the following years, Ieki, working for independent companies, directed his most notable films, including Beyond the Clouds (1953), a portrait of young kamikaze pilots, Sisters (1955), Stepbrothers (1957), an account of the ongoing conflicts in a military family, and Naked Sun (1958), a youth drama set among railway workers. Stepbrothers received the Grand Prix at the 1958 Karlovy Vary International Film Festival. Naked Sun also marked the beginning of Ieki's association with Toei studios, which lasted until 1965. Films of this era and later years include A Pebble by the Wayside (1964), an adaptation of the novel by Yūzō Yamamoto, and The Only Child (1969).

== Selected filmography ==
- 1944: Torrent (Gekiryū)
- 1949: The Sad Whistle (Kanashiki kuchibue)
- 1953: Beyond the Clouds (Kumo nagaruru hate ni)
- 1955: Sisters (Shimai)
- 1957: Stepbrothers (Ibo kyōdai)
- 1958: Naked Sun (Hadaka no taiyō)
- 1964: A Pebble by the Wayside a.k.a. Wayside Pebble (Robō no ishi)
- 1969: The Only Child aka Only Child (Hitorikko)
