= Stepbrothers (1957 film) =

1957 Japanese film

- Film poster
- Directed by: Miyoji Ieki
- Screenplay by: Nobuyoshi Terada; Yoshikata Yoda; Torahiko Tamiya (novel)
- Produced by: Seiichiro Sakaeda
- Starring: Rentarō Mikuni; Kinuyo Tanaka; Chōko Iida
- Cinematography: Yoshio Miyajima
- Edited by: Umeko Nimazaki
- Music by: Yasushi Akutagawa
- Production company: Dokuritsu Eiga
- Release date: 25 June 1957 (Japan)
- Running time: 110 minutes
- Country: Japan
- Language: Japanese

Stepbrothers (Japanese: 異母兄弟, Hepburn: Ibo kyōdai) is a 1957 Japanese drama film directed by Miyoji Ieki. The screenplay by Nobuyoshi Terada and Yoshikata Yoda is based on the novel of the same name by Torahiko Tamiya.

== Plot ==
In 1921, Rie, daughter of a simple carriage driver, is introduced as a maid into the household of tyrannic company commander Kito, his two sons Ichiroji and Gojiro and his sickly wife. Following his wife's death, Kito is forced to marry Rie, who expects a child after he raped her. Rie gives birth to a son, Yoshitoshi, and later to a second son, Tomohide, who are both treated with disdain by Kito and his sons from his previous marriage. Also, she and her sons are forced to live in a small, separate room in the Kito family mansion.

One after another, Kito's sons follow in the family tradition and start a military career, although Yoshitoshi only reluctantly so. When Kito learns that Tomohide, still a student, and young maid Haru have fallen in love, he furiously fires Haru and sends Tomohide to his former nanny Masu. Masu tells Tomohide that Haru was sold into prostitution by her family, and Tomohide runs away from her home, his whereabouts remaining unknown.

One year after the end of World War II, Kito and Rie live alone in the deserted family mansion. When Tomohide, the sole survivor of the sons, returns home, Kito wants to throw him out again, but Rie, finally talking back to him after almost 30 years of obedience, tells Kito that the house is also hers and her son's.

== Cast ==
- Rentarō Mikuni as Hantaro Kito
- Kinuyo Tanaka as Rie
- Chōko Iida as Masu
- Shoichi Nishida as Ichiroji (as adult)
- Hiroshi Kondo as Gojiro (as adult)
- Shinji Nanbara as Yoshitoshi (as adult)
- Katsuo Nakamura as Tomohide (as adult)
- Hizuru Takachiho as Haru
- Nakajiro Tomita as Sagami
- Ton Shimata as Ota

== Reception ==
Stepbrothers received the Grand Prix at the 1958 Karlovy Vary International Film Festival, sharing it with And Quiet Flows the Don. Kinuyo Tanaka was awarded the 1957 Mainichi Film Award for Best Supporting Actress and co-scenarist Yoshikata Yoda the Mainichi Film Award for Best Screenplay.

In his Critical Handbook of Japanese Film Directors, film scholar Alexander Jacoby rated Stepbrothers as "perhaps Ieki's best film", calling it "a film of both political sophistication and emotional intensity".
