= Anneaux d'or =

1959 film

- Directed by: René Vautier
- Written by: Sassi Rejeb
- Starring: Claudia Cardinale
- Release date: 1959
- Running time: 14 minutes
- Countries: France; Tunisia

Anneaux d'or is a 1959 French Tunisian 14-minute short film directed by René Vautier and written by Sassi Rjeb. It stars Claudia Cardinale. The film won the Best Short Film Suitable for Young People at the Berlin International Film Festival.
