= Lete, Nepal =

Village in Mustang, Nepal

Lete लेते
- Village development committee
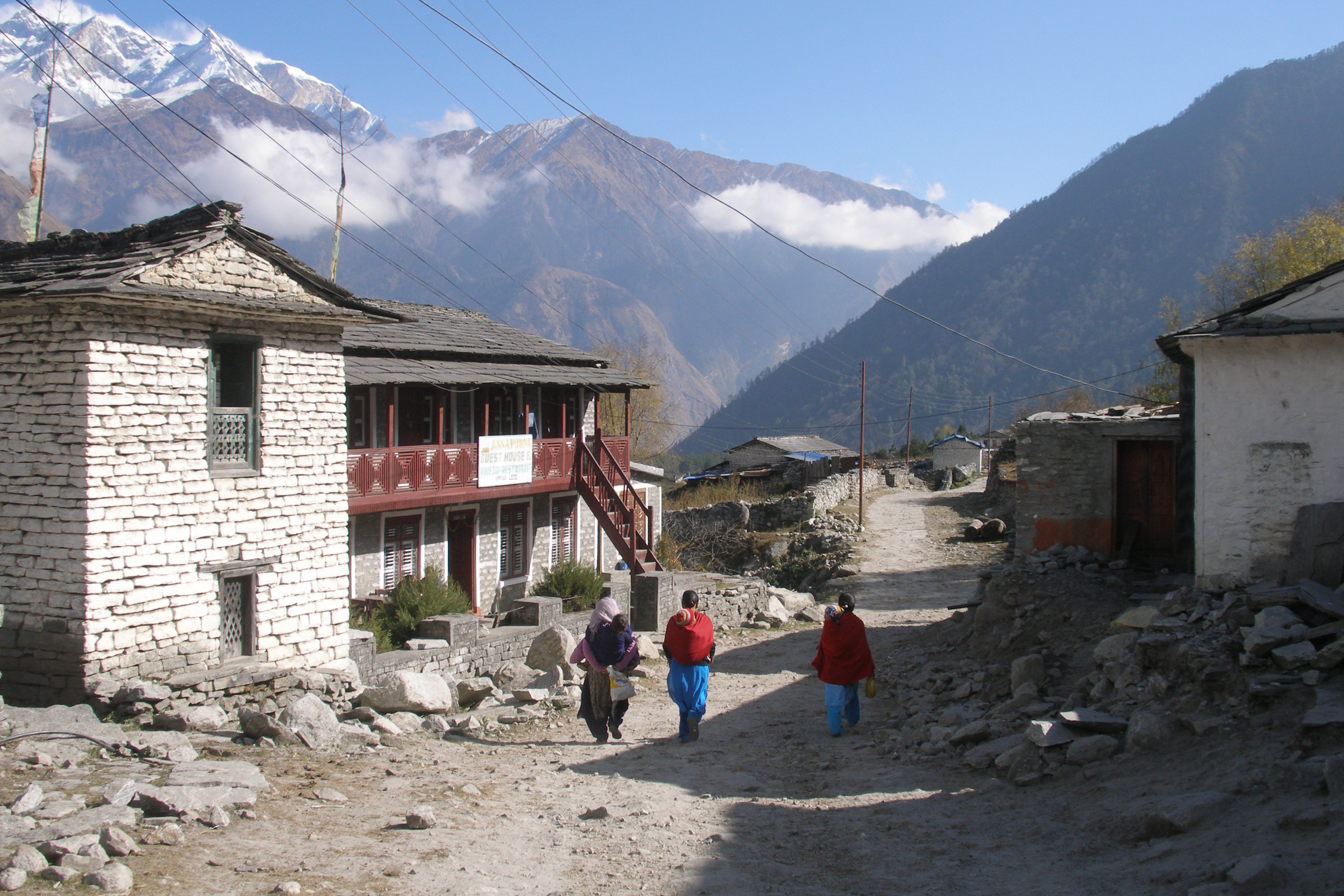
- Lete in 2007

- Location in Nepal Lete (Nepal)
- Coordinates: 28°37′12″N 83°36′0″E
- Country: Nepal
- Zone: Dhawalagiri Zone
- District: Mustang District

Population (1991)
  - Total: 914
- Time zone: UTC+5:45 (Nepal Time)

Lete is a village development committee in Mustang District in the Dhawalagiri Zone of northern Nepal. At the time of the 1991 Nepal census it had a population of 914 people living in 189 individual households. It is a scenic village surrounded by Dhawalagiri, Annapurna and Nilgiri. This village is governed by chairman the, Ama-Samuha, and other members.

== Climate ==
Climate data for Lete, elevation 2,384 m (7,822 ft)
| Month | Jan | Feb | Mar | Apr | May | Jun | Jul | Aug | Sep | Oct | Nov | Dec | Year |
|---|---|---|---|---|---|---|---|---|---|---|---|---|---|
| Mean daily maximum °C (°F) | 10.7 (51.3) | 12.1 (53.8) | 16.6 (61.9) | 21.3 (70.3) | 23.3 (73.9) | 23.6 (74.5) | 21.7 (71.1) | 21.5 (70.7) | 20.9 (69.6) | 19.1 (66.4) | 14.6 (58.3) | 11.8 (53.2) | 18.1 (64.6) |
| Mean daily minimum °C (°F) | −0.2 (31.6) | 0.9 (33.6) | 4.8 (40.6) | 7.7 (45.9) | 10.0 (50.0) | 12.9 (55.2) | 13.7 (56.7) | 13.4 (56.1) | 11.9 (53.4) | 8.0 (46.4) | 3.2 (37.8) | 0.6 (33.1) | 7.2 (45.0) |
| Average precipitation mm (inches) | 29.5 (1.16) | 55.9 (2.20) | 97.6 (3.84) | 105.4 (4.15) | 120.5 (4.74) | 162.4 (6.39) | 247.6 (9.75) | 240.4 (9.46) | 140.9 (5.55) | 56.2 (2.21) | 15.0 (0.59) | 16.5 (0.65) | 1,287.9 (50.69) |
Source 1: Australian National University
Source 2: Japan International Cooperation Agency (precipitation)
