= Naked Sun (film) =

1958 film

- Poster
- Directed by: Miyoji Ieki
- Written by: Kazutoshi Himuro; Kaneto Shindo
- Starring: Shinjirō Ehara
- Cinematography: Yoshio Miyajima
- Release date: 1 October 1958 (Japan)
- Running time: 85 minutes
- Country: Japan
- Language: Japanese

Naked Sun (Japanese: 裸の太陽, Hepburn: Hadaka no taiyō) is a 1958 Japanese drama film directed by Miyoji Ieki. It was entered into the 9th Berlin International Film Festival.

== Cast ==
- Shinjirō Ehara
- Michiko Hoshi
- Tatsuya Nakadai as Jirō Maeda
- Hitomi Nakahara
- Satomi Oka
- Toshio Takahara as Kenzō Sakiyama
- Junikichi Orimoto as takeshi Kimura
