= Maurice Herzog =

French mountaineer and politician

- Herzog with frostbitten fingers after reaching the summit of Annapura in 1950

Secretary of State for Youth Affairs and Sports
- In office 1958–1966
- President: Charles de Gaulle
- Prime Minister: Georges Pompidou
- Preceded by: René Billères
- Succeeded by: François Missoffe

Mayor of Chamonix
- In office 1968–1977

Personal details
- Born: 15 January 1919 Lyon, France
- Died: 13 December 2012 (aged 93) Neuilly-sur-Seine, Île-de-France, France
- Party: Union for the New Republic (UNR); Union of Democrats for the Republic (UDR)
- Spouse(s): Marie-Pierre de Cossé-Brissac (1964–1976); Élisabeth Gamper (1976)
- Children: Laurent, Félicité, Mathias, Sébastien
- Education: HEC Paris
- Occupation: Mountaineer

Maurice André Raymond Herzog (French pronunciation: [mɔʁis ɑ̃dʁe ʁemɔ̃ ɛʁzɔɡ]; 15 January 1919 – 13 December 2012) was a French mountaineer and administrator who was born in Lyon, France. He led the 1950 French Annapurna expedition that first climbed a peak over 8000m, Annapurna, in 1950, and reached the summit with Louis Lachenal. Upon his return, he wrote a best-selling book about the expedition, Annapurna.

== Ascent of Annapurna I ==
On 3 June 1950, Herzog and Louis Lachenal became the first climbers in history to climb a peak over 8000m when, on the 1950 French Annapurna expedition, they summited the Himalayan mountain Annapurna I, the 10th-highest mountain in the world. The ascent was all the more remarkable because the peak was explored, reconnoitered and climbed all within one season; and was climbed without the use of supplemental oxygen. It is also the only 8000 meter summit that was reached at the first attempt. Herzog was awarded the 1950 Gold Medal of the Société de Géographie.

The event caused a huge sensation that was only matched when Everest was summited in 1953 by Edmund Hillary and Tenzing Norgay.

The two-week retreat from the peak proved very challenging. Both climbers had opted for light boots for the summit dash. This, combined with Herzog losing his gloves near the summit and a night spent bivouacked in a crevasse on the descent with one sleeping bag for four climbers (Lachenal, Gaston Rébuffat, Lionel Terray, and Herzog) resulted in severe frostbite, with consequent gangrene requiring the expedition doctor to perform emergency amputations in the field. Both summit climbers lost all of their toes and Herzog most of his fingers.

Annapurna I was not climbed again until 1970, when the French north face route was climbed by a British Army expedition led by Colonel Henry Day, simultaneously with an ascent of the south face by an expedition led by British climber Chris Bonington. The mountain's fourth ascent was not until 1977.

=== Book ===
Herzog's account of the expedition was published in French in 1951. It was then translated to English by Nea Morin and Janet Adam Smith in 1952. The book was dictated by Herzog in an American Hospital in Neuilly, France.

The book has sold over 11 million copies as of 2000, more than any other mountaineering title. It is considered to be one of the most successful mountaineering books of all time and was ranked 77th in Sports Illustrated list of the top 100 sports books ever written. In the United States it was published as a Book-of-the-Month Club selection which increased its circulation and popularity.

=== Conflicting accounts ===
Some aspects of Herzog's account of the summit day have been called into question with the publication of other members' accounts of the expedition, most significantly by a biography of Gaston Rébuffat and the posthumous publication of Lachenal's contemporaneous journals in 1996.

Before he died, Lachenal told another climber, Jean-Pierre Payot, that he was "fed up with the way [Herzog] used the Annapurna legend to further his career". After the publication of Lachenal's journals in 1996, his son said that Lachenal's conflicting account of the climb had been censored by Herzog. His son also said that Herzog misled readers by portraying Lachenal as "a mere ghost who had to be persuaded to climb the last metres".

The 2000 book True Summit: What Really Happened on the Legendary Ascent of Annapurna by David Roberts gives one view of the controversy.

== Political career ==
In 1958, Herzog became French minister for youth and sport under Charles de Gaulle. In 1968, he was elected mayor of Chamonix. In the 1960s and 1970s, he was a deputy to the National Assembly as a member of Union for the New Republic and then Union of Democrats for the Republic, both Gaullist political parties.

Herzog was a member of the International Olympic Committee for 25 years starting in 1970. In 1995 he was made an honorary member. He was International Olympic Committee Chief of Protocol from 1975 to 1978 and was a member of several commissions.

== Personal life ==
Maurice was born in 1919 in Lyon, France, and was the eldest of eight children. His passion from the mountains was spurred from spending time at a chalet at the foot of the Bossons glacier that his family owned. His father, Robert Herzog, was also an avid alpinist. He studied at HEC Paris where be received his baccalaureate and did a postgraduate course in business studies which he completed in 1944. He fought in the second world war in the French Alps with the Armée Secrète and Francs-Tireurs et Partisans. After the war, Herzog worked for Kléber-Colombes, a tyre manufacturing company.

Herzog married Marie-Pierre de Cossé-Brissac in 1964. They had two children, Laurent and Felicité, and divorced in 1976. He remarried to Elisabeth Gamper in 1976 and had two more children, Sébastien and Mathias.

In 2011, he was awarded the Grand Cross of the Legion of Honor, France's highest civilian honor.

Herzog died in 2012, aged 93. In a tribute, President François Hollande of France said Mr. Herzog's climb was "engraved enduringly in our collective memory."

== Publications ==
- Herzog, Maurice (1952). Annapurna, First Conquest of an 8000-meter Peak. Translated by Nea Morin; Janet Smith. New York, New York: E. P. Dutton & Co. Library of Congress Catalog Card No: 52-12154. (first American printing)
- Herzog, Maurice (1997). Annapurna. New York, New York: The Lyons Press. ISBN 1-55821-549-2. (current American edition)

== See also ==
- Francis de Noyelle
