= The White Tower (Ullman novel) =

1945 novel by James Ramsey Ullman

- First edition
- Author: James Ramsey Ullman
- Language: English
- Publisher: J. B. Lippincott Company
- Publication date: 1945
- Publication place: United States
- Media type: Print (Hardback & Paperback)
- Pages: 479 pp

The White Tower is a 1945 novel by James Ramsey Ullman. It was the fourth best-selling novel in the US in 1945 and was reprinted as an Armed Services Edition.

It was filmed in 1950 under the direction of Ted Tetzlaff and starred Glenn Ford, Alida Valli, Claude Rains, Lloyd Bridges, Cedric Hardwicke, and Oskar Homolka.

== 1955 radio adaptation ==
ABC Weekly 26 Feb 1955

It was adapted into a 1955 Australian radio serial by Morris West.

== See also ==
- List of bestselling novels in the United States
