= James Ramsey Ullman =

American novelist (1907–1971)

James Ramsey Ullman (August 21, 1907 – June 20, 1971) was an American writer and mountaineer. He was born in New York City. He was not a "high end" climber, but his writing made him an honorary member of that circle. Most of his books were about mountaineering and geography.

His works include Banner in the Sky, which was a book based on the true story of the first climbing of the Matterhorn (it was filmed in Switzerland as Third Man on the Mountain), and The White Tower (which would star Glenn Ford and Lloyd Bridges).

In his late 20's, after a discouraging lack of success as a theatrical producer, in New York, he undertook a journey from Lima to the Atlantic. He wrote about that journey in his book The Other Side of the Mountain: An Escape to the Amazon, which is entertaining and informative on several levels.

High Conquest was the first of nine books for the J.B. Lippincott Company, coming out in 1941, followed by The White Tower, River of The Sun, Windom's Way, and Banner in the Sky, a 1955 Newbery Honor book. All of these titles became small motion pictures.

Ullman was the ghost writer for Tenzing Norgay's 1955 autobiography Man of Everest (originally published as Tiger of the Snows) and for John Harlin's biography Straight Up.

He also wrote the short story "Top Man", a story about mountaineers climbing K3, a mountain in India. The story appears in several anthologies. It was originally published in the Saturday Evening Post in 1940. Issue #35.

Beyond his mountaineering books, he wrote "Where the Bong Tree Grows," an account of a year he spent travelling through some of the most remote islands of the South Pacific. Ullman also wrote a novel about the poet Arthur Rimbaud, The Day on Fire (1958).

He joined the 1963 American Mount Everest expedition as an official historian. On May 1, 1963 Jim Whittaker was the first American to reach the summit with Nawang Gombu, a nephew of Tenzing Norgay. Because of health problems, Ullman had to stay in Kathmandu. His book Americans on Everest: The Official Account of the Ascent was published by J. B. Lippincott Company in 1964 (Library of Congress Catalogue #64-14475).

Ullman died in Boston from cancer on July 5, 1971. His papers, which include an archive regarding Temple Fielding, are at Princeton University.

== Works ==
- Mad Shelley, (1930)
- Is Nothing Sacred? [with Arnold L Schueur, Jr], (1934)
- The Other Side Of The Mountain: An Escape To The Amazon, (1938)
- High Conquest: The Story Of Mountaineering, (1941)
- The White Tower, (1945)
- Kingdom Of Adventure, (1947)
- River Of The Sun, (1951)
- Windom's Way, (1952)
- Sands Of Karakorum, (1953)
- Island Of The Blue Macaws, And Sixteen Other Stories, (1953)
- The Age Of Mountaineering, (1954)
- Banner In The Sky, (1954)
- Tiger Of The Snows (also titled: Man Of Everest) (also titled: Tenzing) with Tenzing Norgay, (1955)
- The Day On Fire, (1958)
- Down The Colorado With Major Powell, (1960)
- Fia Fia: A Novel Of The South Pacific, (1962)
- Where The Bong Tree Grows:...Journey In The South Pacific, (1963)
- Americans On Everest: The Official Account Of The Ascent, (1964)
- Caribbean Here & Now with Al Dinhofer, (1968)
- Straight Up: The Life And Death Of John Harlin, (1968)
- And Not To Yield, (1970)
- Island Below The Wind, (1975)

== Sources ==
- Time Milestones
