= Lionel Terray =

French climber and mountaineer

Personal information
- Nationality: French
- Born: 25 July 1921
- Died: 19 September 1965 (aged 44)

Climbing career
- Type of climber: rock climbing
- First ascents: Makalu

Terray's grave in Chamonix

Lionel Terray (German pronunciation: [ljɔnɛl tɛʁɛ]; 25 July 1921 – 19 September 1965) was a French climber who made many first ascents, including on the 1955 French Makalu expedition in the Himalaya (with Jean Couzy on 15 May 1955) and Cerro Fitz Roy in the Patagonian Andes (with Guido Magnone in 1952).

A climbing guide and ski instructor, Terray was active in mountain combat against Germany during World War II. After the war, he became well known as one of the best Chamonix climbers and guides, noted for his speedy ascents of some of the most notorious climbs in the French, Italian, and Swiss Alps: the Walker Spur of the Grandes Jorasses, the south face of the Aiguille Noire de Peuterey, the north-east face of Piz Badile, and the north face of the Eiger. Terray, frequently with climbing partner Louis Lachenal, broke previous climbing speed records.

Terray was a member of Maurice Herzog's 1950 expedition to the Nepalese Himalayan peak Annapurna, the highest peak climbed at the time, and the first 8000-metre peak climbed (although British climbers George Mallory, Andrew Irvine, George Finch, Geoffrey Bruce, Henry Morshead, Teddy Norton and Howard Somervell had reached higher altitudes on Mount Everest during the 1920s). Terray did not reach the summit of Annapurna, but together with the Sherpa Adjiba he aided summiteers Maurice Herzog and Louis Lachenal down from the mountain. Both Herzog and Lachenal experienced extreme frostbite and subsequently underwent amputations. Despite these events, the French team returned to Paris to huge public acclaim, and Herzog's expedition book Annapurna became an international bestseller.

Terray made the second ascent of the North Face of the Eiger in 1947, with Louis Lachenal. He was also one of the main participants in the great attempt to rescue four climbers trapped on the north face of the Eiger in 1957. This mission forms the subject of Jack Olsen's 1962 book, The Climb Up To Hell, in which Terray's skill and bravery receive special mention.

In the late 1950s and early 1960s, Terray made a number of first ascents in Peru, including the highest unclimbed peak in the central Andes at the time, 6,395-metre (20,981 ft) Huantsan. He also made first ascents of lower but more difficult peaks, including Willka Wiqi, Soray, Tawllirahu, and Chakrarahu/Chacraraju, possibly the hardest peak in the Peruvian Andes and considered unclimbable at the time. One of Terray's finest achievements was the first ascent of 7,710-metre (25,295 ft) Jannu in Nepal in 1962. He also climbed the Nilgiris near Annapurna, and led the successful 1964 first ascent of 3,730-metre (12,240 ft) Mount Huntington, in the Alaska Range, by the northwest ridge.

Terray organised a rescue attempt of two climbers stranded on Mont Blanc in December 1956. For this he was expelled from the Chamonix Guide's Association, which had refused to participate in the rescue from the start on the grounds that the risk to the rescuers would be too great. Due to the fact that no other guides would accompany him, Terray set out with a small team of amateurs. They were turned back on 1 January 1957 either by poor weather or on the understanding that a helicopter would attempt a rescue the following day. Terray was highly critical of the Chamonix Guide Association's inaction when the alarm had first been raised.

Terray was fatally injured from a fall while climbing in the Vercors, south of Grenoble, on 19 September 1965, several years after the publication of his climbing memoir, Conquistadors of the Useless. There were rumours that Terray was functionally illiterate and the book was ghost-written; however in a foreword written by author and climber David Roberts to an English edition, he confirms he found the original manuscript written in Terray's hand which is word for word what was published, dispelling any notion that Terray did not write the book entirely himself.

His grave is in Chamonix, France. A roundabout is named after him in Chamonix, WSW of town.

== Principal expeditions ==
Principal expeditions:

- 1942 - First ascent of the west side of Aiguille Purtcheller.
- 1944 - First to the east-northeast spur of the Pain de Sucre. The first on the north face of the fr:Aiguille des Pélerins and the north of the Peuterey lap with Maurice Herzog.
- 1946 - Spur north of the Droites, with Louis Lachenal, in eight hours. And the north face of Grandes Jorasses.
- 1947 - Third ascent of the north face of Aiguille Verte. The second to climb the northern face of the Eiger with Lachenal.
- 1950 - Lionel Terray on the expedition to Annapurna, the first 8000+m mountain successfully climbed. Terray did not summit but played a rescue role.
- 1952 - First ascent of Fitz Roy (3,405m) in Patagonia. Climb to Aconcagua (6,960m).
- 1954 - Reconnoiter of Makalu in Tibet. First ascents of subsidiary summits Kangchungtse and Chomo Lonzo (7,804m).
- 1955 - Expedition to Makalu, first summit (8,485m), with Jean Couzy.
- 1956 - In Peru, Nevado Chacraraju (6,110m); and Taulliraju (5,830m).
- 1959 - Expedition to Jannu, 7,710 m, stopping at 7,400 m. In 1962, under Terray's direction, success.
- 1962 - First ascent of 7,710-metre (25,295 ft) Jannu in Nepal.
- 1964 - In the Alaskan range, first ascent of Mount Huntington (3,731m).

== Bibliography ==
- Terray, Lionel (1961). Les Conquérants de l'inutile. France: Gallimard. ASIN B000HJRAVQ.
- Terray, Lionel (2000). Conquistadors of the Useless. Translated by Geoffrey Sutton. Baton Wicks Publications; New Ed. ISBN 1-898573-38-7.
- Terray, Lionel; Franco, Jean (1965). Bataille pour Le Jannu. France: Gallimard. ISBN 2-07-010203-3.
