= Louis Lachenal =

20th-century French mountain climber

- Lachenal c. 1950
- Born: 17 July 1921; Annecy, Haute-Savoie, France
- Died: 25 November 1955 (aged 34); Vallée Blanche, Mer de Glace, France
- Occupation: Mountaineer
- Known for: First ascent of Annapurna I

Louis Lachenal (17 July 1921 – 25 November 1955), a French climber born in Annecy, Haute-Savoie, was one of the first two mountaineers to climb a summit of more than 8,000 meters.

== Annapurna ==
On 3 June 1950 on the 1950 French Annapurna expedition, along with Maurice Herzog, he reached the summit of Annapurna I in Nepal at a height of 8,091 m (26,545 ft). They endured a protracted descent and both men suffered from frostbite, all of Lachenal's toes had to be amputated to prevent further damage being caused by the gangrene which developed.

Lachenal's diary from the Annapurna expedition was published in 1956 as the book Carnets du vertige. Lachenal's son, Jean-Claude, inherited the diaries and in 1996 he approved the publication of an unexpurgated version which led to questions about significant aspects of the "official" account which had been published by the expedition leader Maurice Herzog (who had also become a tuteur, a form of guardian, to Jean-Claude after his father's death).

== Alpinist ==
Lionel Terray, one of the team who helped Lachenal descend after he summitted on Annapurna, had been Lachenal's regular climbing partner, from the time that they first climbed together in 1945. (Note: page 109: Terray describes Lachenal as "companion of my greatest alpine ascents")

Lachenal and Terray made the fourth ascent of the north face of the Grandes Jorasses via the Walker Spur in August 1946; they bivouaced only once on the climb, none of the previous ascents had taken less than 3 days. In 1947 Lachenal and Terray made the second ascent of the North Face of the Eiger. Lachenal was described by Terray as "by far the fastest and most brilliant climber I have ever known on delicate or loose terrain".

Lachenal died falling into a snow-covered crevasse while skiing the Vallee Blanche in Chamonix. The mountain Pointe Lachenal in the Mont Blanc massif was named after him.
