= Timeline of climbing the Eiger =

The recorded history of climbing of the Eiger mountain in Switzerland starts in the 1800s. It is split between the Eiger pre-north face era, when the main summits and easier ridges and faces were climbed, and the post-north face era, when it became one of the greatest prizes in mountaineering. At least sixty-four climbers have died while attempting the ascent (mainly via the north face).

== First ascents (pre-north face era) ==
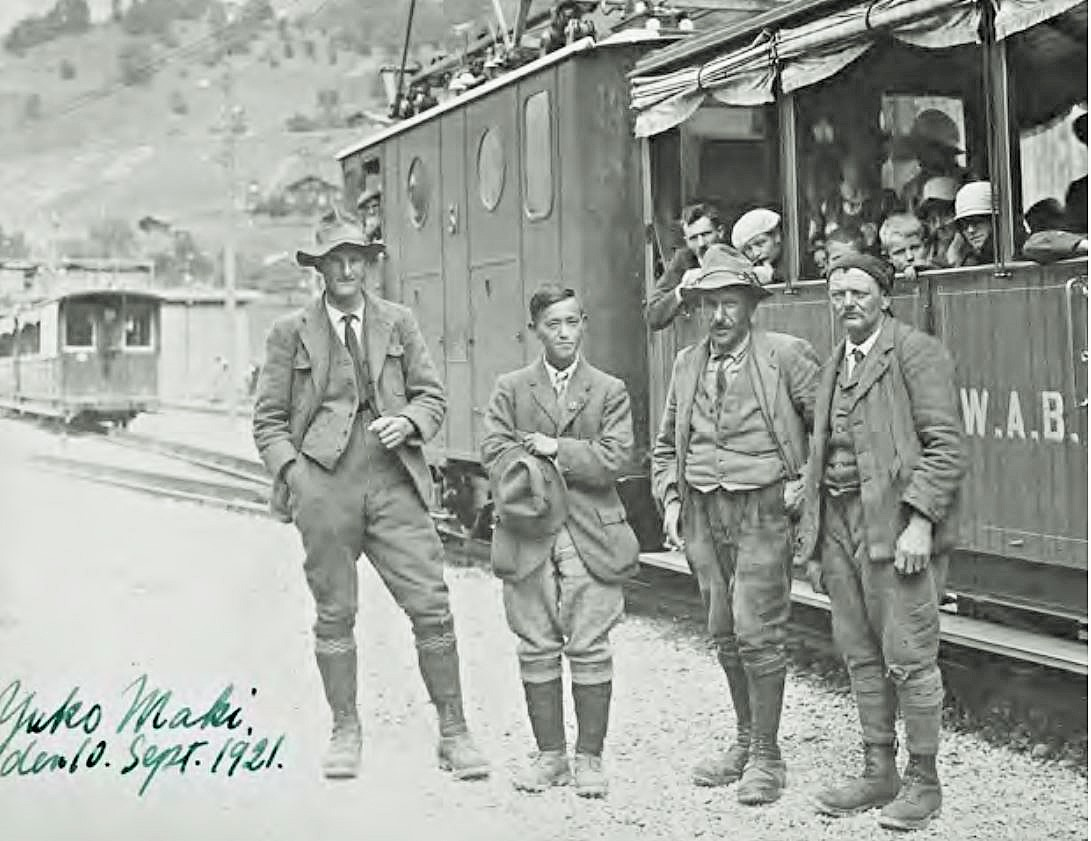
Brawand, Maki, Steuri and Amatter after their ascent of the Mittellegi ridge

- 1857: First attempt by Christian Almer, Christian Kaufmann, Ulrich Kaufmann guiding the Viennese alpinist Sigismund Porges. They did manage the first ascent of neighboring Mönch.
- 1858 (11 August): First ascent, by the west flank (Christian Almer and Peter Bohren guiding Charles Barrington). According to Harrer's "The White Spider," Barrington would have attempted the first Matterhorn ascent instead, but his finances did not allow him to travel there as he was already staying in the Eiger region.
- 1861 (27 July): Second ascent, by Sigismund Porges with the guides Christian Michel, Hans, and Peter Baumann.
- 1864 (27 July): Fourth ascent, and first ascent by a woman, Lucy Walker, who was part of a group of six guides (including Christian Almer and Melchior Anderegg) and five clients, including her brother Horace Walker
- 1871: First ascent by the southwest ridge, 14 July (Christian Almer, Christian Bohren, and Ulrich Almer guiding W. A. B. Coolidge and Meta Brevoort).
- 1890: First ascent in winter, Ulrich Kaufmann and Christian Jossi guiding C. W. Mead and G. F. Woodroffe.
- 1921 (10 September): First ascent via the Mittellegi ridge by Fritz Amatter, Samuel Brawand, Yuko Maki and Fritz Steuri.
- 1924: First ski ascent and descent via the Eiger glacier by Englishman Arnold Lunn and the Swiss Fritz Amacher, Walter Amstutz, and Willy Richardet.
- 1932: First ascent of the northeast face ("Lauper route") by Hans Lauper, Alfred Zürcher, Alexander Graven, and Josef Knubel

== 1930s and 1940s (north face era) ==
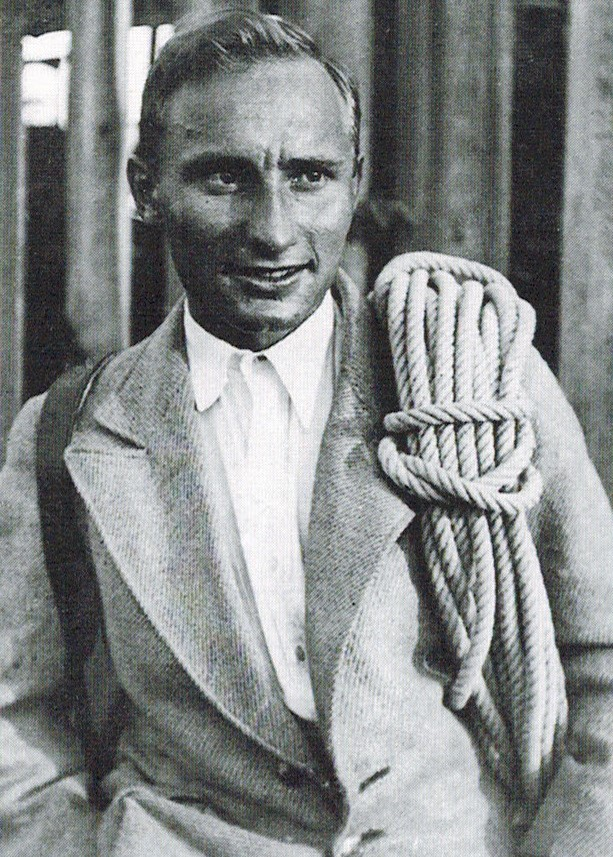
Max Sedlmeyer

- 1934: First attempt on the face, by Willy Beck, Kurt Löwinger, and Georg Löwinger, reaching 2,900 m.
- 1935: Attempt by the Germans Karl Mehringer and Max Sedlmeyer. They froze to death at 3,300 m, a place now known as "Death Bivouac."
- 1936: (July) Four Austrian and German climbers, Andreas Hinterstoisser, Toni Kurz, Willy Angerer and Edi Rainer, died on the face during severe weather conditions on a retreat from Death Bivouac.
- 1938: First ascent of the north face by Anderl Heckmair, Heinrich Harrer, Fritz Kasparek and Ludwig Vörg, achieved in three days.
- 1947 (July 14–16): Second ascent of the face by the Frenchmen Lionel Terray and Louis Lachenal.
- 1947 (August 4–5): Third ascent by the Swiss climbers Hans Schlunegger, Karl Schlunegger and Gottfried Jermann

== 1950s ==
- 1950 (July 26): Fourth ascent in one very long day with a bivouac on the summit by Leo Forstenlechner and Erich Wascak. They overtake Swiss climbers Jean Fuchs, Marcel Hamel, Raymond Monney, and Robert Seiler, who achieve the fifth ascent on 27 July.
- 1957: Two Italian (Claudio Corti and Stefano Longhi) and two German climbers (Franz Meyer and Gunther Nothdurft) encounter extreme difficulties in the higher part of the route, as Nothdurft becomes ill and Longhi, who is suffering from severe frostbite, falls near "the Spider" and cannot be lifted by his companions. Corti (who has been in turn hit by a falling stone) becomes the first man rescued from the face from above in a famous 54-man rescue action (first undertaken by volunteer climbers and non-Swiss guides) when German guide Alfred Hellepart is lowered from the summit on a steel cable by Ludwig Gramminger's rescue system. Longhi is not so lucky and dies of exposure before he can be rescued. Meyer and Nothdurft died in an avalanche on their descent of the Eiger's west face after completing the 14th ascent of the north face (they had left the injured Corti with all their provisions—including a small tent—and were trying to descend from the mountain and call rescue). The body of Longhi remained on the face for more than two years before being recovered.
  - Claudio Corti, being the sole survivor, was quite wrongly castigated by some quarters of the international press and was held responsible for the disappearance of the two German climbers Northdurft and Mayer (Northdurft had already soloed to the Swallows Nest and back). He was accused of various dark deeds, even of pushing the Germans off the face. Corti actually thought he had done the first Italian ascent of the face until it was pointed out that he had finished the climb tied to the back of another climber.
- 1958: Kurt Diemberger and Wolfgang Stefan make the thirteenth ascent. As the bodies of Nothdurft and Meyer were found later on the descent route from the Eiger—both had been killed by an avalanche—Diemberger and Stefan were finally awarded the 14th ascent of the face.
- 1959: Adolf Derungs and Lucas Albrecht, two Swiss masons, climb the face with very primitive equipment. Derungs wore four shirts one on top of another and Albrecht carried an old overcoat as far as the Spider. Both students, brave to the point of rashness and very tough, descend by night by the west flank. Three years later, in 1962, Derungs disappears while attempting a solo ascent of the north face.

== 1960s ==
- 1961 (6–12 March): First winter ascent of the face by Toni Kinshofer, Anderl Mannhardt, Walter Almberger and Toni Hiebeler.
- 1961 (30 August–2 September): First Czechoslovak ascent of the face by Radovan Kuchař and Zdeno Zibrín (19th overall).
- 1961 (31 August–2 September): First Polish ascent of the face by Stanisław Biel and Jan Mostowski (20th overall).
- 1962: Don Whillans climbing with Chris Bonington aborted his only attempt at the North face (arriving ahead of a large rescue team) to rescue Brian Nally, a British climber whose companion, Barry Brewster, had fallen and was badly injured on the Second Icefield. Brewster's body eventually 'fell from the face' and Nally was brought down to safety.
- 1962: First all-Italian ascent of the face by Armando Aste, Pierlorenzo Acquistapace, Gildo Airoldi, Andrea Mellano, Romano Perego, and Franco Solina.
- 1962: First American ascent of the face by John Harlin, with German Konrad Kirch.
- 1962: First British ascent of the face, by Chris Bonington and Ian Clough. Scottish climber Tommy Carruthers and his Austrian climbing partner were below Bonnington and Clough when the latter pair fell to their deaths.
- 1962: Two young climbers finished the climb just after Clough and Bonington (who overtook them); their names were withheld to avert a flood of ascents of the Eiger's north face. They were very young, their equipment was rudimentary, and the letter they left their parents galvanized police action; the police were waiting for them on their return.
- 1963 (2–3 August): First solo ascent of the face by Michel Darbellay, in around 18 hours of climbing.
- 1963 (15 August): Two Spanish climbers, Ernesto Navarro and Alberto Rabadá, die in a storm.
- 1963 (27–31 December): Three Swiss guides complete the first descent of the face, retrieving the bodies of Navarro and Rabadá from the "White Spider."
- 1964 (1–3 September): German Daisy Voog becomes the first woman to reach the summit via the face (with Werner Bittner).
- 1965 (August): Harry Stewart, Mitchell Millar (UK) Al & Tad Katzmarek (Polish) reach the Ramp, Stewart and Katzmarek cousins retreat, Millar solo to the summit.
- 1966 (March 22): After a fixed rope break, American John Harlin falls to his death while attempting a new route: the direttissima, or "most direct" route. His colleague, Scotsman Dougal Haston, joins the competing team of Siegfried Hupfauer, Jörg Lehne, Günter Strobel and Roland Votteler, and they go on to complete the first direttissima (they reach the summit on 25 March, after one month's siege). The new route is named the "John Harlin Route" in Harlin's honour.
- 1968 (28–31 July): First ascent of the north pillar, by a Polish team: Krzysztof Cielecki, Tadeusz Łaukajtys, Ryszard Szafirski, Adam Zyzak.
- 1969 First ascent of the Japanese Direct route, on the North face, by a team of six which was led by Takio Kato, and included his brother Yasuo Kato, Satoru Nigishi, Amano Hirofumi, Susumu Kubo and one woman, Michiko Imai.

== 1970s ==
- 1970: Leo Dickinson, Eric Jones, Pete Minks, and Cliff Phillips (GB) make the first complete film of the climb.
- 1971: First Belgian ascent of the face by Renaat Van Malderen and Vincent de Waele.
- 1971: Peter Siegert and Martin Biock are winched from above Death Bivouac to a helicopter, the first such successful rescue.
- 1973: First All Female Ascent of the face by Wanda Rutkiewicz, Danuta Gellner-Wach and Stefania Egierszdorff. All Polish.
- 1974: Reinhold Messner and Peter Habeler climb the face in 10 hours. Chris Kopcznski and John Roskelley first all US team climb the face en route home from the Pamir Mountains.
- 1975: Second winter and the first British winter ascent of the 1938 route by Joe Tasker and Dick Renshaw. This was the first Alpine Style ascent of the North Face in winter - completing the climb from bottom to top in one push. It was also the first time the face had been climbed in winter without recourse to fixed ropes.
- 1977: First alpine-style ascent of the Eiger Direct (Harlin Route) by Alex MacIntyre (UK) and Tobin Sorenson (US).
- 1977: First Dutch ascent of the face by Ronald Naar and Bas Gresnigt.
- 1978: First Polish winter ascent of the face by Andrzej Czok, Walenty Fiut, Janusz Skorek and Jan Wolf, the fastest winter ascent at that time.
- 1978: First winter solo ascent by Tsuneo Hasegawa.

== 1980s ==
- 1981: First British solo ascent of the face by Welsh climber Eric Jones, filmed by Leo Dickinson and released as Eiger Solo.
- 1981 (25 August): Swiss guide Ueli Bühler soloes the face in 8 hours and 30 minutes.
- 1982: Slovene Franček Knez soloes the face in 6 hours.
- 1982: First American winter ascent by Harry Kent and Keith Lober.
- 1983 (21 March–2 April — 13 days on the wall): First winter solo ascent and a new route on the face (the ideal direttissima) by Slovak Pavel Pochylý.
- 1983 (27 July): Austrian Thomas Bubendorfer soloes the face without a rope in 4 hours and 50 minutes, almost halving Bühler's time.
- 1984 (21 July): Slovene Slavko (Miroslav) Svetičič. A classic route, a solo climb in 8 hours.
- 1985: French climber Christophe Profit soloes the north face in the first solo winter ascent in 10 hours.
- 1985: Second British solo ascent by Steve Monks.
- 1987 (11–12 March): Christophe Profit soloes the "north face trilogy" (Eiger, Matterhorn, and Grandes Jorasses) in one outing ('Enchainment') of 42 hours and in winter.
- 1987 (19–21 September): Hungarian climbers Jozsef Himer, Peter Szabadka, and Gabor Berecz.
- 1988: Alison Hargreaves climbs the face while nearly six months pregnant.

== 1990s ==
- 1990 (14–15 January): Slavko Svetičič solo climbs the Harlin route in 26 hours, its first winter ascent.
- 1991: Jeff Lowe solos Metanoia on the north face in winter without bolts.
- 1992 (9 March): First female solo ascent by Catherine Destivelle (France), in 17 hours in winter.
- 1997: Benedetto Salaroli, aged 72, becomes the oldest man to ascend the face, climbing it in a single day with guides Ueli Bühler and Kobi Reichen.

== 2000s ==
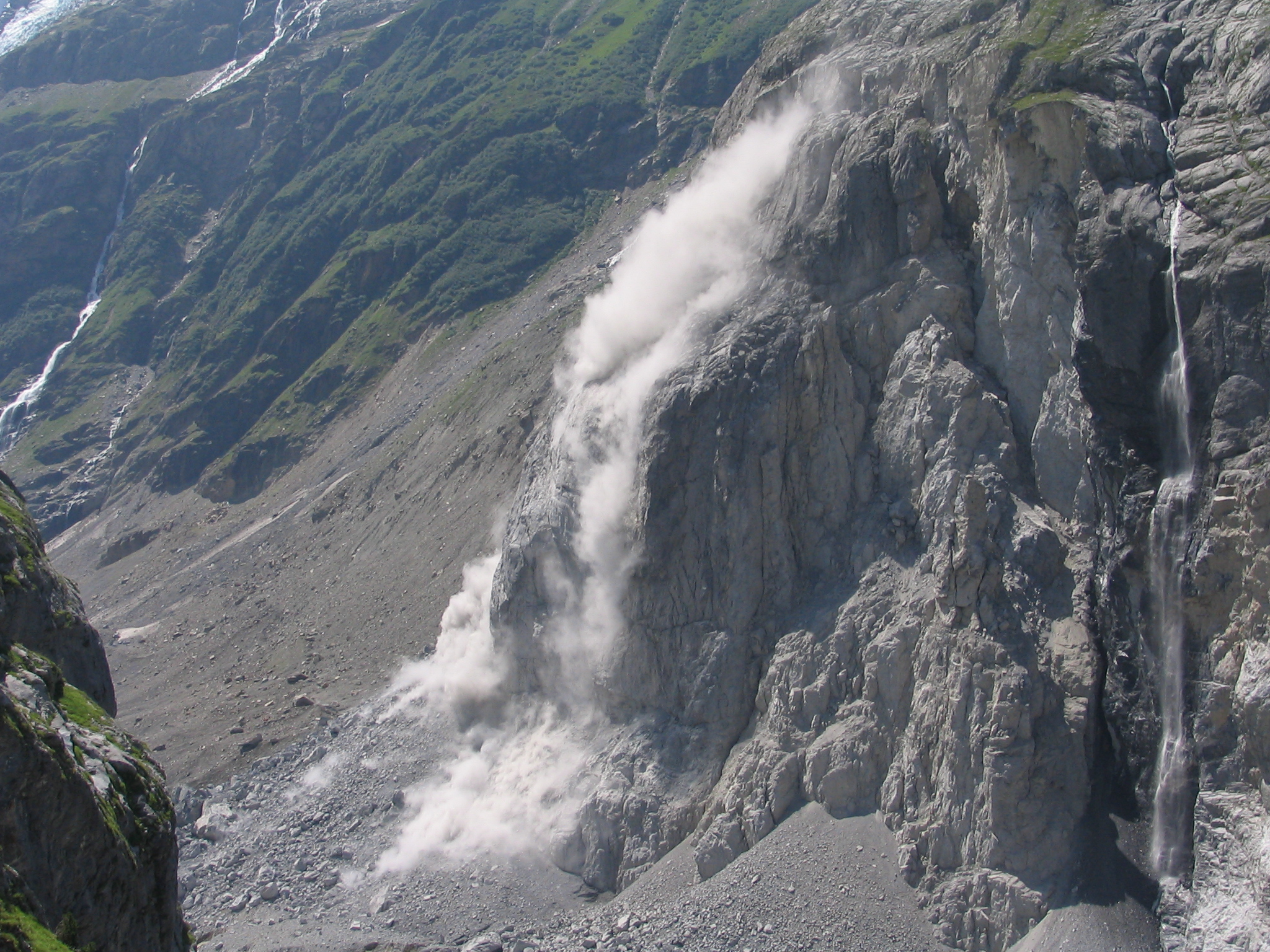
Rockfall onto the Lower Grindelwald Glacier valley, July 2006

- 2003 (24 March): Christoph Hainz breaks Bubendorfer's record by ten minutes, climbing the face in 4 hours and 40 minutes.
- 2007 (9 April): Christophe Profit guides the face for the tenth time.
- 2007 (21 February): Ueli Steck (Switzerland) breaks Christoph Hainz's record, soloing the face in 3 hours and 54 minutes.
- 2008 (28 January): Swiss climbers Roger Schäli and Simon Anthamatten set a new record for a team ascent (of the Heckmair route) climbing it in 6 hours and 50 minutes.
- 2008 (13 February): Ueli Steck breaks his own record, soloing the face in 2 hours, 47 minutes and 33 seconds.
- 2008 (23 February): Swiss climbers Dani Arnold and Stephan Ruoss better the team record (Schäli and Anthamatten), climbing the Heckmair route in 6 hours, 10 minutes.
- 2008 (31 May): Ueli Steck is presented with the inaugural Eiger Award.
- 2008 (7 August): Dean Potter (US) free-solos Deep Blue Sea (5.12+) on the face, then BASE jumps from the top using an ultralight rig he wore during the climb.

== 2010s ==
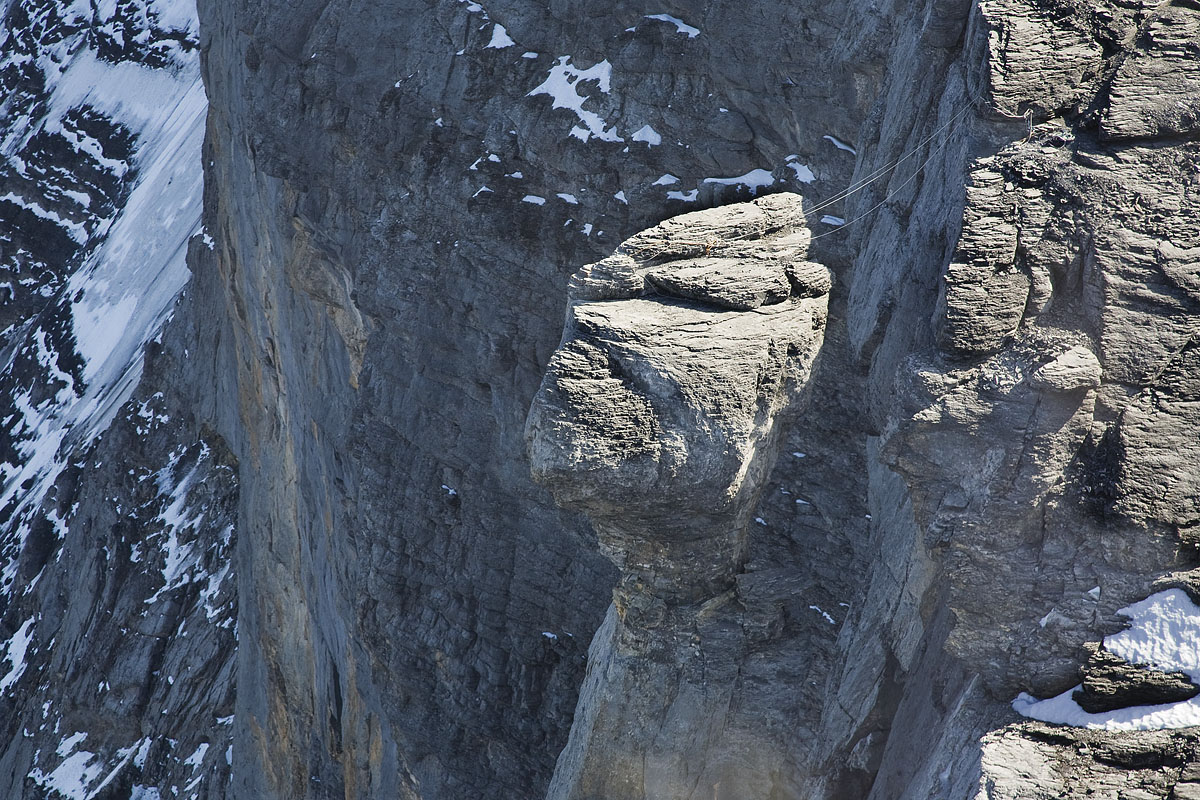
The mushroom (Pilz) of the Eiger

- 2011 (20 April): Daniel Arnold (Switzerland) solos the face in 2 hours 28 minutes, using the fixed ropes on the Hinterstoisser Traverse. Arnold was 19 minutes faster than Ueli Steck in 2008, but Steck climbed the route entirely without aid and, unlike Arnold, completed the route in the official winter season.
- 2014 (14 March): Mark Salamon solos the face via the classic route - the first Hungarian climber to make any solo ascent of the North Face.
- 2015 (29 August): Sasha DiGiulian becomes the first woman to free climb Magic Mushroom (7c+), one of the most difficult routes on the north face of the Eiger.
- 2015 (12 November): New team ascent record by Ueli Steck and Nicolas Hojac in 3 hours 46 minutes.
- 2015 (17 November): Ueli Steck climbs the Heckmair Route in 2 hours 22 minutes 50.7 seconds.

== See also ==
- List of mountains of the canton of Bern
- List of highest mountains of Switzerland
- List of mountains of Switzerland
- List of mountains of Switzerland above 3000 m

== Works cited ==
- Anker, Daniel (2000). Eiger: The Vertical Arena. Seattle: The Mountaineers.
- Harrer, Heinrich (1959). The White Spider: The History of the Eiger's North Face (in German) (3rd ed.). London.
- Pagel, David (1999). "My Dinner with Anderl". Ascent. Golden, Colorado: AAC Press: 13–26.
- Simpson, Joe (2002). The Beckoning Silence. London: Jonathan Cape Publishers. ISBN 0-09-942243-3.
