= The White Spider =

1959 book by Heinrich Harrer about the first ascent of the Eiger's north face in 1937

- Title page for Die Weisse Spinne (1974 edition)
- Author: Heinrich Harrer
- Original title: Die Weisse Spinne
- Publication date: 1959

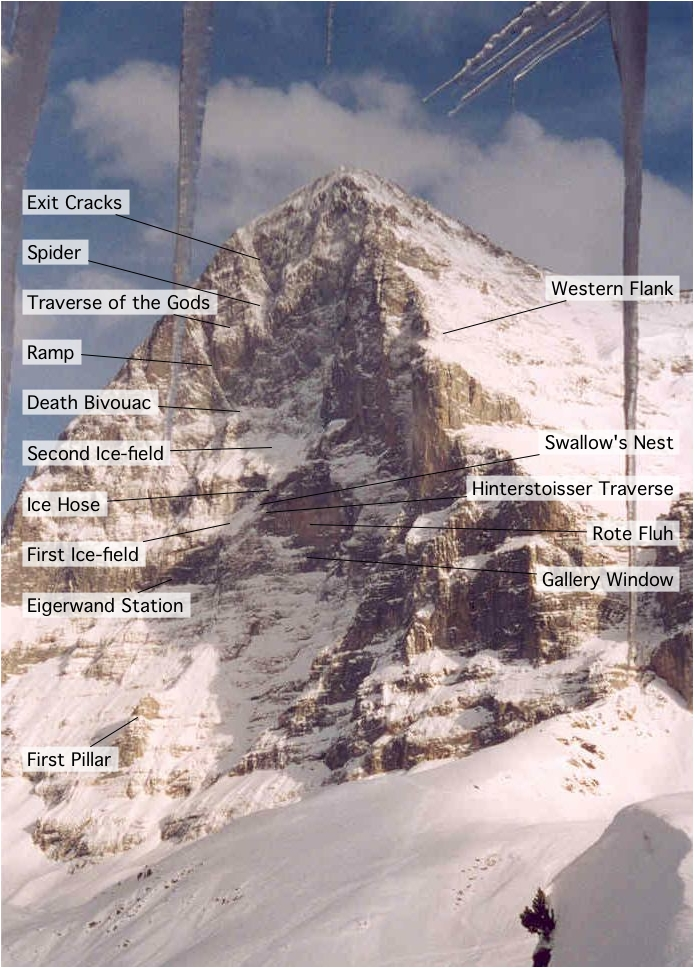
Nordwand (north face) of the Eiger, with a diagram showing the route established during the events written about in The White Spider. The Spider ice-field is located on the peak's upper left.

The White Spider (1959; with chapters added in 1964; original title: Die Weisse Spinne) is a non-fiction book by Heinrich Harrer that describes the first successful ascent of the infamous north face (Nordwand) of the Eiger, a mountain in the Berner Oberland of the Swiss Alps, with sections devoted to the history of mountaineering and alpine climbing in the area.

== Overview ==
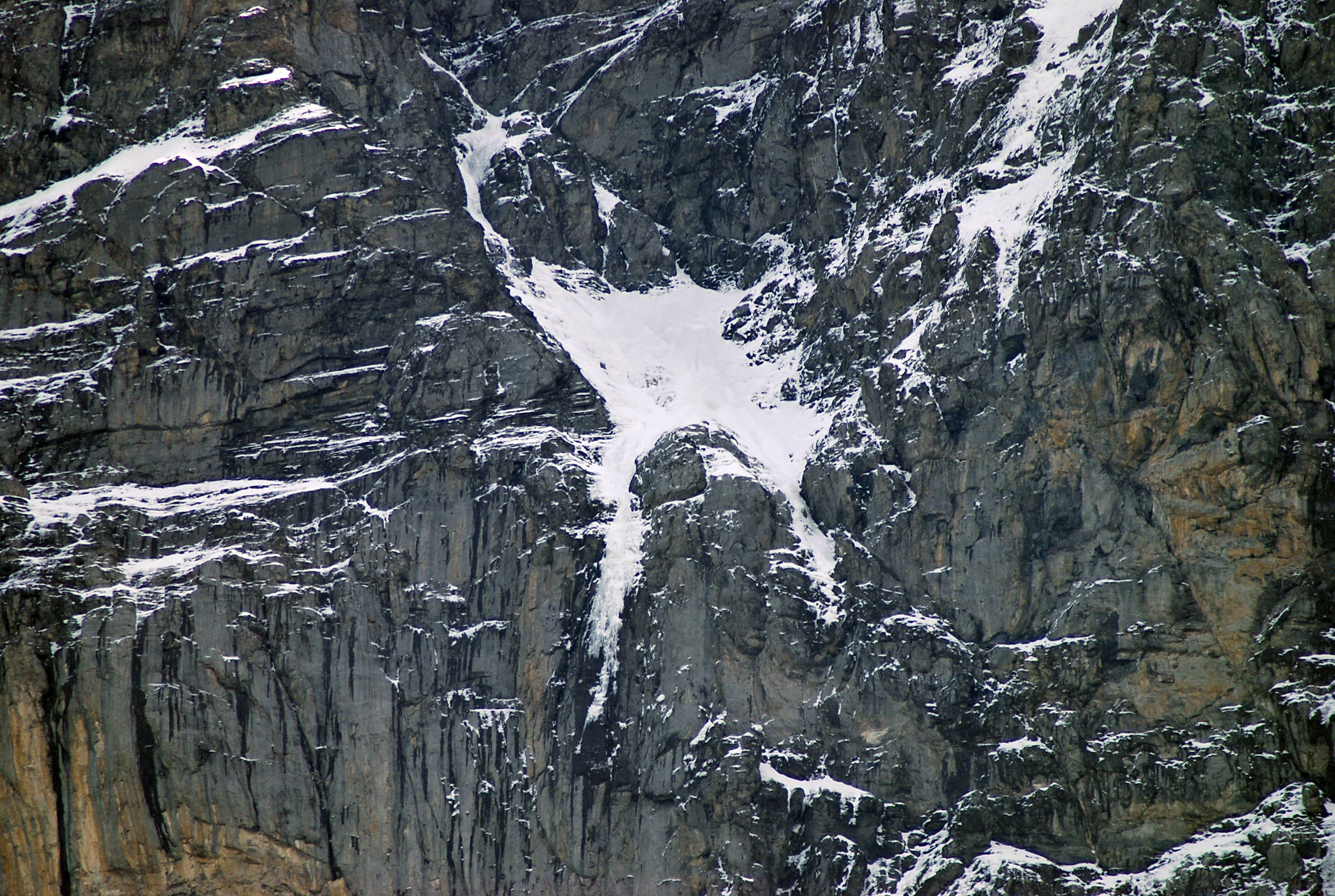
The eponymous "White Spider" on the Eiger's North Face

The White Spider tells the stories of the first attempts by alpine climbers to ascend the Eiger's North Face, a nearly vertical wall of rock, snow, and ice almost 1,828 metres tall from its base to the mountain's 3,967-metre summit, making it the tallest north face in the Alps. Well known for both its technical difficulty and its extreme hazards from avalanches, falling rock, and severe weather, the North Face is also notorious for the many accidents and tragedies that have befallen its climbers, for which it has been given the colloquial epithet Mordwand ("murder wall"), a play on Nordwand ("north wall"). Harrer recounts in detail all of the first attempts and successes on the Face through the first 25 years of its climbing history, beginning with Max Sedlmayr's and Karl Mehringer's disastrous try in 1935, through the first successful ascent by a German-Austrian party in 1938, of which Harrer himself was a member, and continuing to the successful ascent by Kurt Diemberger and Wolfgang Stefan in July 1958.

After his successful summit of the mountain, Harrer endeavored to write a history of the early years of climbing on the Face, and received many letters from fellow climbers, which he sifted through with climber and author Kurt Maix to become the contents of The White Spider. Harrer describes in particular the tragedy of the 1936 attempt by Edi Rainer, Willy Angerer, Andreas Hinterstoisser, and Toni Kurz, all of whom died during the climb; Harrer's own climb, which was the first successful ascent of the North Face; the strenuous but successful climb of Hermann Buhl, Gaston Rébuffat, and their seven companions in 1952; and the catastrophe of 1957, when two Italians, Stefano Longhi and Claudio Corti, joined two Germans, Günther Nothdurft and Franz Mayer – which resulted in eight bivouac nights on the wall of the mountain for the Italians and the death of all but Corti. Harrer's account of the 1957 tragedy was the subject of much controversy when published and is no longer considered historically accurate. In the book, Harrer also describes the media frenzy that ensued after each of the tragedies because the whole of the mountain's Nordwand can be watched by telescope from nearby Kleine Scheidegg.

== Book title ==
The title of the book is derived from a spider-shaped ice field high on the north face of the mountain, towering above the town of Grindelwald. As Harrer describes, and the climbers discovered, the White Spider is the key to a successful ascent of the Nordwand. Although physically exhausted by the time they reach that point, climbers must navigate the steep ice-field to reach the peak's summit. The White Spider acts as a funnel, with rock and ice slides channelled through the ice field, putting the climbers in great danger while on the field.

== Sources ==
- The White Spider by Heinrich Harrer. Currently in print by a number of publishers.
