= Ulrich Tukur =

German actor and musician (born 1957)

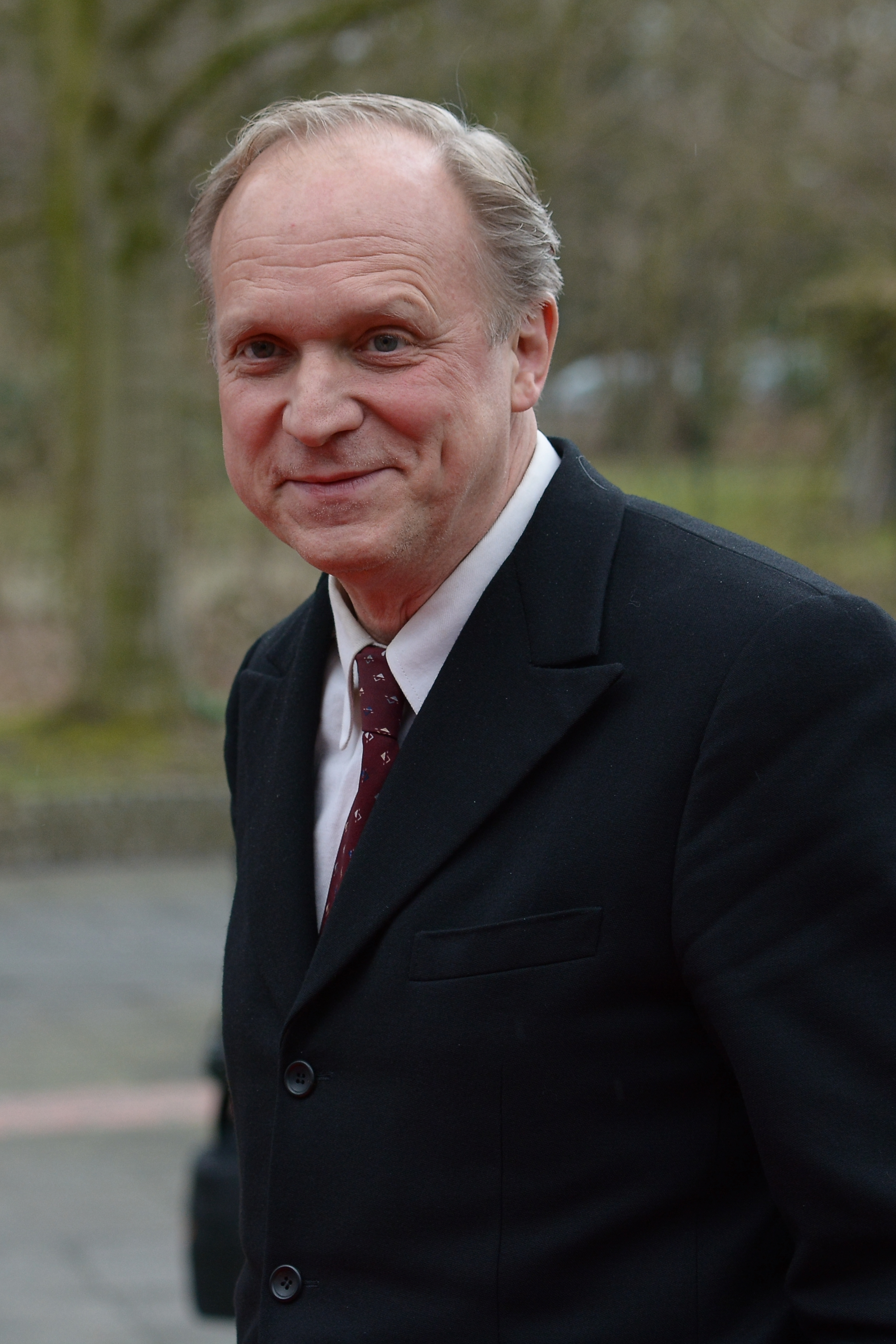
- Tukur in 2015
- Born: Ulrich Gerhard Scheurlen; 29 July 1957 (age 69); Viernheim, West Germany
- Other name: Ulrich Scheurlen
- Occupations: Actor, musician
- Years active: 1983–present
- Spouses: Amber Wood; Katharina John
- Children: 2

Ulrich Tukur (born Ulrich Gerhard Scheurlen; 29 July 1957) is a German actor and musician. He is known for his roles in Michael Haneke's The White Ribbon, Steven Soderbergh's Solaris, the docudrama North Face based on the 1936 Eiger climbing disaster in Switzerland, and as Wilhelm Uhde in Martin Provost's biopic Séraphine.

== Early life and education ==
Tukur spent his youth near Hannover where he finished his final secondary school examinations in 1977. He also earned a high school diploma in Boston, Massachusetts during a student exchange, where he met his first wife, Amber Wood. With her, he has two daughters, Marlene and Lilian. While Tukur and Wood were dating, he finished his time with the army and began to study German, English and history at the University of Tübingen. He worked as a musician for extra money. Someone who saw him asked him if he wanted to be in a play. Soon he became interested in acting and started studying acting at the Staatliche Hochschule für Musik und Darstellende Kunst in Stuttgart in 1980.

== Career ==
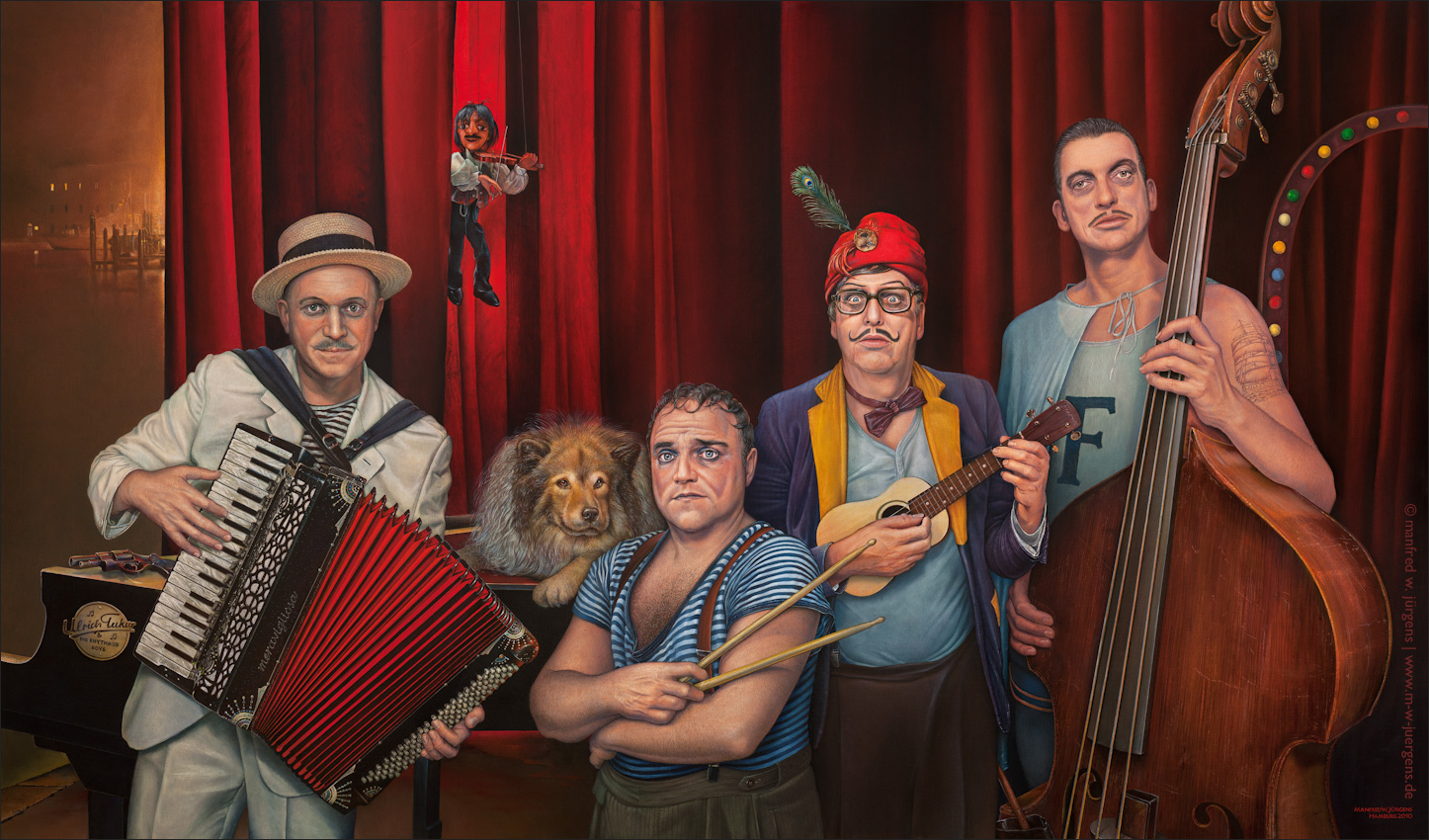
Painting Ulrich Tukur and the Rhythm Boys by Manfred W. Juergens

After finishing his acting studies in 1983, Tukur performed at a theatre in Heidelberg. While he was still a student, he starred in his first movie. In Die Weiße Rose, directed by Michael Verhoeven, he plays the character of Willi Graf.

In 1984 Tukur had his breakthrough at the theatre when famous director Peter Zadek gave him a role at the Freie Volksbühne Berlin in Joshua Sobol's play Ghetto. From 1985 to 1995 he was a staff actor at Deutsches Schauspielhaus in Hamburg, then managed by Zadek. Here he starred in many plays, such as Shakespeare's Julius Caesar as Marc Anton, Hamlet, and Frank Wedekind's Lulu directed by Zadek. In 1986 he was elected actor of the year by German theater critics. From 1995 to 2003 he was the director of the Hamburger Kammerspiele theatre, sharing that job with Ulrich Waller.

Potsdamer Platz Filmmuseum Boulevard der Stars Ulrich Tukur

Since 1989, Tukur has been recording and touring as a musician. In 1995, he founded the dance band "Ulrich Tukur & the Rhythmus Boys" together with Kalle Mews (drums), Ulrich Mayer (guitar, vocals), and Günther Märtens (contrabass, guitar, vocals).

Tukur has been married twice. From 1999 until 2019 he and his second wife, the photographer Katharina John, lived in Venice, Italy, on Giudecca. Since 2019 Tukur has been living in Berlin-Schöneberg.

In John Rabe, the Sino-German co-production about the Nanjing massacre, Tukur played the part of John Rabe. In Kommissar Rex he played the psychopath Kurt Hauff, who killed police officer Richard Moser (Tobias Moretti). He also played the title role in the 1999 documentary Bonhoeffer: Agent of Grace.

== Awards ==
- 1984 O.E. Hasse Preis
- 1985 Boy-Gobert-Preis
- 1986 Schauspieler des Jahres (Actor of the Year) and Goldener Bär of the Berlinale for the film Stammheim.
- 1996 Goldene Kamera and Insel-Kunstpreis Hamburg
- 2000 Adolf Grimme Awards
- 2004 Deutscher Fernsehpreis (German Television Award) as Best Actor for the role of a serial killer in the crime series Tatort, episode "Das Böse" (Evil)
- 2006: Deutscher Filmpreis for Best Acting Performance - Male Supporting Actor for The Lives of Others
- 2009: Bayerischer Filmpreis 2008 Best Actor in John Rabe
- 2009: Deutscher Filmpreis for Best Leading Actor in John Rabe
- 2009: Bernhard-Wicki-Filmpreis|Friedenspreis des Deutschen Films for his acting in John Rabe

== Selected filmography ==
- 1982: Die Weiße Rose (Director: Michael Verhoeven) (with Lena Stolze as Sophie Scholl), as Willi Graf
- 1983: The Swing (Director: Percy Adlon (with Anja Jaenicke and Lena Stolze), as Lhombre
- 1984: Die Story (Director: Eckhart Schmidt), as Alexander
- 1984: Cold Fever (Director: Josef Rusnak), as Michael
- 1986: Stammheim (Director: Reinhard Hauff) (with Therese Affolter as Ulrike Meinhof), as Andreas Baader
- 1986: The Lenz Papers (TV miniseries) (from a novel by Stefan Heym), as Friedrich Engels
- 1988: Felix (Director: Margarethe von Trotta, Helma Sanders-Brahms, Helke Sander, Christel Buschmann), as Felix
- 1988: Ballhaus Barmbek
- 1989: The Play with Billions (TV film, Director: Peter Keglevic) (with Friedrich von Thun and Sissy Höfferer), as Gerd Asselt
- 1990: Werner – Beinhart! (voice)
- 1991: The Kaltenbach Papers (TV film, Director: Rainer Erler) (with Mario Adorf and Gudrun Landgrebe), as Thomas 'Tom' Sadowski
- 1992: The Democratic Terrorist (Director: Pelle Berglund) (with Stellan Skarsgård), as Siegfried Maak
- 1992: The Mystery of the Amber Room (Director: Roland Gräf) (with Corinna Harfouch), as Siegfried Emmler
- 1992: The Last U-Boat (TV film, Director: Frank Beyer) (with Ulrich Mühe), as Röhler - 1. Wachoffizier
- 1993: Wehner – die unerzählte Geschichte (TV film, Director: Heinrich Breloer) (with Heinz Baumann as old Herbert Wehner), as young Herbert Wehner
- 1993: Maus und Katz (with Mario Adorf), as Fred Tonndorf
- 1994: Rotwang Must Go!, as Bruno's Friend, the Famous Actor
- 1994: Felidae (Director: Michael Schaack), as Francis (voice)
- 1994: Geschäfte (TV film, Director: Michael Schottenberg) (with Susanne Lothar and Ulrich Mühe), as Dr. Weiß
- 1995: My Mother's Courage (Director: Michael Verhoeven) (with Pauline Collins, from an autobiographical novel by George Tabori), as SS Officer
- 1995: Tár úr steini
- 1995: Nikolaikirche (TV film, Director: Frank Beyer) (with Barbara Auer and Ulrich Matthes), as Rechtsanwalt Werner Schnuck
- 1996: Charms Zwischenfälle, as Narrator
- 1996: One More Kiss and He's Dead!, as Conrad Veidt
- 1999: Waiting Means Death (TV film), as Jürgen Venske
- 1999: Pünktchen und Anton (uncredited)
- 2000: Hunters in the Snow, as Franz
- 2000: Bonhoeffer: Agent of Grace (TV film, Director: Eric Till), as Dietrich Bonhoeffer
- 2000: Apokalypse 99 - Anatomie eines Amokläufers
- 2001: Taking Sides (Director: István Szabó) (with Harvey Keitel and Moritz Bleibtreu), as Helmut Alfred Rode, 2nd violinist
- 2002: Amen. (Director: Constantin Costa-Gavras) (with Ulrich Mühe - from the play Der Stellvertreter by Rolf Hochhuth), as Kurt Gerstein
- 2002: Solaris (Director: Steven Soderbergh) (with George Clooney and Natascha McElhone - from the homonymous novel by Stanisław Lem), as Gibarian
- 2003: Die fremde Frau (TV film, Director: Matthias Glasner) (with Corinna Harfouch), as Alexander Brandenburg
- 2004: Stauffenberg (TV film, Director: Jo Baier) (with Sebastian Koch as Claus Graf Schenk von Stauffenberg), as Henning von Tresckow
- 2005: The Axe, as Gérard Hutchinson
- 2005: The Night of the Great Flood (TV film, Director: Raymond Ley), as Hamburg's senator for the interior Helmut Schmidt
- 2005: The Airlift (TV film, Director: Dror Zahavi), as General Lucius D. Clay
- 2006: Das Leben der Anderen (Director: Florian Henckel von Donnersmarck), as Oberstleutnant Anton Grubitz
- 2006: Das Schneckenhaus (TV film, Director: Florian Schwarz), as Dr. Lukas Bator
- 2007: Mein alter Freund Fritz (TV film, Director: Dieter Wedel), as head physician Seidel
- 2007: 42plus (Director: Sabine Derflinger), as Georg
- 2007: Runaway Horse (Director: Rainer Kaufmann), as Klaus Buch
- 2007: Où est la main de l'homme sans tête, as Peter
- 2008: North Face (Director: Philipp Stölzl), as Henry Arau
- 2008: Séraphine (Director: Martin Provost), as Wilhelm Uhde
- 2009: John Rabe (Director: Florian Gallenberger), as John Rabe
- 2009: Das Vaterspiel, as Jonas Shtrom
- 2009: Eden in West (Director: Costa-Gavras), as Nick Nickleby
- 2009: The White Ribbon (Director: Michael Haneke), as The Baron
- 2009: Within the Whirlwind, as Dr. Anton Walter
- 2010: Greed (TV film, Director: Dieter Wedel), as Dieter Glanz
- 2010: Eichmann's End: Love, Betrayal, Death (TV film), as Willem Sassen
- 2010: The Day of the Cat, as Dr. Stotzer / Pfiff
- Since 2010: Tatort (TV series), as Felix Murot
  - Wie einst Lilly (2010)
  - Das Dorf (2011)
  - Schwindelfrei (2013)
  - Im Schmerz geboren (2014)
  - Wer bin ich? (2015)
  - Long Live Death (2016)
  - Murot und das Murmeltier (2019)
  - Angriff auf Wache 08 (2019)
  - Die Ferien des Monsieur Murot (2020)
  - Murot und das Prinzip Hoffnung (2021)
- 2011: The Burma Conspiracy, as Dwight Cochrane
- 2011: When Pigs Have Wings, as Officer U.N.
- 2012: Zettl, as Urs Doucier
- 2012: Der Mondmann, as President (voice)
- 2012: Rommel (TV film, Director: Niki Stein), as Gen. Erwin Rommel
- 2013: Houston, as Clemens Trunschka
- 2013: Exit Marrakech, as Heinrich
- 2014: Weekends in Normandy, as Ulrich
- 2014: The Chosen Ones (TV film), as Simon Pistorius
- 2015: Grzimek, as Bernhard Grzimek
- 2016: Original Bliss, as Eduard / Psychologist and writer
- 2017: In the Fade, as Jürgen Möller
- 2018: As Green as It Gets, as Richard von Zeydlitz
- 2018: The Assassination (TV film), as Hans-Georg Dahlmann
- 2019: Lost in Separation, as Georg Lehnert
- 2019: Adults in the Room, as Wolfgang
- 2020: Jagdzeit, as Hans Werner Brockmann
- 2020: Der Überläufer, as Ernst Menzel
- 2023: Gestern waren wir noch Kinder (TV miniseries), as Hans Klettmann
- 2024: Martin reads the Quran, as professor of Islamic Studies
- 2025: Köln 75
