= North Face (film) =

2008 German film by Philipp Stölzl

- Theatrical release poster
- Directed by: Philipp Stölzl
- Written by: Christoph Silber; Rupert Henning; Johannes Naber; Philipp Stölzl
- Produced by: Boris Schönfelder; Danny Krausz; Benjamin Herrmann
- Starring: Benno Fürmann; Florian Lukas; Johanna Wokalek; Ulrich Tukur
- Cinematography: Kolja Brandt
- Edited by: Sven Budelmann
- Music by: Christian Kolonovits
- Release dates: 9 October 2008 (Switzerland); 23 October 2008 (Germany); 24 October 2008 (Austria)
- Running time: 121 minutes
- Countries: Germany; Austria; Switzerland
- Language: German

North Face (German: Nordwand) is a 2008 German historical fiction film directed by Philipp Stölzl and starring Benno Fürmann, Florian Lukas, Johanna Wokalek, and Ulrich Tukur. Based on the 1936 Eiger climbing disaster, the film is about two German climbers involved in a competition to climb the most dangerous rock face in the Alps.

== Plot ==
In 1936, the North Face of the Eiger is the last major unclimbed Alpine face. German alpinists Toni Kurz and Andreas "Andi" Hinterstoisser, and novice journalist Luise Fellner are childhood friends from Berchtesgaden, Bavaria. Luise and Toni harbor romantic feelings towards one another, though both hesitate to act upon them since she is living in Berlin and he is emotionally reserved.

Toni and Andi are enlisted in the army. After hearing of a failed attempt on the Eiger’s North Face, they decide to compete to make the first successful ascent. They quit the service and travel to the Bernese Alps.

Luise and her newspaper editor, Henry Arau, are assigned to cover the story. They, along with other journalists and tourists, stay in the luxurious hotel at Kleine Scheidegg. The alpinists camp in the valley, scouting out routes. The French and Italian climbers assess the conditions and cancel their attempts. Toni and Andi begin their climb first and an Austrian team, consisting of Willy Angerer and Edi Rainer, follows close behind. Meanwhile, spectators watch the climbers' progress from the hotel balcony.

Willy is hit on the head by a falling rock, and has a concussion, affecting his cognitive abilities. Despite this, Willy insists that he and Edi continue their ascent. Toni and Andi make good progress and manage to fix a rope across a challenging rock face that will be named the "Hinterstoisser Traverse" in Andi’s honor. Once the Germans and Austrians are across, Andi removes the rope, despite Toni’s worries that they may need it if the climbers must descend.

During a fall, Willy’s leg is injured and he is at risk of bleeding to death. Toni and Andi abandon their summit attempt to help Edi lower Willy down the North Face. The weather worsens into a blizzard. At the hotel, Arau planned to leave early since there would be no summit, but then changes his mind since it appears that a tragedy may be unfolding and it will make a good story. Luise is upset by Arau's callousness.

When the climbers return to the Hinterstoisser Traverse, Andi realizes it was indeed a mistake to remove the fixed rope. He attempts to cross the rock face again, but the weather and fatigue prevent him from re-establishing the route. The group is forced to descend directly downward, despite this being the more dangerous option. An avalanche kills Edi and Willy. Andi is left dangling off a cliff, while Toni struggles to keep the piton and rope from failing. Andi cuts his rope and falls to his death, in the hope that Toni will have a better chance of survival. Toni is left stranded on a small rock shelf.

Luise convinces a rescue team to try to save Toni, though the men must wait until the weather gets better. Toni spends the night without shelter and nearly freezes to death. The rescue team uses a door in the Jungfrau Railway tunnel to access the North Face. Unfortunately, Toni must lower himself down 60 meters (nearly 200 feet) to reach safety.

The rescuers coach him through the process, which takes hours due to Toni’s frostbite and generally deteriorating condition. Because the main rope is too short, the team ties two ropes together. This causes a knot to jam Toni’s carabiner and he becomes stuck, hanging in midair. Luise climbs up to Toni’s level and begs him to not give up, but he has no strength left and passes away.

Afterwards, Luise reflects on her love for Toni and her difficulty accepting his and Andi’s deaths. She leaves Germany and works as a professional photographer in New York City. The epilogue states that the Eiger was conquered in 1938 by a German-Austrian party using Andi and Toni's route across the Hinterstoisser Traverse.

== Cast ==
- Benno Fürmann as Toni Kurz
- Johanna Wokalek as Louise Fellner
- Florian Lukas as Andreas Hinterstoisser
- Simon Schwarz as Willy Angerer
- Georg Friedrich as Edi Rainer
- Ulrich Tukur as Henry Arau
- Erwin Steinhauer as Emil Landauer
- Branko Samarovski as Albert von Allmen
- Petra Morzé as Elisabeth Landauer
- Hanspeter Müller as Hans Schlunegger
- Peter Zumstein as Adolf Rubi
- Martin Schick as Christian Rubi
- Erni Mangold as Grossmutter Kurz
- Johannes Thanheiser as Grossvater Kurz
- Arnd Schimkat as Hotelbesitzer
- Klaus Ofczarek as Redaktionsleiter
- Martin Brambach as Redakteur Henze
- Peter Faerber as Spiess
- Tobias Ofenbauer as Reporter
- Hartmut Scheyhing as Reporter
- Maximilian Pfnür as Wache
- Gerhard Greiner as SS Mann Erlberger
- Hassan Athman as Jazzmusiker
- Nero Pietra as Italienische Seilschaft
- Stefan Steurer as Italienische Seilschaft
- Mark Geisseler as Französische Seilschaft
- Matthias Roduner as Französische Seilschaft

== Production ==
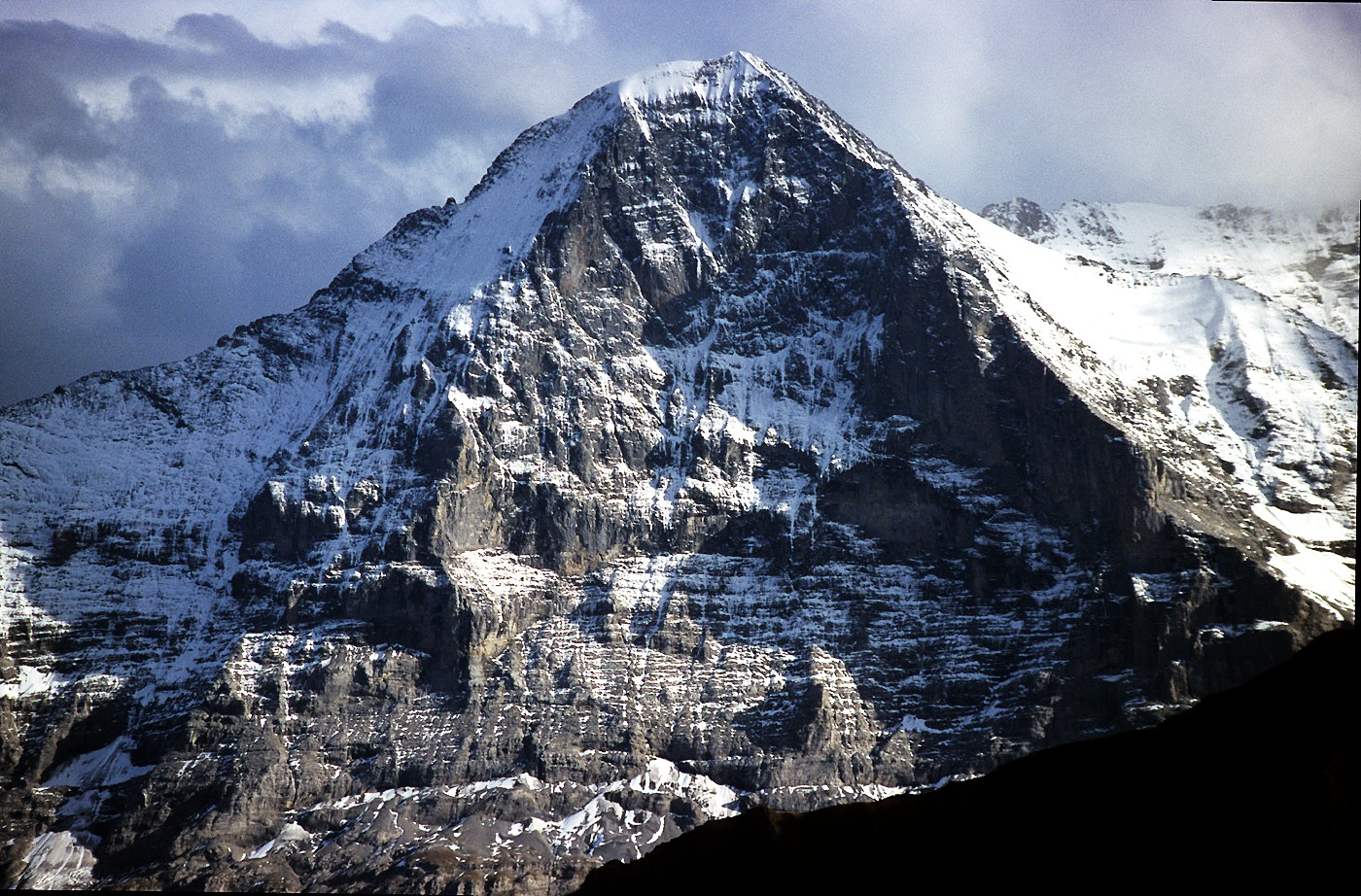
Eiger North Face, Bernese Alps, Switzerland

Filming locations

- Austria
- Dachstein, Steiermark, Austria
- Graz, Styria, Austria
- Kleine Scheidegg, Kanton Bern, Switzerland
- Switzerland

== Reception ==
Critical response

After a successful theatrical run in Germany, Switzerland, and Austria, the film was released in several non-German speaking countries including the United States, United Kingdom, Italy, and Japan from 2009-2010, receiving favorable reviews throughout. Some critics have argued that this is a brilliant metaphor for Germanic anti-Semitism.

Awards and nominations

- 2009 German Film Award in Gold for Best Cinematography (Kolja Brandt)
- 2009 German Film Award in Gold for Best Sound (Heinz Ebner, Guido Zettier, Christian Bischoff, Tschangis Chahrokh)
- 2009 German Film Award in Gold Nomination for Best Production Design (Udo Kramer)
- 2009 German Film Critics Award for Best Cinematography (Kolja Brandt)
- 2009 German Film Critics Award for Best Screenplay (Philipp Stölzl, Christoph Silber, Rupert Henning, Johannes Naber)
- 2009 Motion Picture Sound Editors Golden Reel Award Nomination for Best Sound Editing - Foreign Feature (Alexander Buck, Carsten Richter, Alexander Vitt, Guido Zettier, Tobias Poppe)
