= The Beckoning Silence =

- Directed by: Louise Osmond
- Based on: The Beckoning Silence by Joe Simpson
- Starring: Joe Simpson
- Narrated by: Steven Mackintosh
- Edited by: Ben Lester
- Distributed by: Channel 4
- Release date: 22 October 2007 (UK)
- Running time: 75 min
- Country: United Kingdom
- Language: English

The Beckoning Silence is a 2007 British television film that follows and retraces the 1936 Eiger north face climbing disaster where five climbers perished while attempting to scale the north face of the Eiger mountain in Switzerland. The film features climber Joe Simpson, whose book of the same name inspired the film.

In 2008 it won an International Emmy Award for Best Documentary.

== Cast ==
- Andreas Abegglen as Willy Angerer
- Simon Anthamatten as Andreas Hinterstoisser
- Cyrille Berthod as Edi Rainer
- Roger Schäli as Toni Kurz
- Joe Simpson as himself
- Steven Mackintosh as the narrator
