= Weekends in Normandy =

- Theatrical release poster
- Week-ends
- Directed by: Anne Villacèque
- Written by: Anne Villacèque; Sophie Fillières; Gilles Taurand (collaboration)
- Produced by: Nicolas Blanc
- Starring: Karin Viard; Noémie Lvovsky; Jacques Gamblin; Ulrich Tukur
- Cinematography: Pierre Milon
- Edited by: Nelly Quettier
- Production company: Ex Nihilo
- Distributed by: Haut et Court
- Release date: 26 February 2014
- Running time: 90 minutes
- Country: France
- Language: French
- Budget: $3.2 million
- Box office: $482.000

Weekends in Normandy (original title: Week-ends) is a 2014 French film directed by Anne Villacèque. It stars Karin Viard, Noémie Lvovsky, Jacques Gamblin and Ulrich Tukur.

The drama concerns two couples, each with a house in the Normandie countryside. This was Casadesus's final film, just before she reached 100 years-old.

== Cast ==
- Karin Viard as Christine
- Noémie Lvovsky as Sylvette
- Jacques Gamblin as Jean
- Ulrich Tukur as Ulrich
- Aurélia Petit as Pascale
- Gisèle Casadesus as Françoise
- Finnegan Oldfield as Erwan
- Laure Calamy as Flo
- Iliana Zabeth as Charlotte
- Jeanne Ruff as Charlotte 2
- César Domboy as Julien
- Philippe Rebbot as The antique dealer

== Soundtrack ==
According to the final credits, music in the film included

- Keyboard Concerto in A minor, BWV1065 by Johann Sebastian Bach
- Après un rêve by Fauré
- Pepito (Mi Corazon) by Los Machucambos
- Où sont tous mes amants ? with Ulrich Tukur singing and playing accordion

Gisèle Casadesus and Aurélia Petit recite the poem Green by Paul Verlaine.
