= Leo Dickinson =

British mountaineer and filmmaker

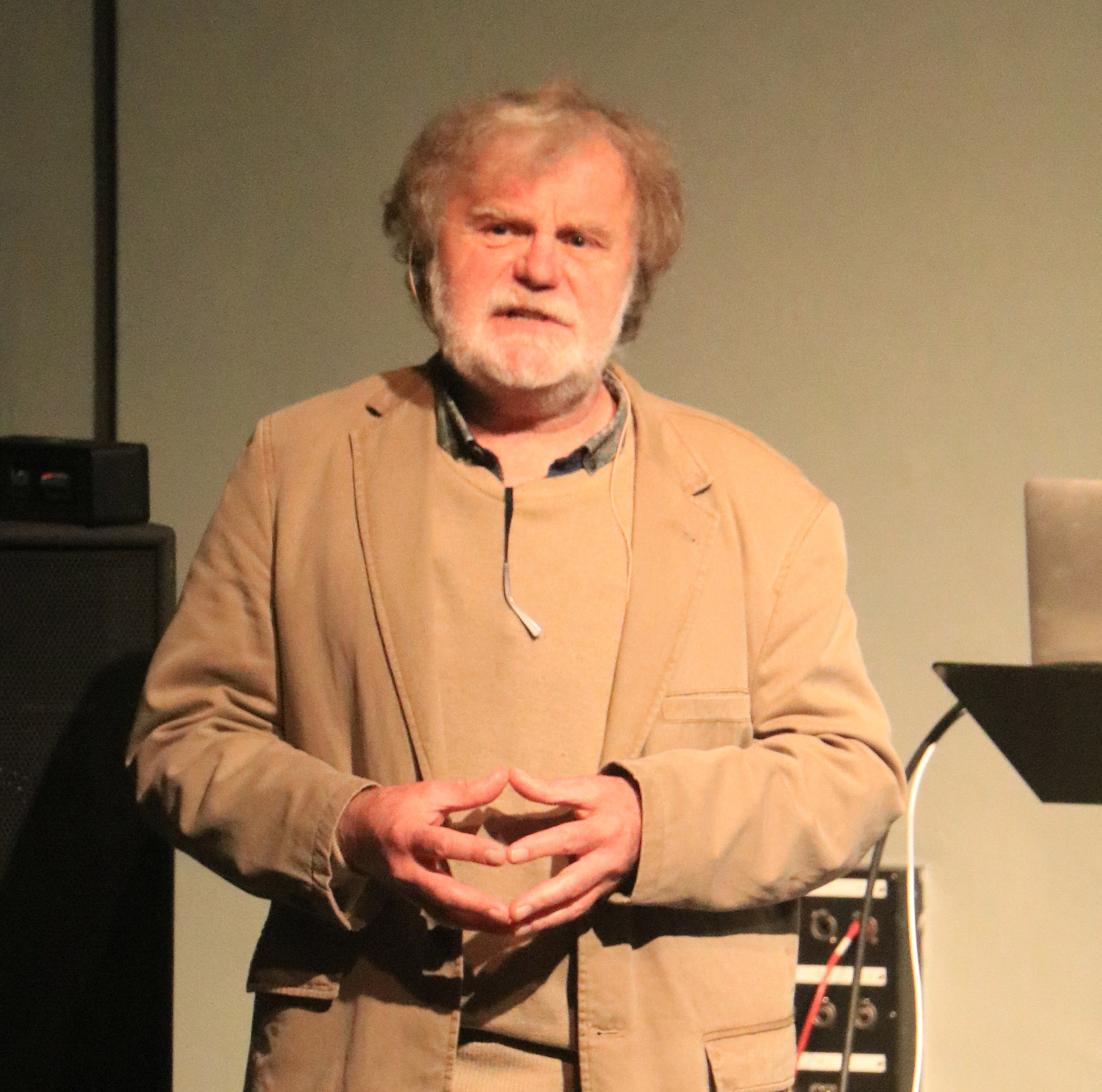
- Dickinson in 2019
- Occupations: Climber, adventurer, film-maker

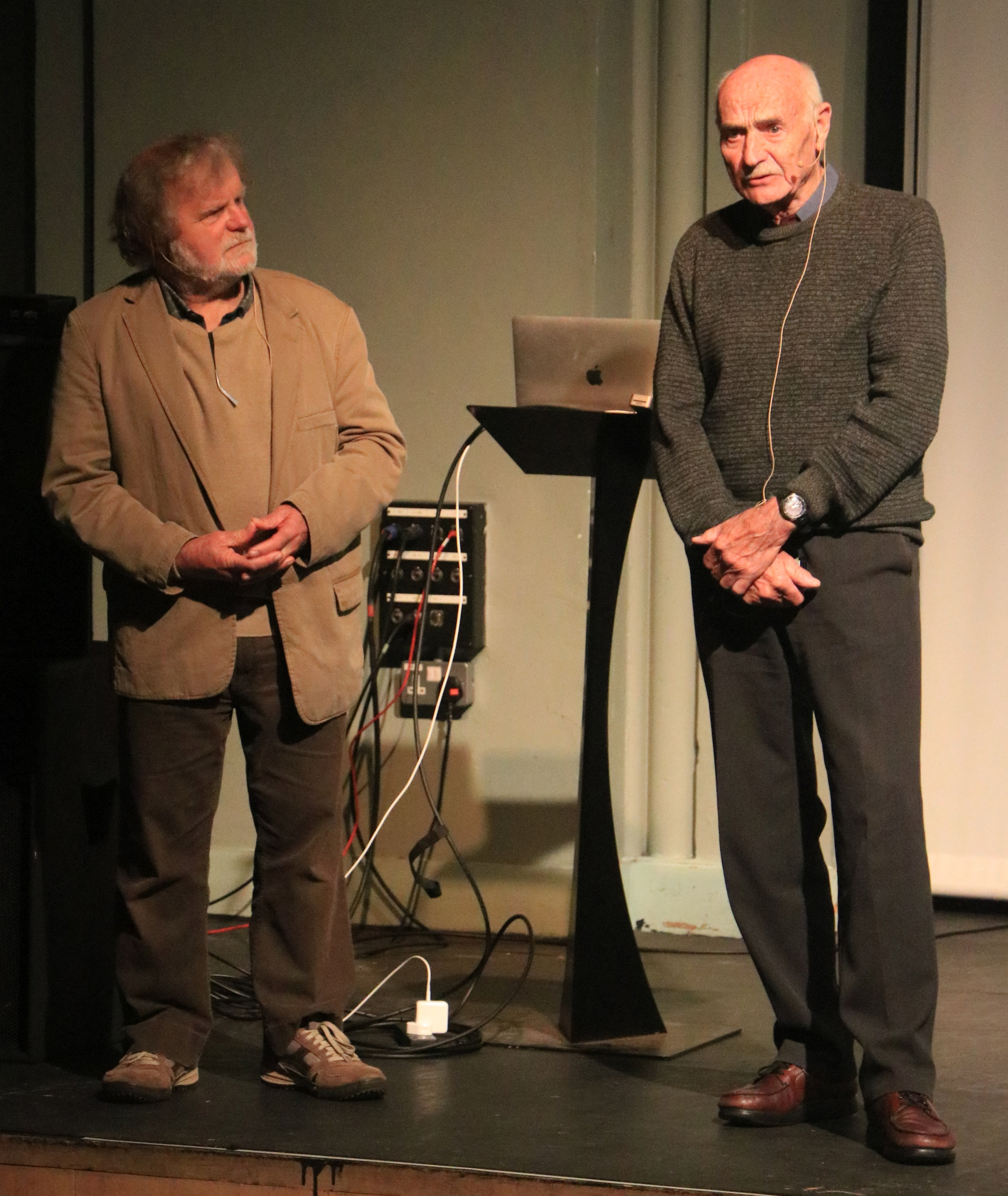
Leo Dickinson and Eric Jones (right) lecturing together at Buxton Adventure Festival in 2019.

Leo Dickinson is a British cameraman, director and adventurer. He has made 68 films, winning every major mountain and adventure film award. Dickinson specialises in mountain, ballooning, skydiving and underwater films. During his mountaineering career, Dickinson has filmed climbs on a number of mountains including Mount Everest, Cima Grande di Laveredo, Civetta, Piz Badille, Matterhorn North Face, Eiger North Face, Cerro Torre, Torre Egger, and in 1991 filmed the first ever hot air balloon ascent over Everest. Dickinson has authored three books detailing stories of his career: Filming the Impossible, Anything is Possible and Ballooning over Everest. Dickinson is renowned for his use of unique camera angles and holds several world records, including as skydiving into the world's highest platform (on Everest). Dickinson is a keen skydiver, with over 3500 skydives completed, and holds numerous records, including skydiving with the largest single number of naked women at one time.

== Personal life ==
Dickinson was born in 1946 in Lancashire, United Kingdom. He attended Rossall Public School, during which time he started rock climbing in the Lake District and North Wales. He spent his first Alpine season in the Dolomites in 1966 and in 1970 secured the backing for his first film with Yorkshire TV resulting in an award-winning film Out of the Shadows into the Sun - The first filmed ascent of the Eiger.

Dickinson is married to Mandy, an award-winning camerawoman and fellow adventurer. Mandy has helped on Leo's films since 1981, and in 1989 became British Skydiving Champion and is now a commercial balloon pilot working for Virgin.

== Awards ==
Award	Location	Year
Film Festival Grand Prix	Les Diablerets, Switzerland	1976
Emmy Nomination	USA	1978
Best Film of Festival	Banff, Canada	1978
Blue Ribbon Award	New York, USA	1978
Adventure Class Award	Telluride, USA	1979
Grand Prix du Festival	Paris, France	1979
Film Journalists Jury Award	Plagne, France	1979
Best Outdoor Film	Banff, Canada	1979
Best Photograph Award	Trento, Italy	1979
Silver Triglav	Kranji, Yugosalavia	1979
Best Film Mountain Sports	San Sebastian, Spain	1979
Duabke D'Or	Les Diablerets, Switzerland	1979
Prize du Public	Les Diablerets, Switzerland	1979
Best Expedition Film	Telluride, USA	1979
Best Expedition Film	Les Diablerets, Switzerland	1979
Best Expedition Film	Banff, Canada	1979
Silver Gentian	Trento, Italy	1979
Award of Honour	Telluride, USA	1980
Best Film on Mountaineering	Telluride, USA	1981
Best Film on Mountaineering	Madrid, Spain	1981
Sid Roberts Award	Madrid, Spain	1982
Prize of the Public	Les Diablerets, Switzerland	1982
Best Mountain Sports Film	Telluride, USA	1983
Best Gravity Sports Film	Gravity Sports Festival, USA	1983
Best Gravity Sports Film	Kendal, UK	1985
Best Mountaineering film	Telluride, USA	1985
Best Mountaineering film	Trento, Italy	1985
Grand Prize	Gravity Sports Festival, USA	1985
Best Film Mountain Sport	Florida, USA	1985
Best Film	Kendal, UK	1985
Best whitewater Film	Telluride, USA	1985
Best Adventure Film	Film Festival, Poland	1987
Best Adventure Film	St. Hilaire, France	1987
World Record	Everest, Himalayas	1991
Silver Gentian Award	Trento, Italy	1993
World Medal	New York, USA	1996
Grande Prize	Torino, Italy	2003
World Record	Everest, Himalayas	2009
