= Ludwig Gramminger =

German mountain climber

Ludwig Gramminger, also known as "Wiggerl" Gramminger (June 11, 1906 – August 28, 1997) was a German Alpinist and one of the pioneers of modern mountain rescue techniques. He was born in Munich. In 1925 he joined the Alpine mountain rescue service. A skilled climber, he pioneered the use of stretch rail and the use of steel rope to lower one of the rescuers to the base of the wall. He also pioneered the so-called Gramminger seat named after him. One of the better-publicised uses of his technique was during the 1957 rescue of an Italian climber, Claudio Corti, from the North Wall of the Eiger. Gramminger died in Munich, aged 91.
