= Toni Kurz =

German mountaineer

- Toni Kurz, 1936

Personal information
- Nationality: German
- Born: 13 January 1913 Berchtesgaden, Bavaria, German Empire
- Died: 22 July 1936 (aged 23) Eiger, Switzerland

Climbing career
- Known for: Eiger north face

Toni Kurz (13 January 1913 – 22 July 1936) was a German mountain climber active in the 1930s. He died in 1936 during an attempt to climb the then-unclimbed north face of the Eiger with his partner Andreas Hinterstoisser.

== Biography ==
Toni Kurz was born on 13 January 1913 in Berchtesgaden, Bavaria, Germany, where he was raised. He completed a brief apprenticeship as a pipefitter before joining the German Wehrmacht in 1934 as a professional soldier. Together with his childhood friend Andreas Hinterstoisser, he made numerous first ascents of peaks in the Berchtesgaden Alps, including some of the most difficult climbs of that time. The two young men climbed the southwest wall of the Berchtesgadener Hochthron in 1934, and the south wall of the straight pillar in 1936. They also made first ascents in the Reiter Alpe on the German–Austrian border, and of the direct southern route up the Watzmannkinder, part of the Watzmann, in 1935.

In July 1936, Kurz and Hinterstoisser left Berchtesgaden, where they were serving in the military, and travelled by bicycle to Kleine Scheidegg, Switzerland to attempt the then unclimbed north face of the Eiger. While on the mountain, they met up with two Austrian climbers—Edi Rainer and Willy Angerer—and the four decided to continue their attempt together.

During the ascent, Angerer was injured by falling rocks loosened by the warmth of the rising sun as they crossed the first ice field. As a result of Angerer's worsening condition and their slow progress across the second ice field, they abandoned the attempt on the Eiger and decided to descend. A further challenge arose when Kurz and his fellow climbers failed to retrace their route across the area now known as the Hinterstoisser Traverse and had to climb downwards. As the result of another avalanche, Hinterstoisser's anchor became dislodged causing him to fall to his death. Angerer, who was climbing below Kurz, was struck by a falling boulder, dying instantly and causing his body to fall and catch at the end of the running line where it remained suspended. Edi Rainer, the climber who had been securing the other two, was violently pulled against the wall by the weight of Angerer's body. Rainer was struck in the face by the dislodged anchor shattering his jaw and entangling Rainer where he died minutes later of asphyxiation. Kurz, now the only surviving climber, remained suspended by a single rope with the cliff wall out of reach.

Later that day, amid worsening weather, a rescue team attempted to reach Kurz from below, ascending by means of the railway tunnel that ran through the mountain, the Jungfraubahn. They could not reach Kurz due to the severity of the storm and were forced to leave Kurz dangling unprotected and exposed to the blizzard for the entire night. The next day, the team again attempted to effect a rescue; Kurz himself made the effort, despite a frozen hand due to losing a glove, to abseil down the face of the mountain and reach the team. To accomplish this, he first had to cut loose the dead body of Angerer hanging below him, then climb up and cut loose Rainer's body. To increase the length of his rope, he unraveled it and tied the three strands end-to-end, this entire process took five hours. He then lowered the rope to the waiting rescuers, who attached their own rope, strong enough for the abseil.

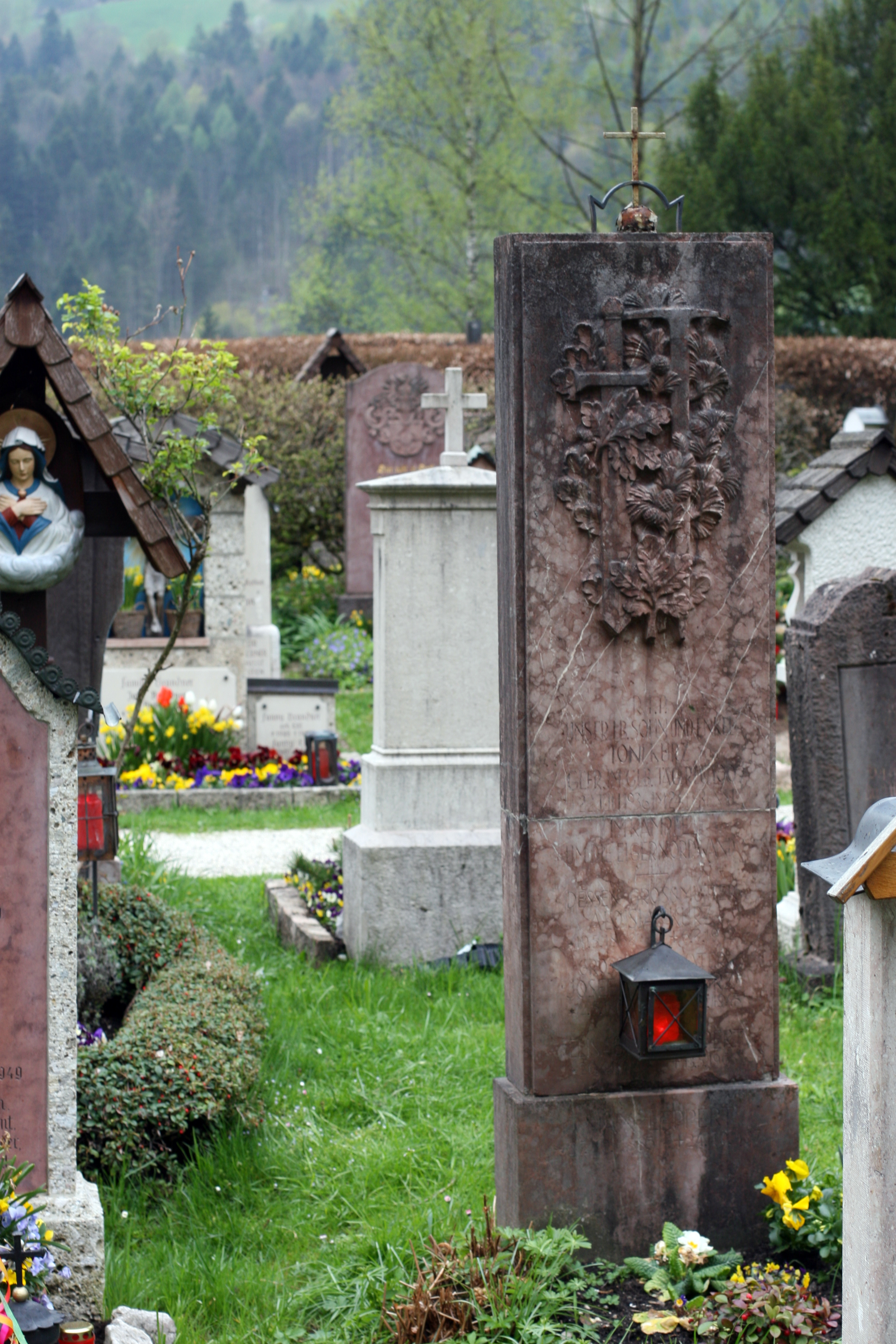
Kurz's grave in Berchtesgaden, Germany

The mountain guides only had one long rope – 60 metres – with them. Hans Schlunegger just put it between his back and his rucksack (not into his rucksack) to save some time. This was not an unusual practice for them. Unfortunately when he made a sudden movement the rope dropped and fell down to the foot of the wall. To try to reach the required length, the team combined two shorter ropes, but the combined length still fell short. Kurz pulled up their rope, fixed it, and began his abseiling descent. He was stopped a mere couple of meters above his rescuers by the knot. To abseil any further he would have had to raise himself enough to release the tension on the knot and let it pass through his gear. Desperately, Kurz tried to move himself past the knot, but in vain. Facing the futility of his situation, he said only "Ich kann nicht mehr" ("I can't go [on] anymore") and died of hypothermia shortly after. His body was later recovered by a German team.

== Legacy ==
The tragic story became well known after publication of Heinrich Harrer's classic 1960 book The White Spider and was more recently covered by Joe Simpson's book (and Emmy-winning TV documentary) The Beckoning Silence, as well as the 2008 German dramatic movie North Face.

The Dutch doom-rock band The Wounded wrote a song about Toni Kurz named "White Spider". It is released on their album The sky is yours from 2024.
