= Claudio Corti (climber) =

Italian mountaineer

Claudio Corti (1928 – 3 February 2010) was a mountain climber from Olginate, Italy. He is most famous for his 1957 effort to climb the 1938 route on the North Face of the Eiger, during which his party was stranded and a massive rescue operation was organized. Corti became the first person to be successfully rescued from the Face from above, but his partner, Stefano Longhi, died on the Face before rescuers could reach him.

== 1957 Eiger attempt and rescue ==
In early August 1957, Corti, 29 years old, and Longhi, 44, both Italians from Lecco, began an attempt to climb the North Face of the Eiger by the standard Heckmair route. A German team consisting of Günther Nothdurft and Franz Mayer, starting after the Italians, caught up with Corti and Longhi on the Face and climbed alongside them for multiple days, even briefly joining them on a common rope. Despite generally suitable weather conditions, and though Nothdurft had previously set several speed records in the Alps, both parties climbed unusually slowly, spending at least five bivouacs together on the Face. According to Corti, the Germans had lost a rucksack containing critical equipment near the beginning of their climb but had nevertheless elected to continue, and Nothdurft later became weak with illness and had to be cared for by Mayer, which severely hampered both teams' progress.

The situation took a fatal turn when, on or near the "White Spider", about 400 metres (1,300 ft) below the summit, Longhi fell more than 30 metres (98 ft) down the Face, though he remained roped to Corti and ended up dangling off an overhang above a small ledge. Corti severely burned his hands trying to arrest the rope as it slid through them, and was also disoriented from having earlier been hit in the head by a falling stone. The other three climbers were unable to hoist Longhi back up the overhang, and he was forced to bivouac on the ledge. Corti, too, was no longer fit to climb, so the Germans reportedly left him all of their gear and then continued to the summit, from which they intended to descend to get help. Corti bivouacked for several more nights at his own stance near the top of the "Spider" while Longhi remained far below him. Nothdurft and Mayer apparently successfully summited, but then mysteriously disappeared.

Corti, who spent over a week on the Face, became the centre of a great deal of controversy. He could not produce a coherent story about what happened on the Face, and this, coupled with a sensationalistic press campaign and the opinions expressed by Heinrich Harrer in The White Spider, created an atmosphere of deep suspicion around him. He was vilified for what Harrer described as incompetence, lack of preparedness, and an unfriendly climbing ethic, and was even accused by others of deliberately pushing Nothdurft and Mayer off the Face and stealing their gear. However, he was completely cleared when the dead Germans' bodies were found in 1961 on the opposite side of the mountain, on the normal route of descent along the West Flank, apparently the victims of an avalanche.

The rescue operation itself is known as one of the greatest of all time. The operation crossed international boundaries and involved more than 50 people, all of whom were volunteers. The local Swiss guides received a lot of criticism for not responding, as it was their policy not to respond to parties trapped on the Face because they generally thought it foolish to climb the Face and that a rescue would risk the lives of the rescuers. The operation was also the first successful rescue on the Eiger from above, and one of the first uses of a steel-cable winch apparatus designed by Ludwig Gramminger. The winch was placed on the summit, and German guide Alfred Hellepart was lowered on the cable to Corti's position, where Corti was then strapped to Hellepart's back, and the pair was hoisted up. Though rescuers were able to communicate with Longhi, still stranded on the ledge, a break in the weather forced them to postpone his rescue until the next day, by which time he had died of exposure.

Jack Olsen investigated the rescue and interviewed Corti in the early 1960s, using his research as the basis for The Climb up to Hell.

In 2008, Italian writer Giorgio Spreafico released a book on the 1957 Eiger tragedy, Il prigioniero dell'Eiger (The Eiger Prisoner), which contains a long interview with Claudio Corti and a detailed historical reconstruction of the events.

== Other climbing ==
The Eiger controversy in some way overshadowed the rest of Corti's mountaineering career. Corti climbed extensively in the Alps, becoming the first person to open two new routes on Piz Badile, and making early repeats of important routes. While not reaching the summit, he had an important role in the successful 1973-74 expedition of the Ragni di Lecco to climb the west face of Cerro Torre, a climb considered by some the first true ascent of the Torre.
