= Andreas Hinterstoisser =

German mountaineer

- Andreas Hinterstoisser, 1936

Personal information
- Nationality: German
- Born: 3 October 1914 Bad Reichenhall, Bavaria, German Empire
- Died: 21 July 1936 (aged 21) Eiger, Switzerland

Climbing career
- Named routes: Hinterstoisser Traverse

Andreas Hinterstoisser (3 October 1914 – 21 July 1936) was a German mountain climber active in the 1930s. He was killed in the 1936 Eiger north face climbing disaster during an attempted summit via that route with his partner Toni Kurz. A section of the north face was later named the "Hinterstoisser Traverse" in his honor. The 2008 film North Face was based on his experience climbing the Eiger.

== Biography ==
Andreas Hinterstoisser was born on 3 October 1914 in Bad Reichenhall, Bavaria, Germany, where he was raised. He worked in a bank before joining the German Wehrmacht as a professional soldier in 1935. Together with his childhood friend Toni Kurz, he made numerous first ascents of peaks in the Berchtesgaden Alps, including some of the most difficult climbs of that time.

The two young men climbed the southwest wall of the Berchtesgadener Hochthron in 1934, and the south wall of the straight pillar in 1936. They also made first ascents in the Reiter Alpe on the German–Austrian border, and of the direct southern route up the Watzmannkinder in the Watzmann in 1935.

== Eiger North face ==
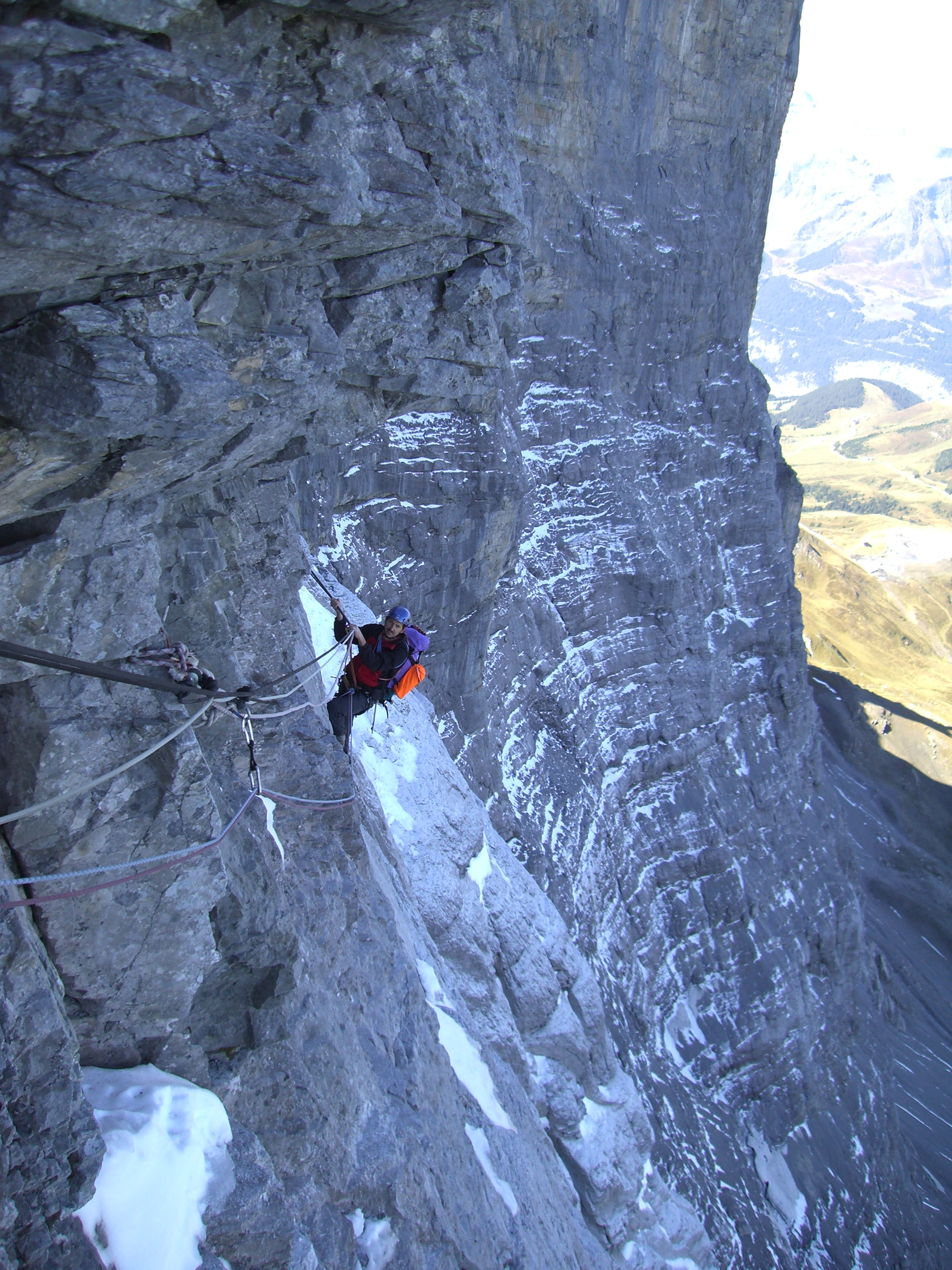
Hinterstoisser Traverse, 2007

In 1936, he was on the four-man team making the second attempt to scale the north face of the Eiger. He was renowned as one of the best rock climbers of his time and is held in high esteem to this day.

He cleverly managed to traverse a vertical slab of very icy rock—a feat that made the rest of the attempt on the Eiger possible—by climbing up on the slab and then lowering himself to execute a pendulum, or 'tension traverse', to the other side, where he secured a horizontal fixed rope to enable his companions to cross the unclimbable slab. This part of the route became known as the Hinterstoisser Traverse in his honour.

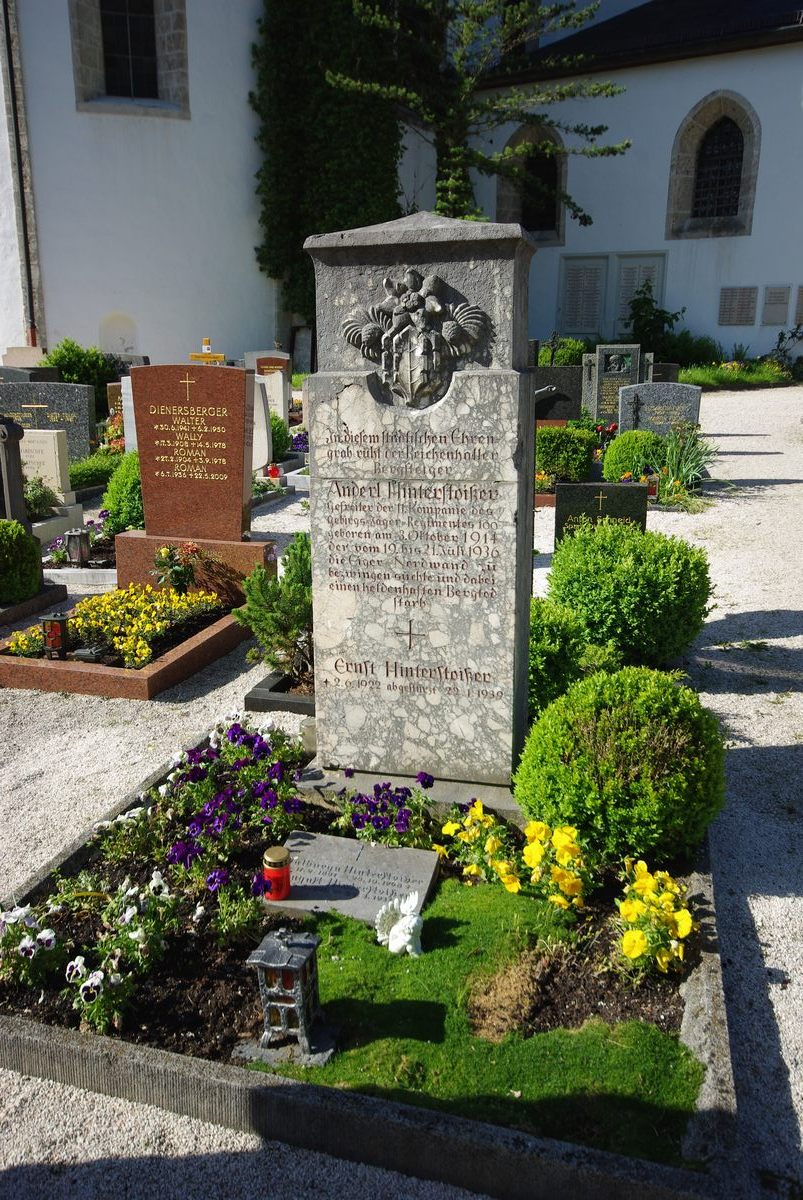
Hinterstoisser's grave at Friedhof Bad Reichenhall, Germany

During a retreat from the wall, due both to an injury suffered by one of his comrades and to the severe weather, Hinterstoisser could not recross the traverse to safety because the group had previously removed the rope that had helped them across. The group decided to abseil down the vertical face (the great rock barrier) to the base of the mountain. Contact was made with a railway guard halfway down the descent during which the climbers claimed everything was all right (perhaps out of pride or the knowledge that they were close to safety).

However, as Hinterstoisser set up the last stage of the descent an avalanche came down the mountain, wiping out Hinterstoisser, who had unclipped from the group. He fell to his death and was found at the bottom of the mountain days later. The rest of the group suffered the same fate: Willy Angerer was killed by the impact; Edi Rainer was asphyxiated from the weight of the rope holding his comrades; and Toni Kurz died from exposure the following day, despite having made contact with rescuers.

== Legacy ==
The tragic story became well known after publication of Heinrich Harrer's classic 1960 book The White Spider and was more recently covered by Joe Simpson's book (and Emmy-winning TV documentary), The Beckoning Silence, as well as the 2008 German dramatic movie North Face.
