= Eric Jones (climber) =

Welsh mountaineer

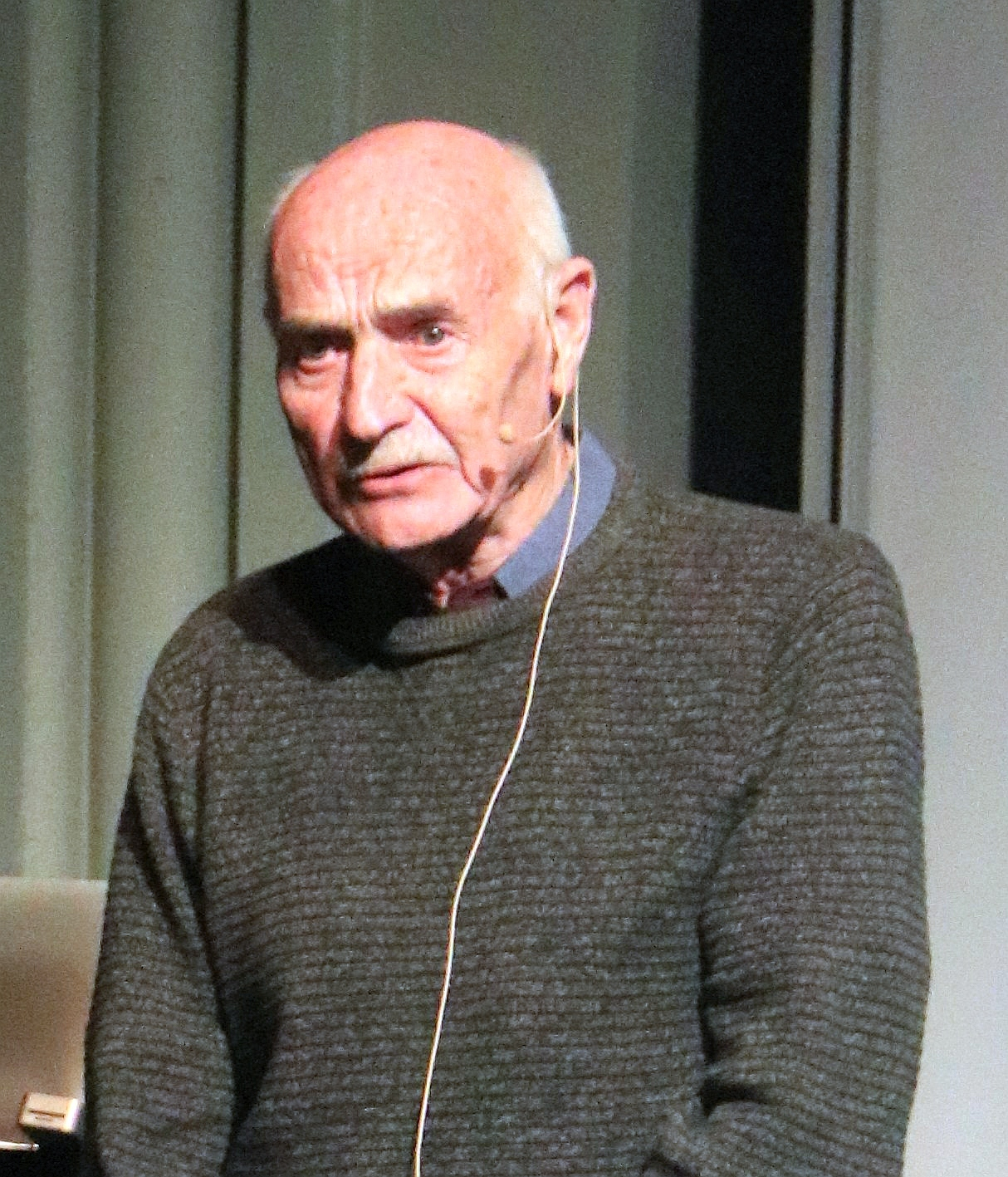
- Born: 1936 (age 89–90)
- Known for: solo climbing, skydiving, BASE jumping.

Eric Jones (born 1936) is a Welsh solo climber, skydiver and BASE jumper.

He is best known for the first British solo ascent of the north face of the Eiger in 1981, and for his climbs on the Matterhorn and South Col on Mount Everest. In 1986, he became the first person to BASE jump from the Eiger.

== Early life ==
Raised on a farm near Ruthin in north Wales, he attended Derwen primary school, transferring at age 11 to Ysgol Brynhyfryd in Ruthin. As a boy he was interested in parachuting and skydiving, and later wanted to sign up with the Parachute Regiment. However, an earlier injury - a result of a motorbike accident - led to his joining the Military Police whilst on his two-year National Service.

Jones took up skydiving in 1961 and a year later, at the age of 26, began climbing. He climbed extensively in Snowdonia and the Lake District, followed by climbs in Italy. He took up solo climbing when his climbing partner became less available, and found that it gave him the freedom to move quicker, though also brought greater risks.

== Exploits ==
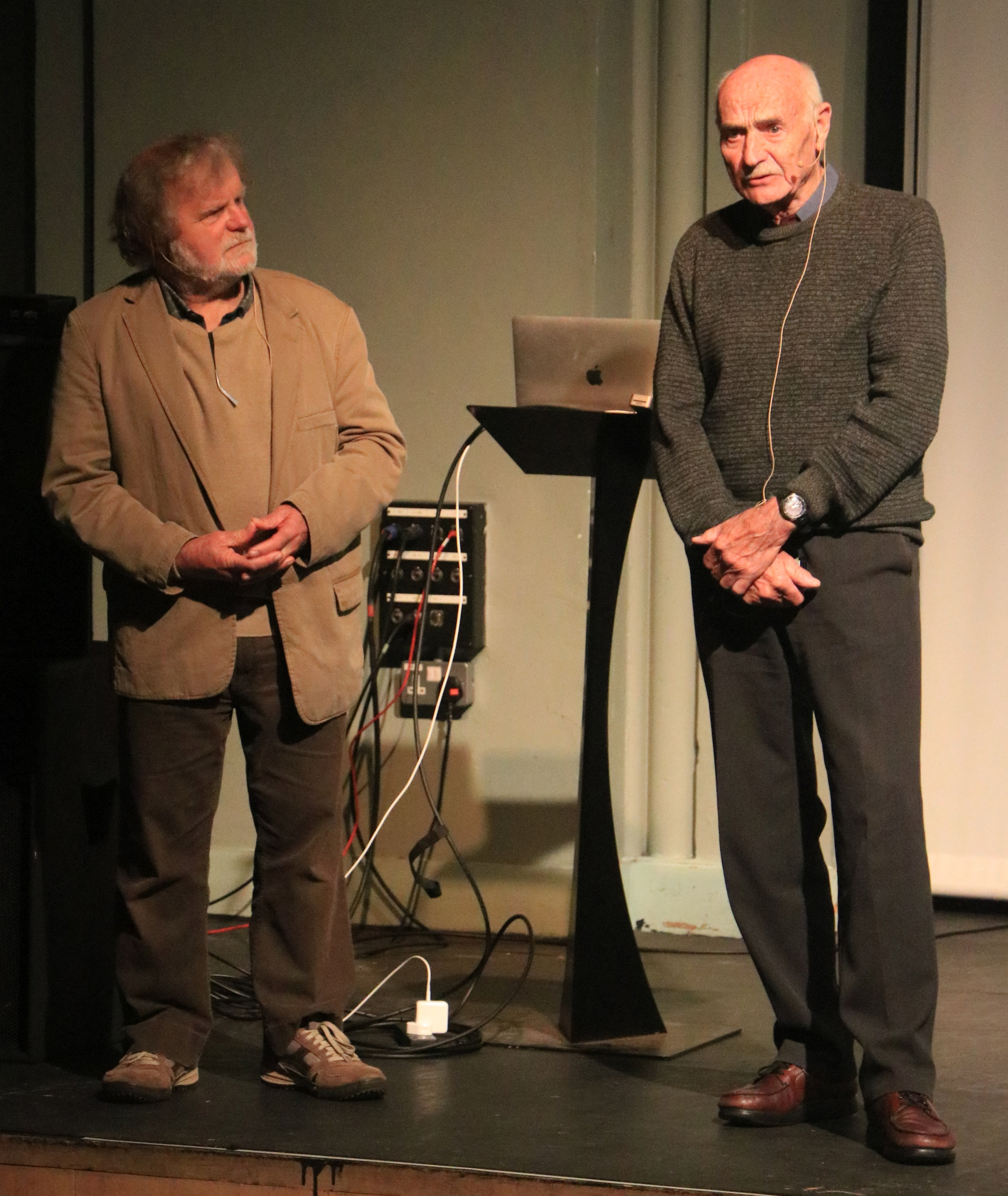
Leo Dickinson (left) and Eric Jones (right), lecturing in 2019 on their shared adventures.

In 1969, Jones ascended the Bonatti Pillar on the Dru solo, and in 1971, he was the first person to climb the Central Pillar of Brouillard on the south ridge of Mont Blanc.

Many of his exploits, such as the Eiger ascent and the Matterhorn ascent, have been filmed by award-winning cameraman Leo Dickinson. Jones and Dickinson, with two other climbers, made the first complete film of the Eiger climb in 1970, with Jones' first British solo ascent following in 1981, resulting in the acclaimed film Eiger Solo.

Dickinson, who wrote a book called Filming the Impossible, also worked with Jones when he filmed Ice Climbing with Eric Jones in Switzerland.

Jones was filming Reinhold Messner and Peter Habeler when they made the first ascent of Everest without oxygen in 1978. He reached the South Col at 7,900m but did not continue to the summit because of concerns about frostbite.

Jones worked side by side with Sean Connery on the film Five Days One Summer, where fellow climber Paul Nunn worked as a stunt double for Connery.

He has been involved in a number of other film productions, from both sides of the camera.

== Skydiving and basejumping ==
As a skydiver, Jones jumped onto the North Pole and down the east face of Cerro Torre in Patagonia. In 1991, as a member of a four-man team, he flew two hot air balloons over Mount Everest, an exploit which gained three entries in the Guinness Book of Records.

Having jumped from balloons as a skydiver, Jones started BASE jumping (jumping from a fixed object - natural or man-made) at the age of 50, having met renowned jumper Moe Villetto. Combining jumping with his other interests, his first BASE jump was off the Eiger, the first person to do this. He made a number of spectacular jumps from buildings and bridges in the United States, but is renowned for his jump off the Angel Falls in Venezuela, shown in the documentary film The Man Who Jumped To Earth (UK, 1998) directed by Steve Robinson. At the age of 61, he is the oldest person to have done this. His jump into the Cave of Swallows in Mexico, directed by Llion Iwan, was shown in the documentary The Man Who Jumped Beneath The Earth (2003).

His self-proclaimed motto is "Life is adventure or nothing at all".

== Personal life ==
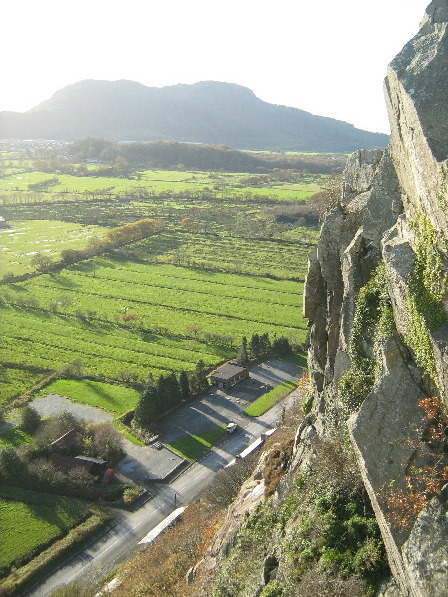
Eric Jones' cafe at Tremadog (a former filling station), viewed from Craig Bwlch y moch.

He is married to Ann, and has two children. Featured in the Lifestyle section of The Independent in January 2008, he said :

After we had kids, people would ask if I wasn't being irresponsible for doing all these things but my take is that everything in life involves risk and it's about weighing up those risks. When people go into climbing, they can start out with a macho attitude but you learn to be humble and realise you're there on nature's sufferance. You don't conquer a mountain and if you go out there with that attitude, it will bite you back.

For three decades he has owned and run a small cafe (Eric Jones' Cafe) and campsite at Tremadog, near Porthmadog, which is popular with climbers and bikers alike. Some of his exploits can be seen in photos on the walls. In 2016 he put these properties up for sale.

== Later life ==
Jones is regarded by many of his peers as Britain's most successful solo climber. An unassuming man, he still walks, climbs, skis and jumps, and a recent documentary by S4C screened in 2007/8 called Alpau Eric Jones saw him revisiting the Alps. He also still gives occasional lectures on his experiences, and has in the past co-presented with Dickinson.

In 2015 he published his autobiography, entitled A Life on the Edge.

In August 2019 a BBC2 documentary entitled The Last Climb: Eric Jones, recounted much of his life, and featured his dreams, aged 82, of one final solo climb, namely the Delago Tower, part of the Italian Dolomites, which he had first climbed in the 1960s.
