= Willy Angerer =

Austrian mountaineer

Personal information
- Nationality: Austrian
- Born: 1905
- Died: 21 July 1936 (aged 30–31) Eiger, Bernese Alps, Switzerland

Willy Angerer (c. 1905 – 21 July 1936) was an Austrian mountaineer. He was one of four mountaineers who died in the 1936 Eiger north face climbing disaster, along with Toni Kurz, Andreas Hinterstoisser and Eduard Rainer. At 31, Angerer was the oldest of the four climbers who died.

== Background ==
The north-face of the Eiger was considered to be the last great Alpine problem in the 1930s. In the summer of 1935 two Bavarian climbers died attempting the climb despite a rescue attempt. Four climbers, two Austrians and two Germans, arrived in Alpiglen, a settlement of Grindelwald, in July 1936, intending to climb independently.

Angerer was an illegal member of the Sturmabteilung, which was banned in Austria at the time.

== The climb ==
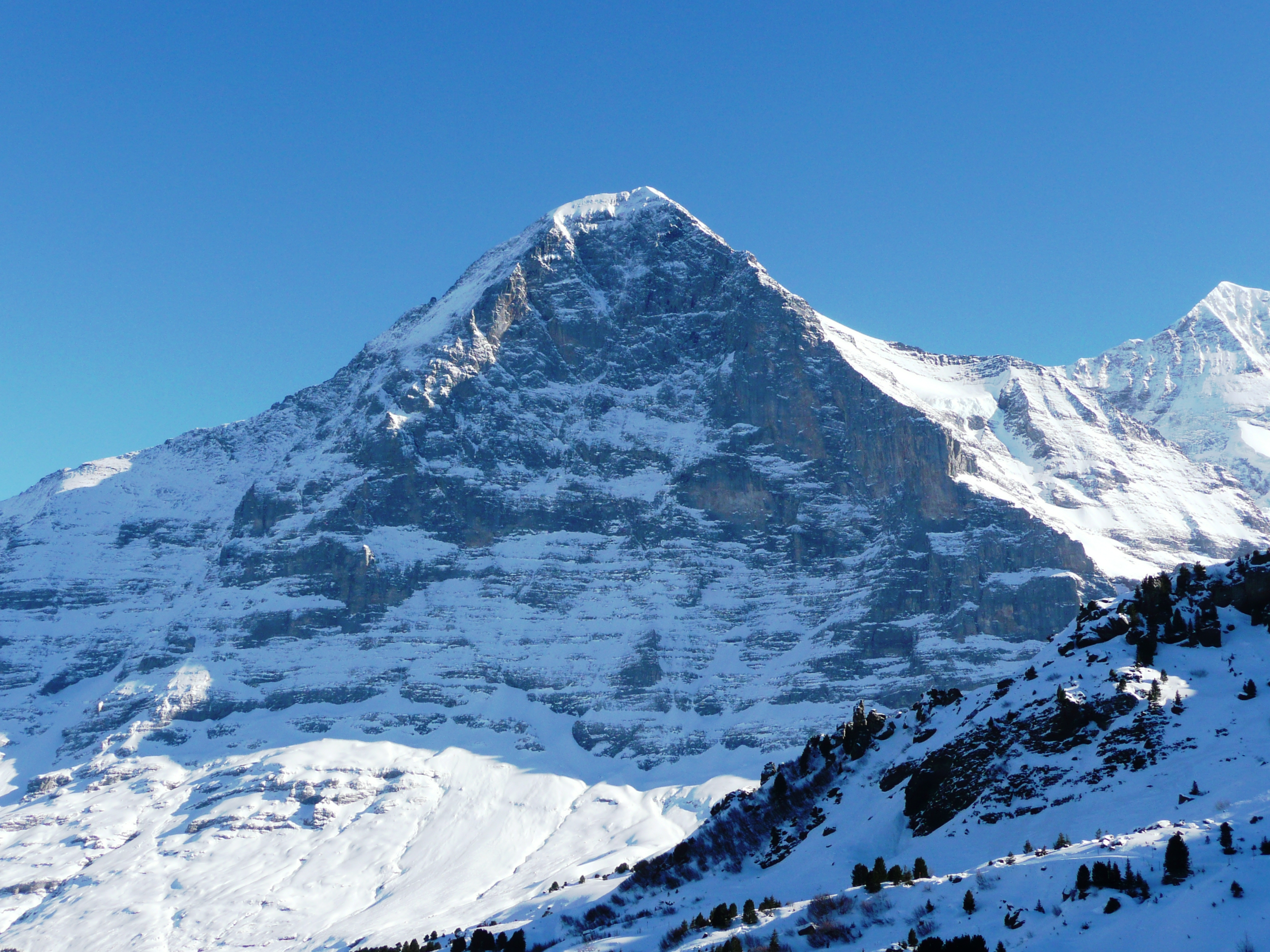
North face of the Eiger where Angerer and his colleagues died

The two Austrians, Angerer and Rainer, reconnoitered the route for a good line on 6 July because the previous attempt by Karl Mehringer and Max Sedlmeyer had taken two days to climb the first 700 meters and their conditions were not good, so retreated. On 18 July Angerer and Rainer returned to the mountain to restart their attempt. A rock fall injured Angerer in the head on 20 July 1936, forcing them to descend. However, when they reached the very difficult Hinterstoisser traverse, now ice covered due to the worsening weather conditions, from which the rope had been removed on the way up, they were unable to retreat through to safety and were forced to descend straight down. They were hit by an avalanche which carried Hinterstoisser away, while Angerer was violently crushed against the wall and strangled to death by the rope around his neck. Rainer, being pressed against the rock wall with the rope tight around his waist, froze to death. The only survivor, Toni Kurz, died the next day, within a few meters above his rescuers, but inaccessible.

Kurz was the last to die, hanging in his harness a few meters from a tunnel opening where a rescue team tried in vain to help him. With the mounting deaths on the Eiger's north face, the German press name "Nordwand" (North wall) was soon punned in sensational reports as "Mordwand" that translates in English as "murder wall".

== Legacy ==
Angerer and his fellow alpinists' tragedy became well known after the publication of Heinrich Harrer's classic 1960 book The White Spider. The Edward Whymper disaster, during which four alpinists died, on the first ascent of the Matterhorn seventy-one years before, had formerly been the most publicised Alpine disaster. The 1936 event was covered by Joe Simpson's 2003 book (and 2007 Emmy-winning TV documentary), The Beckoning Silence, as well as in the 2008 German dramatic movie North Face.
