= 1936 Eiger climbing disaster =

Mountaineering disaster

Coordinates: 46.5843675°N 7.9217514°E

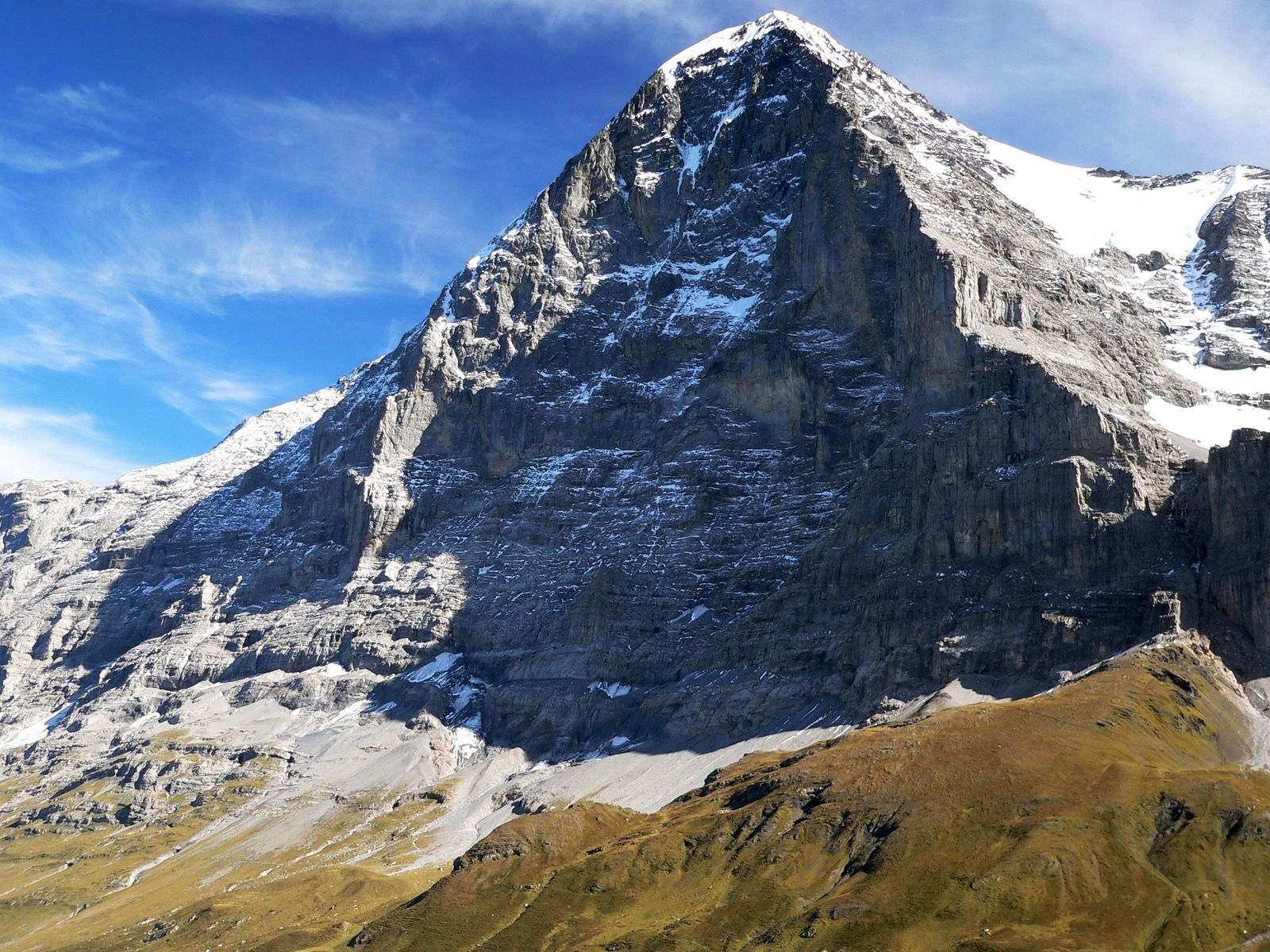
The north face of the Eiger, where the disaster unfolded

In July 1936, a team of four climbers died while attempting to ascend the north face of the Eiger mountain in Switzerland.

== Background ==
After a deadly and unsuccessful German attempt in 1935, ten climbers from Austria and Germany travelled to the still-unclimbed north face of the Eiger in 1936, but, before serious summit attempts could get underway, one climber was killed during a training climb. The weather was so bad that after waiting for a change and seeing none on the way, several climbers gave up. Only four remained: two Bavarians, Andreas Hinterstoisser and Toni Kurz, and two Austrians, Willy Angerer and Edi Rainer.

== Ascent and retreat ==
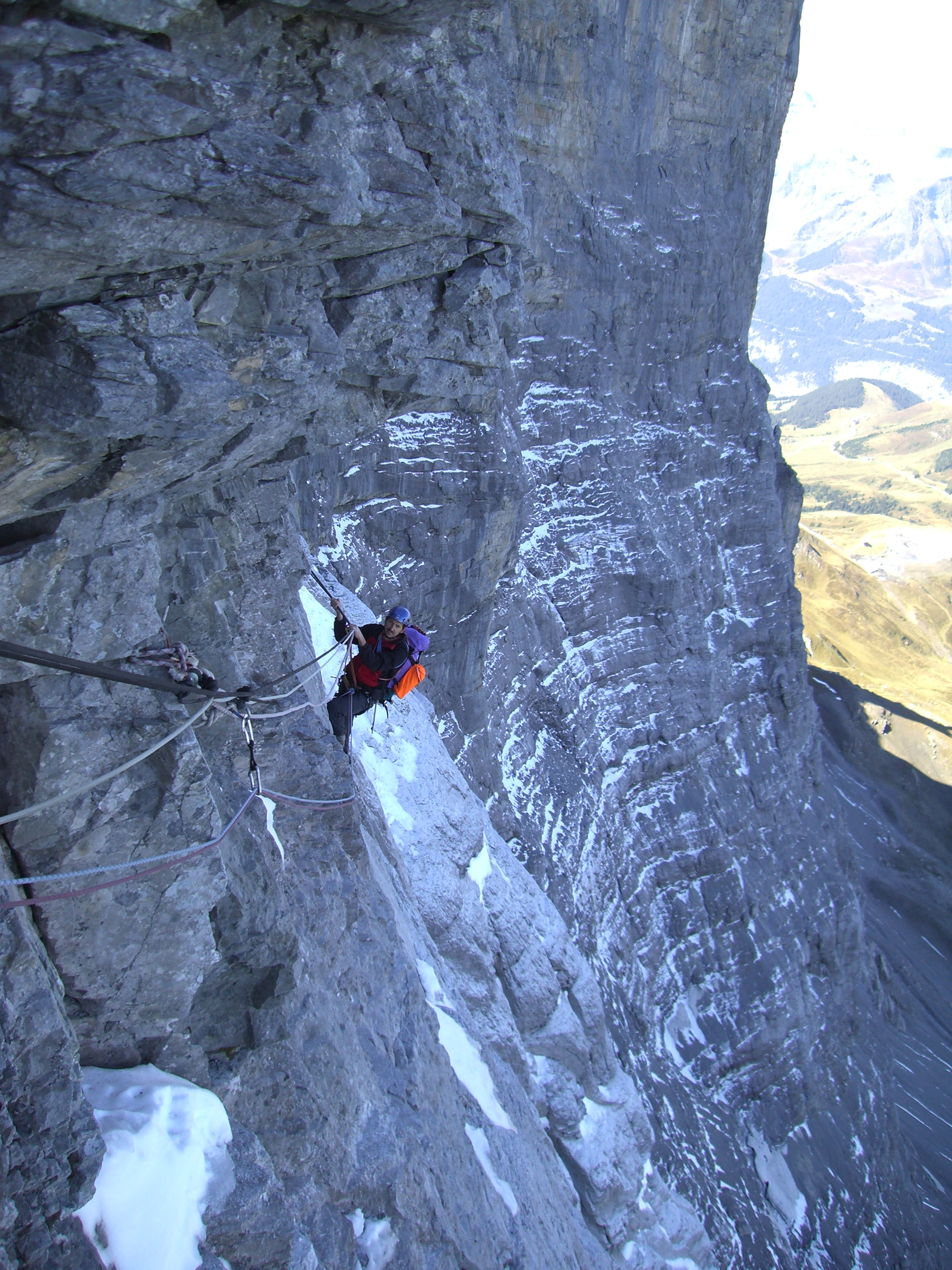
The Hinterstoisser traverse

The weather improved and they made preliminary explorations of the lowest part of the face. Hinterstoisser accidentally fell 37 metres (121 ft) but was not injured. A few days later, the four men began ascending the north face. They climbed quickly, but on the second day the weather changed; clouds came down and allowed observers on the ground only intermittent visibility of the climbers on the face. On the second day, the party was bombarded by rockfall, a notorious problem on the north face route. Angerer was hit just below the shoulder blade and injured. It is said that he tried to continue climbing, but the expedition had to be stopped for the night.

The climbing resumed on the following day, when, during a break in the clouds, the party was observed descending. Later, it would be learned that the group had no choice but to retreat, since Angerer had suffered more serious injuries than initially assessed. The party became stuck on the face when they could not recross a difficult traverse – which became known as the Hinterstoisser traverse – from which they had pulled the rope during their ascent. Exhausted on their third day of climbing, with two days of bad weather, Hinterstoisser still tried for hours to cross the traverse, which was now covered in verglas. On the way up, Hinterstoisser had used a technique called a "tension traverse", where a rope is fixed and kept taut, allowing the lead climber to "lean" on it for balance. However, this technique cannot be used when descending.

The weather worsened, and falling rocks, snow, and water could be seen from the town. The group decided to abseil from the lower lip of the First Ice Field down the vertical face (the great rock barrier). A ledge ran along the wall of rock, which, if they could get to it, would lead them to the Stollenloch, an entrance to the train tunnel. As belay devices had not yet been invented, they rappelled using the Dülfersitz method. Contact was made with a railway guard at the Eigerwand railway station halfway down the descent. During their exchange, the climber claimed everything had been going all right (perhaps out of pride and knowledge that they were very close to safety). However, as Hinterstoisser set up the last abseil of the descent, an avalanche came down the mountain, taking Hinterstoisser, who had unclipped from the group, with it. He was found at the bottom of the mountain days later. Angerer also fell and was killed when his body hit the rock face, while Rainer quickly asphyxiated from the weight of the rope around his diaphragm. Only Kurz survived the avalanche, hanging on the rope with his dead comrades.

== Rescue attempt ==
Late on the third day, three Swiss guides started a rescue attempt from the Eigerwand Station. They failed to reach Kurz but came within shouting distance and learned what had happened. Kurz explained the fate of his companions: one had fallen down the face, another was frozen above him, and the third had fractured his skull in falling and was hanging on the rope below him.

In the morning, the three guides returned, traversing the face again from a hole near the Eigerwand Station despite avalanche-prone conditions. Toni Kurz was still alive but almost helpless. After four nights exposed to the elements, one of his hands and his arm were completely frozen. Kurz hauled himself back to the mountain face after cutting loose Angerer below him. The guides were not able to pass an unclimbable overhang that separated them from Kurz, but they managed to get a rope long enough to reach Kurz by tying two ropes together. While abseiling, however, Kurz could not get the knot that joined the two ropes to pass through his carabiner. He tried for hours to reach his rescuers, who were just a few metres below him, desperately trying to move himself past the knot, but in vain. He then began to lose consciousness. One of the guides, climbing on another's shoulders, was able to touch the tip of Kurz's crampons with the head of his ice-axe but could not reach higher. Faced with the futility of his situation, he famously said only "Ich kann nicht mehr" ("I can't [go on] anymore") and then died.

His body was later recovered by a German team.

== See also ==
- The Beckoning Silence, a 2007 documentary about the disaster
- North Face, a 2008 German film on the subject
