= Eduard Rainer =

Austrian mountaineer (1909–1936)

Personal information
- Nickname: Edi Rainer
- Nationality: Austrian
- Born: 1909
- Died: 21 July 1936 (aged 26–27) Eiger, Bernese Alps, Switzerland

Climbing career
- Known for: 1936 Eiger north face climbing disaster

Eduard Rainer (1909 – 21 July 1936) was an Austrian mountaineer. He was one of the four climbers who died in the 1936 Eiger north face climbing disaster, along with Toni Kurz, Andreas Hinterstoisser and Willy Angerer.

== Early life ==
In the early 1930s, Rainer joined the Sturmabteilung, which had been banned in Austria. In October 1933, he was sentenced to 14 days in jail for working for the Nazi Party, but later escaped from custody. Rainer moved to Germany in the spring of 1934. He received German citizenship and was accepted into the Austrian Legion. He last lived in Hesse, from where he set out on the journey to Switzerland.

== Reconnoiter ==
The two Austrians, Rainer and Angerer, also a member of the SA, knew that the German duo, Max Sedlmayer and Karl Mehringer, had spent a long time on the First Band during their fatal attempt in 1935. On 6 July 1936 Rainer and Angerer ventured out and decided to search for a line that would bring them to the Rote Fluh from where they intended to reach the First Icefield. They retreated because of the wet icy conditions.

== Eiger north face climb ==
On 18 July 1936 Eduard Rainer and his friend Willy Angerer commenced their attempt on the north face of the Eiger, which was then one of the last great Alpine north faces remaining to be conquered. At almost the same time the German mountaineers, Toni Kurz and Andreas Hinterstoisser, were making the same attempt.

The German pair were the first to reach a difficult section that required a pendulum action, called a tension traverse, to get across the steep rock face. Hinterstoisser was the one to overcome the obstacle which is why it is now known as the Hinterstoisser traverse. When the Austrian pair had come through they made a fatal mistake. They pulled the rope through leaving no possibility of reversing their route.

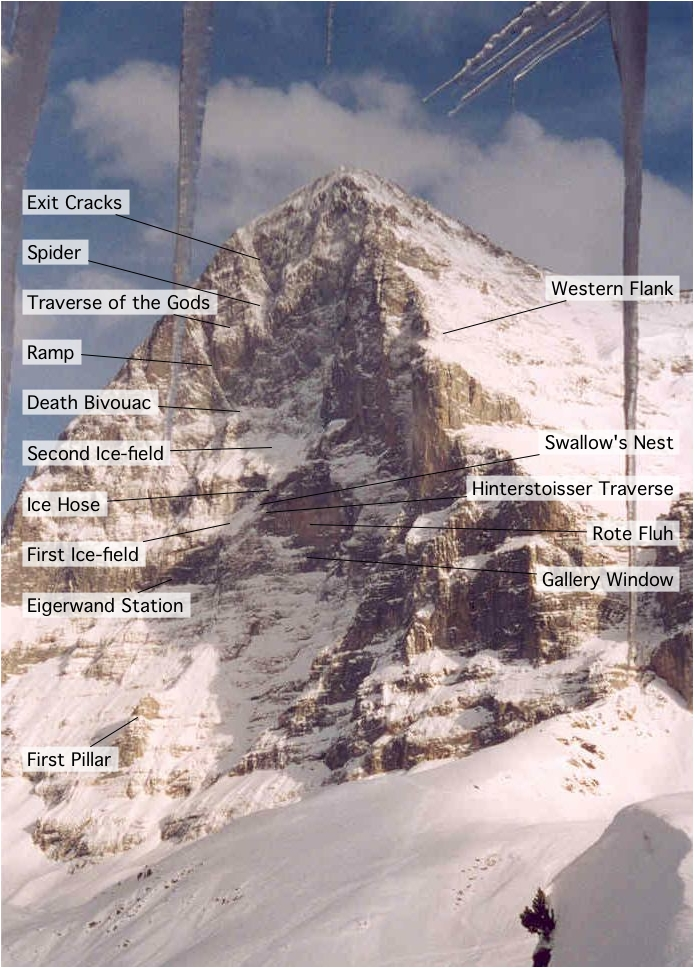
North face of Eiger with features noted

At this stage the four climbers combined into one team and continued their ascent to the "Death Bivouac", where Sedlmayer and Mehringer were last seen from Kleine Scheidegg the previous year.

During their overnight bivouac the weather turned bad and the steep wall became iced over. Despite the weather, the team continued ascending until Angerer was hit in the head by rockfall and they decided to retreat. By now the Hinterstoisser traverse was iced over and without a rope in place to aid their retreat there was no choice but to abseil down handicapped by the injured Angerer.

While abseiling, the group were hit by a stone and ice avalanche that pulled Rainer up against the piton belay where the rock shattered his chest. Neither Angerer and Hinterstoisser survived the disaster leaving only Toni Kurz alive. The following day Kurz died almost within reach of a rescue team but for his inability to pass the knotted abseil rope, that had been dropped down by rescuers, through a carabiner with his frozen fingers.

== Legacy ==
The climb is recalled in the 2007 drama documentary The Beckoning Silence inspired by climber Joe Simpson's book of the same name and again in the 2008 feature film North Face directed by Philipp Stölzl.
