= List of women's firsts =

This is a list of women's firsts noting the first time that a woman or women achieved a given historical feat. A shorthand phrase for this development is "breaking the gender barrier" or "breaking the glass ceiling." Other terms related to the glass ceiling can be used for specific fields related to those terms, such as "breaking the brass ceiling" for women in the military and "breaking the stained glass ceiling" for women clergy. Inclusion on the list is reserved for achievements by women that have significant historical impact.

== Aviation and aerospace ==
Date	Name	Milestone
June 4, 1784	Élisabeth Thible	First known woman to ride in a hot air balloon.
1805	Sophie Blanchard	First woman to pilot a hot air balloon.
March 8, 1910	Raymonde de Laroche	First woman to receive a pilot's license.
September 16, 1910	Bessica Faith Raiche	First woman in the United States accredited with flying solo in an airplane.
1910–1911	Lilian Bland	First woman in the world to design, build, and fly an aircraft.
1912	Harriet Quimby	First woman to fly across the English Channel.
1912	Rayna Kasabova	First woman to participate in a military flight during the Siege of Odrin.
1914	Eugenie Mikhailovna Shakhovskaya	First woman commissioned as a military pilot; she flew reconnaissance missions for the Czar in 1914.
1915	Marie Marvingt	First woman to fly a fighter plane in combat.
1930	Amy Johnson	First woman to fly from Britain to Australia.
1932	Amelia Earhart	First woman to fly solo across the Atlantic Ocean.
1933	Lotfia ElNadi	First African woman and first Arab woman to earn a pilot's license.
1937	Sabiha Gökçen	The first military woman to fly combat missions.
1948	Daisy Pon	The first woman aeronautical engineering graduate in Canada. A graduate of the University of Toronto.
October 17, 1951	Touria Chaoui	The first Moroccan and Maghrebi female pilot
May 18, 1953	Jacqueline Cochran	First woman to break the sound barrier.
1957	Jackie Moggridge	First woman to become a British airline captain.
June 16, 1963	Valentina Tereshkova	First woman in space.
1963	Betty Miller	First female pilot to fly solo across the Pacific Ocean.
1964	Jerrie Mock	First woman to fly solo around the world.
1964	Joan Merriam Smith	First person in history to fly solo around the world at the equator; First person to complete the longest single solo flight around the world; First woman to fly a twin-engine aircraft around the world; First woman to fly the Pacific Ocean from west to east in a twin-engine plane; First woman to receive an airline transport rating at the age of 23; Youngest woman to complete a solo flight around the world.
1973	Rosella Bjornson	First female pilot for a commercial airline in North America
1976	Emily Howell Warner	First woman to become an American airline captain.
1978	Judy Cameron	First female pilot hired to fly for a major Canadian carrier (Air Canada).
1984	Svetlana Savitskaya	First woman to space walk.
1991	Sony Rana	Nepal's first licensed female commercial airline pilot.
February 1995	Eileen Collins	First female Space Shuttle commander.
2004	Irene Koki Mutungi	First African woman to qualify to captain a commercial aircraft; she qualified to command the Boeing 737.
2005	Hanadi Zakaria al-Hindi	First Saudi woman to become a commercial airline pilot.
September 18, 2006	Anousheh Ansari	First female space tourist.
2009	Patricia Mawuli Nyekodzi	Ghana's first female civilian pilot, and the first woman in West Africa certified to build and maintain Rotax engines.
2014	Nicola Scaife	Winner of the first women's hot air balloon world championship, which was held in Poland.
2015	Dalia	Iraq's first female commercial airline pilot.
2015	Ouma Laouali	Niger's first female pilot.
2023	Vanessa Hudson	First woman to lead Qantas Airways.
2024	Mitsuko Tottori	First woman to lead Japan Airlines, where she began her career as a flight attendant in 1985.
2025	Nguyễn Ly Huơng	First woman to become a Vietnamese airline captain.

== Education ==
Year	Name	Milestone
c. 1239	Bettisia Gozzadini	First woman to teach at a university (lectured in law at the University of Bologna)
1384	Katherine, Lady Berkeley	Founded Katharine Lady Berkeley's School, the first founded by a layperson, the first founded by a woman, and the first to offer free education to anyone.
1608	Juliana Morell	First woman to earn a doctorate degree.
1678	Elena Cornaro Piscopia	First woman to earn a Philosophy doctorate degree.
1732	Laura Bassi	First woman to officially teach at a European university.
1874	Grace Annie Lockhart	First woman in the British Empire to receive a Bachelor's degree
1875	Stefania Wolicka-Arnd	First woman to receive a PhD in the modern era.
1891	Juana Miranda	Ecuador's first female university professor.
1912	Anna Jane McKeag	First woman president of Wilson College
1935	Kate Galt Zaneis	First woman president of a public college or university (Southeastern Normal College now Southeastern Oklahoma State)

== General business ==
- 1500s: Philippine Welser, first European female billionaire.
- 1889: Anna Bissell, first female CEO in the United States of America.
- 1903: Maggie L. Walker, first African-American woman to charter a bank.
- 1908: Clara Hammerl, first woman to lead a Spanish financial institution.
- 1915: Helena Rubinstein, first woman to found a cosmetics company.
- 1945: Ruth Handler, first female president of a major toy company.
- 1961: Katherine Graham, first female to lead a Fortune 500 company.
- 1992: Alice Walton, first female decabillionaire.
- 1999: Andrea Jung, first female CEO of a MLM company.
- 1999: Carly Fiorina, first female head of a Fortune 20 company.
- 2000: Martha Stewart, first self-made female American billionaire.
- 2003: Oprah Winfrey, first female African-American billionaire.
- 2013: Mary Barra, first female CEO of a major car manufacturer.
- 2019: Kylie Jenner, first female billionaire under 30.
- 2020: Rania Llewellyn, first female bank CEO in Canada.
- 2021: Kathryn Farmer, first female CEO of a major railroad.

== Healthcare ==
- 1849: Elizabeth Blackwell becomes the first woman to earn a Medical Degree in the United States.
- 1863: Mary Edwards Walker becomes the first woman to practice surgery in the US Army
- 1867: Emily Jennings Stowe becomes the first woman to practice medicine in Canada
- 1901: Gertrude Stanton becomes the first woman licensed to practice optometry in the U.S.

== History ==
- 1st century AD: Ban Zhao and Pamphile of Epidaurus – first female historians in Han China and the Roman Empire respectively.
- 1083: Anna Comnena - the first woman known to personally record historical events as a historian.
- 1928: María del Pilar Fernández Vega – first female museum curator in Spain, National Archaeological Museum (Madrid).

== International bodies ==
- 1950: Geronima Pecson – first Filipino and first woman elected to the executive board of the United Nations Educational, Scientific and Cultural Organization (UNESCO).
- 1958: Agda Rössel – first woman Permanent Representative to the United Nations, as the representative of Sweden. She also becomes the first divorced woman Permanent Representative, in an era where many foreign ministries applied marriage bar rules requiring women to resign upon marriage.
- 1981: Jeane Kirkpatrick – First woman to serve as US Ambassador to the United Nations.
- 2021: Ngozi Okonjo-Iweala became the first female Director-General of the World Trade Organization.

== Journalism ==
- 1918: Minna Lewinson – first woman to win a Pulitzer Prize for journalism in any category.
- 1936: Anne O'Hare McCormick – first woman appointed to the editorial board of the Times.
- 1946: Katharine Graham – first female publisher of a major newspaper in the United States, The Washington Post.
- 1962: Ellene Mocria – first female radio newscaster and producer in Ethiopia.
- 1973: Linda Carter Brinson – first female assistant national editor at The Baltimore Sun.
- 2002: Linda Carter Brinson – first female editorial page editor at the Winston-Salem Journal.
- 2004: Catherine Pepinster – first woman to be editor of British newspaper The Tablet in its 175-year history.

== Literature ==
- c. 2300 BC: Enheduanna, earliest known poet and writer recorded in history.
- 935: Hrotsvitha of Gandersheim, the first female playwright.
- 1021: Murasaki Shikibu, author of The Tale of Genji, history's first novel coincidentally written by a woman.
- 1640: Aphra Behn, the first English women to earn a living by writing.
- 1648: Sor Juana Inés de la Cruz, the first published feminist of the New World.
- 1670: Juliana of Norwich, author of Revelations of Divine Love, the first known book written in the English language by a woman
- 1753: Phillis Wheatley, the first African American woman to publish a book.
- 1759: Mary Wollstonecraft, the first woman to openly write about feminist issues in A Vindication of the Rights of Woman.
- 1939: Agatha Christie, the first female author to publish a work (And Then There Were None) that sold more than 100 million copies.

== Nobel Prizes ==
- 1903: Marie Sklodowska-Curie, first woman to win the Nobel Prize in Physics; she shared the prize with Antoine Henri Becquerel and Pierre Curie. First woman to win a Nobel Prize.
- 1905: Baroness Bertha Sophie Felicita von Suttner, first woman to win the Nobel Peace Prize.
- 1909: Selma Lagerlöf, first woman to win the Nobel Prize in Literature.
- 1911: Marie Sklodowska-Curie, first woman to win the Nobel Prize in Chemistry. First person (and only woman to date) to win two Nobel Prizes. Only person to win a Nobel Prize in two different sciences.
- 1947: Gerty Cori, first woman to win the Nobel Prize in Physiology or Medicine; she shared the prize with Carl Ferdinand Cori and Bernardo Alberto Houssay. Although born in Prague, Gerty Cori is considered the first American woman to win a Nobel Prize in medicine. She had become a U.S. citizen in 1928.
- 1983: Barbara McClintock, first woman to win an unshared Nobel Prize in Physiology or Medicine.
- 2009: Elinor Ostrom, first woman to win the Nobel Prize in Economics, and the first American woman to do so; she shared the prize with Oliver E. Williamson.

== Politics ==
Historic firsts for women as heads of state or government:

- Yevgenia Bosch, Ukrainian People's Republic (1917–1918), sometimes considered the first modern female leader of a national government. She held the position of Minister of Interior and Acting Leader of the People's Secretariat of Ukraine, one of a number of competing ruling bodies in the Ukrainian People's Republic, the predecessor of Soviet Ukraine.
- Khertek Anchimaa-Toka, Tuvan People's Republic (1940–1944): The first female head of state (Chairperson of the Presidium of the Little Khural) of a partially recognized country.
- Sukhbaataryn Yanjmaa, Mongolia (1953–1954): The first female acting head of state (Chairperson of the Presidium of the State Great Khural).
- Sirimavo Bandaranaike, Ceylon, now Sri Lanka (1960–1965): The first elected female prime minister (head of government) of a sovereign country. She served again 1970–77 and 1994–2000; in total she served for 17 years.
- Indira Gandhi, India (1966–1977): The first female prime minister of a present-day G20 country. She served again 1980–1984.
- Soong Ching-ling, China (1968–1972): The first female acting co-head of state (Co-chairperson). She later served as Honorary President for 12 days in 1981.
- Golda Meir, Israel (1969–1974): The first female prime minister in the Middle East.
- Isabel Perón, Argentina (1974–1976): The first (appointed) female president, head of state and head of government.
- Elisabeth Domitien, Central African Republic (1975–1976): The first (appointed) female prime minister of an African country.
- Margaret Thatcher, United Kingdom (1979–1990): The first female prime minister of a G7/P5 country and the first female prime minister of a sovereign European country.
- Eugenia Charles, Dominica (1980–1995): The longest continuously serving female prime minister. (Note: Third longest when considering non-consecutive terms, after Indira Gandhi of India and the Sri Lankan leader, Sirimavo Bandaranaike.)
- Vigdís Finnbogadóttir, Iceland (1980–1996): The first democratically directly elected female president. With a presidency of exactly sixteen years, she also remains the longest-serving elected female head of state of any country to date.
- Jeanne Sauvé, Canada (1984–1990): The first female head of state in North America.
- Corazon Aquino, Philippines (1986–1992): The first female president in Southeast Asia.
- Nguyễn Thị Định, Việt Nam (1987–1992): The first female Vice President of Việt Nam.
- Benazir Bhutto, Pakistan (1988–1990): The first female prime minister of any Muslim majority country. She served again 1993–96.
- Kim Campbell, Canada (1993): The first female head of government in North America.
- Tansu Çiller, Turkey (1993–1996): The first elected Muslim female prime minister in Europe.
- Chandrika Kumaratunga, Sri Lanka (1994–2000): The first time that a nation possessed a female president (Chandrika Kumaratunga) and a female prime minister (Sirimavo Bandaranaike) simultaneously. This also marked the first time that a female prime minister (Sirimavo Bandaranaike) directly succeeded another female prime minister (Chandrika Kumaratunga).
- Ruth Perry, Liberia (1996–1997): The first (appointed) female head of state in Africa. Carmen Pereira of Guinea-Bissau and Sylvie Kinigi of Burundi had previously acted as head of state for 2 days and 101 days respectively.
- Mary McAleese, Ireland (1997–2011): The first time that a female president directly succeeded another female president, Mary Robinson.
- Ellen Johnson Sirleaf, Liberia (2006–2018): Africa's first elected female head of state.
- Jóhanna Sigurðardóttir, Iceland (2009–2013): As prime minister, she was the world's first openly lesbian world leader, first female world leader to wed a same-sex partner while in office.
- Elizabeth II, United Kingdom (1952–2022): In 2015, she became the longest-reigning queen regnant and female head of state in world history. In 2016, she became the longest currently serving head of state and longest currently reigning monarch.
- Ursula von der Leyen, European Union (2019–present): The first woman to be appointed President of the European Commission.
- Kamala Harris, United States (2021–2025): The first woman to be inaugurated as Vice President of the United States in American history.
- Sandra Mason, Barbados (2021–present): The first time that a country's first president was female (Barbados has not had a male president to date).
- Giorgia Meloni, Italy (2022–present): The first woman to be elected in Italy as head of government.
- Sarah Huckabee Sanders, Arkansas (2023–present): The first woman to serve as governor of Arkansas.
- Leslie Rutledge, Arkansas (2023–present): The first woman to serve as lieutenant governor of Arkansas.
- Claudia Sheinbaum, Mexico (2024–present): The first woman to be elected president of Mexico.
- Sanae Takaichi, Japan (2025–present): became the first female prime minister of Japan and the first female president of the LDP in October 2025.

== Racing ==
- 1949: Sara Christian became the first woman to race in NASCAR.
- 1976: Janet Guthrie became the first woman to qualify and compete in the Indianapolis 500
- 1977: Janet Guthrie became the first woman to qualify and compete in the Daytona 500
- 1989: Shawna Robinson became the first woman to win a NASCAR-sanctioned stock car race, winning in the Charlotte/Daytona Dash Series at New Asheville Speedway.
- 2005: Danica Patrick became the first woman to lead the Indianapolis 500
- 2008: Danica Patrick became the first woman to win an Indy Car Series race.
- 2013: Danica Patrick became the first woman to race a complete full-time NASCAR Monster Energy Cup Series schedule.
- 2013: Danica Patrick became the first woman to win a pole position for NASCAR Monster Energy Cup Series in the 2013 Daytona 500.
- 2013: Danica Patrick became the first woman to lead the Daytona 500.
- 2026: Lia Block became the first woman to win an American Rally Association (ARA) Championship Round

== Religion ==
For articles on women in religion in the pre-modern era see: List of early Christian women presbyters, List of Christian women of the early church, Medieval women's Christian mysticism, Women in ancient Rome/Religious life

Women firsts in religion in the modern era.

- 1821: Mary Cover Lawry, Wesleyan, first Australian-born woman missionary sent from Australia.
- 1836-1838: Harriet Pullen, Wesleyan Methodist, first European woman attested to as preaching in colonial Australia. Pullen preached a few sermons to a small Methodist congregation in Brown’s River, Tasmania, in the absence of her missionary husband.
- 1842: Anne Drysdale, Presbyterian, Victoria, Australia, first woman householder known to lead prayer services and read sermons to her male employees.
- 1855: February, Ann Roberts, Bible Christian, first European woman reported to have regularly preached to a mixed-sex congregation in colonial Australia with the approval of her denomination (in Adelaide, South Australia, including on the Fortitude, the ship she arrived on).
- 1882: October, Ellen Arnold, Baptist, first missionary sent from Australia by the South Australian Baptist Missionary Society, worked in Furreedpore, India. Note: The first ten missionaries sent by Australian Baptists were women.
- 1892: Helen Plummer Phillips, Anglican, first missionary sent from Australia by the Church Missionary Association NSW.
- 1928: Maude Royden, Congregationalist and Anglican, first woman to preach in an Anglican church and Anglican Cathedral in Australia.
- 1935: Regina Jonas first woman to be ordained as a rabbi.
- 1974: Marlene (Polly) Thalheimer, first woman ordained as minister in the Presbyterian Church of Australia.
- 1974: July, Alison Cheek, Anglican, first Australian woman ordained as an Episcopalian (Anglican) priest, in Philadelphia, US, one of the Philadelphia Eleven.
- 1978: October, Marita Munro first woman ordained as a minister in the Baptist Union of Australia.
- 1980: Marjorie Matthews, first woman to become a bishop of the United Methodist Church.
- 1989: Barbara Harris, first woman ordained a bishop in the Anglican Communion (first woman suffragan bishop).
- 1990: Penny Jamieson, the Anglican Communion's first woman diocesan bishop, consecrated as Bishop of the Diocese of Dunedin, New Zealand.
- 1991: 14 September, Liyapidiny Marika of Yirrkala, Northern Territory, first Aborginal woman ordained to the ministry of the Uniting Church in Australia.
- 1992: January, Colleen 'Dawn' Kenyon, licensed to officiate and installed as the first woman rector in the Anglican Church of Australia, for the parish of Southern Cross-Westonia, Western Australia (ordained as priest in Auckland, New Zealand in 1987).
- 1992: March, Elizabeth (Betty) Arney, first woman ordained priest in the Anglican Church of Australia, Perth, (first of all the other First women ordained as priests in the Anglican Church of Australia).
- 1994: 12 March, the first women were ordained as Church of England priests; 32 women were ordained together.
- 1996: 21 December, Gloria Shipp, first Aboriginal woman ordained as priest in the Anglican Church of Australia.
- 2000: Denise Wyss, first woman to be ordained as a priest in the Old Catholic Church.
- 2003: Alison Elliot was elected the first female moderator of the General Assembly of the Church of Scotland. She chaired the General Assembly the following year.
- 2006: Katharine Jefferts Schori, first female presiding bishop of the Episcopal Church in the United States.
- 2008: Kay Goldsworthy, first woman consecrated bishop in the Anglican Church of Australia, becoming a suffragan bishop in Perth.
- 2014: Libby Lane, first female consecrated bishop in the Church of England.
- 2014: March, Sarah Mcneil, first woman appointed as a diocesan bishop in the Anglican Church of Australia, Grafton, NSW.
- 2018: Kay Goldsworthy, first woman archbishop in the Anglican Church of Australia, of the Anglican Diocese of Perth and Metropolitan of Western Australia.
- 2021: Sister Nathalie Becquart, first woman appointed as undersecretary to the Synod of Bishops.
- 2022: Judith Levitan, Jewish rabbanit, first Jewish woman chaplain appointed to the Australian Defence Force.
- 2023: Maria Kubin, first female consecrated bishop in the Old Catholic Church in Austria.
- 2025: Sarah Mullally named the 106th Archbishop of Canterbury, the first woman to become the spiritual leader of the Church of England.
- 2025: Katrina Foster, first woman bishop of the Metropolitan New York Synod of the Evangelical Lutheran Church in America
- 2025: April, Maria Rudolph and Sue Westhorp, first two women ordained as pastors in the Lutheran Church of Australia and New Zealand.
- 2025: Kamala Sharma-Wing, first full-time Hindu chaplain to the Australian Defence Force (Navy).

== Sports ==
- August 6, 1926: Gertrude Ederle, first woman to swim across the English Channel.
- 1937: Grace Hudowalski was the ninth person and first woman to climb all 46 of the Adirondack High Peaks.
- 1940s: Lois Fegan Farrell became the first female reporter to cover a professional hockey team in America.
- 1960: Mary McGee becomes the first official female motorcycle racer in the United States by earning a license from the Federation Internationale de Motocyclisme. She is also the first person to compete in the Baja 500 off-road race alone.
- 1960: Wilma Rudolph, track and field champion, became the first American woman to win three gold medals in the Rome Olympics. She elevated women's track to a major presence in the United States. As a member of the black community, she is also regarded as a civil rights and women's rights pioneer. Along with other 1960 Olympic athletes such as Cassius Clay (who later became Muhammad Ali), Rudolph became an international star due to the first international television coverage of the Olympics that year.
- 1967: Drahşan Arda (born 1945) is a Turkish former association football referee. She was confirmed as the world's first female football referee by FIFA cockart.
- July 1967 Michiko Imai and Yoshiko Wakayama made the first all female ascent of the Matterhorn's north face.
- November 27, 1968: Penny Ann Early, first woman to play major professional basketball, in an ABA game (Kentucky Colonels vs. Los Angeles Stars).
- 1969 The Japanese mountaineer Michiko Imai makes the first ascent of the Japanese Direct route, on the North face of the Eiger, the only female in a team of six.
- August 15, 1970: Patricia Palinkas, first woman to play professionally in an American football game.
- January 1, 1972 – Women were officially welcomed into the United States Polo Association with Sue Sally Hale becoming the first female member.
- May 16, 1975: Junko Tabei, first woman to reach the summit of Mount Everest.
- 1993: Lynn Hill does the first free ascent (FFA) of the 3,000-foot Nose Route on El Capitan (5.14a/b); one of the biggest prizes in big wall climbing.
- 1993: Halli Reid became the first woman to swim across Lake Erie, swimming from Long Point, Ontario, to North East, Pennsylvania, in 17 hours.
- 1994: Catherine Destivelle becomes the first woman to complete the winter free solo of the "north face trilogy" of the Eiger, the Grandes Jorasses, and the Matterhorn.
- October 18, 1997: Liz Heaston, first female to play and score in a college football game, kicking two extra points in the 1997 Linfield vs. Willamette football game.
- December 26, 2008: Sarah Thomas, first woman to officiate an NCAA football bowl game.
- 2009: Kei Taniguchi becomes the first woman to win the Piolet d'Or (Golden Ice Axe), the "Oscar" of Mountaineering.
- September 4, 2009: Carolynn Sells became the first woman to win a solo motorcycle race on the Snaefell Mountain Course in the Isle of Man when she won the Ultra Lightweight race at the 2009 Manx Grand Prix.
- May 17, 2010, Edurne Pasaban became the first woman to climb all of the fourteen eight-thousander peaks in the World.
- May 4, 2012: Rosie Napravnik became the first woman jockey to win the Kentucky Oaks, riding Believe You Can.
- August 9, 2012: Shannon Eastin becomes the first woman to officiate a National Football League game in a pre-season matchup between the Green Bay Packers and the San Diego Chargers.
- 2012: Anna Wardley, from England, became the first person to complete a solo swim around Portsea Island recognized by the British Long Distance Swimming Association.
- May 31, 2013: Lydia Nsekera became the first female FIFA Executive Committee member.
- May 18, 2013: Rosie Napravnik places third in the Preakness Stakes on Mylute, making her the first woman to have ridden in all three Triple Crown races. On June 8, 2013, she rode the filly Unlimited Budget to a 6th-place finish in the 2013 Belmont, becoming the first woman to ride all three Triple Crown races in the same year.
- June 2013: Ashley Freiberg became the first woman to claim an overall GT3 Cup Challenge victory in North America, winning the Porsche IMSA GT3 Cup Challenge.
- September 23, 2013: Sarah Outen arrived in a small harbor on the Aleutian island of Adak, and thus became the first person to row solo from Japan to Alaska, as well as the first woman to complete a mid-Pacific row from West to East.
- 2013: Davie Jane Gilmour became the first woman to lead the board of directors for Little League.
- 2013: UFC 157, which took place in February, featured not only the first women's fight in UFC history but also the first UFC event to be headlined by two female fighters (Ronda Rousey and Liz Carmouche).
- 2013: On her fifth attempt and at the age of 64, Diana Nyad became the first person confirmed to swim from Cuba to Florida without the protection of a shark cage, swimming from Havana to Key West.
- 2013: Scotland's solicitor general, Lesley Thomson, became the first woman to be appointed to Scottish Rugby's board.
- 2013: Anna Wardley, from England, became the first woman to swim non-stop around the Isle of Wight.
- 2013: Peggy O'Neal, an American-born lawyer, became the first woman in the Australian Football League to hold the position of club president, being chosen as the president of the Richmond Football Club.
- 2013: Tracey Gaudry became the first woman appointed as vice president of the Union Cycliste Internationale.
- 2013: Adel Weir, former world number 53 from South Africa, became the first ever female squash coach hire at the Qatar Squash Federation.
- 2013: Maria Toor, a squash player from South Waziristan, became the winner of the first ever women's event in the Nash Cup in Canada by beating Milou van der Heijden of the Netherlands 13–11, 11–3, 11–9.
- 2013: Tatyana McFadden became the first athlete to win six gold medals at a championships during the 2013 IPC Athletics World Championships in Lyon. She claimed gold in every event from the 100 meters through to the 5,000 meters.
- 2013: Tatyana McFadden won the Boston, Chicago, London, and New York marathons in 2013. This makes her the first person – able-bodied or otherwise – to win the four major marathons in the same year. She also set a new course record for the Chicago Marathon (1 hour, 42 minutes, 35 seconds).
- 2013: Denise Fejtek became the first woman to complete the "Peak to Heat Double" – the combination of summiting Mount Everest and finishing the Ironman Triathlon World Championship in Kona, Hawaii. She reached the Everest Summit on May 23, 2010, and finished the Hawaii Ironman in October 2013.
- 2013: Sonya Baumstein became the first person to stand-up paddleboard across the Bering Strait.
- 2013: Meredith Novack became the fastest person, and first woman, to pull a double crossing of the Auau Channel in Hawaii. Her time was 11 hours and one minute.
- 2013: Rosie Napravnik won 17 races to become the first woman to capture the leading rider title at Keeneland.
- 2013: Olivia Prokopova became the first woman to win the World Crazy Golf Championship.
- 2013: Mia Hamm became the first woman inducted into the World Football Hall of Fame in Pachuca, Mexico.
- 2013: Emily Bell became the first woman to kayak the length of Britain.
- 2013: Casey Stoney became the first female member of the Professional Footballers' Association's management committee.
- 2013: Jodi Eller became the first woman to complete the 1,515-mile Florida Circumnavigational Saltwater Paddling Trail.
- 2013: On March 1, 2013, Privateers owner and president Nicole Kirnan served as the team's coach for the first time, making her the first woman to coach a professional hockey team in the United States.
- 2014: Torah Bright became the first woman to qualify for three snowboard disciplines at a Winter Olympics, specifically snowboard cross, halfpipe and slopestyle.
- 2014: Ashley Freiberg became the first woman to win an overall race in Continental Tire Challenge History when she won the Continental Tire SportsCar Challenge. Her co-driver was Shelby Blackstock.
- 2014: The first women competed in ski jumping at the Olympics.
- 2014: Jennifer Welter became the first female non-kicker or placekick-holder to play in a men's pro football game; she played running back for the Texas Revolution.
- 2014: Abbey Holmes became the first woman to kick 100 goals in one regular season of Australian Rules football.
- 2014: Annabel Anderson, from New Zealand, became the first woman to cross Cook Strait standing on a paddleboard.
- 2014: Peta Searle became the first woman appointed as a development coach in the Australian Football League when she was chosen by St Kilda as a development coach.
- 2014: 16-year-old Katie Ormerod, from Britain, became the first female snowboarder to land a backside double cork 1080.
- 2014: Shelby Osborne became the first female defensive back in American football when she was drafted by Campbellsville University in Kentucky.
- 2014: Amélie Mauresmo became the first woman to coach a top male tennis player (specifically, Andy Murray).
- 2014: Corinne Diacre became the first woman to coach a men's professional soccer team (Clermont Foot) in a competitive match in France on August 4, 2014, her 40th birthday.
- 2014: Cecilia Brækhus, from Norway, became the first Norwegian and the first woman to hold all major world championship titles in her weight division (welterweight) in boxing.
- 2014: On August 15, 2014, Mo'ne Davis was the first girl in Little League World Series history to pitch a winning game for the Taney Dragons and earned the win, and she was also the first girl to pitch a shutout in Little League postseason history.
- 2014: Amy Hughes, from England, ran 53 marathons in 53 days, thus setting the record for the most marathons run on consecutive days by any person, male or female.
- 2015: Jennifer Welter became the first woman hired to coach in men's pro football when the Texas Revolution of the Champions Indoor Football league announced that Welter was hired to coach linebackers and special teams.
- 2019: G. S. Lakshmi, former Indian cricketer, becomes the first female ICC match referee
- 2021: First African-American female full-time NFL coach (Washington Football Team); Jennifer King.

== See also ==
(History Portal is a "main page" linking to broader history topics.)

- Aerial Nurse Corps of America - composed entirely of women pilots, ANCOA is regarded as the beginning of flight nurses and Air Ambulances.
- Early Australian female aviators
- List of American women's firsts - women's firsts specific to the U.S.
- List of inventions and discoveries by women - inventions and discoveries in which women played a primary role
- Timeline of women in photography - includes historic firsts for women in photography (as an art and in journalism)
- Women in India §Timeline of women's achievements in India - section includes historic firsts for women in India
- Women's history – Study of women's role in history
- First woman (disambiguation link?)
