= Goloe Pass =

Mountain pass in Antarctica

Location of Sentinel Range in Western Antarctica.

Map of Sentinel Range.

Goloe Pass (Bulgarian: проход Голое, ‘Prohod Goloe’ \'pro-hod go-'lo-e\) is the ice-covered saddle of elevation 2468 m between Enitsa Peak and Bruguière Peak on the side ridge that trends 9.15 km northeastwards from Mount Giovinetto on the main crest of north-central Sentinel Range in Ellsworth Mountains, Antarctica. It is part of the glacial divide between Rumyana Glacier to the southeast and Delyo Glacier to the northwest.

The pass is named after the ancient and medieval fortress of Goloe in Southeastern Bulgaria.

== Location ==
Goloe Pass is located at 78°15′42″S 85°52′48″W, which is 5.67 km northeast of Mount Giovinetto, 3.7 km west of Debren Pass and 4.12 km north-northwest of Progled Saddle. US mapping in 1961 and 1988.

== Maps ==
- Vinson Massif. Scale 1:250 000 topographic map. Reston, Virginia: US Geological Survey, 1988.
- Antarctic Digital Database (ADD). Scale 1:250000 topographic map of Antarctica. Scientific Committee on Antarctic Research (SCAR). Since 1993, regularly updated.
