= Progled Saddle =

Location of Sentinel Range in Western Antarctica.

Map of Sentinel Range.

Progled Saddle (Bulgarian: седловина Проглед, ‘Sedlovina Progled’ \se-dlo-vi-'na 'pro-gled\) is the saddle of elevation 2517 m in Ellsworth Mountains, Antarctica connecting Evans Peak to Versinikia Peak on the side ridge that trends 8.8 km from the south rib of Mount Giovinetto on the main crest of north-central Sentinel Range northeastwards to Debren Pass. It is part of the glacial divide between Patton Glacier to the southeast and the head of Rumyana Glacier to the northwest.

The saddle is named after the settlement of Progled in Southern Bulgaria.

== Location ==
Progled Saddle is located at 78°17′48″S 85°49′22″W, which is 6.08 km east by south of Mount Giovinetto, 4.12 km south-southeast of Goloe Pass, 4.17 km southwest of Debren Pass and 8.2 km north-northwest of Podgore Saddle. US mapping in 1961 and 1988.

== Maps ==
- Vinson Massif. Scale 1:250 000 topographic map. Reston, Virginia: US Geological Survey, 1988.
- Antarctic Digital Database (ADD). Scale 1:250000 topographic map of Antarctica. Scientific Committee on Antarctic Research (SCAR). Since 1993, regularly updated.
