= Enitsa Peak =

Mountain in Antarctica

Location of Sentinel Range in Western Antarctica.

Map of Sentinel Range.

Enitsa Peak (Bulgarian: връх Еница, romanized: vrah Enitsa, IPA: [ˈvrɤx ɛˈnit͡sɐ]) is the sharp rocky peak rising to 2,816 metres (9,239 ft) on the side ridge that trends 9.15 kilometres (5.69 mi) northeastwards from Mount Giovinetto on the main crest of north-central Sentinel Range in Ellsworth Mountains, Antarctica. It surmounts Rumyana Glacier to the southeast and Delyo Glacier to the northwest.

The peak is named after the settlement of Enitsa in Northern Bulgaria.

== Location ==
Enitsa Peak is located at 78°15′47″S 85°54′41″W, which is 5 kilometres (3.1 mi) northeast of Mount Giovinetto, 5.6 km (3.5 mi) east of Mount Viets, 77.9 km (4.9 mi) west of Mount Jumper, 4.23 km (2.63 mi) northwest of Versinikia Peak and 4.85 km (3.01 mi) north of Evans Peak. US mapping in 1961 and 1988.

== See also ==
- Mountains in Antarctica

== Maps ==
- Vinson Massif. Scale 1:250,000 topographic map. Reston, Virginia: US Geological Survey, 1988.
- Antarctic Digital Database (ADD). Scale 1:250,000 topographic map of Antarctica. Scientific Committee on Antarctic Research (SCAR). Since 1993, regularly updated.
