= Bruguière Peak =

Mountain in Antarctica

Location of Sentinel Range in Western Antarctica.

Map of Sentinel Range.

Bruguière Peak (Bulgarian: връх Брюгиер, romanized: vrah Bruguière, IPA: [ˈvrɤɣ brʲoɡiˈɛr]) is the sharp rocky peak rising to 2,722 m (8,930 ft) near the end of the side ridge that trends 9.15 km (5.69 mi) northeastwards from Mount Giovinetto on the main crest of north-central Sentinel Range in Ellsworth Mountains, Antarctica. It surmounts Rumyana Glacier to the southeast and Delyo Glacier to the northwest.

The peak is named after the French zoologist Jean Guillaume Bruguière (1750-1798) who sailed with Yves-Joseph de Kerguelen-Trémarec to Kerguelen Islands in 1772, becoming the first scientist after Edmund Halley to visit the Antarctic region.

== Location ==
Bruguière Peak is located at 78°15′17″S 85°51′45″W, which is 6.44 km (4.0 mi) northeast of Mount Giovinetto, 1.45 km (0.9 mi) northeast of Enitsa Peak, 6.83 km (4.2 mi) west of Mount Jumper, 4.58 km (2.8 mi) north-northwest of Versinikia Peak and 5.95 km (3.7 mi) north by east of Evans Peak. US mapping in 1961 and 1988.

== See also ==
- Mountains in Antarctica

== Maps ==
- Vinson Massif. Scale 1:250 000 topographic map. Reston, Virginia: US Geological Survey, 1988.
- Antarctic Digital Database (ADD). Scale 1:250000 topographic map of Antarctica. Scientific Committee on Antarctic Research (SCAR). Since 1993, regularly updated.
