= Versinikia Peak =

Peak in Ellsworth Mountains, Antarctica

Location of Sentinel Range in Western Antarctica.

Map of Sentinel Range.

Versinikia Peak (Bulgarian: връх Версиникия, romanized: vrah Versinikiya, IPA: [ˈvrɤɣ vɛrsiˈnikijɐ]) is the sharp peak in Ellsworth Mountains, Antarctica rising to 2918 m on the side ridge that trends 8.8 km from the south rib of Mount Giovinetto on the main crest of north-central Sentinel Range northeastwards via Evans Peak to Debren Pass. It has partly ice-free west and southeast slopes, and surmounts Patton Glacier to the southeast and the head of Rumyana Glacier to the northwest.

The peak is named after the medieval fortress of Versinikia in Southeastern Bulgaria.

== Location ==
Versinikia Peak is located at 78°17′38″S 85°48′11″W, which is 3.1 km northeast of Evans Peak, 6.5 km east of Mount Giovinetto, 6.6 km southwest of Mount Jumper and 8.53 km northwest of Mount Bearskin. US mapping in 1961 and 1988.

== Maps ==
- Vinson Massif. Scale 1:250 000 topographic map. Reston, Virginia: US Geological Survey, 1988.
- Antarctic Digital Database (ADD). Scale 1:250000 topographic map of Antarctica. Scientific Committee on Antarctic Research (SCAR). Since 1993, regularly updated.
