= Burdenis Glacier =

Glacier in Antarctica

- Location of Sentinel Range in Western Antarctica

- Location within Antarctica
- Location: Ellsworth Land
- Coordinates: 78°14′S 86°03′W
- Length: 3 nmi (6 km; 3 mi)
- Width: 1 nmi (2 km; 1 mi)
- Thickness: unknown
- Terminus: Sentinel Range
- Status: unknown

Map of Sentinel Range.

Burdenis Glacier (Bulgarian: ледник Бурденис, romanized: lednik Burdenis, IPA: [ˈlɛdniɡ borˈdɛnis]) is the 6 km long and 1.7 km wide glacier on the east side of the main crest of north-central Sentinel Range in Ellsworth Mountains, Antarctica. It is situated north of Delyo Glacier and south of Gerila Glacier. The glacier drains the north slopes of Mount Viets and the southeast slopes of the southern summit of Long Gables Peak, flows northeastwards and together with Delyo Glacier and Gerila Glacier joins upper Ellen Glacier north of Bruguière Peak.

The glacier is named after the ancient Roman settlement of Burdenis in Southern Bulgaria.

== Location ==
Burdenis Glacier is centred at 78°14′00″S 86°03′00″W. US mapping in 1961 and 1988.

== See also ==
- List of glaciers in the Antarctic
- Glaciology

== Maps ==
- Vinson Massif. Scale 1:250 000 topographic map. Reston, Virginia: US Geological Survey, 1988.
- Antarctic Digital Database (ADD). Scale 1:250000 topographic map of Antarctica. Scientific Committee on Antarctic Research (SCAR). Since 1993, regularly upgraded and updated.
