= Laouali =

Laouali is a Nigerien surname. Notable people with the surname include:

- Idrissa Laouali (born 1979), Nigerien footballer
- Ouma Laouali (fl. 2015), Nigerien pilot, first woman pilot in Niger
