= Gerila Glacier =

Glacier in Antarctica

- Location of Sentinel Range in Western Antarctica

- Location within Antarctica
- Location: Ellsworth Land
- Coordinates: 78°12′25″S 86°02′00″W
- Length: 4 nautical miles (7.4 km; 4.6 mi)
- Width: 1 nautical mile (1.9 km; 1.2 mi)
- Thickness: unknown
- Terminus: Ellen Glacier
- Status: unknown

Map of Sentinel Range.

Gerila Glacier (Bulgarian: ледник Герила, romanized: lednik Gerila, IPA: [ˈlɛdniɡ ɡɛˈriɫɐ]) is 4 nautical miles (7.4 km; 4.6 mi) long and 1 nautical mile (1.9 km; 1.2 mi) wide glacier on the east side of the main crest of north-central Sentinel Range in Ellsworth Mountains, Antarctica. It is situated north of Burdenis Glacier and south of Fonfon Glacier. The glacier drains the saddle of the twin peak of Long Gables, flows northeastwards and together with Delyo Glacier and Burdenis Glacier joins upper Ellen Glacier north of Bruguière Peak.

The glacier is named after Gerila River in Northeastern Bulgaria.

== Location ==
Gerila Glacier is centred at 78°12′25″S 86°02′00″W. US mapping in 1961 and 1988.

== See also ==
- List of glaciers in the Antarctic
- Glaciology

== Maps ==
- Vinson Massif. Scale 1:250 000 topographic map. Reston, Virginia: US Geological Survey, 1988.
- Antarctic Digital Database (ADD). Scale 1:250000 topographic map of Antarctica. Scientific Committee on Antarctic Research (SCAR). Since 1993, regularly updated.
