= Mario Giovinetto =

Argentine-Canadian glaciologist (1933–2024)

Mario Giovinetto (1933 – 6 January 2024) was an Argentine glaciologist, climatologist and geographer. He was a Canadian citizen with permanent resident status in the United States.

== Career ==
Mario Giovinetto was born in La Plata, Buenos Aires Province, Argentina. was active in polar research beginning in 1952. He participated in projects supported by the National Science Foundation (US) and other federal research agencies in Argentina and Canada. His field work experience includes three expeditions to high-mountain glaciers in the Andes Mountains (South America) and in Africa (1952–1955), winter stays at two Antarctic stations (Byrd Station, 1957 and South Pole Station, 1958), and nine summer-seasons in Antarctica and Greenland (1953–1978). He has logged more than 2,000 miles of over-snow traverse, made observations at a number of sea-ice and iceberg sites, and spent approximately nine years as a member of small isolated teams working in demanding environments. His glaciology and climatology research was done while affiliated with the Instituto Antartico Argentino (Buenos Aires; 1953–1956), Arctic Institute of North America (New York; 1956–1959), Institute of Polar Studies (now Byrd Polar Research Center), Ohio State University (Columbus); 1959–1961, and the Geophysical and Polar Research Center, University of Wisconsin (Madison; 1961–1968).

His research led to estimates of mass and energy exchange between atmosphere, ocean (including sea ice) and ice sheets of both hemispheres that are used in global climate change model construction. His contributions have been recognized in several awards from US and Argentine government agencies.

Mount Giovinetto is a 4090 m/13,419 ft mountain named after him in the Antarctic Ellsworth Mountains Sentinel Range.

In 2001 Giovinetto participated in a NASA Johnson Space Center workshop, "Antarctic Explorations Parallels for Future Human Planetary Exploration", where the isolated polar environment experience of researchers was used to help predict issues that could arise in human crew extraplanetary exploration. There are many parallels between a winter-long remote polar settlement and one on the Moon or Mars.

== Education and affiliations ==
Mario Giovinetto's higher education began at the Universidad Nacional de La Plata and culminated in a Ph.D. (1968) in geography with a minor in geology and geophysics from the University of Wisconsin, Madison. He has held academic positions at the University of Wisconsin, the University of California - Berkeley, and the University of Calgary where he served as department head. He was principal scientist at the Department of Geodynamics, Raytheon Technical Services Company and has held the appointment of professor emeritus, University of Calgary.

== Publications ==
Giovinetto has written or co-authored numerous technical reports, examples are:

- Vaughan, David G.; Bamber, Jonathan L.; Giovinetto, Mario; Russell, Jonathan; Cooper, A. Paul R. (April 1999). "Reassessment of Net Surface Mass Balance in Antarctica". J. Climate. 12 (4): 933–946. Bibcode:1999JCli...12..933V. doi:10.1175/1520-0442(1999)012<0933:RONSMB>2.0.CO;2.
- Zwally, H. Jay; Giovinetto, Mario B.; Li, Jun; Cornejo, Helen G.; Beckley, Matthew A.; Brenner, Anita C.; Saba, Jack L.; Yi, Donghui (December 2005). "Mass changes of the Greenland and Antarctic ice sheets and shelves and contributions to sea-level rise: 1992–2002". Journal of Glaciology. 51 (175): 509–527. Bibcode:2005JGlac..51..509Z. doi:10.3189/172756505781829007. hdl:2060/20060024016.
- Glaciological Studies on the McMurdo-South Pole Traverse, 1960-1961 (Ohio State University, Institute of Polar Studies; no. 7; 1963)
- Giovinetto, M.B.; Yamazaki, K.; Wendler, G.; Bromwich, D.H. (27 May 1997). "Atmospheric net transport of water vapor and latent heat across 60°S". J. Geophys. Res. 102 (D10): 11171–9. Bibcode:1997JGR...10211171G. doi:10.1029/96JD03677.
- Giovinetto, M.B.; Waters, N.M.; Bentley, C.R. (20 March 1990). "Dependence of Antarctic surface mass balance on temperature, elevation, and distance to open ocean". J. Geophys. Res. Atmos. 95 (D4): 3517–31. Bibcode:1990JGR....95.3517G. doi:10.1029/JD095iD04p03517.
