= Hyacinthe Destivelle =

French Catholic priest (born 1970)

The Reverend Hyacinthe Destivelle
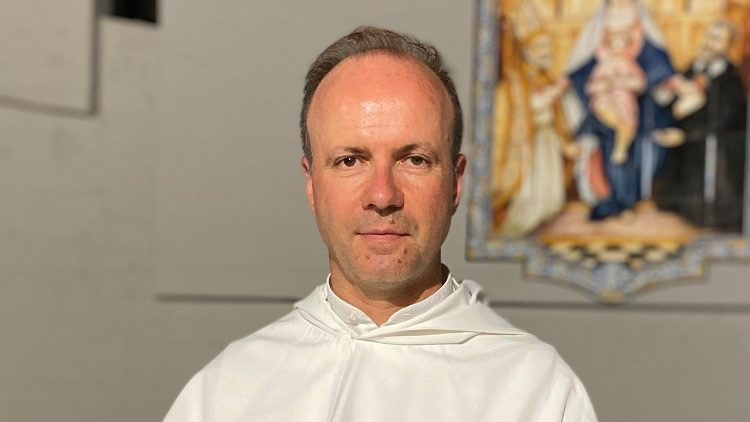
- Destivelle in 2025
- Church: Roman Catholic Church
- Archdiocese: Toulouse
- Previous posts: St. Catherine's Church, Saint Petersburg, Russia

Orders
- Ordination: June 23, 2001

Personal details
- Born: Laurent Jacques Hubert Destivelle; September 9, 1970 (age 56) Paris, France
- Residence: Santi Domenico e Sisto, Rome, Italy
- Education: Sciences Po; Sorbonne University; Catholic University of Paris; Saint Petersburg State University
- Military career
- Allegiance: France
- Branch: French Navy
- Service years: 1993–1994
- Unit: Aircraft carrier Foch

Hyacinthe Destivelle (born Laurent Jacques Hubert Destivelle, September 9, 1970) is a French Catholic Dominican priest and theologian specializing in Catholic ecumenism with Eastern Catholicism and the Eastern Orthodox Church. Since 2013, he has been an official of the Dicastery for Promoting Christian Unity and is regarded as among the Vatican's foremost specialists on relations with the Russian Orthodox Church. He was previously rector of the Church of St. Catherine basilica in Saint Petersburg, the oldest Catholic church in Russia, and a dean of the Archdiocese of Moscow. He is also the younger brother of rock climbing icon Catherine Destivelle.

== Early life and education ==
Laurent Jacques Hubert Destivelle was born September 9, 1970, the fifth of six children and the only son of French engineer Serge Destivelle and his wife Annie, a painting teacher. He has five sisters: Florence, Sophie, Martine, Claire, and Catherine, who is considered one of the greatest female rock climbers in history.

As a child, Destivelle was baptized by a priest of the Melkite Greek Catholic Church and had a Reformed Protestant godfather. He was a Boy Scout, and sang in the famous boys' church choir, the Little Singers of Paris. At age ten, he saw Pope John Paul II speak at Paris–Le Bourget Airport during the Pope's first visit to France in June 1980.

For undergraduate studies, Destivelle attended Sciences Po Bordeaux, graduating in 1992 with a degree in political science. From 1992 to 1993 he did graduate studies at Sciences Po in Paris.

The following year, he was conscripted into the French Navy, serving from 1993 to 1994 aboard the aircraft carrier Foch. Conscription in France ended in 1996.

Destivelle earned his doctorate through a joint program in Paris, earning a doctorate of philosophy in Slavic studies from Sorbonne University (Paris IV), a doctorate of theology from the Catholic University of Paris, and a doctorate in scientia sacra (sacred science) from the St. Sergius Orthodox Theological Institute. During his studies, he spent time at the Higher School of the Faculty of Philosophy at Saint Petersburg State University from 2003 to 2005. He defended his doctoral thesis, Reform of the Ecclesial Academies and the Teaching of Orthodox Theology in Russia at the Beginning of the 20th century, in Paris, on December 11, 2008. His doctoral advisors were historian Francis Conte from Sorbonne University, and theologian Laurent Villemin from the Catholic University of Paris.

While a doctoral candidate, from 2005 to 2010, Destivelle was also director of the Parisian scientific and ecclesial institute Istina, specialized in the field of Orthodox-Catholic dialogue.

== Priesthood ==
In 1994, he entered the Dominican Order and took his monastic vows, adopting the name Hyacinthe in honor of the French Dominican Hyacinthe-Marie Cormier who was beatified the same year. Just after his novitiate, John Paul II released his 1995 encyclical on ecumenism (titled in Latin: Ut unum sint, lit. 'That they may be one') to which Destivelle attributes his career interest in working towards Christian unity. Destivelle was ordained June 23, 2001.

=== Ministry in Russia ===
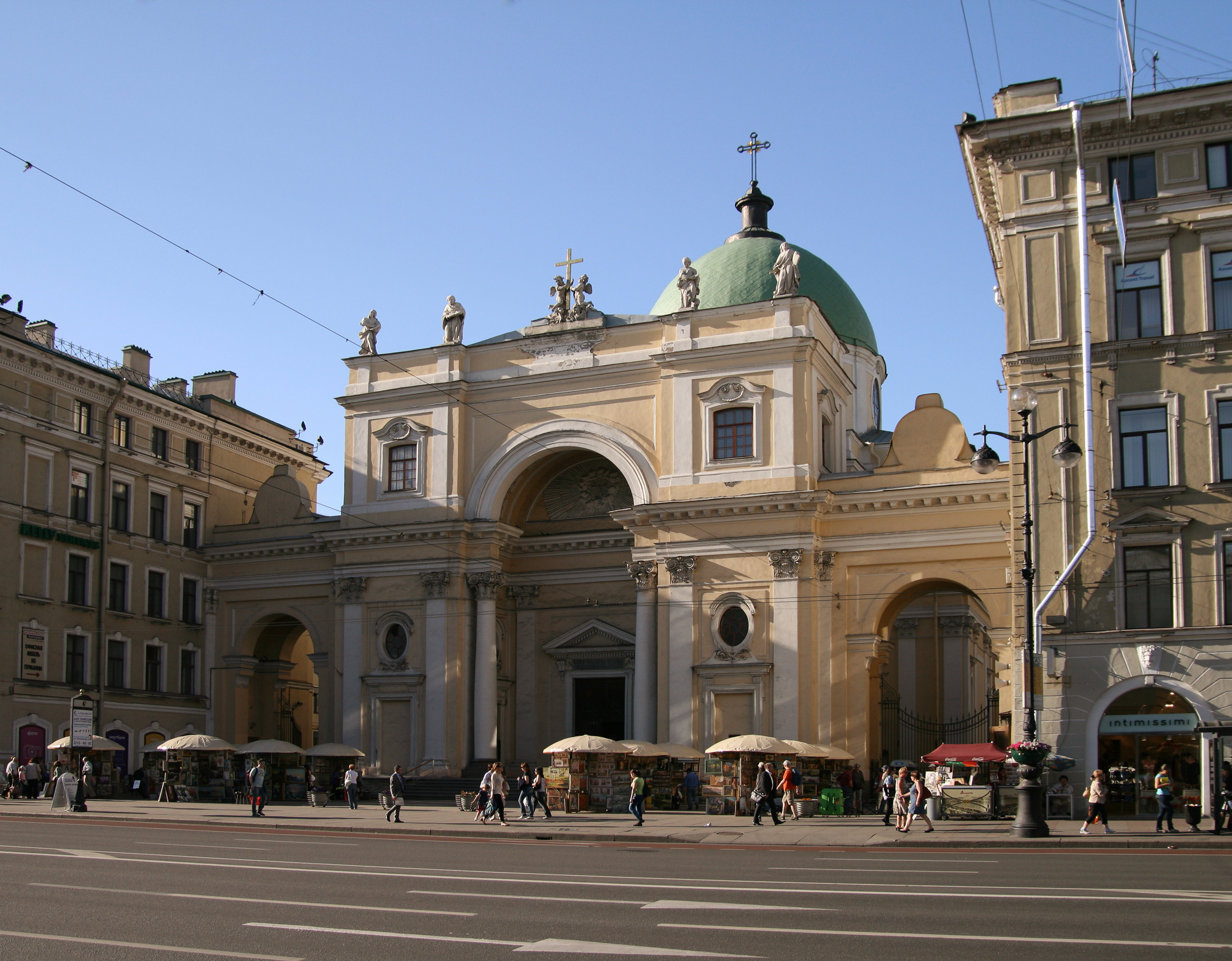
Destivelle was rector of the Church of St. Catherine in Saint Petersburg.

From August 2010 to July 2013, Destivelle was Dean of the Northwestern Region of the Archdiocese of the Mother of God in Moscow, Russia and Rector of the Church of St. Catherine on Nevsky Prospekt in Saint Petersburg, the oldest Catholic church in Russia.

=== Dicastery for Promoting Christian Unity ===
Since July 2013, he has been an official of the Dicastery for Promoting Christian Unity at the Vatican. He is also director of the Institute for Ecumenical Studies at the Pontifical University of Saint Thomas Aquinas. He is considered one of the Vatican's foremost experts on the Russian Orthodox Church and ecumenism with Eastern Catholicism and the Orthodox Church. He has been tapped repeatedly to manage Church relations with the Russian Orthodox Church, which is closely aligned with the Russian government.

On July 7, 2023, he was appointed as an expert at Pope Francis' Synod on Synodality.

== Personal life ==
Destivelle is fluent in French, English, Italian, and Russian, and literate in German and Spanish. He resides in the convent of Santi Domenico e Sisto church in Rome.

== Awards ==
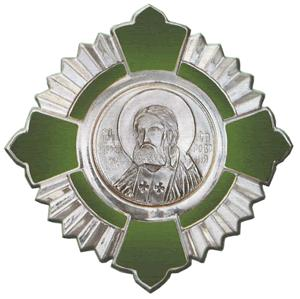
The Order of St. Seraphim, 3rd Class.

Order of St. Seraphim of Sarov, 3rd Class (2017) — Given by the Russian Orthodox Church "in consideration of the work of bringing the relics of St. Nicholas the Wonderworker."

== Publications ==
- Destiville, Hyacinthe (2022-06-20). "Tous, Quelques-uns, Un: Sensus fidei et dynamique synodale" [All, Some, One: Sensus fidei and synodal dynamics]. Communio (in French). 281/282 (3): 29–44. doi:10.3917/commun.281.0029.
- Destivelle, Hyacinthe (2020). Les chrétiens de l'Est après le Communisme. Éditions du Cerf. ISBN 978-2204137355.
- Destivelle, Hyacinthe (2018). Leading Her Towards Perfect Unity: Ecumenism and Synodality. Kurt Koch (foreword). Éditions du Cerf. ISBN 9782204127844.
- Destivelle, Hyacinthe (2010). Les Sciences théologiques en Russie: Réforme et renouveau des Académies ecclésiastiques au début du XXe siècle. Éditions du Cerf. ISBN 9782204090391.
- Destivelle, Hyacinthe (2009). "Prémisses d'une ecclésiologie eucharistique dans la théologie russe à la fin du XIXe siècle et au début du XXe siècle". In Van Cangh, Jean-Marie (ed.). L'Ecclésiologie eucharistique. Éditions du Cerf. ISBN 9782204089203.
- Destivelle, Hyacinthe (2006). The Moscow Council (1917–1918): The Creation of the Conciliar Institutions of the Russian Orthodox Church. Translated by Ryan, Jerry. Notre Dame Press. ISBN 9782204076494.
