= Mount Jumper =

Mountain in Ellsworth Land, Antarctica

Location of the Sentinel Range in Western Antarctica.

Sentinel Range map.

Mount Jumper (78°14′S 85°36′W) is a mountain 2,890 metres (9,480 ft) high located 7 nautical miles (13 km) east of Mount Viets in the central part of the Sentinel Range of the Ellsworth Mountains in Antarctica. Debren Pass separates it from the side ridge descending via Evans Peak. The mountain overlooks Ellen Glacier to the north and east, and its tributaries Patton Glacier and Rumyana Glacier to the south and northwest respectively.

Mount Jumper was first mapped by the United States Geological Survey from surveys and U.S. Navy air photos from 1957 to 1959, and was named by the Advisory Committee on Antarctic Names for Major Jesse T. Jumper of the United States Air Force who participated in establishing the South Pole Station in the 1956–57 season.

== See also ==
- Mountains in Antarctica

== Maps ==
- Vinson Massif. Scale 1:250 000 topographic map. Reston, Virginia: US Geological Survey, 1988.
- Antarctic Digital Database (ADD). Scale 1:250000 topographic map of Antarctica. Scientific Committee on Antarctic Research (SCAR). Since 1993, regularly updated.
