= Long Gables =

Mountain in Antarctika

Location of Sentinel Range in Western Antarctica.

Sentinel Range, USGS Map.

The Long Gables (78°11′S 86°14′W) are prominent twin peaks, with heights of 4,150 and 4,110 metres (13,620 and 13,480 ft), joined by a col, with the lower rock exposures being in the form of steep buttresses. The peaks rise from the main ridge of the Sentinel Range, Ellsworth Mountains, Antarctica between Mount Anderson and Mount Viets. They surmount Burdenis Glacier to the southeast, Gerila Glacier to the east and Fonfon Glacier to the northeast.

The peaks were discovered by the Marie Byrd Land Traverse party of 1957–58 under Charles R. Bentley, and were named for Jack B. Long. Jack Long was a member of the Marie Byrd Land Traverse party and a participant in many oversnow traverses and other Antarctic research activities in the following decade.

The south summit of Long Gables (Peak 4111) was climbed for the first time on January 13, 1996, by the French alpinists Erik Decamp and Catherine Destivelle.

== See also ==
- Mountains in Antarctica

== Maps ==
- Vinson Massif. Scale 1:250 000 topographic map. Reston, Virginia: US Geological Survey, 1988.
- Antarctic Digital Database (ADD). Scale 1:250000 topographic map of Antarctica. Scientific Committee on Antarctic Research (SCAR). Since 1993, regularly updated.
