= Ellen Glacier =

Glacier in Antarctica

- Location of Sentinel Range in Western Antarctica

- Location within Antarctica
- Location: Ellsworth Land
- Coordinates: 78°13′S 84°30′W
- Length: 22 nautical miles (41 km; 25 mi)
- Thickness: unknown
- Terminus: Rutford Ice Stream
- Status: unknown

Sentinel Range map.

The Ellen Glacier is a glacier in the central Sentinel Range of the Ellsworth Mountains of Antarctica. It drains the eastern slopes of Mount Anderson and Long Gables and flows generally southeast for 22 nautical miles (41 km; 25 mi) to Barnes Ridge, where it leaves the range and enters the south flowing Rutford Ice Stream.

It was first mapped by the United States Geological Survey from surveys and U.S. Navy air photos, 1957–59, and was named by the Advisory Committee on Antarctic Names for Lieutenant Colonel Cicero J. Ellen of the U.S. Air Force, who was in command of many of the air operations when the South Pole Station was established by air drop in the 1956–57 season.

== Tributary glaciers ==
- Pulpudeva Glacier
- Crosswell Glacier
- Patton Glacier
- Rumyana Glacier
- Delyo Glacier
- Burdenis Glacier
- Gerila Glacier
- Fonfon Glacier
- Arapya Glacier

== See also ==
- List of glaciers in the Antarctic
- Glaciology
