= Fonfon Glacier =

Glacier in Antarctica

- Location of Sentinel Range in Western Antarctica

- Location within Antarctica
- Location: Ellsworth Land
- Coordinates: 78°11′00″S 86°01′50″W
- Length: 2 nautical miles (3.7 km; 2.3 mi)
- Width: 1.2 nautical miles (2.2 km; 1.4 mi)
- Thickness: unknown
- Terminus: Ellen Glacier
- Status: unknown

Map of Sentinel Range.

Fonfon Glacier (Bulgarian: ледник Фонфон, romanized: lednik Fonfon, IPA: [ˈlɛdnik fonˈfɔn]) is the 4 km long and 2.3 km wide glacier on the east side of the main crest of north-central Sentinel Range in Ellsworth Mountains, Antarctica. It is situated north of Gerila Glacier and south of the head of Embree Glacier. The glacier drains the northeast slopes of the northern summit of Long Gables Peak and the southeast slopes of Mount Anderson, flows northeastwards and joins upper Ellen Glacier southeast of Eyer Peak.

The glacier is named after the Fonfon locality on Vitosha Mountain, Bulgaria.

== Location ==
Fonfon Glacier is centred at 78°11′00″S 86°01′50″W. US mapping in 1961 and 1988.

== See also ==
- List of glaciers in the Antarctic
- Glaciology

== Maps ==
- Vinson Massif. Scale 1:250 000 topographic map. Reston, Virginia: US Geological Survey, 1988.
- Antarctic Digital Database (ADD). Scale 1:250000 topographic map of Antarctica. Scientific Committee on Antarctic Research (SCAR). Since 1993, regularly updated.
