= Patricia Mawuli Nyekodzi =

Ghanaian pilot and engineer

- Born: 1988; Mepe, Ghana
- Occupations: Pilot and Aircraft Engineer

Patricia Mawuli Nyekodzi (born in 1988) is the first female Ghanaian certified pilot, aircraft engineer,

teacher and trainer and the only female qualified to build Rotax Aircraft Engines.

== Early life ==
Mawuli grew up in a mud shack in Mepe, a small rural village in the Volta Region of Ghana. She developed the love for flying after spending years watching planes passing overhead.

At the age of 19, Mawuli went to look for employment at Kpong Airfield but was turned down by the airfield's technical director, Jonathan Porter. He employed her to weed around the school and pull stumps from the runway, when she offered her services for free. Mawuli skilfully cut the trees, showing analytical ability to determine the most efficient means of extraction. Porter recognized the same skill when he asked her to help him with an airplane he was assembling. Mawuli's ability to quickly learn, master the skills and tools used to build an airplane, prompted Porter to give her a paid job as his apprentice and teach her to fly.

== Career ==
Mawuli became Ghana's first female civilian pilot in 2009. She is also the first black African to be certified to build Rotax Aircraft Engines, as well as the first woman in West Africa to be certified to build and maintain Rotax engines.

Porter and Mawuli set up an aviation school, Aviation and Technology Academy Ghana, known as AvTech, in early 2010 where she trained four girls per year. The girls are trained to build and maintain ultralight aircraft, flight instructions, airfield operations, robotics engineering and computers. Putting her own salary into the school, she focuses on educating girls from rural backgrounds who might otherwise not have educational opportunities.

Mawuli became an instructor at the Kpong Airfield where she taught at AvTech. In 2013 she was appointed as the managing director of Operations for Kpong Airfield. Mawuli pilots as a volunteer with Medicine on the Move, an organization that works together with the Aviation Academy to transport doctors, deliver medical supplies and services, as well as health education to rural communities across the length and breadth of Ghana. She occasionally dropped. educational pamphlets over remote villages.
