= Drahşan Arda =

First female football referee

- Born: 1945 (age 80–81); Edirne, Turkey
- Other occupation: School teacher
Years		Role
1968–1997		Referee

Drahşan Arda (born 1945) is a Turkish former association football referee. She was confirmed as the world's first female football referee by FIFA.

== Early life ==
A native of Edirne, she played basketball and volleyball during her high school years. She then developed an interest for football. She became a schoolteacher by profession. Arda obtained her referee certificate after completing a referee training held by Tarık Yamaç in Zonguldak Province, Turkey between 5–27 November 1967.

== Referee career ==
She debuted as an assistant referee during a regional league match between Karabük Demirçelik and Jandarmagücü. She then was promoted to the role of a referee. She was mostly in charge in friendly matches. She officiated her first match on 26 June 1968. It was a show match between the teams of jockeys against the actors that took place before the jubilee match for Ahmet Berman at the Mithatpaşa Stadium in Istanbul.

In 1972, she moved to Munich, Germany. She worked in Bavaria as a schoolteacher, and helped many children start with sport. She continued to officiate football games. She served mostly in classification matches, which were played with a single referee. She developed a relationship with FC Bayern Munich.

== Awards and retirement ==
She was awarded a golden badge and a plaque by the Bayerischer Fussball-Verband (BFV) for her 30 years of refereeing activity.

After her application with documented evidence, FIFA confirmed with a letter dated 13 December 2018 that Arda is the world's first female football referee.

In 1997, she retired from active sport life after 30 years. She put all her refereeing materials up for auction for the benefit of poor children. Afterwards, she served on the Disciplinary Board of the BFV for seven years.
