= Ivano Ghirardini =

French mountaineer (born 1953)

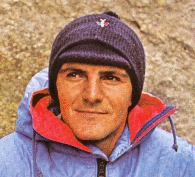
Ivano Ghirardini in 1982

Ivano Ghirardini (born 1 May 1953) is a French mountaineer.

== Early life ==
He was born in Montefiorino in Emilia-Romagna. He left Italy with his family in 1954 and was naturalized in 1972.

He attended school in Marseille, earning a Baccalaureate in mathematics. He learned to climb in Château-Arnoux-Saint-Auban and at Sisteron.

== North face trilogy ==
In 1975, he made his first solo winter ascent of the north face of the Grandes Jorasses via the Shroud (Le Linceul). In January 1977, he attempted a winter solo ascent of the Matterhorn, but failed due to a storm. However, he was successful on his second attempt in December of the same year. He soloed the Grandes Jorasses again in January 1978 (the Croz Spur), and then the north face of Eiger in March 1978, thereby becoming the first mountaineer to solo all three of the "trilogy" (the north faces of the Matterhorn, Grandes Jorasses and Eiger) in winter.

== K2 ==
He attempted K2 twice in 1979, both times having to give up due to stormy conditions. He made a solo bivouac without oxygen at 8,300m.

== Mitre Peak ==
In 1980, Ghirardini climbed Mitre Peak in the Karakoram in Pakistan, again solo. He is the only mountaineer to date to have done so.

== Aconcagua ==
First solo climb of the south wall, in four days, following the French Route-1954 and taking the Messner's variation, reached the summit in January 1981 making this remarkable first.

== Reve Ephemere D’Alpiniste, Grandes Jorasses ==
Ghirardini, 1994, V 5, 6a, A2, 65°, 800m, between pt Margarita and pt Young, ephemeral couloir. The first part was climbed with Slavko Sveticic, then Ghirardini soloed the last section.

== New routes ==
- Aig.Pierre André, Three super "dirictissimes" on East, North and South Face, all ED.
- Aiguille de Saussure, "Vacances d'alpinistes", with Joshua Geetter.
- Aiguille Noire de Peuterey, Hard route on NE face, ED, with Joshua Geetter.
- Grandes Jorasses, Pointe Young, "Cristal Palace", a solo ascent.
- Pointe Durier, Hard new route on SW face, with Franck and Philippe Henry.
