= Juana Miranda =

Ecuadorian obstetrician (1842–1914)

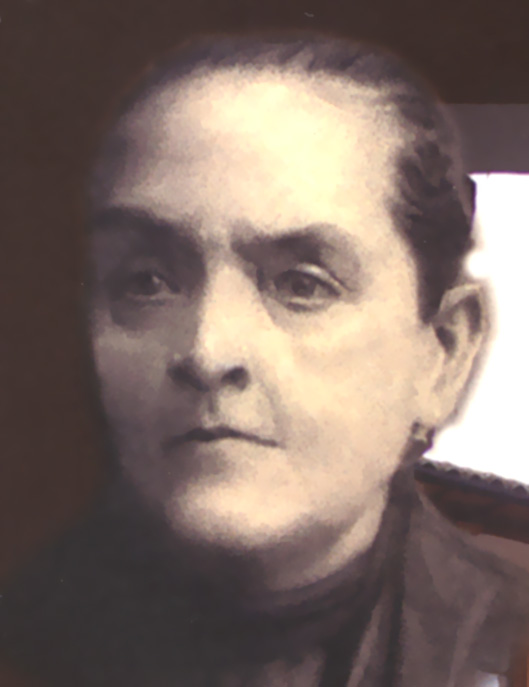
- Born: Juana Miranda Petrona; 1842; Quito, Ecuador
- Died: 1914 (aged 71–72); Quito, Ecuador
- Occupations: Obstetrician, midwife, professor

Juana Miranda Petrona (1842–1914) was an Ecuadorian obstetrician and the first female university professor in Ecuador.

== Early life and education ==
Juana Miranda Petrona was the first of five children. Her parents were Sebastiana de la Pulla Corteza and Julián Santa María Miranda. Her maternal grandmother, Francisca Miranda, was a native of Venezuela and linked by marriage to the Venezuelan independence leader Francisco de Miranda. As a sign of Julián's respect for Francisca, his mother, he gave his children the first surname Miranda. For this reason, Juana was given the surname Miranda and not the surname Santa María, which was the father's first surname.

Miranda Petrona began work in the San Juan de Dios Hospital in the 1850s. She was motivated by a desire to serve, the example her parents set for her, and the severe poverty that afflicted the majority of the Ecuadorian population. Her work made her widely recognized.

In 1861, when she was 19 years old, Miranda Petrona was named the abbess of the Hospital de Caridad ("Charity Hospital"). The hospital treated sick prisoners in addition to regular patients, and Miranda Petrona gave prisoners the same treatment that she did others. Later, in 1862, she was a major sergeant, assisting the army during the Ecuadorian–Colombian War.

President Gabriel García Moreno brought the midwife Amelia Sióv de Bezacón from the women's hospital in Paris so she could create a similar hospital in Quito and teach obstetrics. Miranda Petrona was one of her students. Miranda Petrona graduated as a midwife with the first class of students. She was intended to replace Sióv de Bezacón; however, the school was closed after García Moreno's assassination. Miranda Petrona dedicated the rest of her life to having the school reopened.

== Professional career ==
In 1866, Juana Miranda Patrona had a paid job, which was unusual for a woman in Quito at the time. She made 96 pesos a year. Miranda Patrona had hospital experience, unlike most of her contemporaries. Beyond her work achievements, Miranda Patrona had success because of the strength of her character. Defending women's right to work would be another constant in her life; this activism began with her own professional education. In 1870, she enrolled as a medical student in the Central University of Ecuador with the goal of studying obstetrics. She graduated in 1874. In 1876, she directed the military hospital in Chimborazo Province.

These obstetrics classes at the university were part of President García Moreno's larger plan to create a women's hospital in Quito. Miranda Petrona longed to direct such a hospital; however, with the assassination of García Moreno in 1875, her dreams were frustrated. After the closure of the women's hospital, Miranda Petrona and her husband left Ecuador.

From 1877 to 1878, Miranda Petrona worked in Santiago.

She later returned to Ecuador with the goal of becoming a professor. She became Ecuador's first female university professor when she began teaching obstetrics at the Central University of Ecuador. The career was viewed as women's work. As such, the School of Practical Obstetrics was the only female professional school in Ecuador at the time. The General Council made Miranda Petrona a professor on May 4, 1891. Among her medical students was Isidro Ayora, who would later become the director of Quito women's hospital.

On November 1, 1899, after a long fight, Juana Miranda Petrona founded a women's hospital in Quito, then known as "Vallejo Rodríguez Asylum." In 1900, Miranda Petrona competed with others to be the faculty chair representing obstetrics at the Central University of Ecuador. She became the faculty chair when she was 57. She occupied this position from 1900 to 1907, Miranda Petrona was the director of the women's hospital.

== Personal life ==
In 1877, Juana Miranda Petrona married the painter José de Jesús Araujo, with whom she had four children. Due to the intense power dispute between Antonio Borrero and Ignacio de Veintemilla, both briefly fled Ecuador for Chile in the late 1870s.

== Legacy ==
In 2005, the School of Obstetrics at the Central University of Ecuador was named for Juana Miranda Petrona.
