= Debren Pass =

Location of Sentinel Range in Western Antarctica.

Sentinel Range map.

Debren Pass (Bulgarian: проход Дебрен, ‘Prohod Debren’ \'pro-hod 'de-bren\) is the ice-covered saddle of elevation 2245 m on the east side of Sentinel Range in Ellsworth Mountains, Antarctica separating Mount Jumper from the side ridge descending via Evans Peak. It is part of the glacial divide between Rumyana Glacier and Patton Glacier.

The feature is named after the settlement of Debren in southwestern Bulgaria.

== Location ==
Debren Pass is located at 78°15′57″S 85°43′07″W, which is 3.6 km west of Mount Jumper, 9.35 km north-northwest of Mount Bearskin, and 6.3 km northeast of Evans Peak. US mapping in 1988.

== Maps ==
- Vinson Massif. Scale 1:250 000 topographic map. Reston, Virginia: US Geological Survey, 1988.
- Antarctic Digital Database (ADD). Scale 1:250000 topographic map of Antarctica. Scientific Committee on Antarctic Research (SCAR). Since 1993, regularly updated.
