= Great north faces of the Alps =

Most famous alpine climbing routes

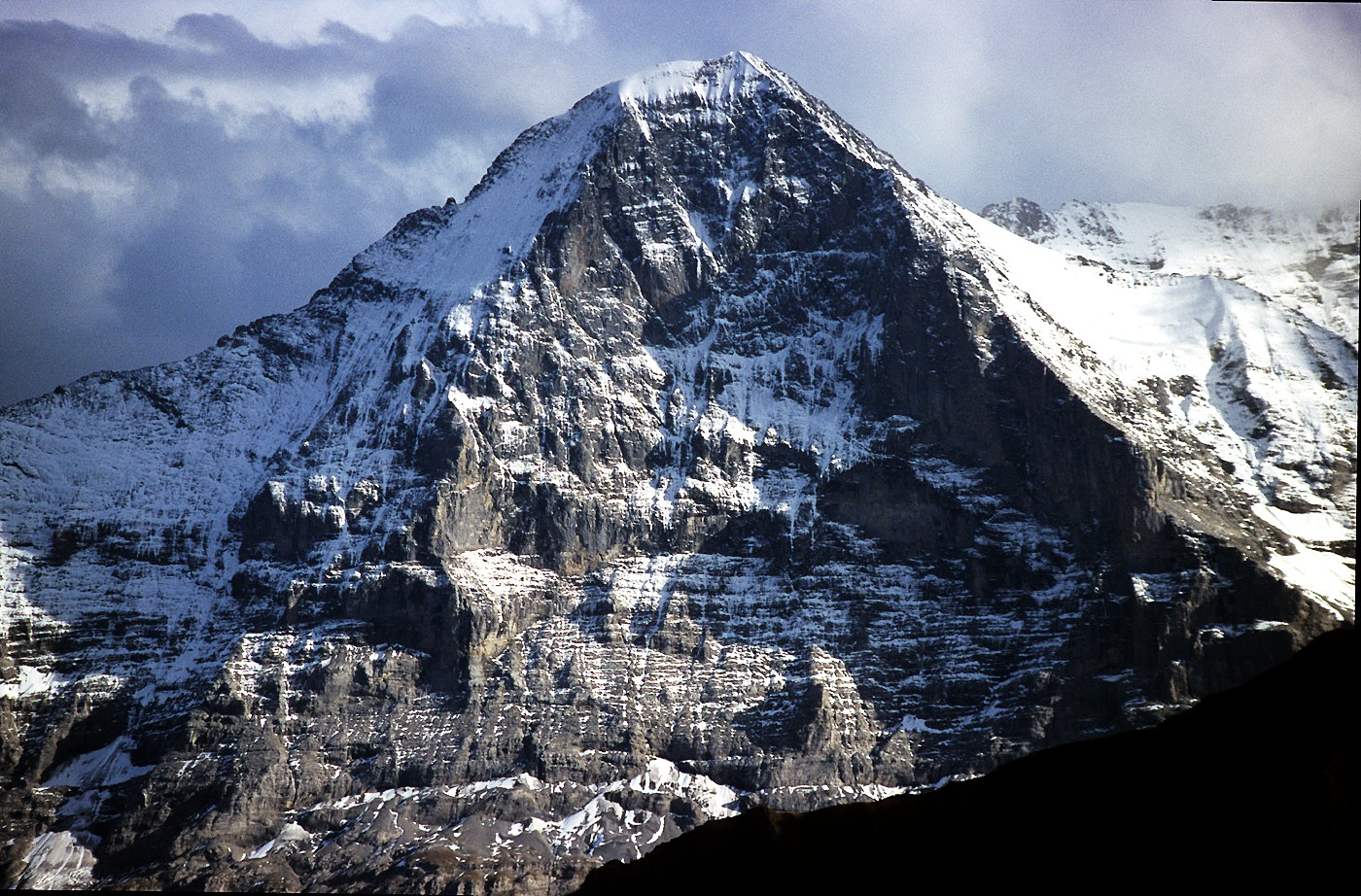
The north face of the Eiger

The six great north faces of the Alps are a group of vertical faces in the Swiss, French, and Italian Alps known in alpine climbing for their technical difficulty, high level of objective danger, and great height. The "Trilogy" is the name given to three hardest of these north faces, being the north face Eiger, the Grandes Jorasses, and the Matterhorn.

== List ==
The six great north faces are (sorted by the date of the first ascent of the north face):

- Matterhorn, first ascent in August 1931;
- Cima Grande di Lavaredo, first ascent in 1933;
- Petit Dru, first ascent in 1935;
- Piz Badile, first ascent July 1937;
- Eiger, first ascent in July 1938;
- Grandes Jorasses, first ascent in August 1938.

=== Trilogy ===
Three of the six great north faces — the Eiger, the Matterhorn, and the Grandes Jorasses – are considered by climbers to be much harder to climb and are known as 'the Trilogy' (or the "North Face trilogy").

== Milestones and records ==
- Riccardo Cassin and Liugi "Gino" Esposito made the first ascent of two of the faces (the Piz Badile and the Grandes Jorasses) on both occasions they climbed in a rope of three, accompanied by a third climber.
- The first climber to have ascended all six north faces was Gaston Rébuffat, a French alpinist and mountain guide, who chronicled his feat in his 1954 work, Etoiles et Tempêtes (Starlight and Storm). The Eiger was the last of the six for Rébuffat and with that ascent he also became the first person to complete the "Trilogy".
- The first climber to ascend all six north faces in a single year was the Austrian Leo Schlömmer, from the summer of 1961 to the summer of 1962. In 1993 Alison Hargreaves became the first woman to achieve this feat, with a combined time of less than 24 hours.
- In 1971 Michiko Imai became the first Japanese woman to climb the "Trilogy". She has also been credited as the first woman in the world known to have achieved that.
- Ivano Ghirardini was the first person to climb the "Trilogy" in winter, solo (1977–78), and Catherine Destivelle was the first woman (1992-93-94) to complete the solo winter trilogy.
- In 1985, Christophe Profit was the first person to solo the “Trilogy” in less than 24 hours. In 1987 he completed the a winter solo of the “Trilogy” over a period of 40 hours.
- With the introduction of the concept of enchainment, the next challenge was to climb all three faces in one outing, a race eventually won by Tomo Česen in 1986 at the age of 26, although nobody witnessed his feat; after that Christophe Profit, who achieved the feat between 11–12 March 1987 in a time of 24 hours.
- From December 2014 to March 2015, during a project known as "Starlight and Storms", Tom Ballard, the son of Alison Hargreaves, climbed these six north faces solo, being the first person to complete this feat in a single winter season without a support team. A film chronicling this project, Tom, won several awards at international film festivals.
- On 15 August 2021, with his ascent of the Petit Dru in 1 hour 43 minutes, the Swiss climber Dani Arnold completed a ten-year project to make the fastest solo speed climb of all six faces. He had previously set speed records on the other five faces, with Ueli Steck's 2015 solo of the Eiger north face the only current faster ascent (when Arnold climbed the Eiger north face in 2011 in two hours and 28 minutes it was the fastest at that date).

== Gallery ==
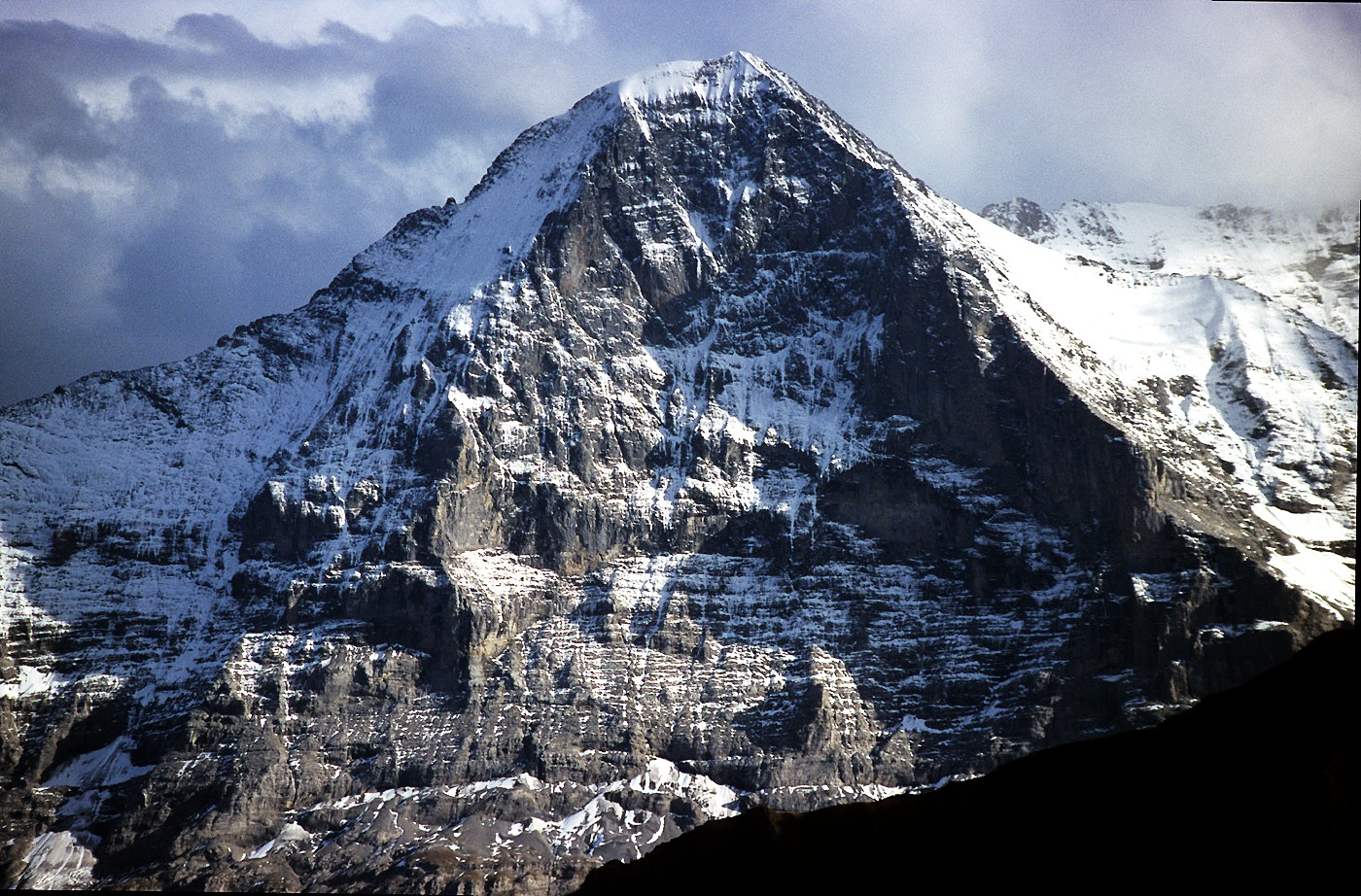
North face of the Eiger

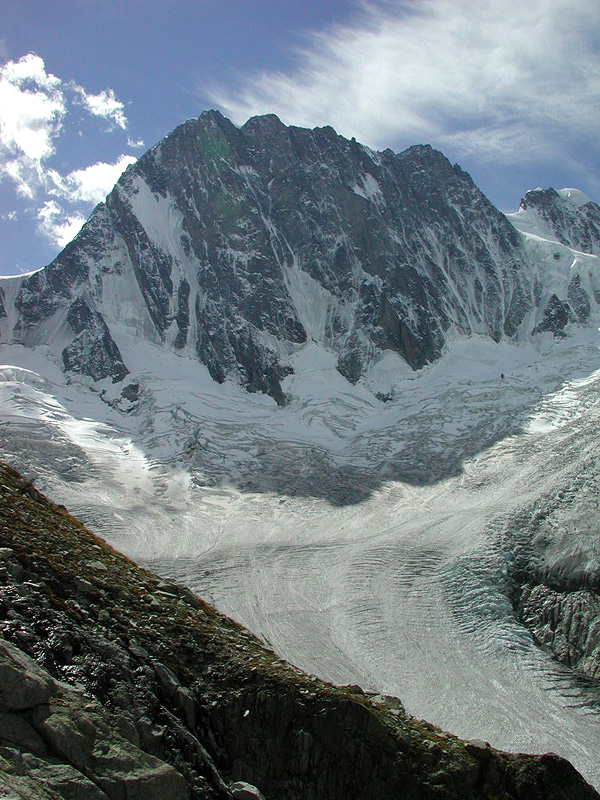
North faces of Grandes Jorasses

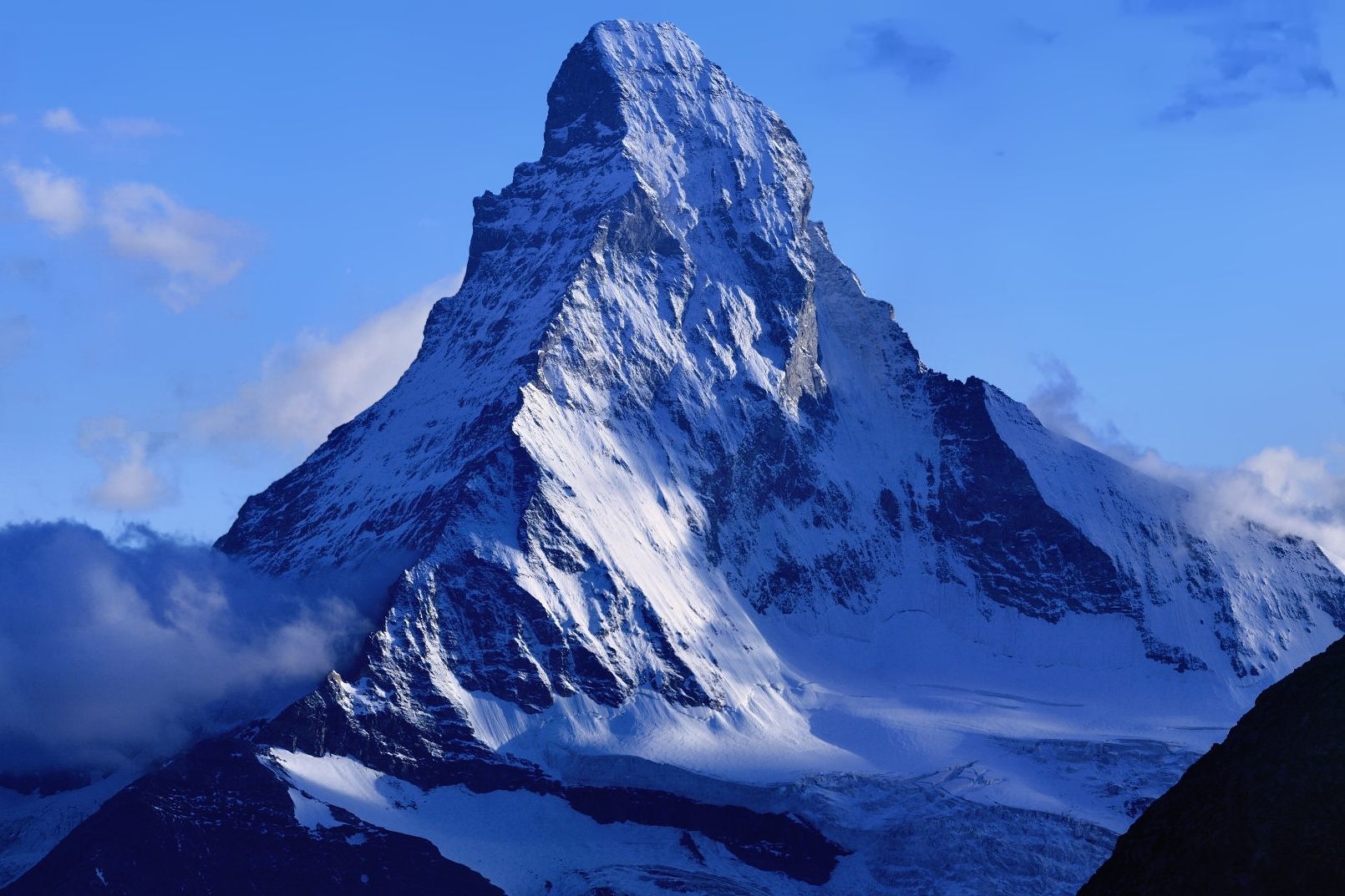
North face of the Matterhorn

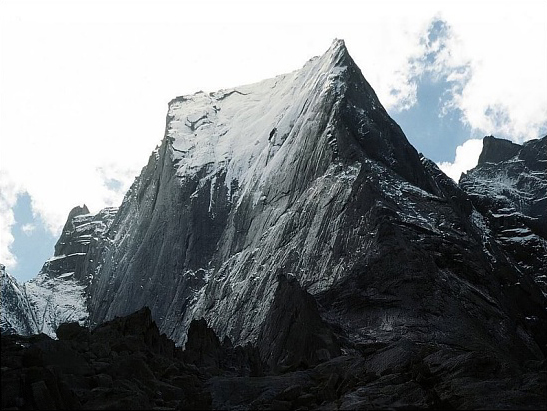
North-east face of Piz Badile

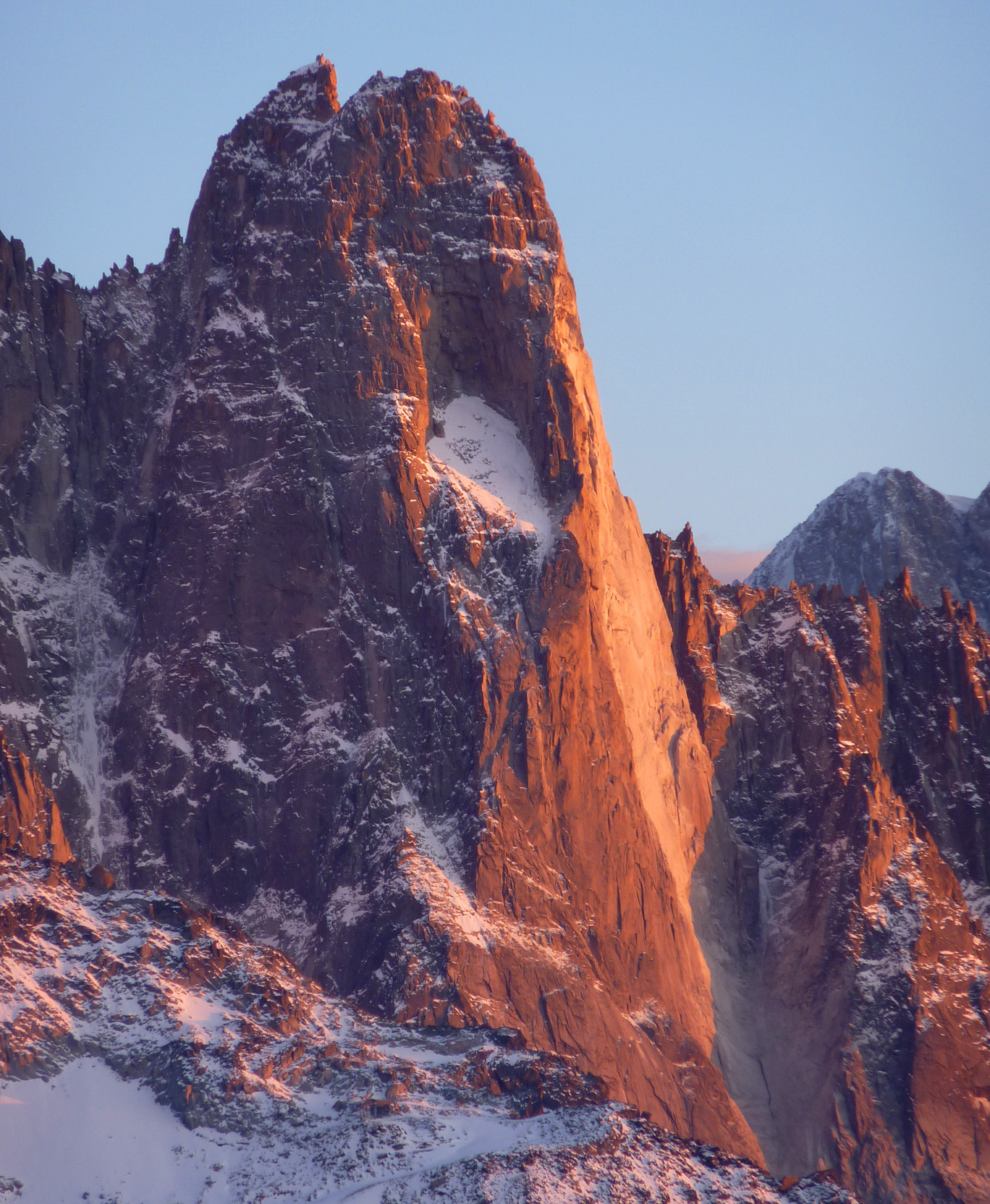
North face of the Petit Dru

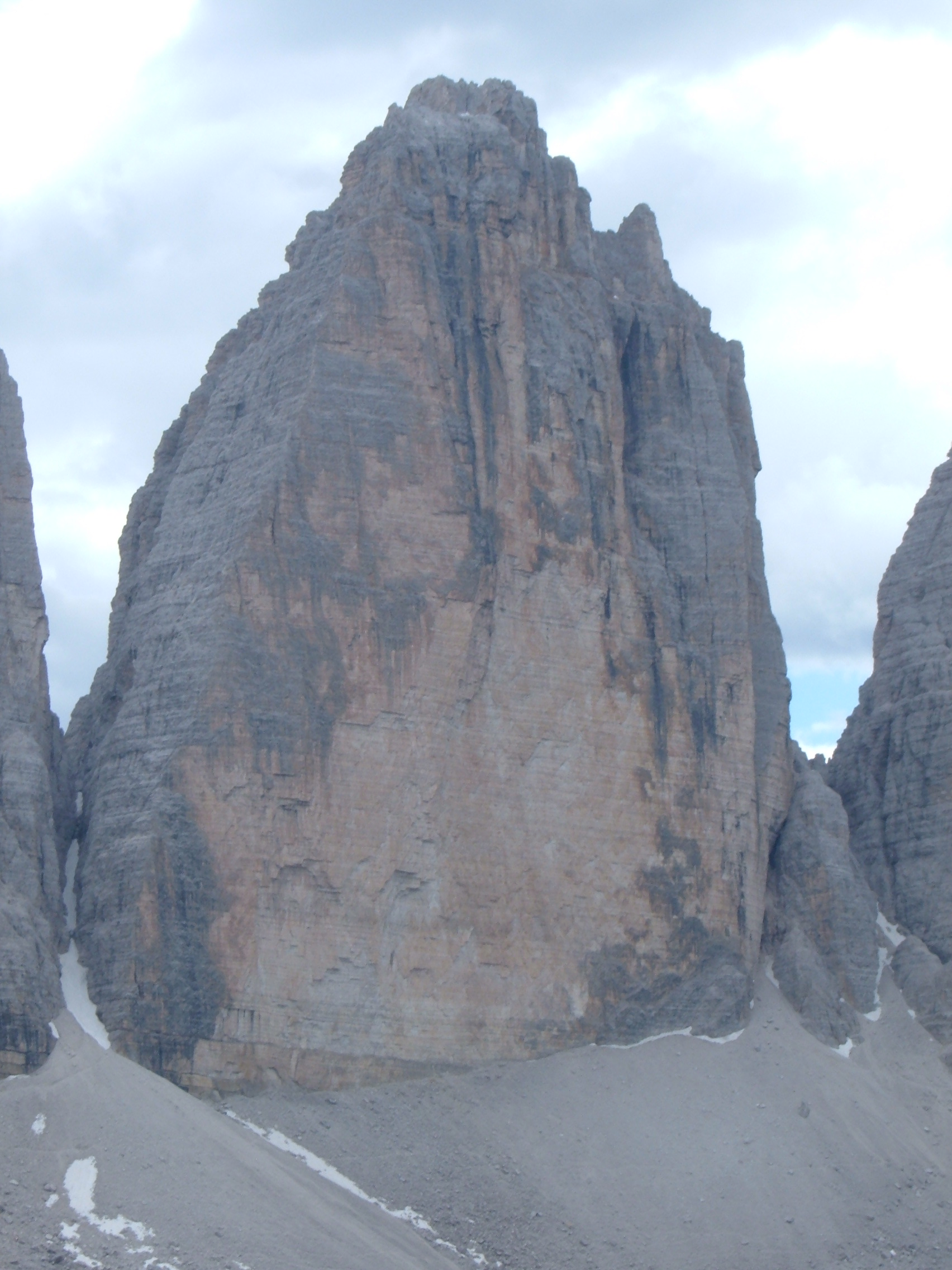
North face of Cima Grande di Lavaredo

== Bibliography ==
- Anker, Daniel (ed.) (2000) Eiger: The Vertical Arena. Seattle: The Mountaineers.
- Bonatti, Walter (2001). The Mountains of My Life. Modern Library. ISBN 9780375756405.
- Hargreaves, Alison (1995). A Hard Day's Summer: Six Classic North Faces Solo. London: Hodder & Stoughton. ISBN 0-340-60602-9
- Rébuffat, Gaston (1999). Starlight and Storm: The Conquest of the Great North Faces of the Alps. New York: Modern Library. ISBN 0-375-75506-3
- Destivelle, Catherine (2003). Ascensions, Arthaud (French) (ISBN 2-7003-9594-8)
- Destivelle, Catherine (2015). Rock Queen, Hayloft Publishing Ltd (ISBN 978-1910237076)
