= Michiko Imai =

Japanese mountaineer (born 1942)

Michiko Imai (今井通子) (born 1 February 1942) is a Japanese medical doctor, mountaineer and alpinist. She is notable for making the first all-female ascent of the north face of the Matterhorn, and for being the only female member of the Japanese team of mountaineers who established the Japanese Direct alpine climbing route on the north face of the Eiger. She was also the first Japanese woman to scale all of the three great north faces of the Alps (the Matterhorn, the Eiger, and the Grandes Jorasses), and has been credited as the first woman in the world to have achieved that.

== Early Life ==
Michiko Imai was born in Tokyo on 1 February 1942, the daughter of two medical doctors. She graduated from Tokyo Women's Medical University in 1966 as a Doctor of Medicine and specialised in urology.

== Alpine north face trilogy ==
After making a series of major alpine climbing ascents in the late 1960s and early 1970s, she became the first Japanese woman to scale the three great north faces of the Alps (the Matterhorn, the Eiger, and the Grandes Jorasses), and has been credited as the first woman in the world known to have achieved that. (Note: Yvette Vaucher made the first female ascent of the Matterhorn North face in 1965, two years before Michiko. Vaucher went on to climb the other two major alpine north faces but her successful ascent of the Eiger north wall was not until 1975. Daisy Voog was the first woman to climb Eiger's North face (in 1964) but her ascent of the Eiger has been reported as her only major alpine feat. The first female ascent of the north face of the Grandes Jorasses was made by Loulou Boulaz in 1952. She made four attempts on the north face of the Eiger but was not successful. In 1967 Christine de Colombel made the second female ascent of the Eiger's north face, in 1969 she also climbed the north face of the Grandes Jorasses but she was not successful on the north face of the Eiger.)

- 1967: In July 1967, whilst a member of Tokyo Women's Medical University Alpine Club, Michiko Imai and her friend Yoshiko Wakayama made the first all female ascent of the Matterhorn's north face.
- 1969: first ascent of the Japanese Direct on the Eiger North face.
- 1971: ascent of the Grandes Jorasses North Face in July 1971.

== Japanese Direct on the Eiger North face ==
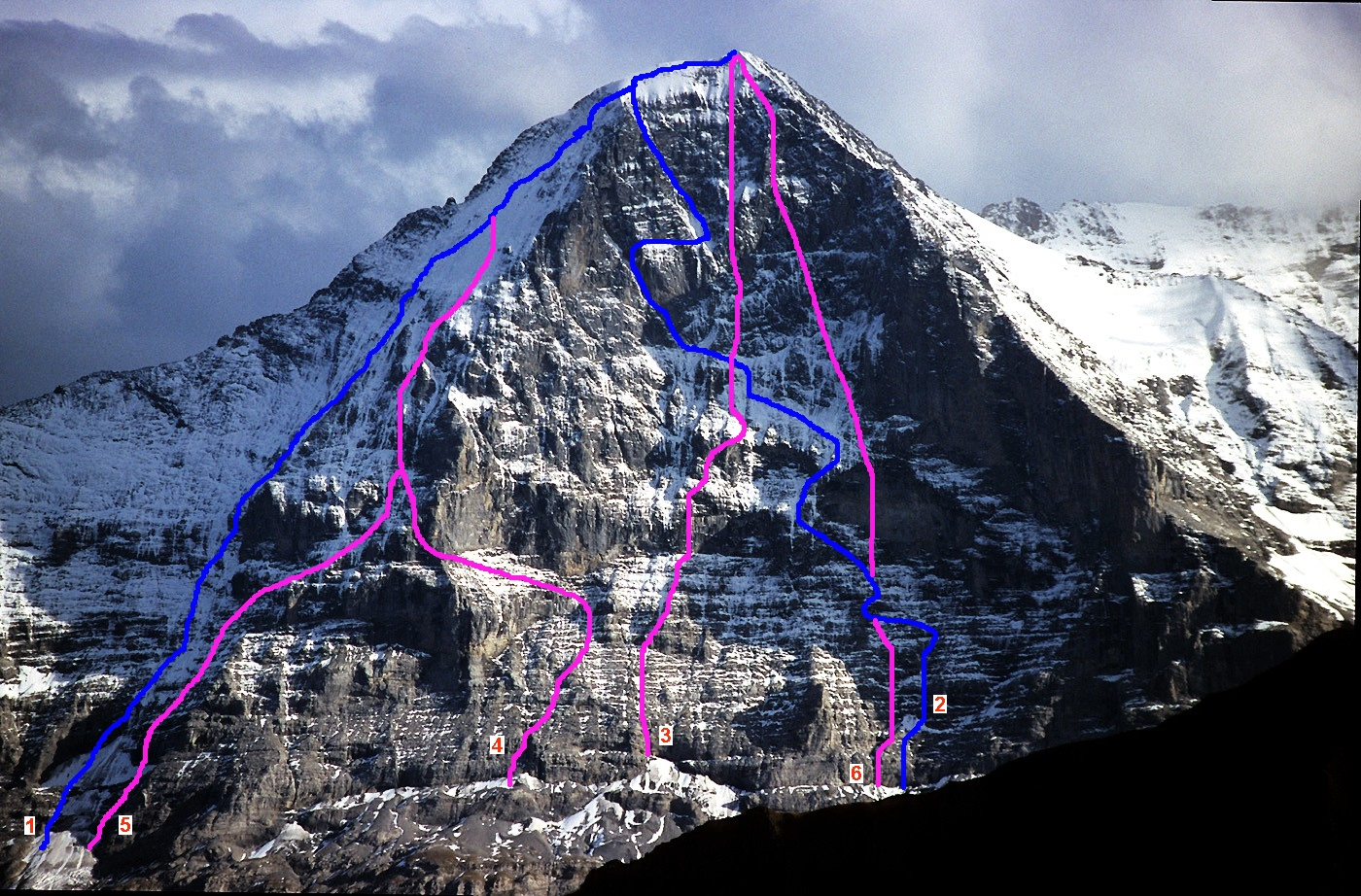
The Japanese Direct is line (6)

Michiko Imai was the only female member of a six person team which made the first ascent of the Japanese Direct climbing route on the Eiger North face. The leader was Takio Kato, other team members were his brother Yasuo Kato, Satoru Nigishi, Amano Hirofumi and Susumu Kubo. The group was drawn from the Japanese Expert Climber's Club, a small club made up of some of the best climbers in Japan.

In 1969 they travelled from Japan on the Trans-Siberian railway. Their intention was to attempt the second ascent of the Harlin Route which had been established three years earlier. But, after some "warm-up" climbs in the Dolomites, they met Toni Hiebeler, who had made the first winter ascent of the north face and suggested they attempt a new line crossing the overhanging Rote Fluh to the right of both the Harlin route and Heckmair's 1938 Route. They spent almost a month establishing their new route, the Japanese Direct.

== Himalayan expeditions ==
After her success in the European Alps Michiko took part in a number of expeditions to the Himalaya, including several eight-thousanders, and she was frequently the leader of teams which were otherwise composed only of male mountaineers. These expeditions included:

- 1975 Dhaulagiri IV 7,661 m (25,135 ft): she was expedition doctor for a team led by her husband. Several members of the team reached the summit but she was driven back by bad weather on her summit bid.
- 1979 She was leader of an expedition comprising nineteen Japanese men and herself which successfully completed a multi-day traverse of Dhaulagiri II, III and V.
- Over the winter of 1983/84 she led an 18-member team which attempted to climb Mount Everest from the northern side. Another Japanese team which was led by Michiko's husband, Kazuyuki Takahashi, were climbing the mountain from Nepal in the south and the two groups intended to link up. The team from Nepal made a successful winter ascent of Everest. Michiko's team were ascending from Tibet via the 1980 Japanese route on the north face and reached a high point, at 26,575 ft (8,100 m), in the Hornbein Couloir on 30 November 1983. Further attempts were made to reach the summit but those were unsuccessful and Michiko's party withdrew on 10 January 1984.
- 1988 She led an expedition to Cho Oyu where her husband, the mountaineer Kazuyuki Takahashi, descended from the summit to base camp in a paraglider. The following day Michiko herself reached the summit.

== Professional and personal life ==
She married the mountaineer Kazuyuki Takahashi in 1971. Her married name is often used in later mountaineering publications but she continued to use her birth name in her professional work.

In 1979 she received the Asahi Sports Award and in 2023 she was made an Honorary Citizen of Tokyo.

In later life she became involved in Forest therapy and shinrin-yoku, was a visiting professor at Tokyo University of Agriculture and a president of the International Society of Natural and Forest Medicine and has continued to co-author peer reviewed academic publications.

In 2019 Grindelwald Museum launched a special exhibition to mark the fiftieth anniversary of her ascent of the Eiger's north face and in 2025 Mammut used the story of her role in the Eiger ascent to launch a range of clothing designed by Nigel Cabourn.
