= Ouma Laouali =

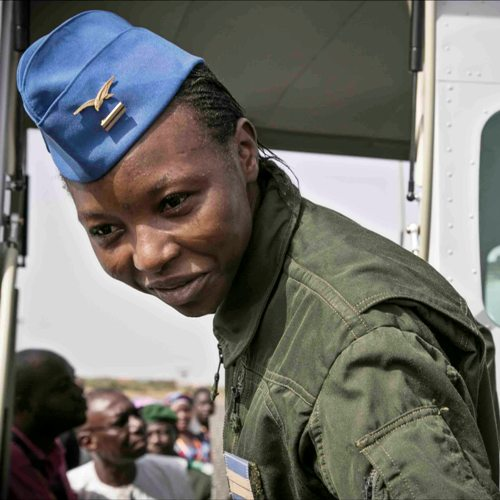
- Laouali in 2015
- Born: Niger
- Military career
- Allegiance: Niger
- Rank: Lieutenant
- Conflicts: Boko Haram insurgency

Ouma Laouali is a Nigerien pilot, and the first woman to serve as a pilot in the country.

In October 2015, Lieutenant Laouali, aged 28, became the first woman pilot in Niger.

Laouali was one of a coterie of members of the Nigerien airforce to be trained as pilots in the United States, as part of a programme to help in fighting Boko Haram, the Islamist terrorist group active in the region. She will be flying a Cessna airplane, two of which were given to Niger by the US in a ceremony in Niger's capital Niamey, as part of the US$24 million package of training and aircraft. As of October 2015, the US has a drone base in Niamey, and is reported to be building another in Agadez a town in the Nigerien desert, as part of its counter-terrorism activities.

Laouali will be flying the Cessna 208 Caravan, an intelligence, surveillance, and reconnaissance (ISR) aircraft, which can perform a variety of military tasks.

According to Ventures Africa, "female pilots challenge sexist views that men are better suited as pilots." True Africa included Laouali in their list of "The African women who rocked it in 2015".
