= Mount Viets =

Mountain in Ellsworth Land, Antarctica

Location of Sentinel Range in Western Antarctica

Sentinel Range map

Mount Viets (78°15′13″S 86°06′50″W) is a sharp pyramidal mountain over 3,600 m, standing 1.5 nautical miles (2.8 km) north of Mount Giovinetto in the main ridge of the Sentinel Range, Ellsworth Mountains. It surmounts Delyo Glacier to the east and Burdenis Glacier to the northeast.

The mountain was discovered by the Marie Byrd Land Traverse party of 1957–58 under Charles R. Bentley. It was named for Ronald L. Viets, a geophysicist at Little America V Station in 1957. It was climbed for the first time on January 11, 1996, by the French alpinists Erik Decamp and Catherine Destivelle.

== Maps ==
- Vinson Massif. Scale 1:250 000 topographic map. Reston, Virginia: US Geological Survey, 1988.
- Antarctic Digital Database (ADD). Scale 1:250000 topographic map of Antarctica. Scientific Committee on Antarctic Research (SCAR). Since 1993, regularly updated.
