= Delyo Glacier =

Glacier in Antarctica

- Location of Sentinel Range in Western Antarctica

- Location within Antarctica
- Location: Ellsworth Land
- Coordinates: 78°15′20″S 86°00′10″W
- Length: 4.3 nautical miles (8.0 km; 4.9 mi)
- Width: 1.5 nautical miles (2.8 km; 1.7 mi)
- Thickness: unknown
- Terminus: Ellen Glacier
- Status: unknown

Map of Sentinel Range.

Delyo Glacier (Bulgarian: Дельов ледник, romanized: Delyov lednik, IPA: [ˈdɛʎof ˈlɛdnik]) is the 8 km long and 2.7 km wide glacier on the east side of the main crest of north-central Sentinel Range in Ellsworth Mountains, Antarctica. It is situated northwest of Rumyana Glacier and south of Burdenis Glacier. The glacier drains the north slopes of Mount Giovinetto and the east slopes of Mount Viets, flows northeastwards and together with Burdenis Glacier and Gerila Glacier joins upper Ellen Glacier north of Bruguière Peak.

The glacier is named after the Bulgarian rebel leader Delyo Voyvoda (17–18th century).

== Location ==
Delyo Glacier is centred at 78°15′20″S 86°00′10″W. US mapping in 1961 and 1988.

== See also ==
- List of glaciers in the Antarctic
- Glaciology

== Maps ==
- Vinson Massif. Scale 1:250 000 topographic map. Reston, Virginia: US Geological Survey, 1988.
- Antarctic Digital Database (ADD). Scale 1:250000 topographic map of Antarctica. Scientific Committee on Antarctic Research (SCAR). Since 1993, regularly updated.
