= Mount Giovinetto =

Mountain in Ellsworth Land, Antarctica

Location of Sentinel Range in Western Antarctica.

Sentinel Range map.

Mount Giovinetto (78°16′S 86°10′W) is the summit of a buttress-type mountain (4,090 m) located 2 nautical miles (3.7 km) north of Mount Ostenso and 1.5 nautical miles (2.8 km) south of Mount Viets in the main ridge of the Sentinel Range, Antarctica. It surmounts Rumyana Glacier to the east and Delyo Glacier to the northeast.

The mountain was discovered by the Charles R. Bentley-led Marie Byrd Land Traverse party, 1957–58, and named after Mario Giovinetto, glaciologist at Byrd Station in 1957.

== See also ==
- Mountains in Antarctica

== Maps ==
- Vinson Massif. Scale 1:250 000 topographic map. Reston, Virginia: US Geological Survey, 1988.
- Antarctic Digital Database (ADD). Scale 1:250000 topographic map of Antarctica. Scientific Committee on Antarctic Research (SCAR). Since 1993, regularly updated.
