= Rumyana Glacier =

Glacier in Antarctica

- Location of Sentinel Range in Western Antarctica

- Location within Antarctica
- Type: tributary
- Location: Ellsworth Land
- Coordinates: 78°16′00″S 85°50′00″W
- Length: 6 nautical miles (11 km; 6.9 mi)
- Width: 2 nautical miles (3.7 km; 2.3 mi)
- Thickness: unknown
- Terminus: Ellen Glacier
- Status: unknown

Sentinel Range map

Rumyana Glacier (Bulgarian: ледник Румяна, romanized: lednik Rumyana, IPA: [ˈlɛdnik roˈmʲanɐ]) is the 6 nautical miles (11 km; 6.9 mi) long and 2 nautical miles (3.7 km; 2.3 mi) wide glacier on the east side of north-central Sentinel Range in Ellsworth Mountains, Antarctica, situated northwest of Patton Glacier and southeast of Delyo Glacier. It drains the east slopes of Mount Giovinetto and the north slopes of Evans Peak, and flows northeastwards to join Ellen Glacier northwest of Mount Jumper.

The glacier is named after the Bulgarian woman rebel leader Rumyana Voyvoda (19th century).

== Location ==
Rumyana Glacier is centred at 78°16′00″S 85°50′00″W. US mapping in 1961, updated in 1988.

== See also ==
- List of glaciers in the Antarctic
- Glaciology

== Maps ==
- Vinson Massif. Scale 1:250 000 topographic map. Reston, Virginia: US Geological Survey, 1988.
- Antarctic Digital Database (ADD). Scale 1:250000 topographic map of Antarctica. Scientific Committee on Antarctic Research (SCAR). Since 1993, regularly updated.
