= Evans Peak =

Mountain in Antarctica

Location of Sentinel Range in Western Antarctica.

Sentinel Range map.

Evans Peak (78°17′S 85°58′W) is a prominent rock peak, 3,950 metres (12,960 ft) high, standing 3 nautical miles (6 km) east-northeast of Mount Ostenso in the Sentinel Range of the Ellsworth Mountains, Antarctica. It overlooks Rumyana Glacier to the north and Patton Glacier to the south. The peak was named by the University of Minnesota Geological Party to these mountains, 1963–64, for John Evans, a geologist with the party.

== See also ==
- Mountains in Antarctica

== Maps ==
- Vinson Massif. Scale 1:250 000 topographic map. Reston, Virginia: US Geological Survey, 1988.
- Antarctic Digital Database (ADD). Scale 1:250000 topographic map of Antarctica. Scientific Committee on Antarctic Research (SCAR). Since 1993, regularly updated.
