= The Nose (El Capitan) =

Multi-pitch climbing route in Yosemite, US

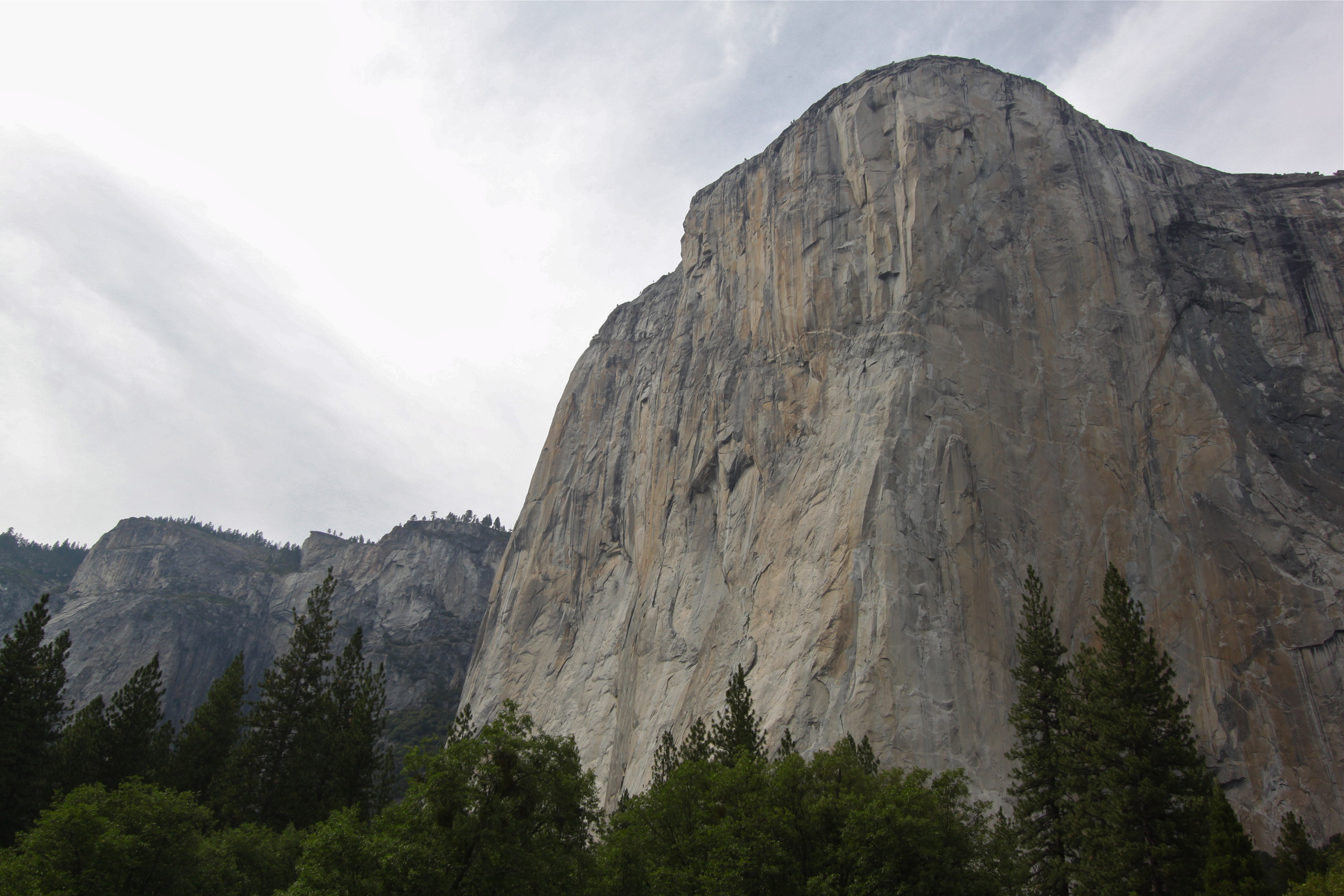
- The Nose on El Capitan
- Location: California, United States
- Coordinates: 37.7286°N 119.6369°W
- Climbing area: Yosemite Valley
- Route type: Big wall climbing; Aid climbing; Traditional climbing
- Rock type: Granite
- Vertical gain: 2,900 ft (880 m)
- Pitches: 31
- Technical grade: 5.14a (8b+) (full free climb); 5.9 (5c) C2 (use of aid)
- NCCS grade: VI
- First ascent: Warren Harding, Wayne Merry, George Whitmore; 1958 (47 days).
- First free ascent: Lynn Hill, 1993 (also the FFFA)
- Fastest ascent: Using aid: 1:58:07, Tommy Caldwell and Alex Honnold; Free climbed: 9:30:00, Connor Herson
- Known for: Second-ever multi-pitch 5.14a (8b+) in history; First-ever multi-pitch female 5.14a (8b+) in history

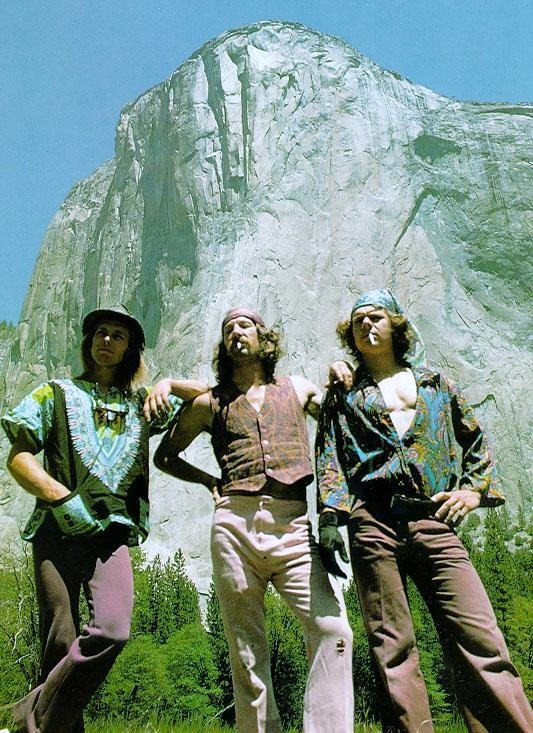
Billy Westbay, Jim Bridwell, and John Long after the first one-day ascent of the Nose in 1975 that used aid climbing techniques (e.g., not full free climbing)

The Nose is a big wall climbing route up El Capitan. Once considered impossible to climb, El Capitan is now the standard for big wall climbing. It is recognized in the historic climbing text Fifty Classic Climbs of North America and considered a classic around the world.

El Capitan has two main faces, the Southwest (on the left when looking directly at the wall) and the Southeast. Between the two faces juts a massive prow. While today there are numerous established routes on both faces, the most popular and historically famous route is The Nose, which follows the massive prow.

== First ascents ==
Once thought to be unclimbable, the high granite walls of Yosemite Valley began to see their first attempts and first ascents by using aid climbing, in the 1950s. One of the most coveted routes was the Northwest Face of Half Dome, and among those coveting it was Californian Warren Harding. Harding made an unsuccessful attempt on Half Dome in 1955, and returned for the 1957 season just as Royal Robbins and team were completing the first ascent. "My congratulations," Harding recounted, "were hearty and sincere, but inside, the ambitious dreamer in me was troubled."

Harding turned to an even larger unclimbed face, the 2,900 feet (900 m) prow of El Capitan, at the other end of the valley. With Mark Powell and Bill "Dolt" Feuerer, they began the climb in July 1957. Rather than follow the single-push "alpine" style used on Half Dome, they were forced, given the technology of the day, to fix lines between "camps" in the style used in the Himalaya. Attempting to get half way on the first push, they were foiled by the large, 2-3" cracks, and Feuerer was required to form new rock spikes or pitons by cutting off the legs of wood stoves. This gave the name to the crack system leading to the halfway point, the "stove leg cracks".

Compelled by the National Park Service to stop until March, due to the crowds forming in El Capitan meadows, they complied. As soon as the snow melted, the team had a major setback when Powell suffered a compound leg fracture on another climbing trip. Powell dropped out, and Feuerer became disillusioned. Harding, true to his legendary endurance and willingness to find new partners, "continued", as he later put it, "with whatever 'qualified' climbers I could con into this rather unpromising venture." Feuerer stayed on as technical advisor, even constructing a bicycle wheeled cart which could be hauled up to the half-way ledge which bears his name today, "Dolt Tower"; but Wayne Merry, George Whitmore, and Rich Calderwood now became the main team, with Merry sharing lead chores with Harding.

In the fall, two more pushes got them to the 2,000 feet (600 m) level. Finally, a fourth push starting in the late fall would likely be the last of the year. The team had originally fixed their route with 1/2 inch (13 mm) manila lines, and their in situ lines would have weakened dangerously over the winter. In the cooling November environment, they worked their way slowly upward, with the seven days it took to push to within the last 300 feet (100 m) blurring into a "monotonous grind" if, Harding adds, "living and working 2,500 feet (800 m) above the ground on a granite face" could be considered monotonous. After sitting out a storm for three days at this level, they hammered their way up the final portion. Harding struggled fifteen hours through the night, hand-placing 28 expansion bolts up an overhanging headwall before topping out at 6 AM. The complete climb had taken 45 days, with more than 3,400 feet (1,000 m) of climbing including huge pendulum swings across the face, the labor of hauling bags, and rappel descents.

The team had finished what is, by any standard, one of the classics of modern rock climbing. The Nose Route is often called the most famous rock climbing route in North America, and in good fall weather can have anywhere between three and ten different parties strung out along its thirty rope lengths to the top. On the 50th anniversary of the ascent, the US House of Representatives passed a resolution honoring the achievement of the original party.

The second ascent was made in 1960 by Royal Robbins, Joe Fitschen, Chuck Pratt and Tom Frost, who, even with 125 bolts already in place, took seven days in the first continuous climb of the route without siege tactics. Climbing The Nose in one day is called NIAD (Nose in a day) in climbing jargon, while climbing The Nose solo is called SNIAD (Solo Nose in a day). The first rope-solo climb of The Nose was made by Tom Bauman in 1969. The first ascent of The Nose in one day was accomplished in 1975 by Stonemasters members John Long, Jim Bridwell and Billy Westbay. The first free ascent was in 1993 by Lynn Hill, who one year later completed the first free ascent in under 24 hours. In August 2016, Miranda Oakley became the first woman to rope solo the route in less than 24 hours. Today The Nose attracts climbers of a wide range of experience and ability. With a success rate of around 60%, it typically takes fit climbers two to three full days of climbing to complete.

== Free climbing ==
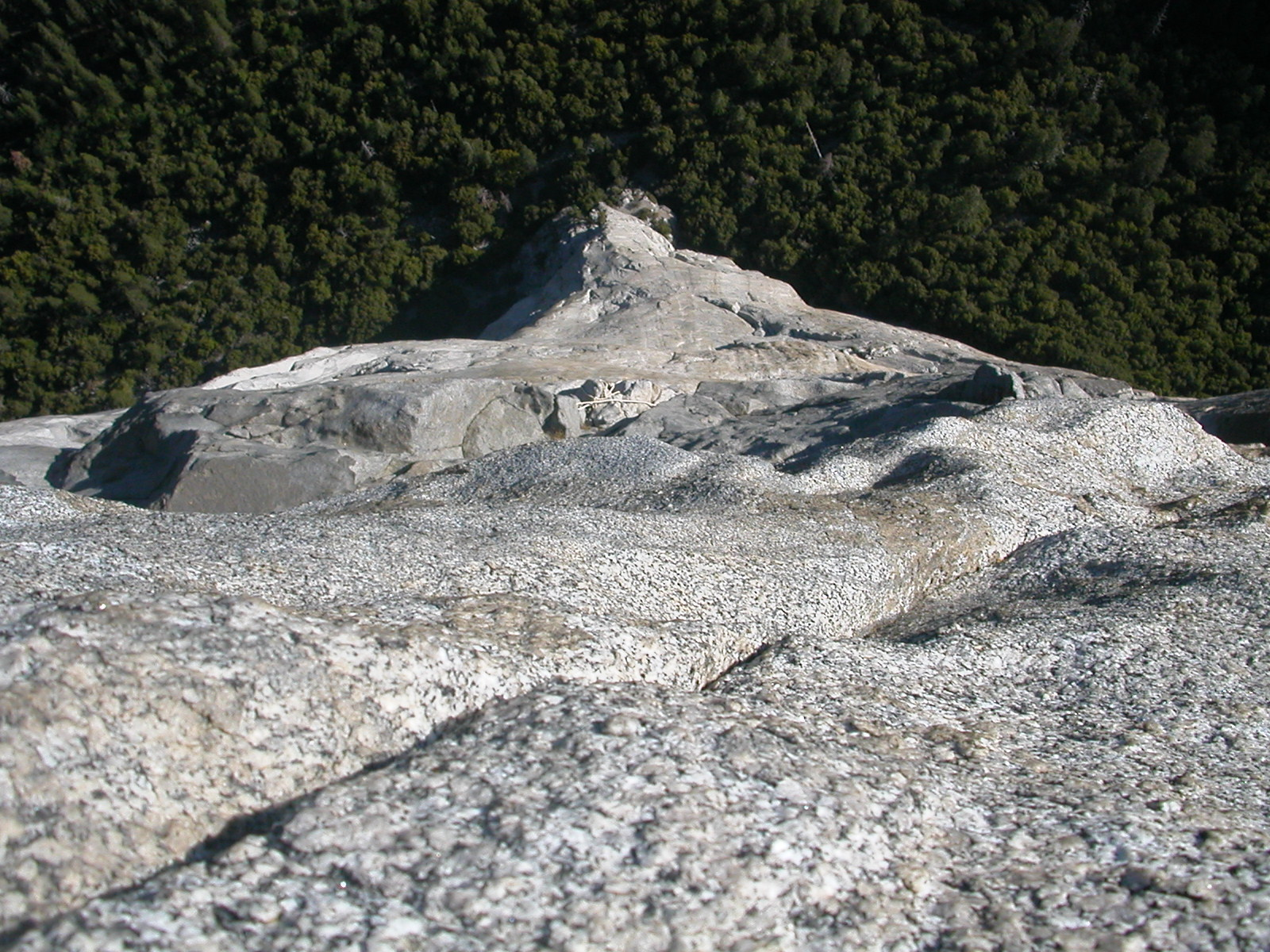
View down the face of El Capitan from the belay stance at the top of pitch 20 (also known as Camp IV). The vertical drop from this point to the valley floor is about 2,000 feet (610 m).

As it became clear that any face could be aid climbed with sufficient perseverance and bolt-hole drilling, some climbers began searching for routes on El Capitan that could be free climbed without aid. The "West Face" route was free climbed in 1979 by Ray Jardine and Bill Price, but despite numerous efforts by Jardine and others, The Nose resisted free attempts for another fourteen years.

The first free ascent of a major El Cap route, though, was not The Nose, but the Salathe Wall. Todd Skinner and Paul Piana free climbed the route over 9 days in 1988, after 30 days of working the route (graded 5.13+ by the Yosemite Decimal System).

=== The Nose ===
Jim Bridwell and Jim Stanton climbed the four Stoveleg Crack pitches (5.10c) free in 1968. Other pitches of 5.10 had been done free in the 60s. In 1975, Ron Kauk, John Bachar and Dale Bard climbed 85% of the route free at 5.11+. In 1980 Jardine launched an all-out siege to free climb the route. Starting at the bottom and using dozens of fixed ropes to jumar to his high point, he was able to free all the moves up to Camp Four (21 pitches) at 5.11d. However, in obvious violation of free climbing convention, he chiseled several hand and footholds to enable a "free" ascent on three distinct, blank pitches. After much negative feedback, Jardine pulled his ropes and discontinued his attempts. All other climbers at the time felt (as they would today) that in order to totally free climb the Nose, a climber would not only have to free climb the four remaining aid pitches near the top, but also find free variations around the chiseled sections, which has not yet been done. In 1991 Brooke Sandahl bolted and then redpointed a variation to the final pitch bolt ladder of the route at 5.12c. The next year, he led the pitch above Camp Five free at 5.12d and also placed bolts to protect the Changing Corners pitch.

Two pitches blocked efforts to free the upper route: the "Great Roof" (now graded 5.13c) and "Changing Corners" (now graded 5.14a/b). In 1993, after seven days of work, Lynn Hill came close to freeing The Nose, making it past the Great Roof and up to Camp VI without falling, stopped only on Changing Corners by a piton jammed in a critical finger hold. After removing the piton she re-climbed the route from the ground. After four days of climbing, Hill reached the summit, making her the first person to free climb The Nose. A year later, Hill returned to free climb The Nose in a day, this time reaching the summit in just 23 hours and setting a new standard for free climbing on "El Cap."

In 1998 Scott Burke summited after 261 days of mostly free climbing effort, leading all but the Great Roof, which was top-roped. On October 14, 2005, Tommy Caldwell and Beth Rodden became the third and fourth people (and the first couple) to free climb The Nose. The husband-wife team took four days on the ascent, swapping leads with each climber free climbing each pitch, either leading or following. Two days later, Caldwell returned to free climb The Nose in less than 12 hours. Caldwell returned two weeks later to free climb El Cap twice in a day, completing The Nose with Rodden, then descending and leading Freerider in a combined time of 23 hours 23 minutes.

==== Full free ascents of The Nose ====
Year	Party	Time	Notes
1993	Lynn Hill	4 days	Free climb
1994	Lynn Hill	23 hours	Free climb
2005	Beth Rodden, Tommy Caldwell	4 days	Free climb where each partner led half the climb
2005	Tommy Caldwell	under 12 hours	Free climb
2005	Tommy Caldwell	11 hours	Free climb
2014	Jorg Verhoeven	3 days	Free climb
2018	Keita Kurakami	5 days	First all-free Rope solo
2018	Connor Herson	3 days	Youngest person to free climb the route
2019	Sébastien Berthe	8 days	Free climb, climbed the full route 'bottom up' (no pre-inspection)
2019	Babsi Zangerl, Jacopo Larcher	6 days	Free climb
2023	Alex Waterhouse, Billy Ridal	7 days	Free climb
2025	Connor Herson	9.5 hours	Fastest free ascent
2025	Will Moss	11h48m	Youngest in-a-day ascent

== Speed climbing ==
Speed climbing The Nose is also popular. Well-trained teams of two produce the fastest times, and there is an unofficial competition to produce the best time. Speed climbing is a mix of aid and free-climbing. Speed records for free-climbing and solo-aid (speed) climbing are also kept, but these fields are less competitive.

As mentioned previously, Lynn Hill's initial all-free one-day ascent was completed in 23 hours (1993), a record that held until Tommy Caldwell free climbed the route in less than 12 hours (2005).

Holders of The Nose speed record (aid and free, two-person teams):

Date	Party	Time (hh:mm:ss)
2018-06-06	Tommy Caldwell, Alex Honnold	1:58:07
2018-06-04	Tommy Caldwell, Alex Honnold	2:01:50
2018-05-30	Tommy Caldwell, Alex Honnold	2:10:15
2017-10-21	Jim Reynolds, Brad Gobright	2:19:44
2012-06-17	Hans Florine, Alex Honnold	2:23:46
2010-11-06	Dean Potter, Sean Leary	2:36:45
2008-10-12	Hans Florine, Yuji Hirayama	2:37:05
2008-07-02	Hans Florine, Yuji Hirayama	2:43:33
2007-10-08	Alexander and Thomas Huber	2:45:45
2007-10-04	Alexander and Thomas Huber	2:48:30
2002-09-29	Hans Florine, Yuji Hirayama	2:48:55
2001-11	Dean Potter, Timmy O'Neill	3:24:20
2001-10	Hans Florine, Jim Herson	3:57:27
2001-10	Dean Potter, Timmy O'Neill	3:59:35
1992	Hans Florine, Peter Croft	4:22:00
1991	Peter Croft, Dave Schultz	4:48:00
1991	Hans Florine, Kevin Thaw	6:01:00
1990	Peter Croft, Dave Schultz	6:40:00
1990	Hans Florine, Steve Schneider	8:06:00
1986	John Bachar, Peter Croft	10:05:00
1984	Duncan Critchley, Romain Vogler	09:30:00 (approximate)
1975	Jim Bridwell, John Long, Billy Westbay	17:45:00

A full list of records can be viewed online.

== Significant features ==
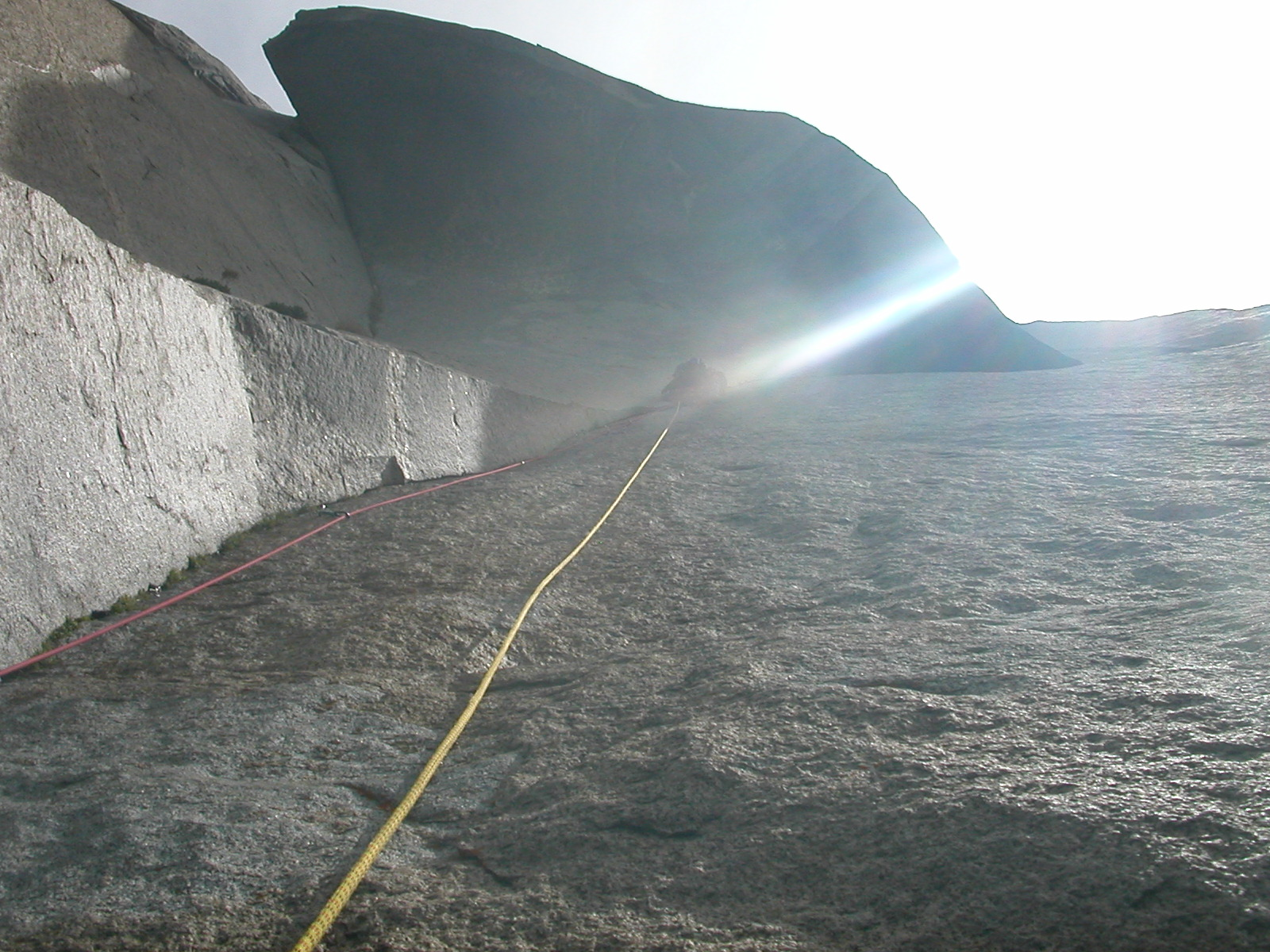
Great Roof as seen from the standard belay stance. With a climber at the end of the lens flare.

The pitch number below is approximate since there are alternative belay stations and the possibility of linking some pitches.

=== The Stovelegs ===
The Stovelegs, pitches 8, 9, 10, and 11, are hand and fist sized cracks, which were originally aid climbed by using pitons made from metal legs of wood burning stoves.

=== King Swing ===
The King Swing is part of pitch 17 and involves a rather large, swinging traverse (aka pendulum).

=== The Great Roof ===
The Great Roof located on pitch 22, rated A1 or 5.13c, was expected to be the technical crux of free climbing the route, but was superseded by Changing Corners.

=== Changing Corners ===
Changing Corners on pitch 27, rated 5.14a/b, is usually considered to be the technical crux when free climbing The Nose.

== See also ==
- El Capitan, 1978 film
- List of geographical noses
