= Miranda Oakley =

American rock climber (born 1984)

- Born: Miranda Negla Oakley; June 1, 1984 (age 42)
- Education: St. Mary's College of Maryland
- Occupation: Rock climber
- Known for: Co-founding 'Climbers with Palestine'
- Website: https://www.mirandaoakley.com/

Miranda Negla Oakley (born June 1, 1984) is an American rock climber and the first woman to rope-solo the big wall climbing route known as The Nose on El Capitan, in a single day. She has also been involved as an activist and is the co-founder of 'Climbers with Palestine'.

== Early career and education ==
Miranda Oakley grew up in Kensington, Maryland. Her parents were a Palestinian immigrant and an American music teacher, both peace activists. Her mother took her to meetings of a Palestinian aid organization from an early age. She attended a Quaker-run middle school. In 1999, she and her younger brother were taken rock climbing in Rockville, and she soon joined the climbing club and the competition climbing team. She learned to boulder and top-rope, reaching a difficulty level of 5.10 (1).

When she moved away from home to attend St. Mary's College of Maryland she began free climbing and made trips to local crags. Later, she founded a school-accredited climbing course and began teaching others how to climb. In 2005, she studied European politics for six months in Granada, Spain, where she also further developed her climbing skills. In 2006, she received a Bachelor of Arts in international studies from St. Mary's College.

== Climbing career ==
After graduating, Oakley began working as a dishwasher at a hostel near Yosemite National Park to focus on big wall climbing. Later, she became a climbing instructor at Yosemite National Park. In 2008, she and a colleague climbed the Incredible Hulk in the Sierra Nevada via the 12-pitch Red Dihedral route. That same year, she climbed the 16-pitch Royal Arches Route in a group of five climbers. In 2021, she led climbing groups on the Royal Arches Route. In 2013, she traveled to El Chaltén, Argentina, where she and other climbers made the first ascent of the 400-meter-long big-wall route, Wormhole Theory, on the Aguja de l'S.

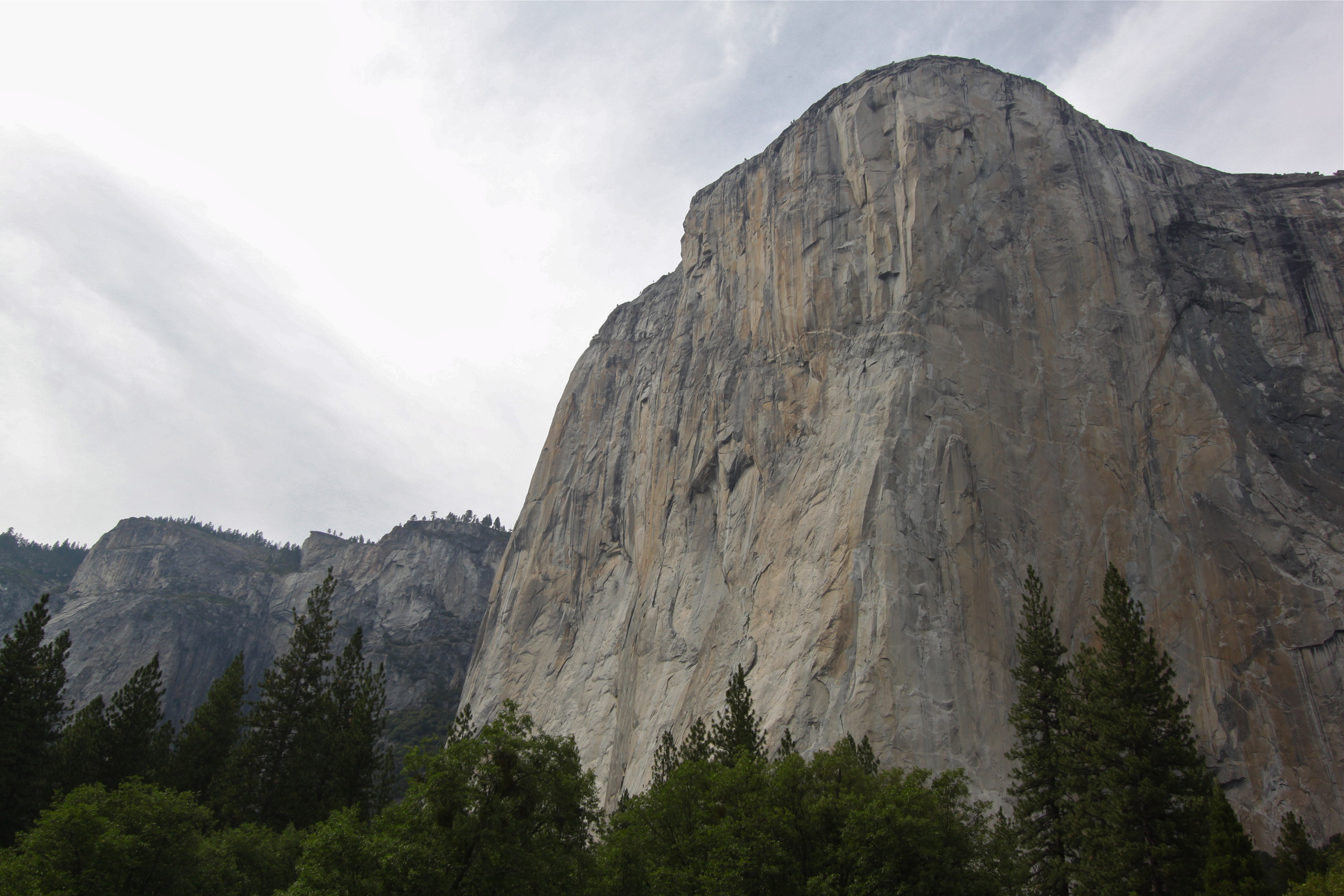
The Nose in Yosemite

She has climbed El Capitan via several routes. She has climbed The Nose route more than ten times, mostly with other climbing partners. In 2015, she made her first rope solo ascent of The Nose, which she did in 26 hours. In 2016, she rope-soloed The Nose route in just 22 hours, becoming the first-ever woman to rope-solo the summit in less than 24 hours.

=== Activism ===
In 2017, Oakley traveled to Ramallah in the West Bank, for the first time, to climb after learning that two colleagues were establishing a climbing community there. In March 2024, Oakley, along with a Jewish climber, founded 'Climbers with Palestine', which planted a Palestinian flag in Joshua Tree National Park, and a 'Stop the Genocide' banner on El Capitan in the Yosemite National Park in June.

== See also ==
- Babsi Zangerl, Austrian female big-wall climber
- Lynn Hill, American female big-wall climber
