= El Capitan (film) =

- Directed by: Fred Padula
- Produced by: Fred Padula
- Starring: Gary Colliver; Richard McCracken; Lito Tejada-Flores
- Release date: 1978
- Running time: 60 minutes
- Country: United States
- Language: English

El Capitan is a 1978 film by filmmaker Fred Padula that captures one of the earliest ascents of The Nose on El Capitan in Yosemite Valley, California. It has won several awards at film festivals around the world.

== Plot ==
The film follows three climbers as they do the 3000-feet (900 m) vertical ascent of The Nose, the classic first big-wall climb on El Capitan. A fourth climber follows the group and films their ascent but is never seen in the movie. The climbers need three days to reach the summit, which means they have to spend two nights sleeping on steep ledges, waking to magnificent views. Several minutes of the film are filmed in the pitch black when the climbers are caught by nightfall before reaching a ledge to spend the night. The screen is dark when one climber is heard trying to belay another when a bolt breaks loose and the climbers fall, luckily unharmed.

== Climbers ==
- Gary Colliver
- Richard McCracken
- Lito Tejada-Flores
- Glen Denny (Filming)

== Climbing techniques ==
The climbers use accepted climbing practices and state-of-the-art techniques appropriate to their climbing era. For example, they wear tubular nylon webbing "swami belts" around their bodies and tie the rope into them rather than harnesses clipped to the rope with carabiners. Also, though they use familiar hex nuts they can also been seen hammering pitons into cracks for protection.

== Production ==
Filming in 16mm format started on the wall 20 May 1968 and lasted through June, with additional scenes shot in the Fall and Spring 1969. The project was initially funded with the help of The North Face founder Doug Tompkins, who brought in his friend Peter J. Avenali, as well as by climber Glen Denny and the filmmaker. Subsequent funding came from the American Film Institute. The completed film eventually premiered at the San Francisco Museum of Modern Art in 1978. An early version of a digital remaster of the film was shown at the Banff Mountain Film Festival in 2007 In early 2013, the filmmaker finished a Kickstarter-funded digital restoration and re-issue on Blu-ray and DVD. The DVD and Blu-ray are being distributed by Western Eye Press, a company owned by Lito Tejada-Flores, one of the climbers featured in the film.

== Awards ==
The film has received awards at the following film festivals:

- La Plagne
- Trento
- Les Diablerets
- Munich
- Banff
- Telluride film festival
