= Jim Bridwell =

American big wall rock climber and mountaineer (1944–2018)

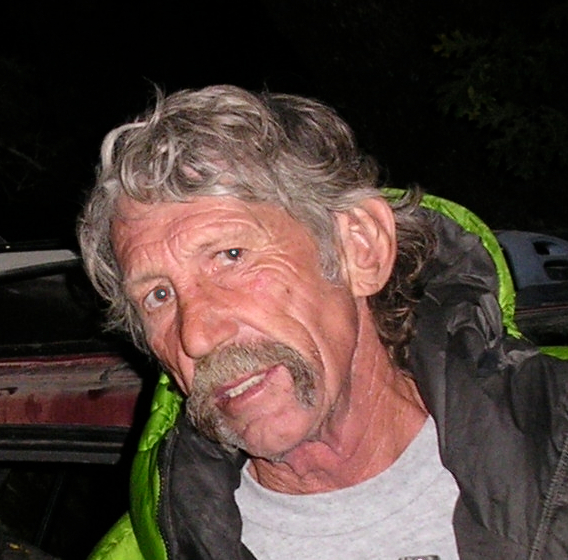
- Bridwell in 2003

Personal information
- Born: July 29, 1944 San Antonio, Texas
- Died: February 16, 2018 (aged 73) Palm Springs, California, U.S.

Climbing career
- Type of climber: Big wall climbing; Aid climbing; Alpine climbing; Traditional climbing; Rescue climbing
- First ascents: Pacific Ocean Wall (VI 5.9 A4, 1975); Sea of Dreams (VI 5.9 A5, 1978); Zenyatta Mondatta (VI 5.9 A5, 1981)
- Known for: One-day ascent of The Nose (5.8 C2, 1975); One of the first to climb at grade A5 at Yosemite; Inventor of copperhead and beak

Jim Bridwell (July 29, 1944 – February 16, 2018) was an American rock climber and mountaineer, active from 1965 in Yosemite Valley, but later in Patagonia and Alaska. He was noted for pushing the standards of both aid climbing and big wall climbing, and later alpine climbing. He wrote numerous articles on climbing and developed several important pieces of aid climbing equipment. Bridwell was an apprentice to Royal Robbins and Warren Harding, and later the unofficial leader of the Stonemasters.

== Climbing career ==
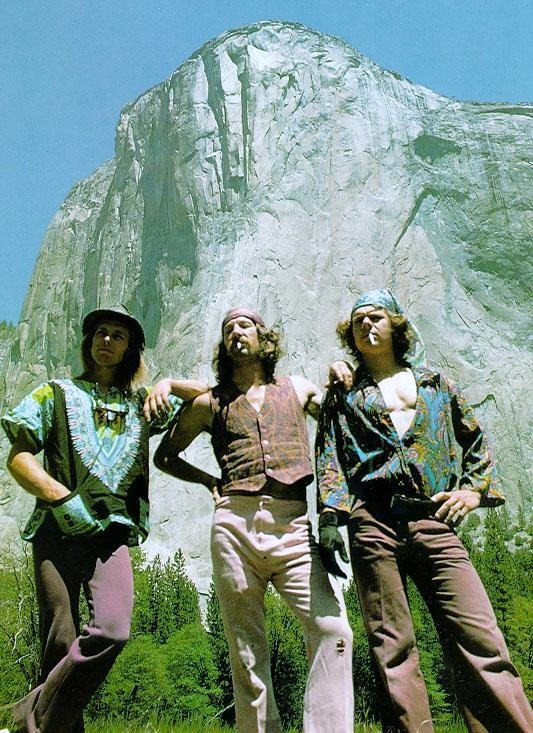
Billy Westbay, Jim Bridwell (center), and John Long after the first one-day ascent of the Nose in 1975

Bridwell is credited with over 100 first ascents (FA) in Yosemite Valley, in addition to conducting the first one-day ascent of The Nose on El Capitan on May 26, 1975, with John Long and Billy Westbay. He founded Yosemite National Park's Search and Rescue Team (YOSAR), spearheading many rescues. He was a leading force in the evolving techniques of aid climbing and an innovator and inventor of widely used and copied aid climbing equipment, including copperheads and bird-beaks.

== Personal life ==
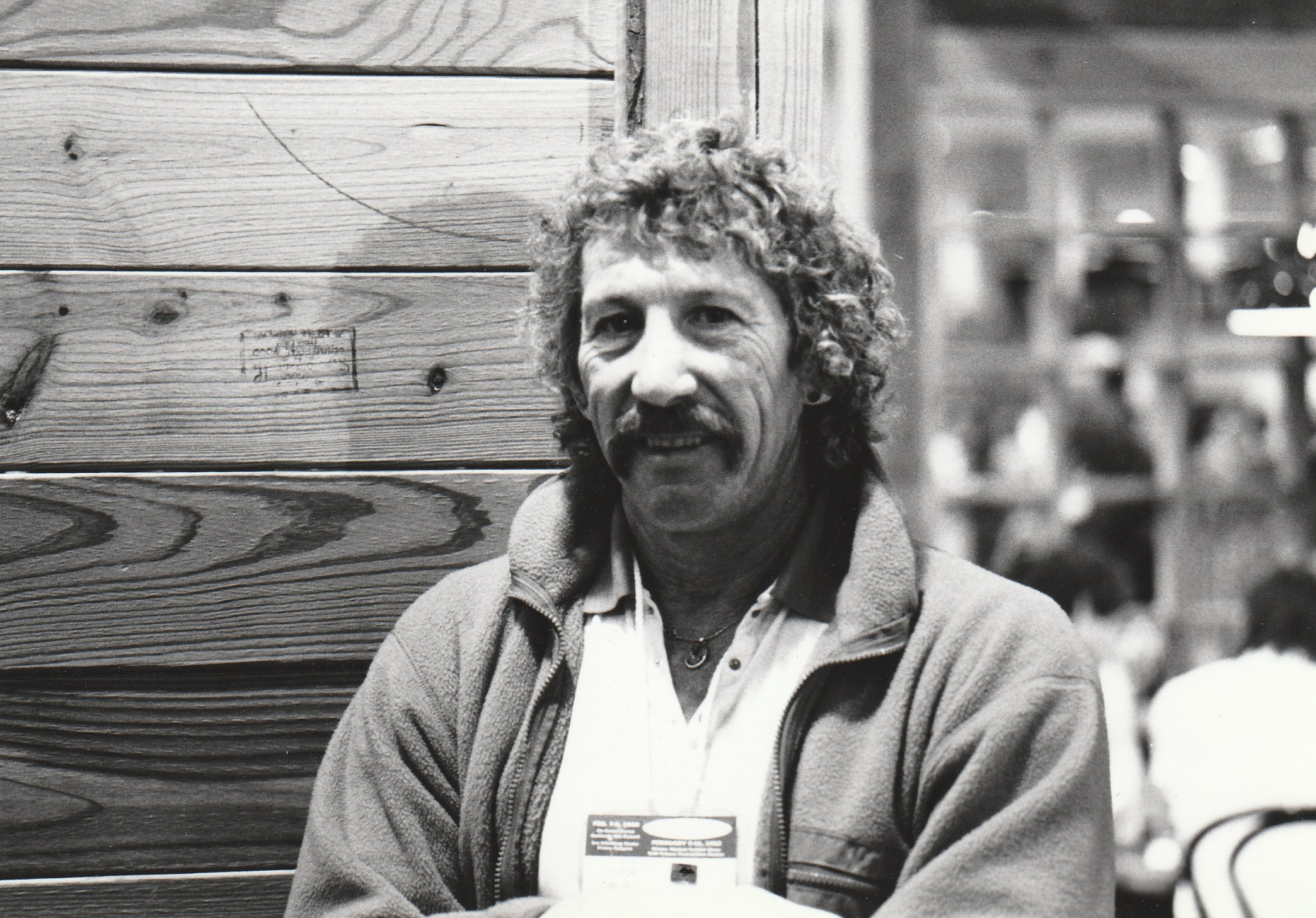
Jim Bridwell in Salt Lake City, circa 1990

Bridwell resided in Palm Desert, California, until his death on February 16, 2018, from complications of hepatitis C He had contracted the disease while receiving a tattoo in Borneo during the 1980s.

== Notable ascents ==
- 1965 Entrance Exam (II 5.9), Arch Rock, Yosemite, California with Chuck Pratt, Chris Fredericks and Larry Marshik
- 1966 Braille Book (III 5.8), Higher Cathedral Rock, Yosemite, California, with Chris Fredericks, Joe Faint and Brian Berry.
- 1967 East Face (VI 5.9 A4), Higher Cathedral Rock, Yosemite, California, with Chris Fredericks
- 1967 South Central (V 5.10a A2), Washington Column, Yosemite, California, with Joe Faint
- 1969 Triple Direct (VI 5.9 A2), El Capitan, Yosemite, California, with Kim Schmitz
- 1971 Aquarian Wall (VI 5.9 A4), El Capitan, Yosemite, California, with Kim Schmitz
- 1971 New Dimensions (5.11 A1), Arch Rock, Yosemite, California, with Mark Klemens
- 1971 Nabisco Wall, The Cookie, Yosemite, California,
- 1970 Vain Hope (V 5.7 A3), Ribbon Falls, Yosemite, California with Royal Robbins and Kim Schmitz
- 1973 Central Pillar of Frenzy, Middle Cathedral Rock, Yosemite, California, with Roger Breedlove and Ed Barry
- 1974 Freestone, Geek Towers, Yosemite Falls, Yosemite, California
- 1975 Wailing Wall, Tuolumne Meadows, California with Dale Bard and Rick Accomozo
- 1975 The Nose (5.13+ or 5.8 C2), El Capitan, Yosemite, California, with Billy Westbay, and John Long, first one-day ascent in 17:45
- 1975 Pacific Ocean Wall (VI 5.9 A4), El Capitan, Yosemite, California, with Bill Westbay, Jay Fiske and Fred East
- 1976 Gold Ribbon (VI 5.10 A3), Ribbon Falls, Yosemite, California with Mike Graham
- 1977 Bushido (VI 5.10 A4), Half Dome, Yosemite, California with Dale Bard
- 1978 Sea of Dreams (VI 5.9 A5), El Capitan, Yosemite, California with Dale Bard and Dave Diegelman
- 1978 Zenith (VI 5.9 A4), Half Dome, Yosemite, California with Kim Schmitz
- 1979 Southeast Ridge of Cerro Torre, Patagonia, Argentina with Steven Brewer (first alpine-style ascent of the peak)
- 1979 Northwest Face, "The Ship Prow" Kichatna Spire, Alaska Range with Andy Embick
- 1981 Zenyatta Mondatta (VI 5.9 A5), El Capitan, Yosemite, California with Peter Mayfield and Charlie Row
- 1981 Dance of the Woo Li Masters, East Face of The Moose's Tooth, Ruth Gorge, Alaska (VI 5.9 WI4+ A4, 1520m) with Mugs Stump
- 1982 South Face, "Sapphire Bullets of Pure Love" Pumori, Nepal with Jan Reynolds and Ned Gillette
- 1987 The Big Chill, Half Dome, Yosemite, California with Peter Mayfield, Sean Plunkett and Steve Bosque
- 1989 Shadows (VI 5.10 A5), Half Dome, Yosemite, California with Charles Row, Cito Kirkpatrick, William Westbay
- 1991 North Face (repeat) The Eiger, Bernese Alps, Switzerland
- 1997 Wyoming Sheep Ranch (VI 5.9 A5), (repeat) El Capitan, Yosemite, California with Giovanni Groaz
- 1998 Heavy Metal and Tinker Toys (VI 5.9 A5), El Capitan, Yosemite, California with Boulos Ayad and Tyson Hausoeffer
- 1998 Plastic Surgery Disaster (VI 5.8 A5), (repeat) El Capitan, Yosemite, California with Mark Bowling and Giovanni Groaz
- 1999 The Useless Emotion (VII 5.9 WI4 A4), The Bear's Tooth, Ruth Glacier, Alaska with Terry Christensen, Glenn Dunmire, Brian Jonas and Brian McCray May 3–21, 1999
- 1999 Odyssey, Grand Capucin(VI 5.9 A5), Mont Blanc (French Alps), with Giovanni Groaz
- 1999 Dark Star (VI 5.10 A5), El Capitan, Yosemite, California with Giovanni Groaz
- 2001 The Beast Pillar, (V11 5.10b WI4+ A5) The Moose's Tooth, Buckskin Glacier, Alaska with Spencer Pfinsten
- 2001 Welcome to Afghanistan (VI 5.9 A4), El Capitan, Yosemite, California with Giovanni Groaz
- 2002 Pointless Connection (VI 5.9 A4+), Yosemite Pointless, Yosemite, California with Giovanni Groaz
- 2004 Old Guides Variation (VI 5.8 A3), El Capitan, Yosemite, California with Jackson Marsten and Giovanni Groaz

== Publications ==
- Bridwell, Jim. "Brave New World". Mountain (1973). United Kingdom: Ken Wilson.
- Bridwell, Jim; Michael Strassman (1990). Climbing Big Walls. Merrillville, IN: ICS Books. ISBN 0934802599.
- Bridwell, Jim; Dougald MacDonald (1999). Largo's Apprenticeship in The Best of Rock & Ice: An Anthology. Seattle WA: The Mountaineers Books. pp. 102–105. ISBN 0898866650.
- Bridwell, Jim (1992). Climbing Adventures: A Climber's Passion. ICS Books. ISBN 978-0934802222.
- Bridwell, Jim (2000). "The Bear's Tooth: Teaching the new dogs old tricks". American Alpine Journal. 42 (74). New York: American Alpine Club: 37–45. ISBN 978-0930410872.
- Bridwell, Jim (November 27, 2006). "Bird's Eye View". Alpinist. 18 (Winter 2006–2007). Jackson Wyoming: Alpinist Magazine.
- Bridwell, Jim (2008). "Giovanni Groaz". The Bird. Translated by Michele Radici. Milan, Italy: Versante Sud s. n. c. p. 303. ISBN 978-8887890761.

== See also ==
- Aid climbing
- Big wall climbing
- History of rock climbing

== Bibliography ==
- Roper, Steve (1971). Climber's Guide to Yosemite Valley. San Francisco: Sierra Club Books. ISBN 978-0871560483.
- Reid, Don (1993). Yosemite Climbs: Big Walls. Evergreen, Colorado: Chockstone Press Press. ISBN 0934641544.
