= Fifi hook =

Type of hook used in climbing

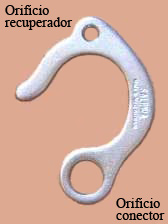
A fifi hook

The fifi hook is a small question mark shaped piece of equipment used principally in aid climbing, to quickly connect a climber to gear to take their weight. It can also be useful for free climbing, alpinism, mixed climbing and ice climbing.

Typically made of stamped steel or forged alloy, it has a large hole at the bottom for connecting to one's harness and a smaller hole at the top for attaching a retrieval cord in case of a fall.

Due to its open shape, it offers very little strength and requires a great deal of caution when used. If a fifi hook is being used as a main rest support, using a backup carabiner is recommended.

== See also ==
- Rock-climbing equipment
