= Aid climbing =

Type of rock climbing

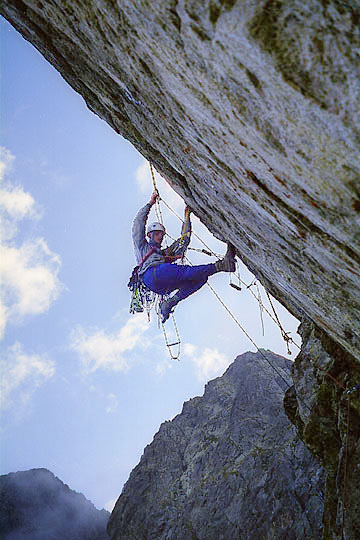
Aid climber using aiders (or ladders) on an overhanging climbing route

Aid climbing is a form of rock climbing that uses mechanical devices and equipment, such as aiders (also called 'ladders'), to assist in generating upward momentum. Aid climbing is contrasted with free climbing (in both its traditional or sport free-climbing formats), which can use mechanical equipment only for climbing protection, not to assist in any upward momentum. Aid climbing can involve hammering in permanent pitons and bolts, into which the aiders are clipped, but there is also 'clean aid climbing', which avoids any hammering and uses only temporary removable placements such as spring-loaded camming devices.

While aid climbing traces its origins to the start of all climbing when ladders and pitons were common, its use in single-pitch climbing waned in the early 20th century with the rise of free climbing. At the same time, the Dolomites saw the start of modern "big wall aid climbing", where pioneers like Emilio Comici developed new tools and techniques. Aid climbing's "golden age" was in the 1960s and 1970s on Yosemite's granite big walls led by pioneers such as Royal Robbins and Warren Harding, and later Jim Bridwell, and was where Robbins' ethos of minimal-aid, and Yvon Chouinard's ethos of clean aid climbing, became dominant.

In the 1990s, the traditional A-grade system for rating aid climbing routes was expanded at Yosemite into a more detailed "new wave" system, and with the development and growth in clean aid climbing, the A-grade system became the C-grade system. The grading of aid-climbing routes is complex as successive repeats of the route can substantially change the nature of the challenge through the continuous hammering and also the build-up of large amounts of in-situ fixed placements from each ascending party. It is not untypical for a new A5-graded aid-climbing route, to migrate to an A3-graded route over time.

Aid climbing is still used on large big wall climbing and alpine climbing routes to overcome sections of extreme difficulty that are beyond the difficulties of the rest of the route. A famous big wall climb such as The Nose on El Capitan is accessible to strong climbers as a partial-aid route graded VI 5.9 (5c) C2, but only a tiny handful can handle its 5.14a (8b+) grade as a free climbed route. Aid is also used to develop "next generation" big wall routes (e.g. Riders on the Storm on Cordillera Paine, or the Grand Voyage on Trango Towers). Extreme C5-graded aid-only routes are also still being established, such as Nightmare on California Street on El Capitan.

== Description ==
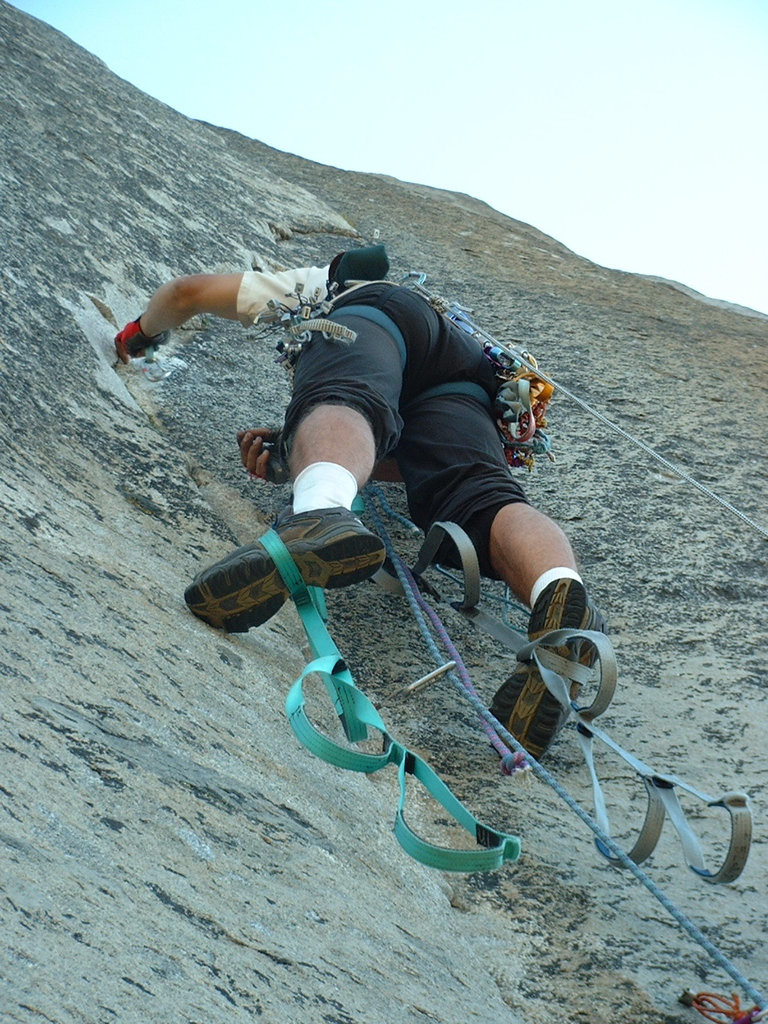
Climber standing in aiders while ascending aid climbing route, The Shield (VI 5.7 A3), on El Capitan

Aid climbing is a form of rock climbing that uses mechanical devices and equipment for upward momentum. Like traditional and sport climbing, aid climbing is typically done in pairs with a lead climber making the "placements" into which ladders (known as aiders) are clipped, thus enabling them to ascend. After the lead climber has reached the top, the second climber (or belayer) then removes the placements as they jumar up the rope.

Traditional aid climbing relied on fixed placements, which were mainly metal pitons that the lead climber hammered into the rock as they ascended. These placements remained permanently fixed on the route (and in such cases, the second (or belayer) didn't have to take any placement out and just jumared up on a fixed rope). Clean aid climbing avoids any hammering and uses the temporary protection of traditional climbing (e.g. spring-loaded camming devices) for placements; these are then removed by the second climber as they make their own ascent. This method therefore avoids the damage of repeated hammering of metal to aid routes, and has been advocated as useful training and building up of experience in the placing of traditional climbing protection.

While the sport of aid climbing has waned as the free climbing movement has grown, elements of aid climbing are still a regular feature of many major big wall climbing and alpine climbing routes. These routes are long multi-pitch climbs where it is possible to find specific sections that are considerably above the difficulty level of the rest of the route. For such sections, aid climbing techniques are accepted even by free climbers. For example, the renowned big wall climbing route The Nose on El Capitan is a 31-pitch 870-metre graded partial clean aid climb at VI 5.9 (5c) C2, but as a fully free climb with no aid, it is graded VI 5.14a (8b+), which is beyond the skills of all but a very small group of elite free climbers.

== History ==
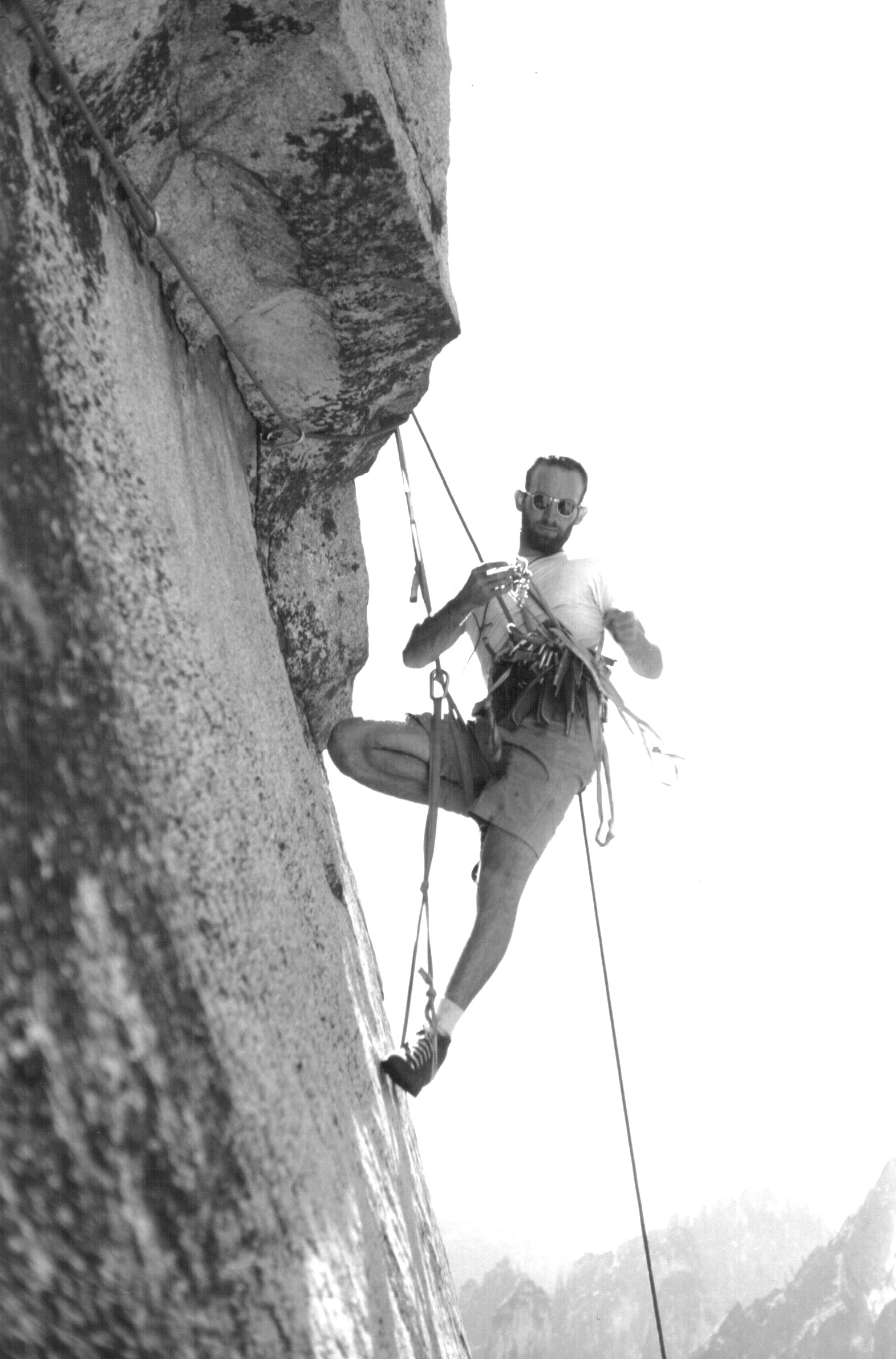
Royal Robbins resting on his aiders during the 3rd pitch of the FA of the Salathé Wall (VI 5.9 C2)

Aid climbing traces its origins to the start of all climbing, with ladders used on historic ascents such as the 1492 ascent of Mont Aiguille, the 1786 ascent of Mont Blanc, or the 1893 ascent of Devils Tower, and with drilled bolts on historic ascents such as the 1875 first ascent of Half Dome. By the start of the 20th century, the widespread use of aid (e.g. ladders and pitons) was challenged by the free climbing movement led by Paul Preuss. While the use of aid diminished on single-pitch routes, big wall climbers in the Dolomites, such as Tita Piaz, further developed aid climbing techniques. The legacy of the Dolomites as the birthplace of big-wall and modern aid climbing was cemented by pioneer Emilio Comici who developed the multi-step aider (or ladder). In 1933, Comici used these aid climbing techniques to climb the overhanging north face of the Cima Grande, then the world's hardest big wall aid route. Comici's aid techniques were used by the leading European big wall and alpine climbers such as Riccardo Cassin on famous routes across the European Alps.

In 1946, John Salathé developed a piton made from high-carbon chrome-vanadium (salvaged from the axles of Ford cars), which enabled him to overcome the hard granite cracks of Yosemite and climb the iconic Lost Arrow Spire in 1947 with Ax Nelson. Salathé's new aid climbing equipment (including the skyhook), led to a "golden age" in big wall aid climbing. In 1957, a team led by Royal Robbins used Salathé's aid tools to climb the Northwest Face of Half Dome in Yosemite, ushering in modern American big wall aid climbing. In 1958, a team led by Warren Harding aid climbed The Nose on El Capitan using siege tactics (600 pitons and 125 bolts) over 47 days; while the ascent got worldwide recognition it was controversial due to the excessive use of aid. Robbins' ethos of minimizing the use of aid prevailed over that of Harding, and his legacy of partially-aided ascents including the Salathé Wall (1961), the North American Wall (1964), and the Muir Wall (1968) cemented Yosemite, and the granite walls of El Capitan, as the world's most important big wall aid climbing venue, and Robbins' place in climbing history.

1970 saw one of the most infamous events in big wall aid climbing with the creation of Cesare Maestri's Compressor Route on Cerro Torre. Maestri drilled an extreme amount of bolts into the famous headwall using a 300-pound air compressor drill; in one section, he drilled across a blank 90-metre face to avoid the wind. Maestri's excessive use of aid was condemned. In 1971, Reinhold Messner wrote a now-famous essay titled The Murder of the Impossible on the trend of excessive aid saying: "Today's climber ... carries his courage in his rucksack". Another famous essay in 1972, by big wall pioneers Yvon Chouinard and Tom Frost, appealed for clean aid climbing techniques to avoid the damage incurred by pitons and hammers. Messner's and Chouinard's essays marked the end of the excessive aid techniques. The 1970s saw new big wall aid climbing pioneers such as Jim Bridwell pushing standards in Yosemite using less intrusive aid (e.g. Chouinard's RURPs) to put up groundbreaking routes such as Pacific Ocean Wall (1975) and Sea of Dreams (1978), with its famous A5-graded "Hook or Book" pitch, the first "if you fall, you die" rope length on El Capitan.

Bridwell and others pushed big wall aid climbing standards into the 1980s and 1990s with ever-harder A5-graded routes like Reticent Wall (1995) on the blank south faces of El Capitan. The arrival sport climbing in the late 1980s saw a dramatic rise in rock climbing standards. Many big wall aid climbs were freed, with the most notable being Lynn Hill's 1993 free climb of The Nose on El Capitan at 5.14a. Aid climbing continued to be a skill set for big wall and alpine climbers in both being able to complete routes that would otherwise be almost impossible to most climbers (e.g. The Nose on El Capitan) and in creating "next generation" big wall and alpine routes that are not capable of being fully freed (e.g. the Grand Voyage on Trango Towers). In a 1999 essay in Ascent titled The Mechanical Advantage, big wall aid climber and author, John Middendorf, said of that Hill's achievement on The Nose: "But without the old piton scars, without fixed protection, without her big-wall aid climbing experience, without the extraordinary free-climbing ability she gained from bolted sport climbs and indoor gyms and competitions, would there have ever been a such a free ascent?"

In 2012, the Oxford English Dictionary added the term "aid climbing".

== Equipment ==
Aid climbing equipment

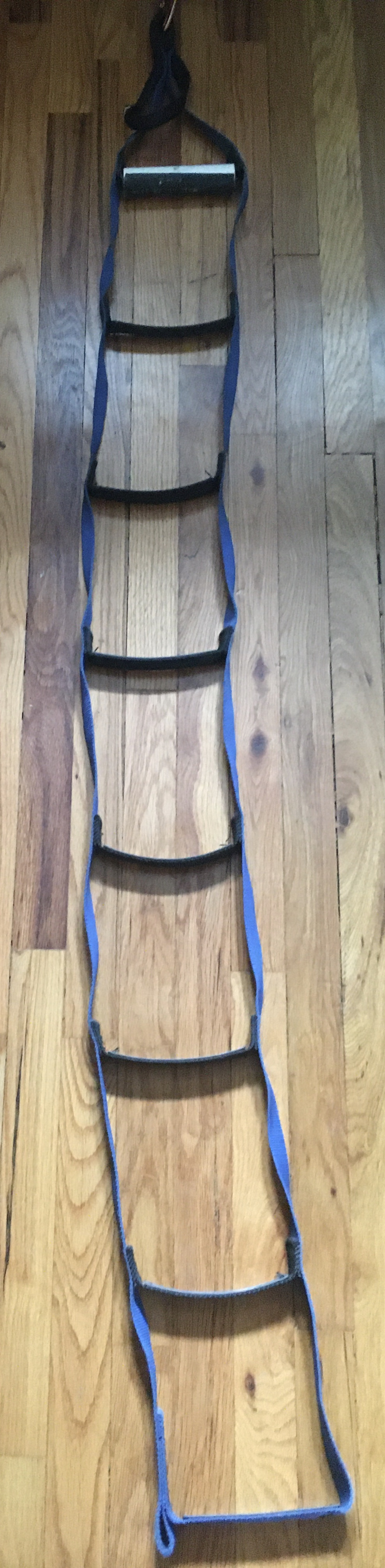
Aider

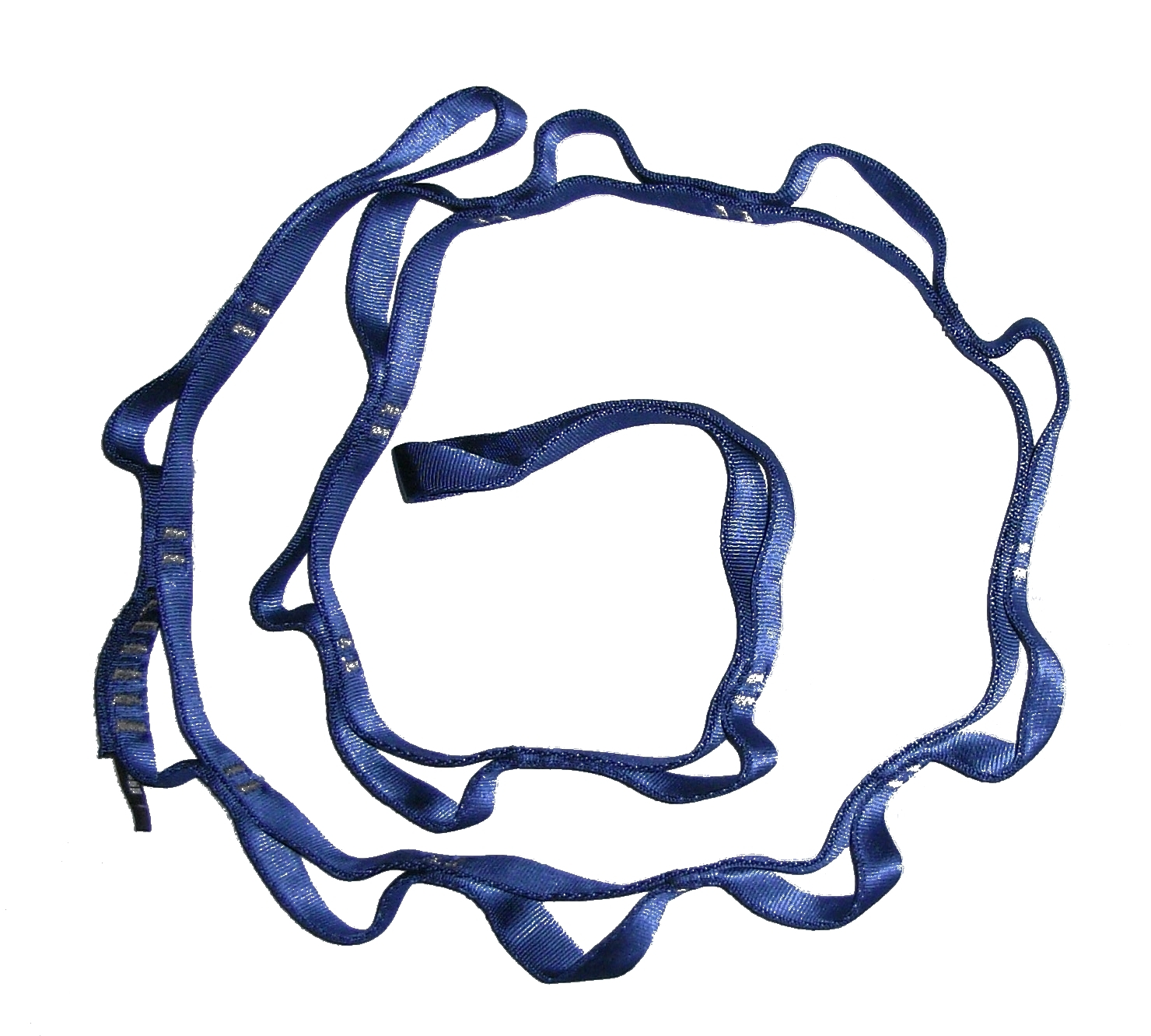
Daisy chain

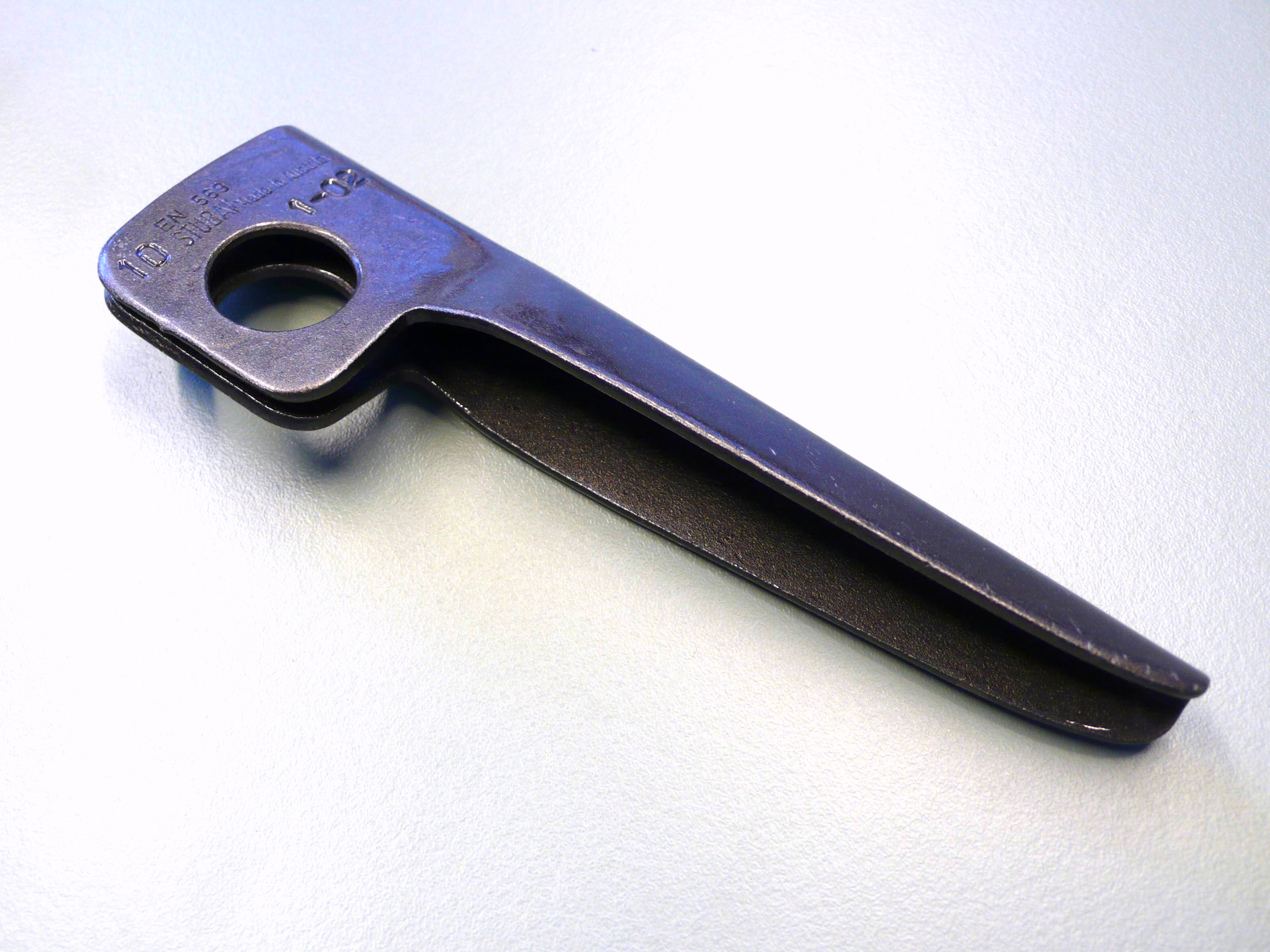
Piton

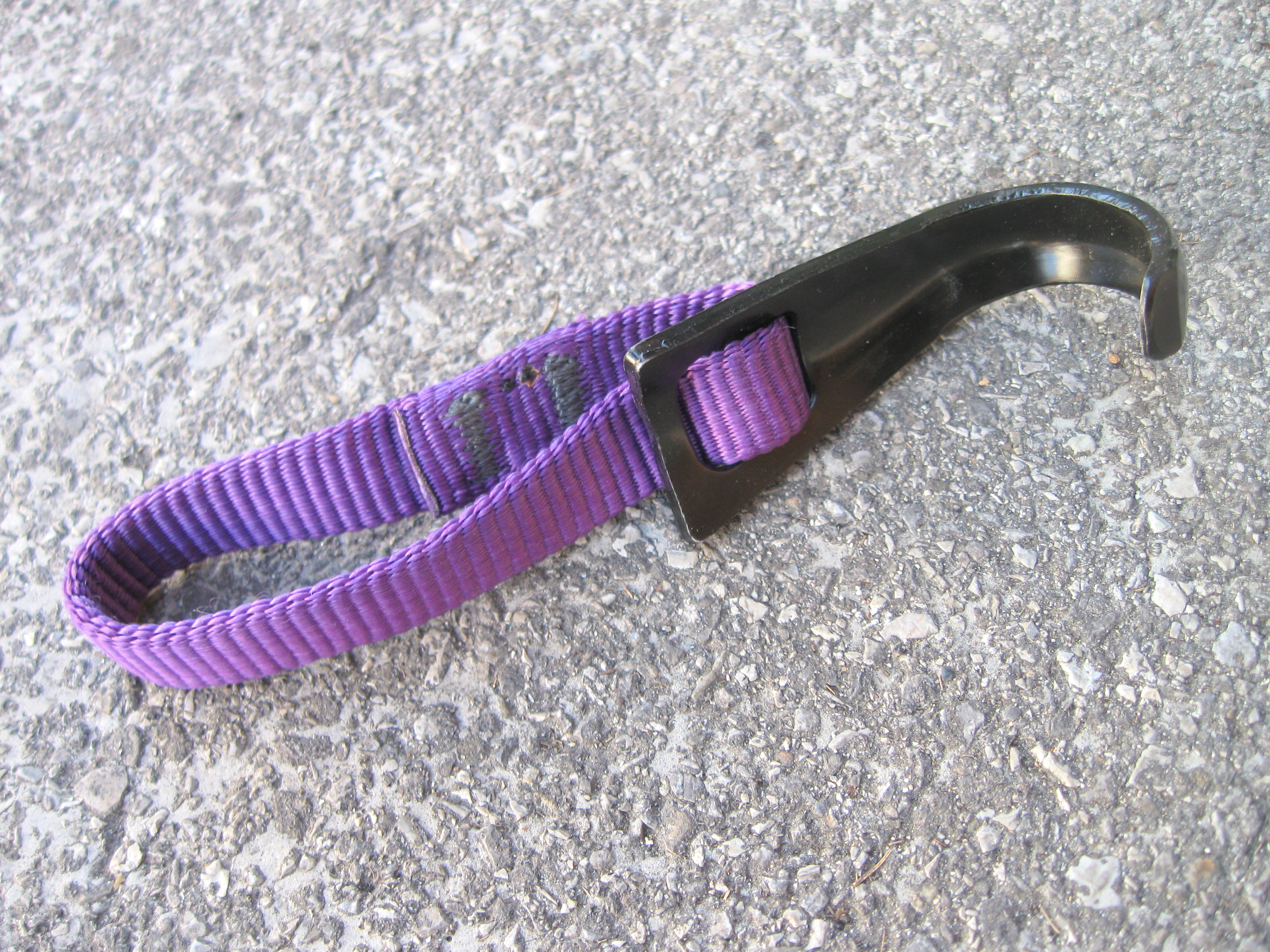
Skyhook

Modern aid climbing typically uses most of the equipment used in traditional climbing and particularly the protection equipment of traditional climbing (e.g. nuts, hexcentrics and tricams, and spring-loaded camming devices) that are needed for clean aid climbing. Where aid climbing is done as part of big wall climbing, which is normally its most common format, even more equipment is required (e.g. including haul bags, hauling pulleys and trail ropes; portaledges, and poop tubes).

A number of unique items of equipment are also used in aid climbing:

=== Fixed placement equipment ===
Before the introduction of clean aid climbing, placements were hammered in by the aid climber as they ascended, with metal pitons hammered into cracks being a common placement (and the various piton types including Lost Arrows, bongs, angles and knifeblades), but also including copperheads (or heads); aid climbers may also use bolt kits to place fixed bolts where there are no suitable cracks for pitons while ascending.

=== Aiders and daisy chain systems ===
The equipment used to ascend via the hammered in placements are dual sets of aiders, which are like ladders made of webbing material, and come in various styles including adjustable strap-aiders, and stirrup-style "etriers". These aiders are attached to the aid climber via a matching dual set of daisy chains (which can be loop-style or adjustable), and the aid climber will use fifi hooks to manage the effective length of the daisy chains.

=== Hooks and hangers ===
Various types of rock climbing use hooks as temporary placements, but they feature most commonly in aid climbing where on more difficult aid-climbing routes (e.g. grades above A2+), the aid climber is expected to be able to use placements that can handle only their static bodyweight but may otherwise fail in the case of a dynamic fall; the range of hook types used in aid climbing includes skyhooks, cam hooks and rivet hangers.

=== Ascenders and fixed rope jumaring equipment ===
Aid climbing, and particularly for the belayer following the lead aid climbing, usually employ fixed rope ascending equipment, with ascenders being the most common devices, to reduce the effort on long big wall aid climbs.

== Techniques ==
Aid climbing techniques on big wall climbs

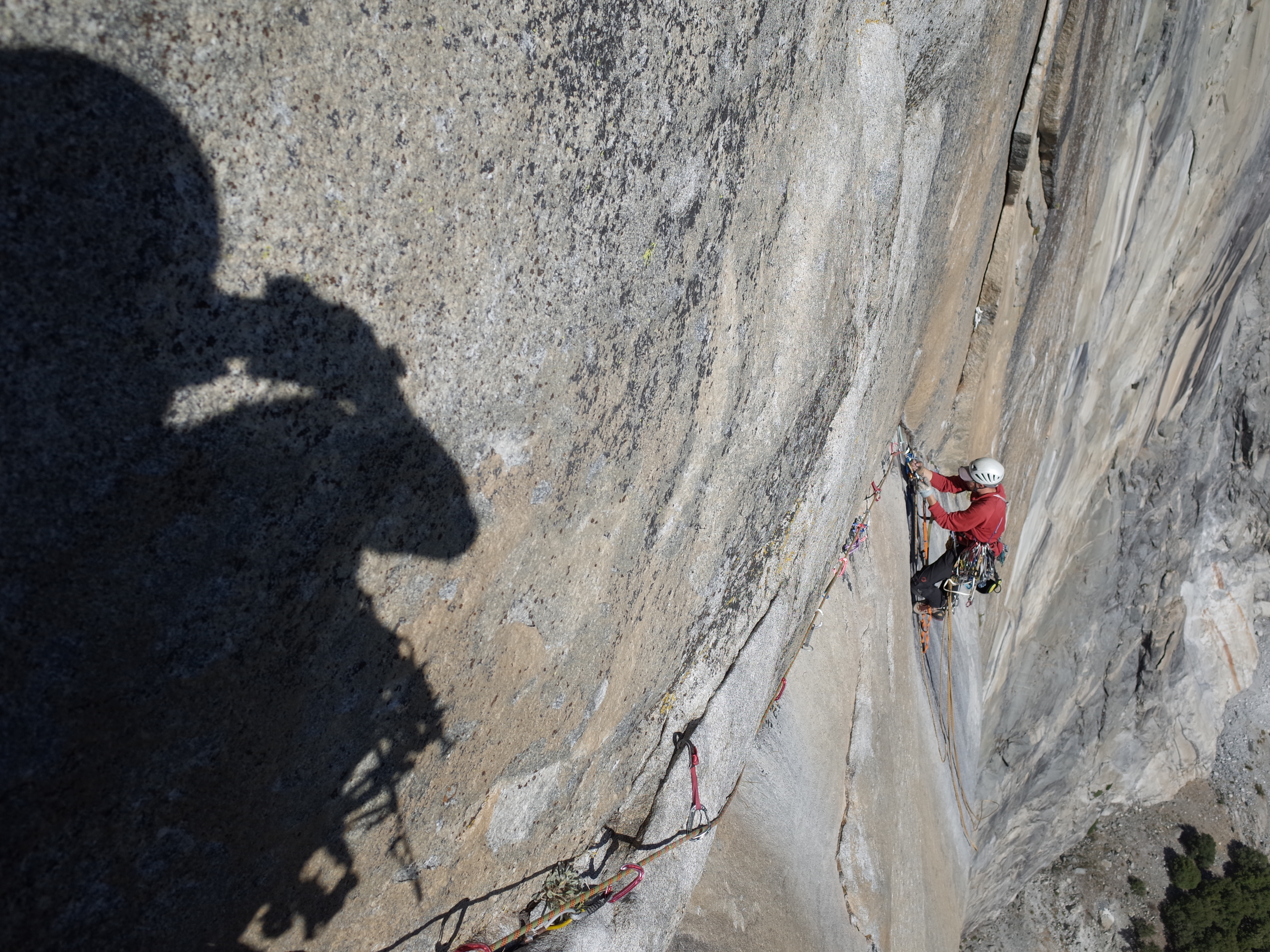
The second retrieving placements (including cam hooks) on El Capitan

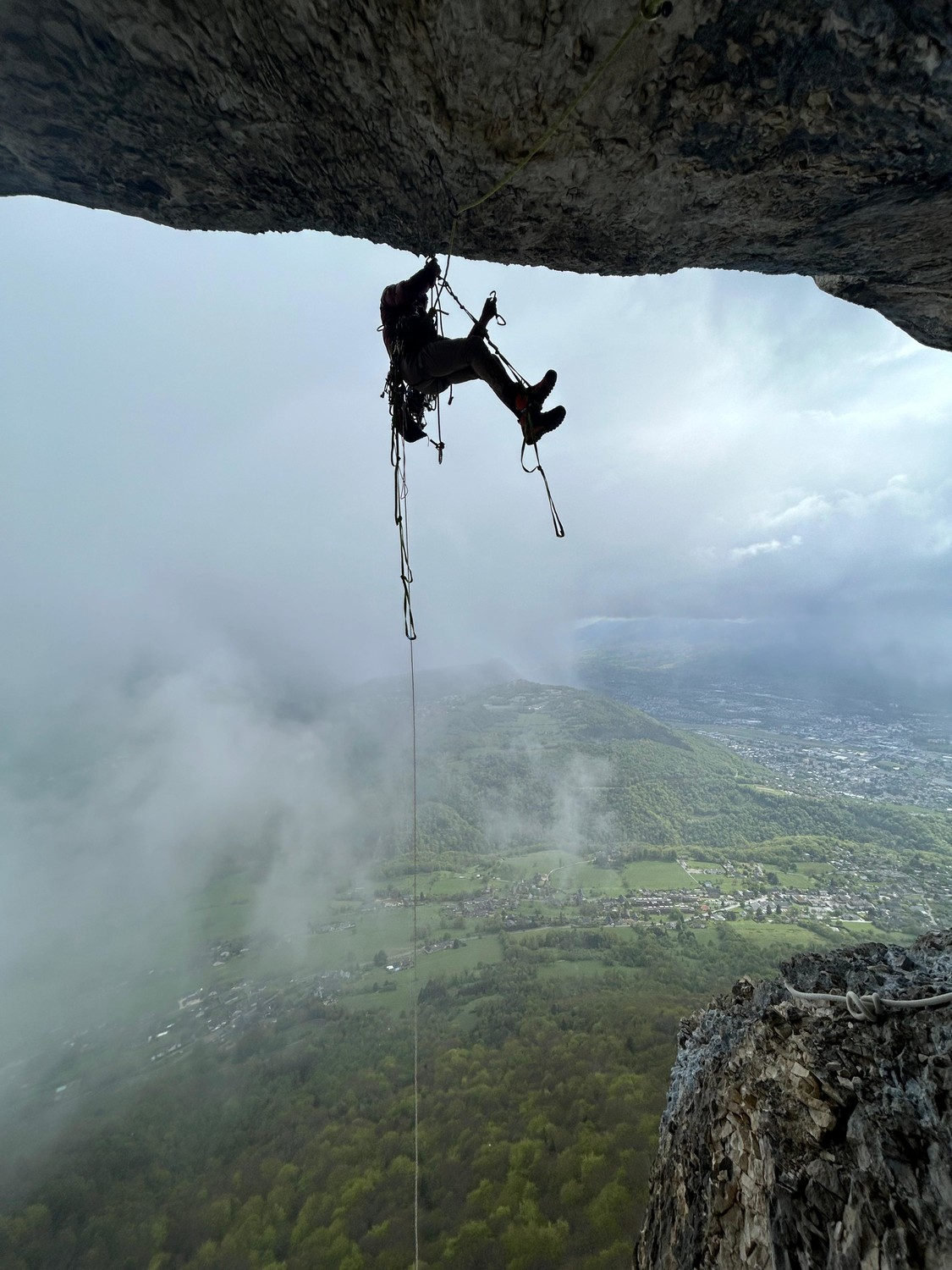
Using aiders on the roof of Peter Pan

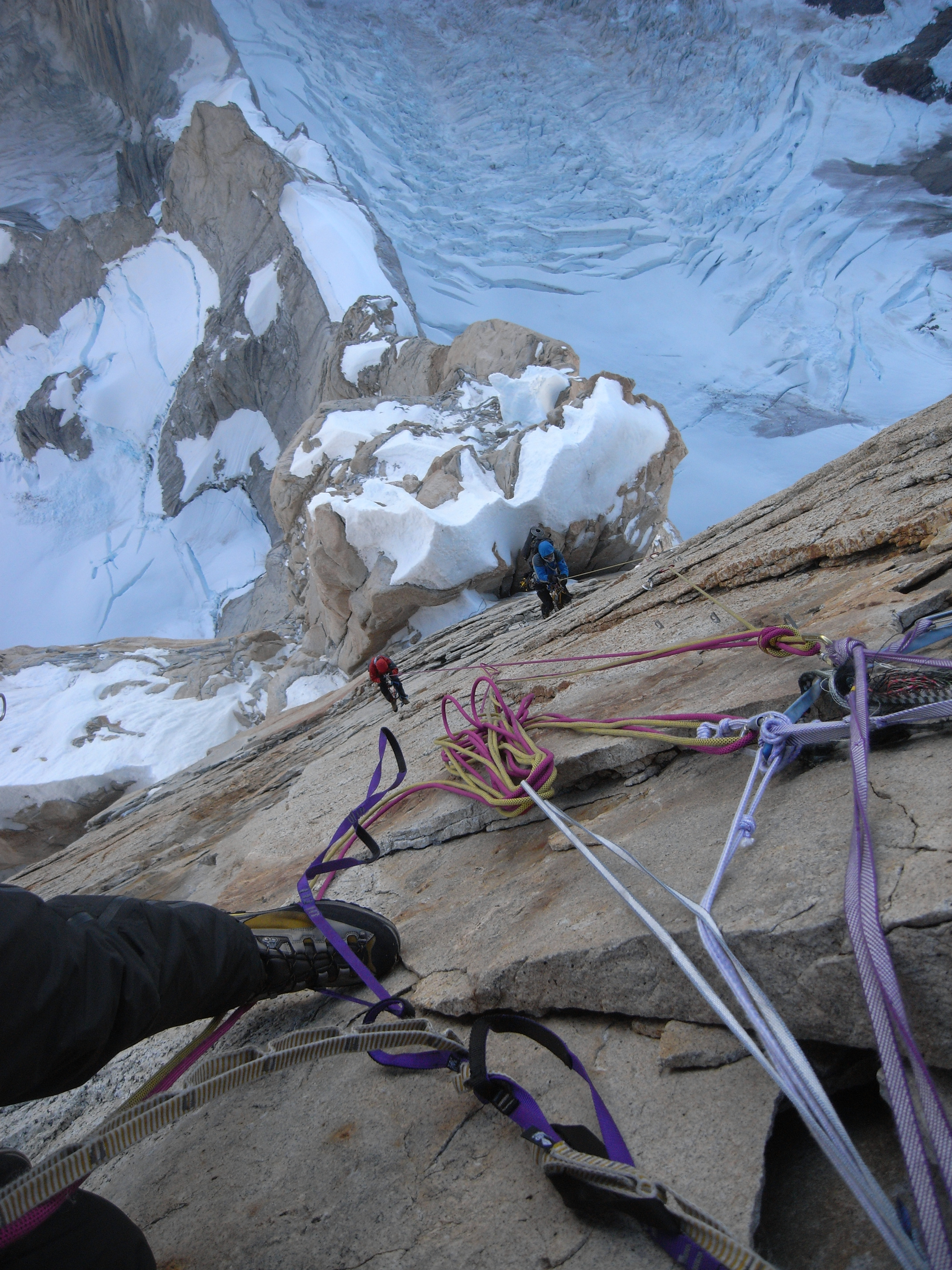
Jumaring on Cerro Torre headwall

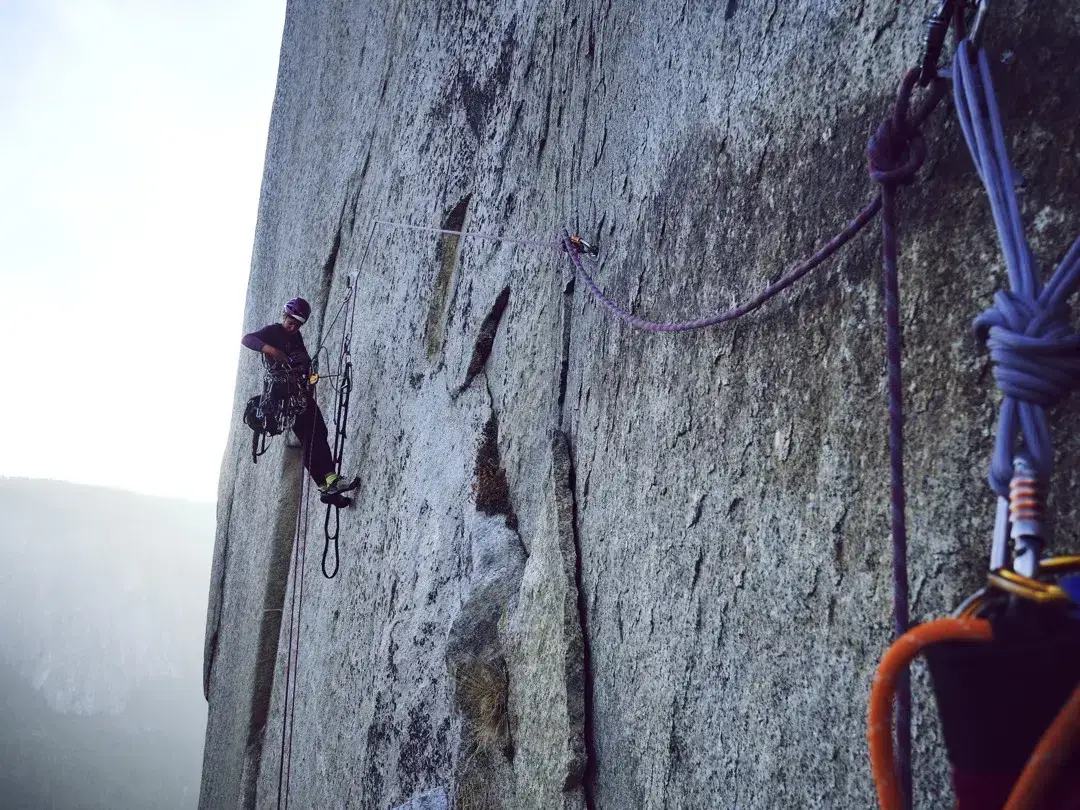
Using aiders on the route Tribal Rite (VI, 5.8, A3+), on El Capitan

Aid climbing, for both "clean" and "traditional", is a very different type of climbing to traditional climbing, relying almost exclusively on mechanical devices for upward momentum. A number of specific techniques are important in aid climbing, which include the following:

=== Making placements ===
Aid climbing relies on the climber making placements onto the rock into which they attach aiders and ascend. Traditional aid climbing involved hammering in fixed placements (e.g. pitons, bolts, copperheads), a practice that made traditional aid climbing routes easier over time as later teams could use the placements of earlier teams. On advanced aid routes (i.e. A-grade above A3+), the act of hammering in fixed placements can be enough to shake the climber off the existing tenuous placements and so care and skill are required. Clean aid climbing avoids using any hammers and so the placements are effectively those of a traditional climber although hooks are also used. Aid climbers generally try to make placements as high above their current position as possible to move efficiently.

=== Using aiders ===
Once a new placement is made, the aid climber will clip their daisy chain and an aider into the latest placement above their head and then bounce-test it; on passing that test, they then fully step into the aider attached to this new placement while clipping in the rope into the lower placement. Once completed, they release the lower daisy chain and its aider from the lower placement and climb up the new aider. These steps must be done in sequence to avoid a position in which the climber comes free of any placement or becomes temporarily dependent on a weak position.

=== Bounce testing ===
Free climbers will know if their protection placements can carry the weight of a fall only if it happens; some will pull on their placements as a simple test, but placing their body weight on the placement would be a form of aid. In contrast, aid climbers continuously "bounce test" their placements by loading their body weight onto them while using the lower placement as a backup in case the new placement fails. Excessive bounce-testing can make the extraction of the placements by the second climber difficult (i.e. the placements become really wedged into the cracks) and can result in longer timelines, damaged rock (where hammers are used to extract the placement), or having to leave placements on the route.

=== Jumaring on fixed ropes ===
The second climber in aid climbing usually jumars up on a fixed rope while taking out any removable placements on the way. Even the leader may also jumar back up the rope after having retrieved lower pieces of equipment that are needed again. That is in contrast to traditional climbing where the second (or belayer) will normally climb the route (albeit on a top rope).

== Grading ==
=== Issues with aid grading ===
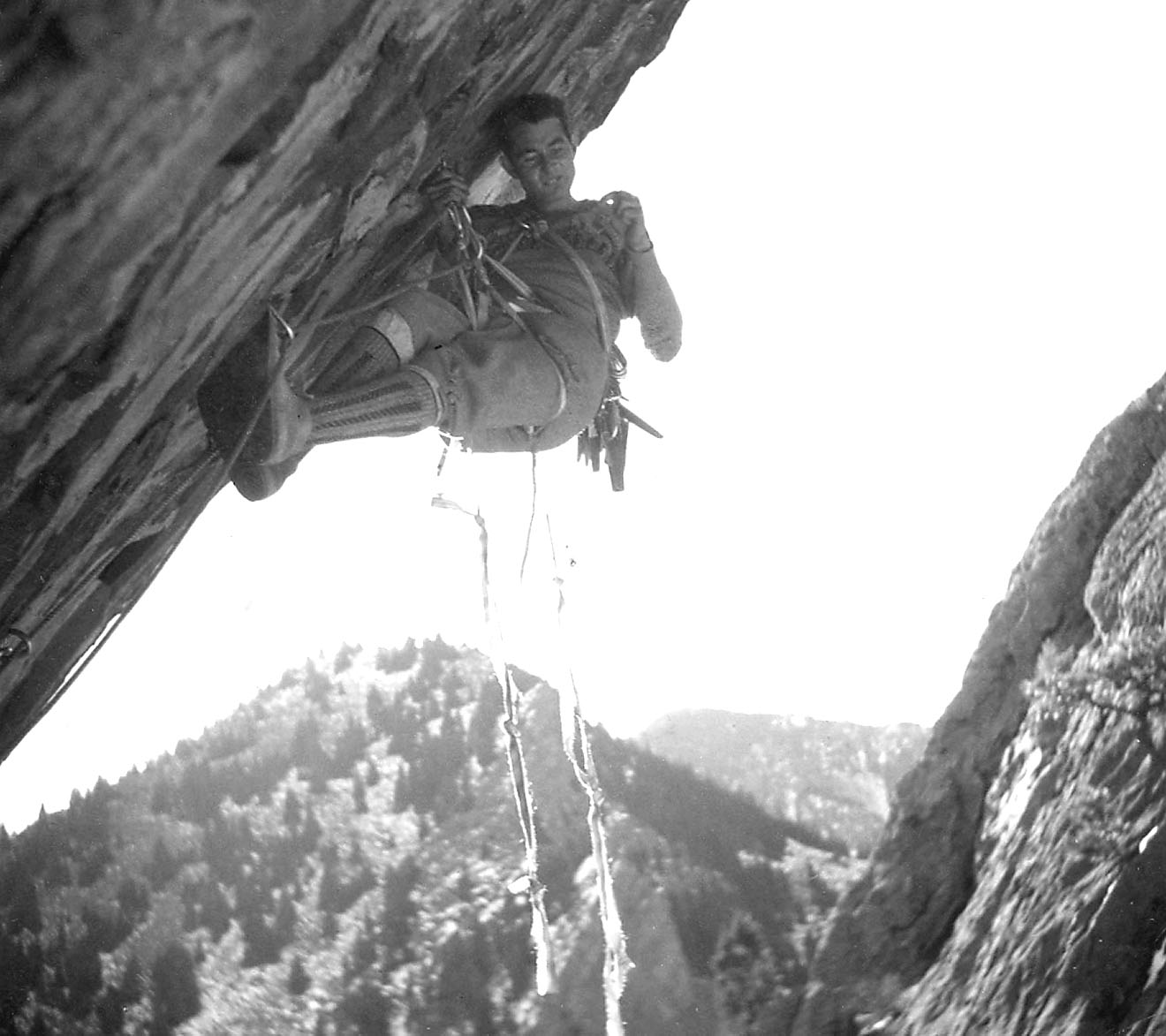
Layton Kor on the first ascent of Exhibit A Eldorado Canyon; the route was then graded 5.9 A4 (original A-grade), but is now graded 5.8 C2+ R (post "new-wave" C-grade).

The grading of aid climbs is regarded as being complex and in a state of flux. Aid grades can change materially over time due to improvements in aid equipment and the impact of repeated ascents that subsequent aid climbing teams make to a route. Climbing author Chris McNamara outlines in his 2011 book Yosemite Big Walls, how the grade of a typical "new A5 route" in Yosemite evolves over time:

- A5. First 5 teams to ascend: The new route has very little installed or fixed in-situ equipment (e.g. copperheads, pitons, bolts), and the rock is weak and fragile in places.
- A4. Teams 6 to 20 ascend: Half the copperheads are now fixed, pin placements are solid (from repeated hammering), bolts have replaced pulled or broken rock features; some 'chicken bolts' (i.e. excess bolting) are added at cruxes, and fully bolted belay anchors in places.
- A3/A4. Teams 21 to 40 ascend: Almost all of the copperheads are fixed; all of the weak and loose rock is gone; more belay bolts and "chicken bolts" have been installed.
- A3+. Teams +41 ascend: The route now "reaches equilibrium"; all copperheads are in place and the cruxes fixed; piton placements so beat out that they now easily take hammerless gear.

While different aid grading systems have been devised to address this (e.g. the "new wave"), in Yosemite Big Walls, McNamara argues: "Although it was originally touted as being more precise, than the previous A1-A5 system, it is now clear the new wave system only brought more confusion to the rating process". In practice, aid-climbing authors use a "composite" of the two systems (original and "new wave"), going from A0 to A6, and focused on the number of "bodyweight placements" (i.e. "tenuous" aid placements that can hold only a static bodyweight) as opposed to "bombproof placements" (belay-like aid placements that can hold a falling body) on a pitch, as a guide to the consequences of any leader fall.

=== Original A-grades ===
Original aid climbing grades go from A0 to A5 and focus on the number of "bodyweight placements" as opposed to "bombproof placements" on a given pitch. They are less concerned with the physical demands of an aid route. In Yosemite, the "R" and "X" suffixes of the American YDS free climbing system are added for routes with dangers of falls onto ledges or ramps or the risk of cutting the rope on an edge, such as pitch 13 on Reticent Wall at A4R.

The original aid climbing grades are described by the American Alpine Club as follows: "In general, older routes, routes with little aid, and those put up by climbers without extensive big-wall experience use the original aid rating system":

- A0: "Occasional aid moves are often done without aiders (etriers) or climbed on fixed gear; sometimes called French free".
- A1: "All placements are solid and easy".
- A2: "Good placements, but sometimes tricky to find".
- A3: "Many difficult, insecure placements, but with little risk".
- A4: "Many placements in a row that hold nothing more than body weight".
- A5: "Enough body-weight placements in a row that one failure results in a fall of at least 20 metres".

=== New wave A-grades ===
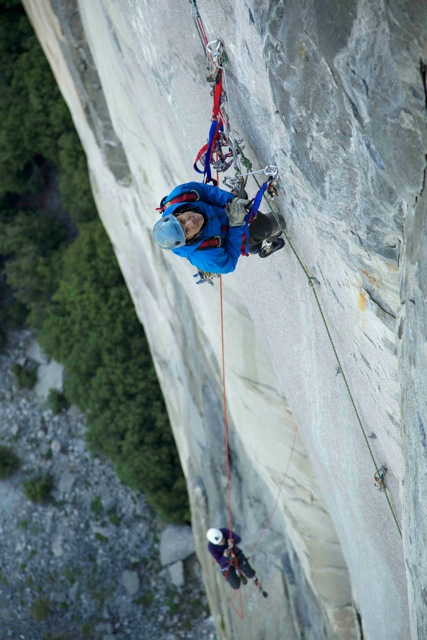
Climbers aiding on Zodiac (VI 5.8 A2+), on El Capitan

In the 1990s, Yosemite aid climbers created the "new wave" aid grading system that expanded the range of the original system to A6, introduced an intermediate (+) grade from A2 onwards for specific strenuous sections, and gave detailed definitions for each level. As with the original system, the main focus is still on discerning the number of "bodyweight placements" on a route, and therefore the consequences of a fall.

"New wave" grades are described by the American Alpine Club (republished in 2013) as: "Newer routes put-up by big-wall aficionados often are given a "New Wave" aid rating using the same symbols with new definitions":

- A1: "Easy aid. No risk of a piece pulling out".
- A2: "Moderate aid. Solid gear that's more difficult to place".
- A2+: "10-metre fall potential from tenuous placements, but without danger".
- A3: "Hard aid. Many tenuous placements in a row, 15-metre fall potential, could require several hours for a single pitch".
- A3+: "A3 with dangerous fall potential".
- A4: "Serious aid. 30-metre ledge-fall potential from continuously tenuous gear".
- A4+:"Even more serious, with even greater fall potential, where each pitch could take many hours to lead".
- A5: "Extreme aid. Nothing on the entire pitch can be trusted to hold a fall".
- A6: "A5 climbing with belay anchors that won't hold a fall either".

=== Clean C-grades ===
When the original or the "new wave" aid climbs can be ascended without the use of a hammer (for pitons or copperheads) the "A" suffix is replaced by a "C" to denote "clean climbing". In Yosemite, an "F" suffix is placed after the "C" if fixed gear (e.g. bolts) is still required.

== Milestones ==
The following are some of the most notable milestones in the development of aid climbing routes:

=== High altitude and expedition ===
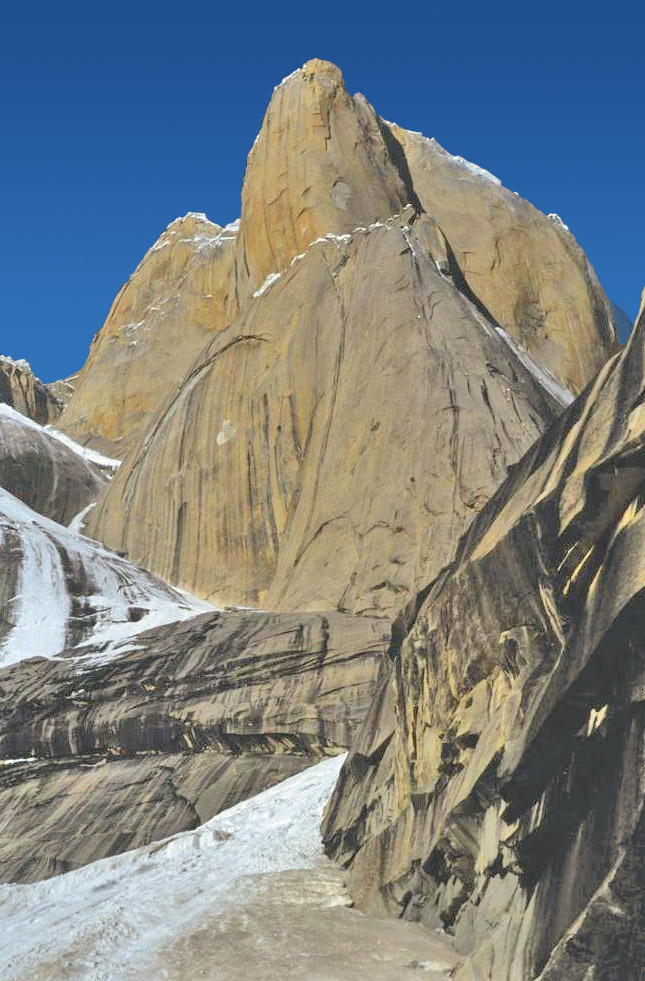
Great Trango Tower in Pakistan has the world's longest 'vertical' rock climbing route, (Note: The world's longest continuous rock climbing route is the 'horizontal' traverse route, the El Capitan Girdle Traverse (4,500 metres, 75-pitches, 5.10 A4), which is on El Capitan in Yosemite.) which is the aid climbing route known as The Grand Voyage (1,340 metres, VII 5.10 A4+ WI3)

- 1991. Wolfgang Gullich, Kurt Albert, Bernd Arnold, Norbert Bätz, and Peter Dittrich climb Riders on the Storm on the Cordillera Paine in 21-days with 44-pitches, VI 5.12d A3; considered the "crown jewel" of the Torres del Paine. It was freed in 2024 at 5.13a (7c+) by Siebe Vanhee, Sean Villanueva O'Driscoll, Nicolas Favresse, and Drew Smith, who said conditions makes it feel a 5.14.
- 1992. John Middendorf and Xaver Bongard climb The Grand Voyage on the East Face of Great Trango Tower in 16-days with 33-pitches, VII 5.10 A4+ WI3; at over 1,340 metres in length, The Grand Voyage is the world's longest 'vertical' rock climbing route, and at a very high altitude.

=== North America ===
- 1957. Royal Robbins, Jerry Gallwas, and Mike Sherrick climb the Northwest Face of Half Dome in Yosemite in 5 days with 25-pitches, 5.7 A3, 275 pitons and 20 aid bolts. Birth of modern US big wall climbing; historians split the climbing history of Yosemite into: "before and after Half Dome".
- 1958. Warren Harding George Whitmore and Wayne Merry climb the 3,000-foot The Nose of El Capitan in 45 days with 31-pitches, 5.8 A3, 600 pitons and 125 aid bolts; climb gets worldwide recognition but is controversial among climbers for its excessive use of aid climbing techniques.
- 1961. Royal Robbins, Chuck Pratt, and Tom Frost, climb the Salathé Wall on El Capitan in 6 days with 35-pitches, 5.9 A4, 484 pitons, and only 13 aid bolts; one of the hardest big wall aid-climbs in the world at the time, and completed without fixed ropes.
- 1978. Jim Bridwell, Dale Bard and Dave Diegelman climb Sea of Dreams on El Capitan in 27-pitches, VI 5.9 A4+ (it started at A5), and with minimal bolts and pitons (mostly RURPs); was the hardest big wall aid-climb in the world at the time, with its infamous "Hook or Book" pitch, the first "you fall, you die" pitch on El Capitan and even decades later is still A4+; considered Bridwell's greatest route.
- 1995. Steve Gerberding, Lori Reddel, and Scott Stowe climb Reticent Wall on El Capitan in 21-pitches, VI 5.7 A5, considered at the time as one of the hardest aid climbing routes on El Capitan (and the world), and still remains an A5/4+-graded route.
- 1998. Warren Hollinger and Grant Gardner climb Nightmare on California Street on El Capitan, with 17-pitches, VI 5.10 A5, often considered El Capitan's hardest aid climb (alongside the controversial 1982 route, Wings of Steel); still remains unrepeated (2023).

== In film ==
A few notable films have been made focused on aid wall climbing including:

- Assault on El Capitan, a 2013 documentary film of Ammon McNeely's 2011 repeat of the controversial 1982 route, Wings of Steel, on El Capitan.
- The Inner Wall, a 2018 short documentary film from Reel Rock (Season 4, Episode 2) on Andy Kirkpatrick rope solo aid climbing on El Capitan.

== See also ==
- History of rock climbing
- List of grade milestones in rock climbing
