= Billy Westbay =

American rock climber

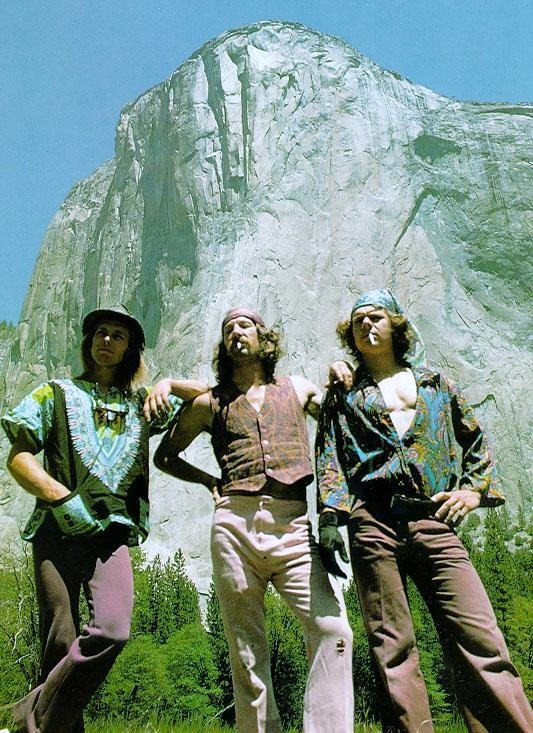
Billy Westbay, Jim Bridwell, and John Long after the first one-day ascent of the Nose in 1975

Billy Westbay was an American rock climber, known for his ascents of El Capitan in California.

Westbay worked as a climbing ranger in Rocky Mountain National Park, and was known for his skills in mountain rescue. He was a skilled and adventurous climber, and was part of the climbing scene that had gathered around Lumpy Ridge.

Westbay was a member of the Stonemasters, an influential group of climbers in California who gathered in locations such as the Yosemite Mountains.

Westbay died on 29 July 2000, of bladder cancer at the age of 47. Some of Billy's ashes were taken and released on top of Longs Peak, Rocky Mountain National Park, Colorado in the summer of 2004.
