= El Capitan =

Vertical rock formation in Yosemite National Park, California, US

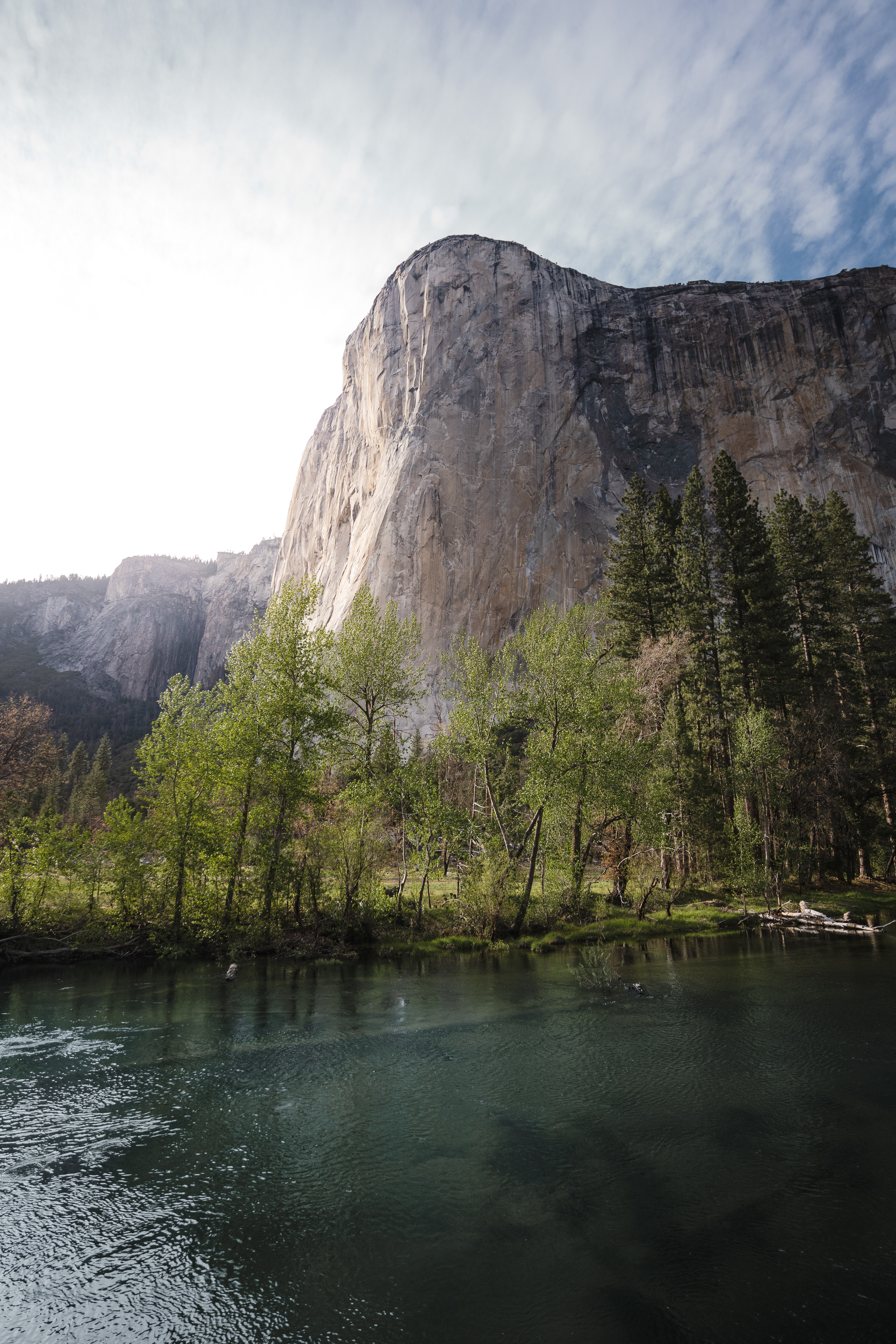
- Southwest face (left, in light) and southeast face (right, in shade) of El Capitan from Yosemite Valley; the Nose lies between the two faces

Highest point
- Elevation: 7,573 ft (2,308 m) NAVD 88
- Prominence: 9 feet (3 m)
- Isolation: 1.5 miles (2 km)
- Coordinates: 37°44′32″N 119°38′09″W

Naming
- Native name: To-tock-ah-noo-lah (Southern Sierra Miwok)
- English translation: "the captain"
- Pronunciation: /ɛl ˌkæpɪˈtæn/ el KAP-i-TAN

Geography
- Location within California
- Location: Mariposa County, California, U.S.
- Parent range: Sierra Nevada
- Topo map: USGS El Capitan

Geology
- Rock age: Cretaceous
- Mountain type: Granite rock

Climbing
- First ascent: November 12, 1958 by Warren Harding, George Whitmore, and Wayne Merry (Note: This is the first ascent accomplished on a rock face. It is possible to also ascend via hiking trails from the north.)
- Easiest route: Hike

El Capitan (Spanish: El Capitán; lit. 'the Captain') is a vertical rock formation in Yosemite National Park, on the north side of Yosemite Valley, near its western end. The granite monolith is about 3,000 feet (914 m) from base to summit along its tallest face and is a world-famous location for big wall climbing, including the disciplines of aid climbing, free climbing, and more recently for free solo climbing.

The top of El Capitan can be reached by hiking out of Yosemite Valley on the trail next to Yosemite Falls, then proceeding west. For climbers, the challenge is to climb up the sheer granite face. There are many named climbing routes, all of them arduous, including Iron Hawk and Sea of Dreams.

== Naming ==
The formation was named El Capitán by the Mariposa Battalion when they explored the valley in 1851. El Capitán ('the captain') was taken to be a loose Spanish translation of the local Miwok name for the cliff, Tutokanula, meaning 'rock chief' (the exact spelling of Tutokanula varies in different accounts as it is a phonetic transcription from the Miwok language).

The "Rock Chief" etymology is based on the written account of Mariposa Battalion doctor Lafayette Bunnell in his 1892 book. Bunnell reports that Ahwahneechee Chief Tenaya explained to him in 1851 that the massive formation, called Tutokanula, could be translated as 'rock chief' because the face of the cliff looks like a giant chief made of rock. In Bunnell's account, however, he notes that this translation may be wrong, stating: "I am not etymologist enough to understand just how the word has been constructed... [If] I am found in error, I shall be most willing to acknowledge it, for few things appear more uncertain, or more difficult to obtain, than a complete understanding of the soul of an Indian language."

An alternative etymology is that Tutokanula is Miwok for 'inchworm rock'. Julia F. Parker, the preeminent Coast Miwok-Kashaya Pomo basket-weaver and Yosemite Museum cultural ambassador since 1960, explains that the name Tutokanula, or 'inchworm rock', originates in the Miwok creation story for the giant rock, a legend in which two bear cubs are improbably rescued by a humble inchworm. In the story, a mother bear and her two cubs are walking along the river. The mother forages for seeds and berries while the two cubs nap in the sun on a flat rock. While the cubs sleep, the rock grows and grows, above the trees and into the sky. The mother bear is unable to climb the rock to get to her cubs and she becomes afraid and asks for help. The fox, the mouse, the mountain lion, and every other animal tries to climb to the top of the giant rock but they each fail. Finally, the lowly little inchworm tries the climb and successfully makes it all the way to the top and rescues the cubs. All the animals are happy to see that the little inchworm has saved the two bear cubs and the rock is named in the inchworm's honor.

The 'inchworm rock' version of the meaning of Tutokanula is also described in the story Two Bear Cubs: A Miwok Legend from California's Yosemite Valley by Robert D. San Souci and in the First People Miwok recounting of the El Cap legend.

== Geology ==
El Capitan is composed almost entirely of a pale, coarse-grained granite approximately 100 MYA (million years old). In addition to El Capitan, this granite forms most of the rock features of the western portions of Yosemite Valley. A separate intrusion of igneous rock, the Taft Granite, forms the uppermost portions of the cliff face.

A third igneous rock, diorite, is present as dark-veined intrusions through both kinds of granite, especially prominent in the area known as the North America Wall.

Along with most of the other rock formations of Yosemite Valley, El Capitan was carved by glacial action. Several periods of glaciation have occurred in the Sierra Nevada, but the Sherwin Glaciation, which lasted from approximately 1.3 MYA to 1 MYA, is considered to be responsible for the majority of the sculpting. The El Capitan Granite is relatively free of joints, and as a result the glacial ice did not erode the rock face as much as other, more jointed, rocks nearby. Nonetheless, as with most of the rock forming Yosemite's features, El Capitan's granite is under enormous internal tension brought on by the compression experienced prior to the erosion that brought it to the surface. These forces contribute to the creation of features such as the Texas Flake, a large block of granite slowly detaching from the main rock face about halfway up the side of the cliff.

== Climbing history ==
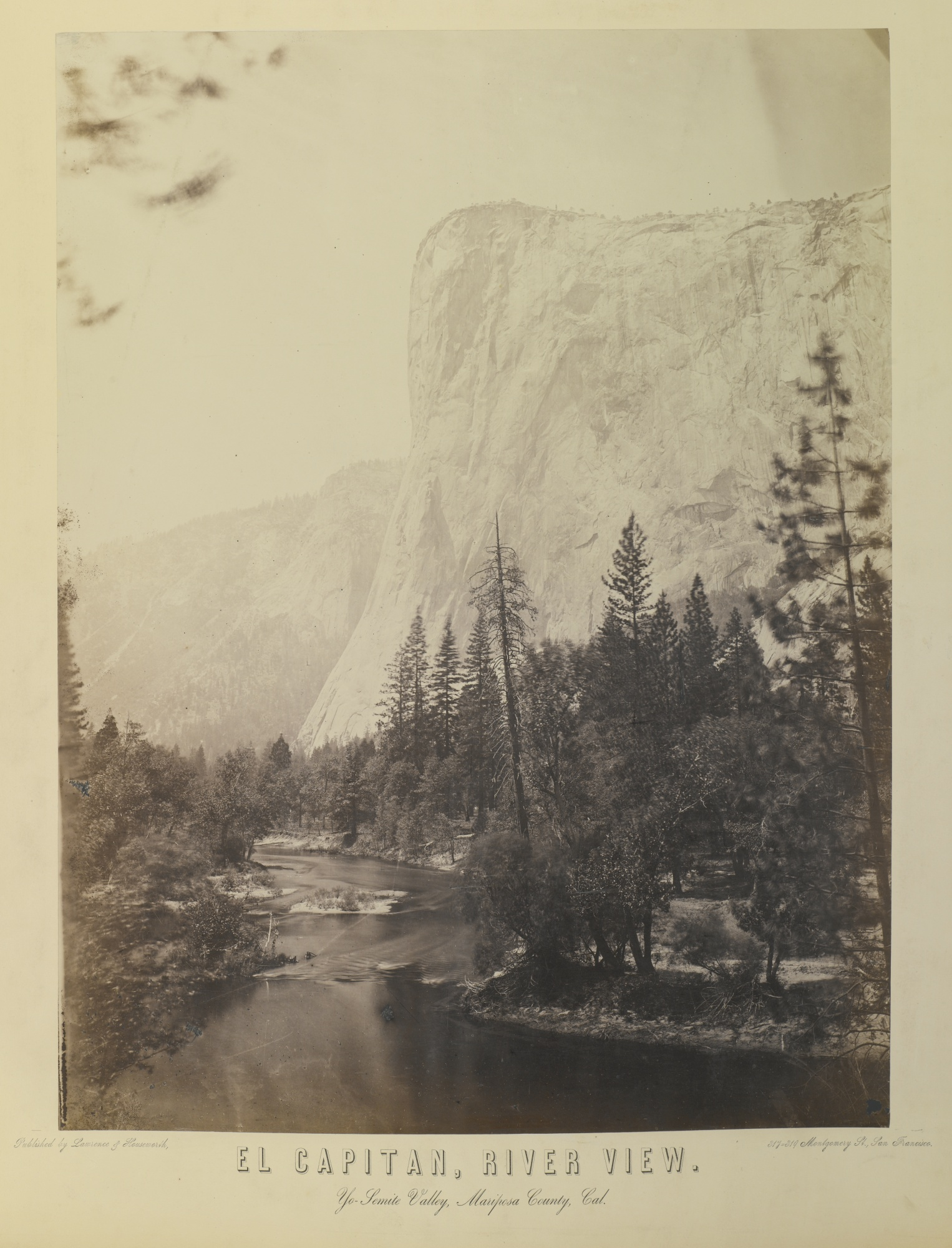
1864 photo of El Capitan by Charles Leander Weed

Between the two main faces, the Southwest (on the left when looking directly at the wall) and the Southeast, is a prow. While today there are numerous established big wall climbing routes on both faces (for both free climbing and aid climbing), the most popular and most historically famous route is The Nose, which follows this prow.

=== Pioneering The Nose ===
The Nose was climbed in 1958 by Warren Harding, Wayne Merry and George Whitmore in 47 days using "siege" tactics: climbing in an expedition style using fixed ropes along the length of the route, linking established camps along the way. The fixed manila ropes allowed the climbers to ascend and descend from the ground throughout the 18-month project, although they presented unique levels of danger as well, sometimes breaking due to the long exposure to cold temperatures. The climbing team relied heavily on aid climbing, using rope, pitons and expansion bolts to make it to the summit. The second ascent of The Nose was in 1960 by Royal Robbins, Joe Fitschen, Chuck Pratt and Tom Frost, who took seven days in the first continuous climb of the route without siege tactics. The first solo climb of The Nose was done by Tom Bauman in 1969. The first ascent of The Nose in one day was accomplished in 1975 by John Long, Jim Bridwell and Billy Westbay.

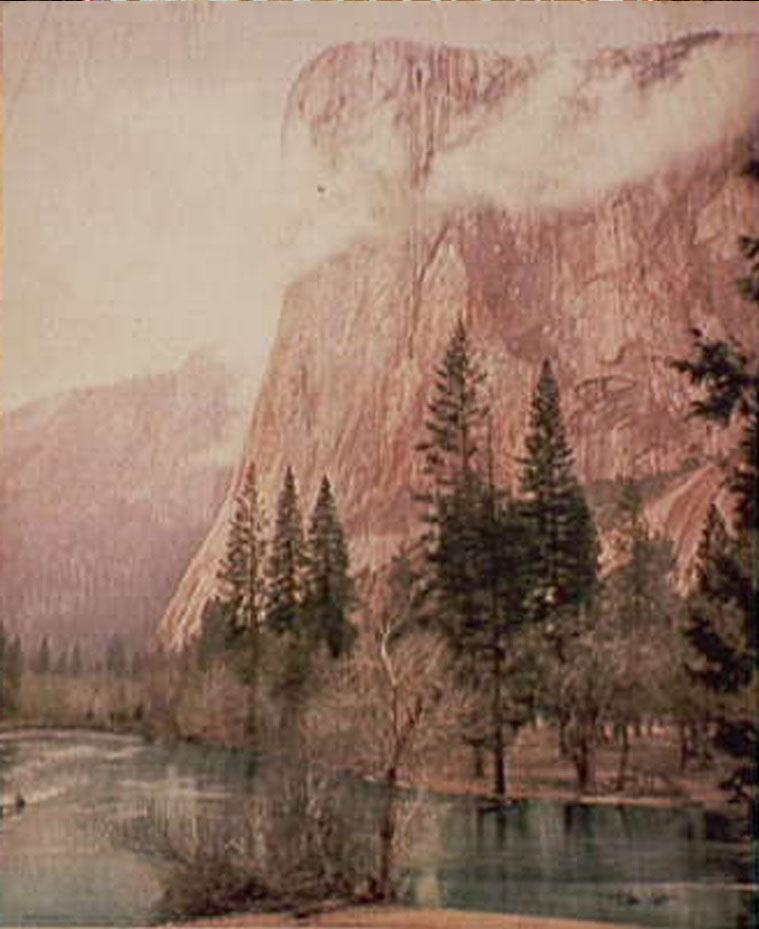
William Henry Jackson's 1899 photograph of El Capitan

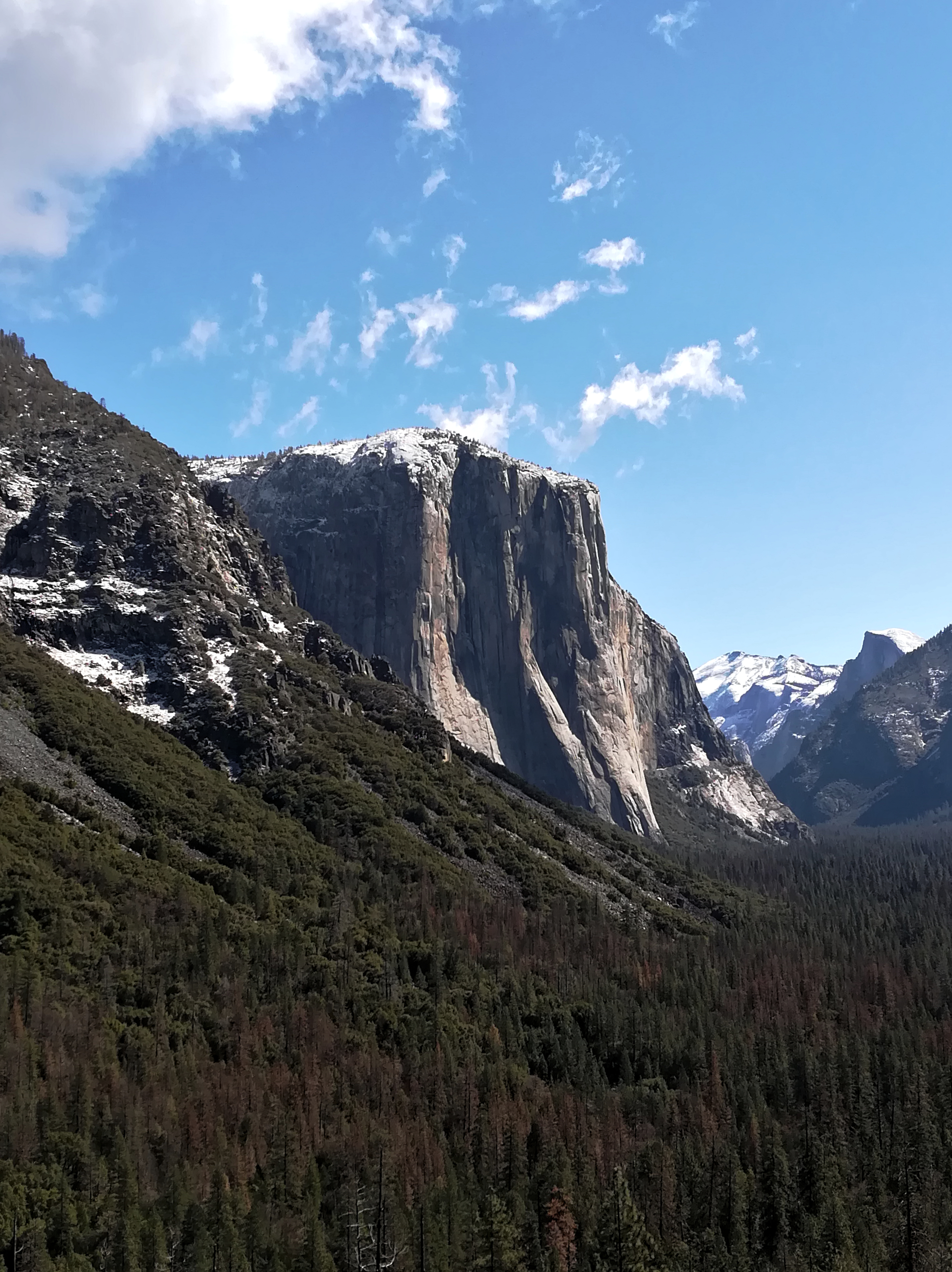
El Capitan viewed from Tunnel View

=== Expansion of routes ===
Efforts during the 1960s and 1970s explored the other faces of El Capitan, and many of the early routes are still popular today. Among the early classics are the Salathé Wall (1961, Royal Robbins, Chuck Pratt and Tom Frost) on the southwest face, and the North America Wall (1964, Royal Robbins, Yvon Chouinard, Chuck Pratt and Tom Frost) on the southeast face. Also climbed in the 1960s are routes such as: Dihedral Wall (1962, Ed Cooper, Jim Baldwin and Glen Denny); West Buttress (1963, Layton Kor and Steve Roper); and Muir Wall (1965, Yvon Chouinard and TM Herbert). Later ascents include: Wall of the Early Morning Light, now known as Dawn Wall, on the Southeast face, adjacent to the prow (1970, Warren Harding and Dean Caldwell); Zodiac (1972, Charlie Porter (solo)); The Shield (1972, Porter and Gary Bocarde); Mescalito (1973, Porter, Steve Sutton, Hugh Burton and C. Nelson); Pacific Ocean Wall (1975, Jim Bridwell, Billy Westbay, Jay Fiske and Fred East); Sea of Dreams (1978, Bridwell, Dale Bard and Dave Diegelman); Jolly Roger (1979, Charles Cole and Steve Grossman); and Wings of Steel (1982, Richard Jensen and Mark Smith). Today there are over 70 routes on El Capitan of various difficulties and danger levels. New routes continue to be established, usually consisting of additions to, or links between, existing routes.

=== Solo ascents ===
After his successful solo ascent of the Leaning Tower, Royal Robbins turned his attention to the Yvon Chouinard-T.M. Herbert Muir Wall route, completing the first solo ascent of El Capitan in 10 days in 1968. The first solo ascents of El Capitan's four classic "siege" routes were accomplished by Tom Bauman on The Nose in 1969; Peter Hann on the Salathé Wall in 1972; Robert Kayen on the Layton Kor-Steve Roper West Buttress route in 1982; and Beverly Johnson on the Cooper-Baldwin-Denny Dihedral Wall route in 1978. Other noteworthy early solo ascents were the solo first ascent of Cosmos by Jim Dunn in 1972, Zodiac by Charlie Porter in 1972; Tangerine Trip by David Mittel in 1985; and The Pacific Ocean Wall by Rob Slater in 1982. These ascents took 7 to 14 days that required the solo climber lead each pitch, and then rappel, clean the climbing gear, reascend the lead rope, and haul equipment, food and water using a second haul rope. Alex Honnold was the first to free solo El Capitan entirely on June 3, 2017. It took him 3 hours and 56 mins to climb 2,900 ft (880 m) via the Freerider route.

=== Ascents by women ===
El Capitan, Yosemite Valley

Beverly Johnson successfully ascended El Capitan, via the Nose route, with Dan Asay in June 1973. In September 1973, Beverly Johnson and Sibylle Hechtel were the first team of women to ascend El Capitan via the Triple Direct route, which takes the first ten pitches of the Salathe Wall, then continues up the middle portion of El Capitan via the Muir Wall, and finishes on the upper pitches of the Nose route. In 1977, Molly Higgins and Barb Eastman climbed the Nose, to become the second party of women to climb El Capitan and the first to climb it via the Nose. In 1978, Bev Johnson was the first woman to solo El Capitan by climbing the Dihedral Wall. In 1993, Lynn Hill established the first free Ascent of The Nose (IV 5.14a/b). Hazel Findlay has made three free ascents of El Capitan, including the first female ascent of Golden Gate in 2011, the first female ascent of Pre-Muir Wall in 2012, and a three-day ascent of Freerider in 2013 and 'Salathe' in 2017. The oldest woman to climb El Capitan is Dierdre Wolownick, mother to Alex Honnold, who was 66 at the time when she first became the oldest woman to climb El Capitan in 2017, and later broke her own record and again became the oldest woman to climb El Capitan in 2021 on her 70th birthday. On June 12, 2019, 10-year-old Selah Schneiter became the then-youngest person to scale El Capitan, via The Nose route. On November 4, 2020, American Emily Harrington became the fourth woman to free climb El Capitan in a single day and the fourth person (and first woman) to have done so via the route Golden Gate.

=== Free climbing ===
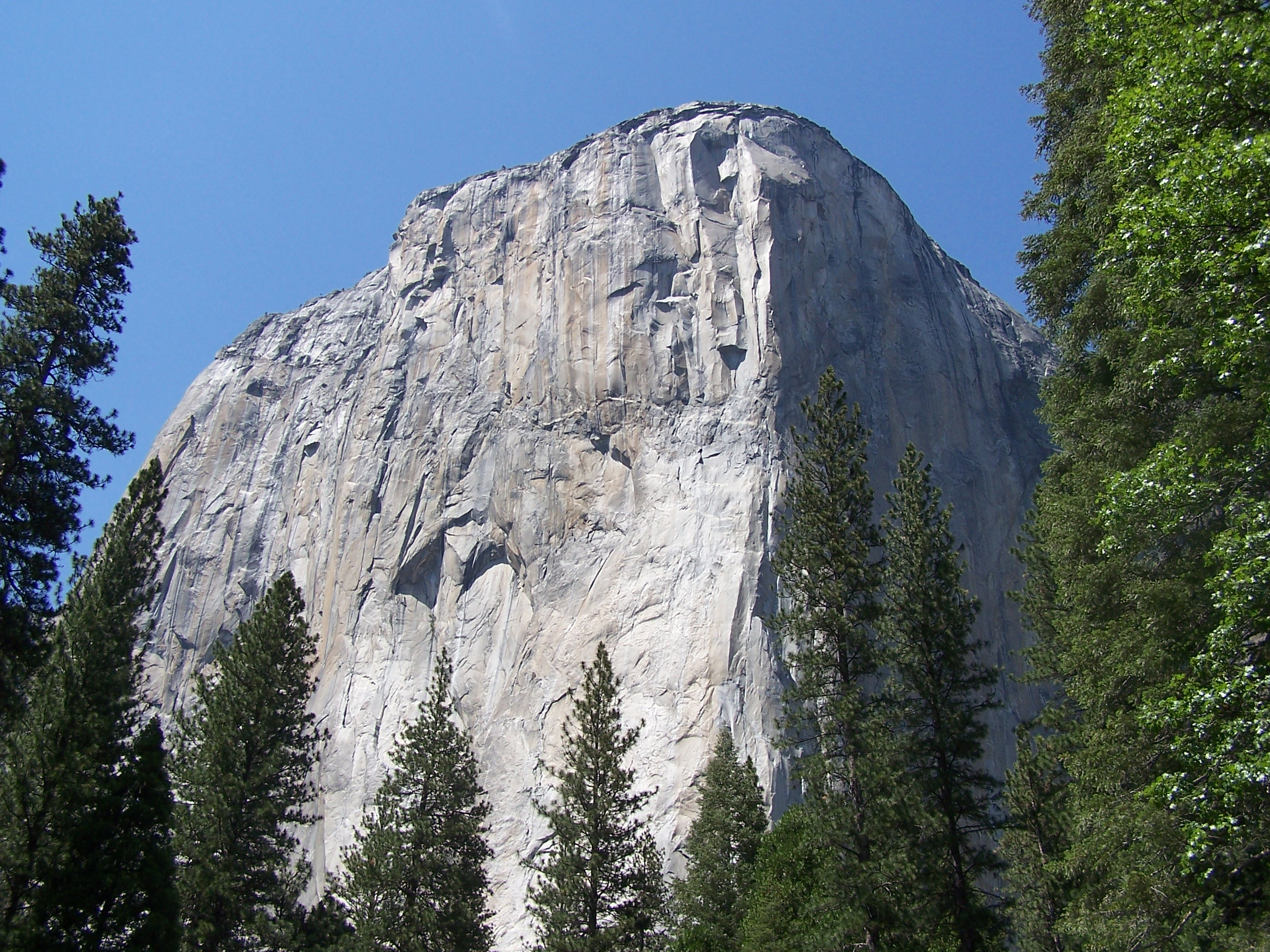
Full southwest face of El Capitan (in sunlight) from Northside Drive

As it became clear that any non-crumbling face could be climbed with sufficient perseverance and bolt-hole drilling, some climbers began searching for El Capitan routes that could be climbed either free or with minimal aid. The West Face route was free climbed in 1979 by Ray Jardine and Bill Price; but despite numerous efforts by Jardine and others, The Nose resisted free attempts for another fourteen years. The first free ascent of a main El Cap route, though, was not The Nose, but Salathé Wall. Todd Skinner and Paul Piana made the first free ascent over 9 days in 1988, after 30 days of working the route (graded 5.13b on the Yosemite Decimal System). The Nose was the second major route to be free climbed. Two pitches on The Nose blocked efforts to free the route: the "Great Roof" graded 5.13c and "Changing Corners" graded 5.14a/b. In 1993, Lynn Hill came close to freeing The Nose, making it past the Great Roof and up to Camp VI without falling, stopped only on Changing Corners by a piton jammed in a critical finger hold. After removing the piton she re-climbed the route from the ground. After four days of climbing, Hill reached the summit, making her the first person to free climb The Nose. A year later, Hill returned to free climb The Nose in a day, this time reaching the summit in just 23 hours and setting a new standard for free climbing on El Capitan.

The Nose saw a second free ascent in 1998, when Scott Burke summitted after 261 days of effort. On October 14, 2005, Tommy Caldwell and Beth Rodden, then husband and wife, became the third and fourth people (and the first couple) to free climb The Nose. They took four days on the ascent, swapping leads with each climber free climbing each pitch, either leading or following. Two days later, Caldwell returned to free climb The Nose in less than 12 hours. Caldwell returned two weeks later to free climb El Capitan twice in a day, completing The Nose with Rodden, then descending and leading Freerider in a combined time of 23 hours 23 minutes.

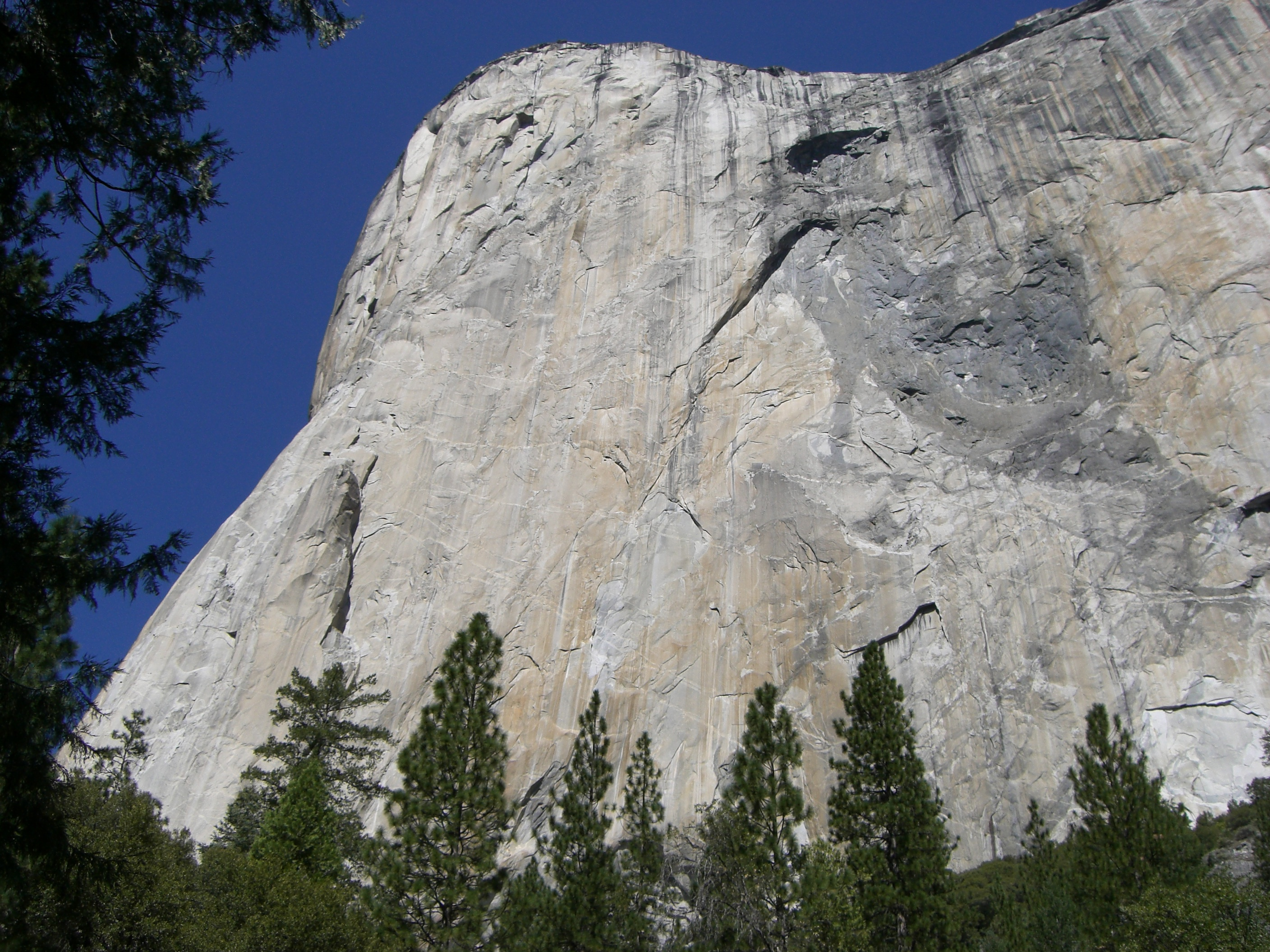
The Dawn Wall (and The Wall of Early Morning Light), the southeast face

On January 14, 2015, American climbers Tommy Caldwell and Kevin Jorgeson completed the first free climb of a route on the southeast face of El Capitan (known as The Wall of Early Morning Light), which they called The Dawn Wall; the climb took 19 days and created the world's first-ever multi-pitch climbing route at the grade of 9a (5.14d). In November 2016, Czech climber Adam Ondra made the first repeat of The Dawn Wall in 8 days, leading every single pitch himself. The Dawn Wall was repeated for the fourth time by Belgian climber Sébastien Berthe in January 2025.

In 2016, Pete Whittaker became the first person to make an all-free rope solo ascent—which means on every pitch one free climbs to an anchor, abseils to retrieve gear, and then jumars up again to the high point—of El Capitan's Freerider in one day. He left the ground at 3:02 pm on November 11 and finished at 11:08 am on November 12; a total of 20 hours and 6 minutes.

=== Free solo ===
Free solo climbing is a form of rock climbing where the climbers do not use any ropes, harnesses, or other protective equipment. This forces the climbers to rely on only their own individual preparation, strength, and skill.

On June 3, 2017, Alex Honnold completed the first and only free solo climb of El Capitan. He ascended the Freerider line in 3 hours and 56 minutes, beginning at 5:32 am and reaching the peak at 9:28 am. The climb was filmed for the 2018 documentary Free Solo.

=== Speed climbing ===
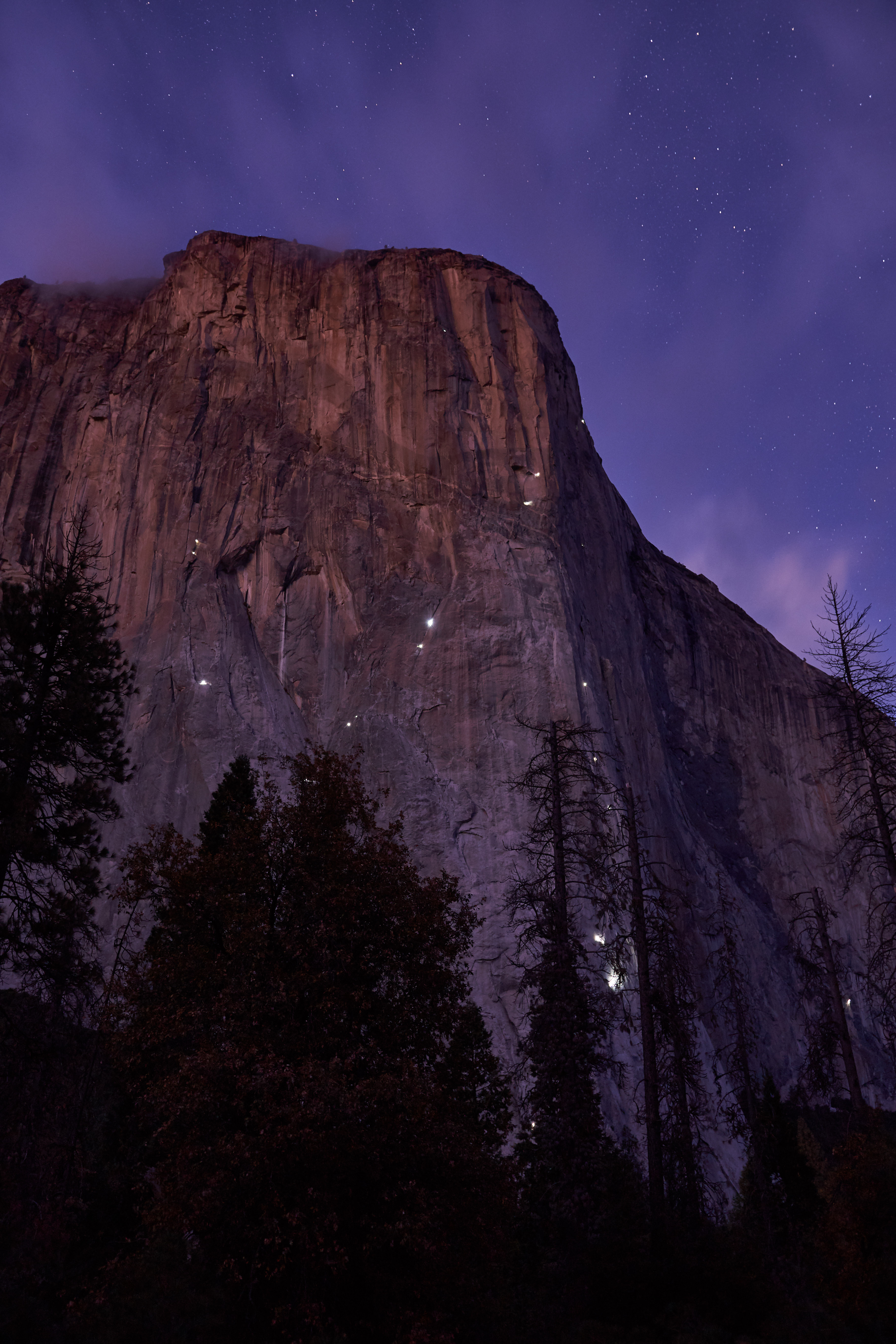
Climbers at night on El Capitan

The speed climbing record for the Nose has changed hands several times in the past few years. The current sub-two-hour record of 1:58:07 was set on June 6, 2018, by Alex Honnold and Tommy Caldwell after two other record-breaking climbs in the days before.

Mayan Smith-Gobat and Libby Sauter broke the speed record for an all-women team with a time of 4:43 on October 23, 2014.

=== Adaptive climbing ===
In October 2016, the American disabled athlete and professional adventurer Enock Glidden scaled El Capitan after doing more than 800 pull-ups a day to train for the climb. He was born with spina bifida, a neural tube defect that damages the spinal cord and nerves. Glidden was carried in a rescue basket and the descent took 12 hours.

=== Climber fatalities ===
Over thirty fatalities have been recorded between 1905 and 2018 while climbing El Capitan, including seasoned climbers. Critics blame a recent increase of fatalities (five deaths from 2013 to 2018) in part on increased competition around timed ascents, social media fame, and "competing for deals with equipment manufacturers or advertisers".

== BASE jumping ==
El Capitan has a controversial history regarding BASE jumping, and the National Park Service uses an old regulation, known as the aerial delivery regulation, that predates the existence of BASE jumping to criminally prosecute modern day BASE jumpers. Michael Pelkey and Brian Schubert made the first BASE jump from El Capitan on July 24, 1966. Both men sustained broken bones from the jump. During the 1970s, with better equipment and training, many BASE jumpers made successful jumps from El Capitan. In 1980 the National Park Service experimented with issuing BASE-jumping permits. The first permitted BASE jump was performed on August 4, 1980, by Dean Westgaard of Laguna Beach. These legal jumps resulted in no major injuries or fatalities. After a trial lasting only ten weeks, the National Park Service ceased issuing permits and effectively shut down all BASE jumping on El Capitan. On October 22, 1999, 60-year-old Jan Davis died after BASE jumping from El Capitan while using borrowed equipment, with which she was unfamiliar, so that her own equipment would not be confiscated by NPS rangers waiting to arrest her. She was part of an event to protest the death of Frank Gambalie, who had landed safely but drowned after being chased into a river by park rangers. Before his death in 1999, Gambalie had told a friend, "No way are they gonna get me. Let them chase me -- I'll just laugh in their faces and jump in the river."

== Popular culture ==
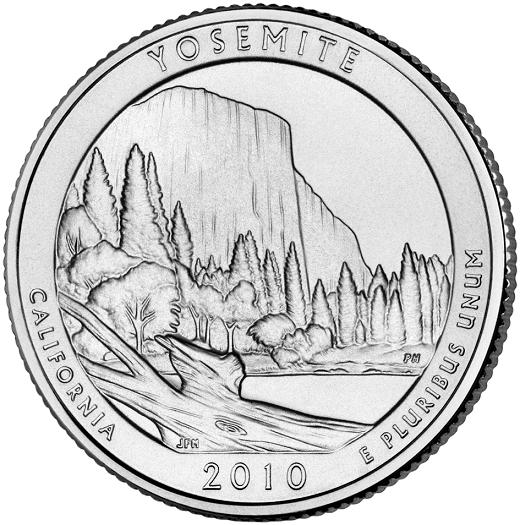
Reverse of 2010 "America the Beautiful" United States quarter dollar coin, depicting Yosemite National Park

=== In currency ===
El Capitan is featured on a United States quarter dollar coin minted in 2010 as part of the America the Beautiful Quarters series.

=== In film and TV ===
In the opening title sequence of Star Trek V: The Final Frontier, James T. Kirk, portrayed by William Shatner, attempts a free solo climb of El Capitan. It is also an important setting in the Netflix series Untamed.

=== In technology ===
Apple named its 12th major release of macOS after El Capitan.

The El Capitan supercomputer located in Lawrence Livermore National Laboratory is named after El Capitan. It was until 2026 the fastest supercomputer in the world according to the TOP500 rankings.

=== In music ===
"El Capitan" is a song by Scottish rock band Idlewild from their fourth studio album, Warnings/Promises (2005). It was released as the third single from the album on 11 July 2005 and charted at No. 39 in the UK Singles Chart.

"El Capitan" is a song by Omaha-based indie rock band Bright Eyes from their eleventh studio album, Five Dice, All Threes (2024).

== See also ==
- Horsetail Fall (Yosemite)
- Sentinel Dome
- Stawamus Chief
- Half Dome
