= Rope jumping =

Extreme sport

Rope jumping down a 160 metre free-fall, at Aiglun in France

Rope jumping, is the extreme sport of jumping off a high cliff while tied to a long climbing rope which is itself statically tied to a highline-anchor system at the top of the cliff. Rope jumping is notably different from the act of bungee jumping as there is much less stretch in the climbing rope, which allows the rope-jumper to experience a much longer sensation of freefall before the sensation of any arrest.

To avoid injury, and to avoid placing too much stress on the climbing rope, the rope-jumper sets up the anchor-system to the far right or far left of their jump-off point, thus creating a pendulum trajectory at the bottom of their free fall that absorbs much of the energy of the arrest (see video).

Rope jumping is considered a very dangerous sport that requires extensive technical knowledge and preparation to be done safely. American rope-jumper Dan Osman, who is considered the founder of the sport, died due to the failure of his anchor system while jumping from the Leaning Tower, Yosemite on 23 November 1998. Others have died rope jumping on large arches in Moab, Utah, and the Corona Arch in particular, to experience the unique effect of pendulumming through the open arch.

== See also ==
- BASE jumping
