= Dan Osman =

American rock climber (1963–1998)

Personal information
- Other names: Dano
- Born: February 11, 1963 Corona, California, U.S.
- Died: November 23, 1998 (aged 35) Yosemite National Park, California, U.S.
- Occupation: Rock climber

Climbing career
- Type of climber: Free solo climbing; Big wall climbing
- Highest grade: Redpoint: 5.12b (7b); Bouldering: V6 (7A); Free solo: 5.11+ (6c+/7a)
- Known for: Inventor of rope jumping

Daniel Eugene Osman (February 11, 1963 – November 23, 1998) was an American extreme sport practitioner, known for his free solo climbing and big wall climbing. He is considered the inventor of the extreme sport of rope jumping, which is falling several hundred feet from a cliff then being caught by a climbing safety rope, for which his record was a free fall of over 1,000 feet (300 m).

== Biography ==
Osman lived a bohemian lifestyle, working as a part-time carpenter and living in Lake Tahoe, California. He was the subject of several rock climbing videos, which brought free-soloing to a wider audience. Osman was also instrumental in the development of the Cave Rock climbing area at Tahoe and many other areas in the Carson City area. Osman had one daughter, Emma Osman.

Osman appeared in Eric Perlman's Masters of Stone series, free soloing Fire in the Hole (5.12b, now closed) on Cave Rock near Lake Tahoe, Atlantis (5.11+) on The Sorcerer in The Needles in the Sequoia National Forest, and Airy Interlude (5.10b, then 5.9) on The Witch, also in Needles (in California's Sierras). He also is featured crashing a BMX bicycle, ziplining off The Witch, taking a 192-foot (59 m) whipper for fun in Yosemite, and on-sight free-soloing Bolder Display of Power (5.11).

Osman gained a wider audience with his 4-minute-25-second speed solo of the route Bear's Reach (5.7), which was featured in Eric Perlman's film Masters of Stone 4. Osman's double dyno over the large gap between two holds for which the route is named has become an iconic image in American rock climbing.

=== Death ===
Osman died on November 23, 1998, at the age of 35 after his rope failed while performing a "controlled free-fall" jump from the Leaning Tower rock formation in Yosemite National Park. He had come back to Yosemite to dismantle the jump tower but apparently decided to make several jumps (over a few days) before doing so.

The failure was investigated by the National Park Service with assistance from Chris Harmston, Quality Assurance Manager at Black Diamond Equipment. Harmston concluded that a change in jump site angle probably caused the main jump rope, which consisted of several ropes tied together, to cross and catch on itself at a knot during his fall. This caused the rope to cut itself by melting. Harmston also noted that Osman's rope was in excellent condition, despite it having been left outdoors for some time.

Miles Daisher, who was with Osman when he made the jump, stated that the ropes used in his fatal jump had been exposed to inclement weather—including rain and snow—for more than a month before the fatal jump, but that the same ropes were used for several shorter jumps on the previous and same day.

== Notable climbs ==
- 1997 Ride the Lightning, VI 5.10 A4 WI3, Middle Triple Peak, Kichatna Mountains, Alaska. FA with Kitty Calhoun, Steve Gerberding and Jay Smith
- Lover's Leap. Bear's Reach, 5.7. Speed solo. 400+ ft in 4 min, 25 sec.

== See also ==
- Dean Potter
