= Sport climbing at the 2018 Asian Games – Men's combined =

Men's combined at the 2018 Asian Games
- Venue: Jakabaring Sport City
- Date: 23–26 August 2018
- Competitors: 23 from 13 nations

Medalists
gold medal	Chon Jong-won	South Korea
silver medal	Kokoro Fujii	Japan
bronze medal	Tomoa Narasaki	Japan

The men's competition combined climbing event at the 2018 Asian Games took place from 23 August to 26 August 2018 at Jakabaring Sport City, Palembang, Indonesia.

== Schedule ==
All times are Western Indonesia Time (UTC+07:00)

Date	Time	Event
Thursday, 23 August 2018	11:15	Qualification – Speed
Friday, 24 August 2018	09:00	Qualification – Boulder
Saturday, 25 August 2018	09:15	Qualification – Lead
Sunday, 26 August 2018	15:00	Final – Speed
Sunday, 26 August 2018	16:30	Final – Boulder
Sunday, 26 August 2018	19:00	Final – Lead

== Results ==
Legend

- T — Top hold
- z — Zone hold

=== Qualification ===
==== Speed ====
Rank	Athlete	Lane A	Lane B	Best
1	Kiromal Katibin (INA)	6.458	6.224	6.224
2	Seto (INA)	6.552	7.436	6.552
3	Rishat Khaibullin (KAZ)	6.940	6.803	6.803
4	Bharath Pereira (IND)	6.996	7.081	6.996
5	Au Chi Fung (HKG)	7.031	7.356	7.031
6	Tomoa Narasaki (JPN)	Fall	7.169	7.169
7	Chingkheinganba Maibam (IND)	7.199	7.297	7.199
8	Ma Zida (CHN)	7.326	7.997	7.326
9	Kim Han-wool (KOR)	7.348	7.728	7.348
10	Chon Jong-won (KOR)	7.375	7.539	7.375
11	Shoji Chan (HKG)	8.196	7.602	7.602
12	Artyom Devyaterikov (KAZ)	7.614	Fall	7.614
13	Taqiuddin Zulkifli (MAS)	7.729	9.924	7.729
14	Izzat Shokor (MAS)	10.926	7.825	7.825
15	Pan Yufei (CHN)	7.854	8.345	7.854
16	Winai Ruangrit (THA)	8.335	7.963	7.963
17	Kokoro Fujii (JPN)	8.207	9.410	8.207
18	Gerald Verosil (PHI)	9.368	8.399	8.399
19	Khosro Hashemzadeh (IRI)	Fall	8.420	8.420
20	Sirapob Jirajaturapak (THA)	8.978	Fall	8.978
21	Pranil Man Shrestha (NEP)	11.822	11.350	11.350
22	Pemba Sherpa (NEP)	12.848	13.000	12.848
23	Nyamdoogiin Kherlen (MGL)	13.367	Fall	13.367

==== Boulder ====
Rank	Athlete	Boulder				Result
Rank	Athlete	1	2	3	4	Result
1	Tomoa Narasaki (JPN)	T	T	T	T	4T7 4z7
2	Chon Jong-won (KOR)	T	T	T	T	4T11 4z7
3	Kim Han-wool (KOR)	T	T	T	T	4T12 4z11
4	Ma Zida (CHN)	z	T	T	T	3T17 4z17
5	Pan Yufei (CHN)	T	T	T		3T7 3z5
6	Kokoro Fujii (JPN)	T	T	T		3T7 3z6
7	Shoji Chan (HKG)	T	T	T		3T12 3z11
8	Au Chi Fung (HKG)	T	T	T		3T13 3z10
9	Bharath Pereira (IND)	T	z	z		1T6 3z19
10	Artyom Devyaterikov (KAZ)	T	z			1T2 2z5
11	Khosro Hashemzadeh (IRI)	T	z			1T3 2z5
12	Taqiuddin Zulkifli (MAS)		T			1T3 1z3
13	Rishat Khaibullin (KAZ)	z	z	z		0T0 3z6
14	Seto (INA)	z	z	z		0T0 3z9
15	Gerald Verosil (PHI)	z	z	z		0T0 3z11
16	Chingkheinganba Maibam (IND)	z	z	z		0T0 3z11
17	Winai Ruangrit (THA)	z	z	z		0T6 3z16
18	Izzat Shokor (MAS)		z	z		0T0 2z10
19	Kiromal Katibin (INA)	z	z			0T0 2z11
20	Sirapob Jirajaturapak (THA)	z				0T0 1z3
21	Nyamdoogiin Kherlen (MGL)					0T 0z0
21	Pranil Man Shrestha (NEP)					0T 0z0
21	Pemba Sherpa (NEP)					0T 0z0

==== Lead ====
Rank	Athlete	Result	Time
1	Tomoa Narasaki (JPN)	Top	3:01
2	Kokoro Fujii (JPN)	Top	3:45
3	Kim Han-wool (KOR)	Top	4:31
4	Chon Jong-won (KOR)	42	
5	Taqiuddin Zulkifli (MAS)	28+	2:14
6	Khosro Hashemzadeh (IRI)	28+	2:16
7	Au Chi Fung (HKG)	27+	2:18
8	Rishat Khaibullin (KAZ)	27+	2:46
9	Artyom Devyaterikov (KAZ)	27+	2:57
10	Shoji Chan (HKG)	27	2:44
11	Pan Yufei (CHN)	27	2:48
12	Winai Ruangrit (THA)	26+	
13	Ma Zida (CHN)	26	
14	Seto (INA)	25+	
15	Chingkheinganba Maibam (IND)	24	
16	Bharath Pereira (IND)	23+	
17	Izzat Shokor (MAS)	22+	
18	Kiromal Katibin (INA)	21+	
19	Pemba Sherpa (NEP)	20+	
20	Pranil Man Shrestha (NEP)	19	
21	Gerald Verosil (PHI)	18+	1:25
22	Sirapob Jirajaturapak (THA)	18+	1:46
23	Nyamdoogiin Kherlen (MGL)	14	

==== Summary ====
Rank	Athlete	Speed	Boulder	Lead	Total
1	Tomoa Narasaki (JPN)	6	1	1	6
2	Chon Jong-won (KOR)	10	2	4	80
3	Kim Han-wool (KOR)	9	3	3	81
4	Kokoro Fujii (JPN)	17	6	2	204
5	Au Chi Fung (HKG)	5	8	7	280
6	Rishat Khaibullin (KAZ)	3	13	8	312
7	Kiromal Katibin (INA)	1	19	18	342
8	Seto (INA)	2	14	14	392
9	Ma Zida (CHN)	8	4	13	416
10	Bharath Pereira (IND)	4	9	16	576
11	Shoji Chan (HKG)	11	7	10	770
12	Taqiuddin Zulkifli (MAS)	13	12	5	780
13	Pan Yufei (CHN)	15	5	11	825
14	Artyom Devyaterikov (KAZ)	12	10	9	1080
15	Khosro Hashemzadeh (IRI)	19	11	6	1254
16	Chingkheinganba Maibam (IND)	7	16	15	1680
17	Winai Ruangrit (THA)	16	17	12	3264
18	Mohd Izzat Shokor (MAS)	14	18	17	4284
19	Gerald Verosil (PHI)	18	15	21	5670
20	Sirapob Jirajaturapak (THA)	20	20	22	8800
21	Pemba Sherpa (NEP)	22	22	19	9196
22	Pranil Man Shrestha (NEP)	21	22	20	9240
23	Nyamdoogiin Kherlen (MGL)	23	22	23	11638

=== Final ===
==== Speed ====
Quarterfinals
1	Rishat Khaibullin (KAZ)	7.520
6	Kokoro Fujii (JPN)	13.046
2	Au Chi Fung (HKG)	Fall
5	Chon Jong-won (KOR)	7.895
3	Tomoa Narasaki (JPN)	7.017
4	Kim Han-wool (KOR)	7.389

Semifinals
1	Rishat Khaibullin (KAZ)	8.531
LL	Kim Han-wool (KOR)	9.052
5	Chon Jong-won (KOR)	7.328
3	Tomoa Narasaki (JPN)	7.431

Final
1	Rishat Khaibullin (KAZ)	7.186
5	Chon Jong-won (KOR)	7.375
Small final
LL	Kim Han-wool (KOR)	7.590
3	Tomoa Narasaki (JPN)	Fall

- Kim Han-wool advanced to the semifinal as the loser with the best time (lucky loser).

==== Boulder ====
Rank	Athlete	Boulder				Result
Rank	Athlete	1	2	3	4	Result
1	Chon Jong-won (KOR)	T	T	T	T	4T13 4z10
2	Tomoa Narasaki (JPN)	T	T	T	T	4T16 4z10
3	Kokoro Fujii (JPN)		z	z	T	1T4 3z8
4	Rishat Khaibullin (KAZ)		z	T	z	1T4 3z11
5	Kim Han-wool (KOR)		z			0T0 1z1
6	Au Chi Fung (HKG)		z			0T0 1z1

==== Lead ====
Rank	Athlete	Result	Time
1	Kokoro Fujii (JPN)	32+	
2	Tomoa Narasaki (JPN)	28+	2:19
3	Chon Jong-won (KOR)	28+	2:39
4	Kim Han-wool (KOR)	28+	3:33
5	Au Chi Fung (HKG)	26+	
6	Rishat Khaibullin (KAZ)	19+	

==== Summary ====
Rank	Athlete	Speed	Boulder	Lead	Total
1st place, gold medalist(s)	Chon Jong-won (KOR)	2	1	3	6
2nd place, silver medalist(s)	Kokoro Fujii (JPN)	5	3	1	15
3rd place, bronze medalist(s)	Tomoa Narasaki (JPN)	4	2	2	16
4	Rishat Khaibullin (KAZ)	1	4	6	24
5	Kim Han-wool (KOR)	3	5	4	60
6	Au Chi Fung (HKG)	6	6	5	180
