= Speed climbing at the 2021 IFSC Climbing World Cup =

- Location: Salt Lake City, United States; Villars, Switzerland
- Dates: 28 May – 3 July 2021

Champions
- Men: (Indonesia) Veddriq Leonardo
- Women: (United States) Emma Hunt

Speed climbing competitions at the 2021 IFSC Climbing World Cup were to be held at two locations, from 28 May to 3 July 2021. The International Federation of Sport Climbing had originally scheduled six speed climbing events concluding on 31 October, but COVID-19 travel restrictions resulted in the cancellation of events in Xiamen and Wujiang in China, Jakarta in Indonesia and Seoul in South Korea.

The top three in each competition received medals, and at the end of the season, the overall winners were awarded trophies. The overall winners were determined based upon points, which athletes were awarded for finishing in the top 30 of each individual event.

== Overview ==
Date	Location	Venue	Men	Women
May, 28–30	Salt Lake City, United States	Industry SLC	(Indonesia) Veddriq Leonardo	(Poland) Aleksandra Mirosław
July, 1–3	Villars, Switzerland	Place du Rendez-Vous	(Indonesia) Veddriq Leonardo	(Russia) Ekaterina Barashchuk
OVERALL WINNERS			(Indonesia) Veddriq Leonardo	(United States) Emma Hunt
NATIONAL TEAM			Indonesia	

== Records broken ==
Event	Round	Climber	Location	Time	Date
Men's speed	Qualification	(Indonesia) Kiromal Katibin	Salt Lake City, USA	5.258	May 28, 2021
Men's speed	Final	(Indonesia) Veddriq Leonardo	Salt Lake City, USA	5.208	May 28, 2021

== Competition format ==
The speed wall is standardized: 15 meters high, 5 degrees overhanging, same route.

In the qualifications, athletes race in both lane a and lane b; only their best times are recorded and used for seeding. Sixteen fastest athletes in the qualifications progress into the finals where athletes are seeded and raced head-to-head against.each other.

== Overall ranking ==
The overall ranking is determined based upon points, which athletes are awarded for finishing in the top 30 of each individual event. There are four competitions in the season. The national ranking is the sum of the points of that country's three best male and female athletes. Results displayed (in brackets) are not counted.

=== Men ===
The results of the ten most successful athletes of the Speed World Cup 2021:

Rank	Name	Points	Salt Lake City	Villars
1	(Indonesia) Veddriq Leonardo	200	1. 100	1. 100
2	(Indonesia) Kiromal Katibin	145	2. 80	3. 65
3	(Poland) Marcin Dzieński	96	3. 65	11. 31
4	(United States) John Brosler	81	4. 55	13. 26
5	(Russia) Dmitrii Timofeev	80	—	2. 80
6	(France) Pierre Rebreyend	59	7. 43	18. 16
7	(Russia) Vladislav Deulin	55	—	4. 55
8	(United States) Merritt Ernsberger	51	5. 51	—
8	(Iran) Mehdi Alipour Shenazandifard	51	—	5. 51
10	(Ukraine) Yaroslav Tkach	50	8. 40	21. 10

=== Women ===
The results of the ten most successful athletes of the Speed World Cup 2021:

Rank	Name	Points	Salt Lake City	Villars
1	(United States) Emma Hunt	131	2. 80	5. 51
2	(Poland) Patrycja Chudziak	120	4. 55	3. 65
3	(Poland) Aleksandra Mirosław	100*	1. 100	—
3	(Russia) Ekaterina Barashchuk	100*	—	1. 100
5	(France) Anouck Jaubert	94*	5. 51	7. 43
5	(Poland) Natalia Kalucka	94*	6. 47	6. 47
7	(Russia) Iuliia Kaplina	85	—	2. 80
8	(France) Capucine Viglione	74	8. 40	10. 34
9	(Japan) Miho Nonaka	65	3. 65	—
10	(Indonesia) Desak Made Rita Kusuma Dewi	55	—	4. 55

* = Joint place with another athlete

=== National teams ===
The results of the ten most successful countries of the Speed World Cup 2021:

Country names as used by the IFSC

Rank	Nation	Points	Salt Lake City	Villars
1	Indonesia	503	4. 180.0	2. 323.0
2	Poland	447	2. 267.0	3. 180.0
3	United States	396.8	1. 276.0	5. 120.8
4	Russia	384	—	1. 384.0
5	France	340	3. 207.0	4. 133.0
6	(Japan)	140.55	5. 139.55	15. 1.0
7	Italy	132.5	7. 75.0	7. 57.5
8	Ukraine	130	6. 95.0	10. 35.0
9	Austria	101.8	8. 63.9	9. 37.9
10	(Germany)	85.85	9. 63.0	12. 22.85

== Salt Lake City, United States (May, 28–30) ==
=== Men ===
38 men attended the event.

Kiromal Katibin of Indonesia set a world record time of 5.258 seconds in qualifying, a record that was broken the same day by fellow Indonesian, Veddriq Leonardo, who hit the buzzer at 5.20 in the final run against Katibin. Poland's Marcin Dzieński placed third after beating American John Brosler in the small final.

Rank	Name	Qual.	1/8	1/4	1/2	Small	Final
1st place, gold medalist(s)	(Indonesia) Veddriq Leonardo	5.37	5.55	5.42	5.38		5.20
2nd place, silver medalist(s)	(Indonesia) Kiromal Katibin	5.25	5.49	wildcard	5.35		fall
3rd place, bronze medalist(s)	(Poland) Marcin Dzieński	5.90	6.22	5.88	5.77	5.84	
4	(United States) John Brosler	5.60	5.72	5.98	5.76	6.89	
5	(United States) Merritt Ernsberger	6.19	7.82	6.13			
6	(Japan) Jun Yasukawa	6.253	6.18	6.23			
7	(France) Pierre Rebreyend	6.14	5.94	FS			
8	(Ukraine) Yaroslav Tkach	6.17	6.50	fall			
9	(Italy) Ludovico Fossali	6.09	5.95				
10	(France) Guillaume Moro	6.36	6.12				
11	(France) Mickaël Mawem	6.28	6.79				
12	(United States) Michael Finn-Henry	6.255	7.79				
13	(Italy) Gian Luca Zodda	6.06	7.88				
14	(Ukraine) Kostiantyn Pavlenko	6.02	8.28				
15	(Ecuador) Carlos Granja	6.03	8.73				
16	(Germany) Linus Bader	6.32	11.09				

=== Women ===
24 women attended the event.

Poland's Aleksandra Mirosław took the win after winning a tight race against the United States' Emma Hunt who took second place. A non-speed-specialist Japan's Miho Nonaka placed third after beating Poland's Patrycja Chudziak in the small final.

Rank	Name	Qual.	1/8	1/4	1/2	Small	Final
1st place, gold medalist(s)	(Poland) Aleksandra Mirosław	7.20	7.83	7.59	7.40		7.38
2nd place, silver medalist(s)	(United States) Emma Hunt	7.52	7.61	7.62	7.77		7.53
3rd place, bronze medalist(s)	(Japan) Miho Nonaka	8.58	8.50	8.20	8.36	8.95	
4	(Poland) Patrycja Chudziak	8.28	8.16	8.18	8.37	10.40	
5	(France) Anouck Jaubert	8.49	8.16	7.78			
6	(Poland) Natalia Kalucka	7.68	9.59	8.48			
7	(Austria) Alexandra Elmer	8.54	9.00	8.63			
8	(France) Capucine Viglione	7.94	7.87	10.58			
9	(Germany) Franziska Ritter	8.33	8.52				
10	(United States) Callie Close	8.72	8.70				
11	(Ukraine) Tetiana Kolkotina	8.68	8.95				
12	(United States) Brooke Raboutou	9.36	9.55				
13	(Japan) Akiyo Noguchi	9.12	10.20				
14	(United States) Kyra Condie	8.43	10.82				
15	(Slovenia) Janja Garnbret	8.36	14.47				
16	(Austria) Laura Stöckler	8.77	14.94				

== Villars, Switzerland (July, 1–3) ==
=== Men ===
51 men attended the event.

Indonesia's Veddriq Leonardo claimed his second consecutive win after beating Russia's Dmitrii Timofeev in the final race. Leonardo's teammate, Kiromal Katibin placed third after beating Russia's Vladislav Deulin in the small final.

Rank	Name	Qual.	1/8	1/4	1/2	Small	Final
1st place, gold medalist(s)	(Indonesia) Veddriq Leonardo	5.52	5.50	5.42	5.35		5.32
2nd place, silver medalist(s)	(Russia) Dmitrii Timofeev	5.622	6.05	5.64	5.48		7.35
3rd place, bronze medalist(s)	(Indonesia) Kiromal Katibin	5.48	5.35	5.31	6.07	5.30	
4	(Russia) Vladislav Deulin	5.756	5.67	5.62	5.51	5.38	
5	(Iran) Mehdi Alipour Shenazandifard	5.734	6.78	5.68			
6	(Russia) Aleksandr Shikov	5.67	6.07	5.72			
7	(Indonesia) Alfian Muhammad Fajri	5.724	5.60	6.13			
8	(Kazakhstan) Rishat Khaibullin	5.728	5.53	7.73			
9	(Indonesia) Aspar Jaelolo	5.726	5.72				
10	(Russia) Sergey Rukin	5.77	5.78				
11	(Poland) Marcin Dzieński	5.71	5.80				
12	(Iran) Reza Alipour Shenazandifard	5.54	5.81				
13	(United States) John Brosler	5.757	6.11				
14	(United States) Noah Bratschi	5.739	6.36				
15	(Russia) Lev Rudatskiy	5.625	7.91				
16	(Italy) Gian Luca Zodda	5.729	9.90				

=== Women ===
40 women attended the event.

Russia's Ekaterina Barashchuk took her first World Cup gold medal after outracing her teammate and current world record holder Iuliia Kaplina in the final race. Poland's Patrycja Chudziak took third place after beating Indonesia's Desak Made Rita Kusuma Dewi in the small final.

Rank	Name	Qual.	1/8	1/4	1/2	Small	Final
1st place, gold medalist(s)	(Russia) Ekaterina Barashchuk	7.61	7.59	7.28	7.30		7.30
2nd place, silver medalist(s)	(Russia) Iuliia Kaplina	7.01	7.31	7.17	7.17		8.39
3rd place, bronze medalist(s)	(Poland) Patrycja Chudziak	7.56	7.60	7.42	7.50	7.73	
4	(Indonesia) Desak Made Rita Kusuma Dewi	7.34	7.33	7.02	fall	10.38	
5	(United States) Emma Hunt	7.72	7.43	7.19			
6	(Poland) Natalia Kalucka	7.28	8.29	7.47			
7	(France) Anouck Jaubert	7.49	wildcard	7.52			
8	(Indonesia) Rajiah Sallsabillah	7.24	7.19	fall			
9	(Poland) Anna Brozek	7.84	7.61				
10	(France) Capucine Viglione	8.00	7.68				
11	(Italy) Giulia Randi	7.912	7.87				
12	(France) Manon Lebon	8.14	8.00				
13	(Slovenia) Janja Garnbret	7.916	8.01				
14	(Austria) Laura Stöckler	8.07	8.57				
15	(Russia) Elena Timofeeva	8.17	10.47				
16	(Indonesia) Nurul Iqamah	7.918	FS				
