= Lover's Leap (Tahoe, California) =

Mountain in the United States of America

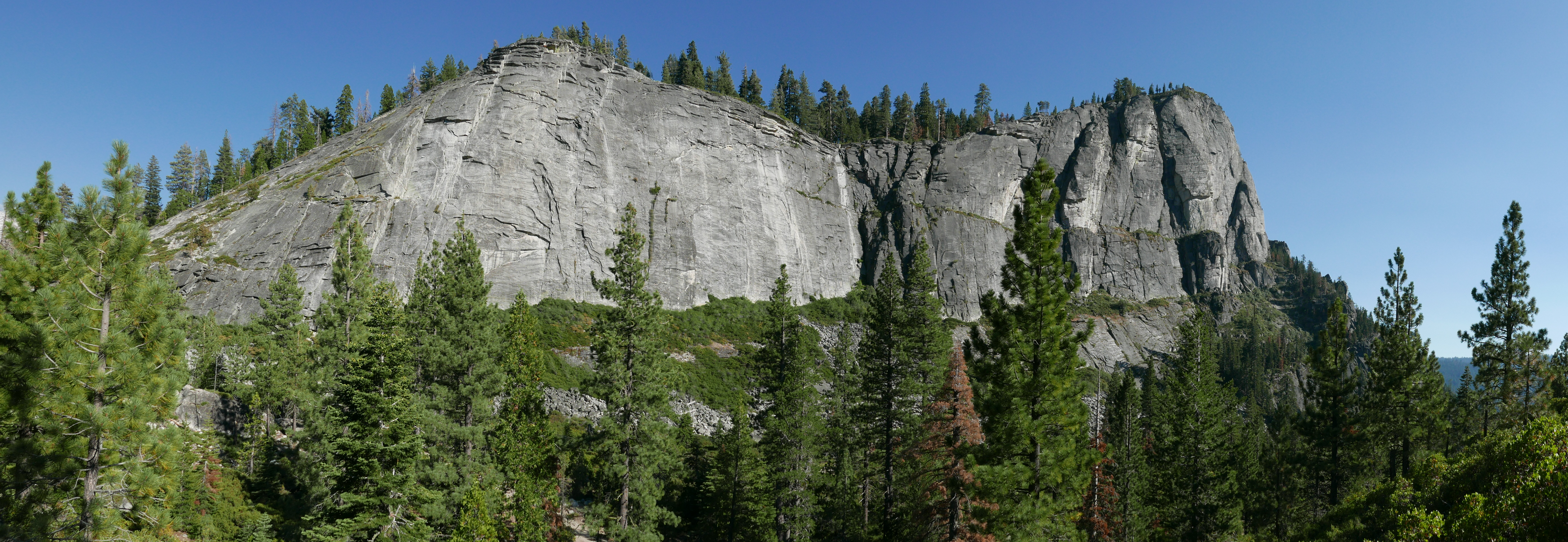
- Lover's Leap seen from the Pony Express Trail.

Highest point
- Elevation: 6,944 ft (2,117 m) NAVD 88
- Coordinates: 38°47′58″N 120°08′08″W

Geography
- Location within California
- Location: El Dorado County, California, United States
- Parent range: Sierra Nevada
- Topo map: USGS Pyramid Peak

Climbing
- Easiest route: Hike
- Interactive map of Lover's Leap climbing area
- Type of climbing: traditional crag
- Height range: Up to 600 feet (180 m)
- Pitches range: 4
- Technical grades: 5.5 to 5.12d, VB to V6
- NCCS grades: I and II
- Rock type: granite
- Quantity of routes: weeks worth
- Climbing area developed: well developed
- Cliff aspect: north
- Season: spring to fall
- Ownership: Eldorado National Forest
- Camping: Lovers Leap Campground
- Classic climbs: Bear's Reach (5.7); Corrugation Corner (5.7); Surrealistic Pillar 5.7); Haystack (5.8); Fantasia (5.9 R); The Line (5.9); Traveler Buttress (5.9); Hospital Corner (5.10a); Tombstone Terror (5.10c); Boothill (5.11a); Nirvana (5.11c); R.I.P. (5.11d); Dog Party (5.12b); Fight the Power (5.12b/c)
- Stars: 4/5 stars

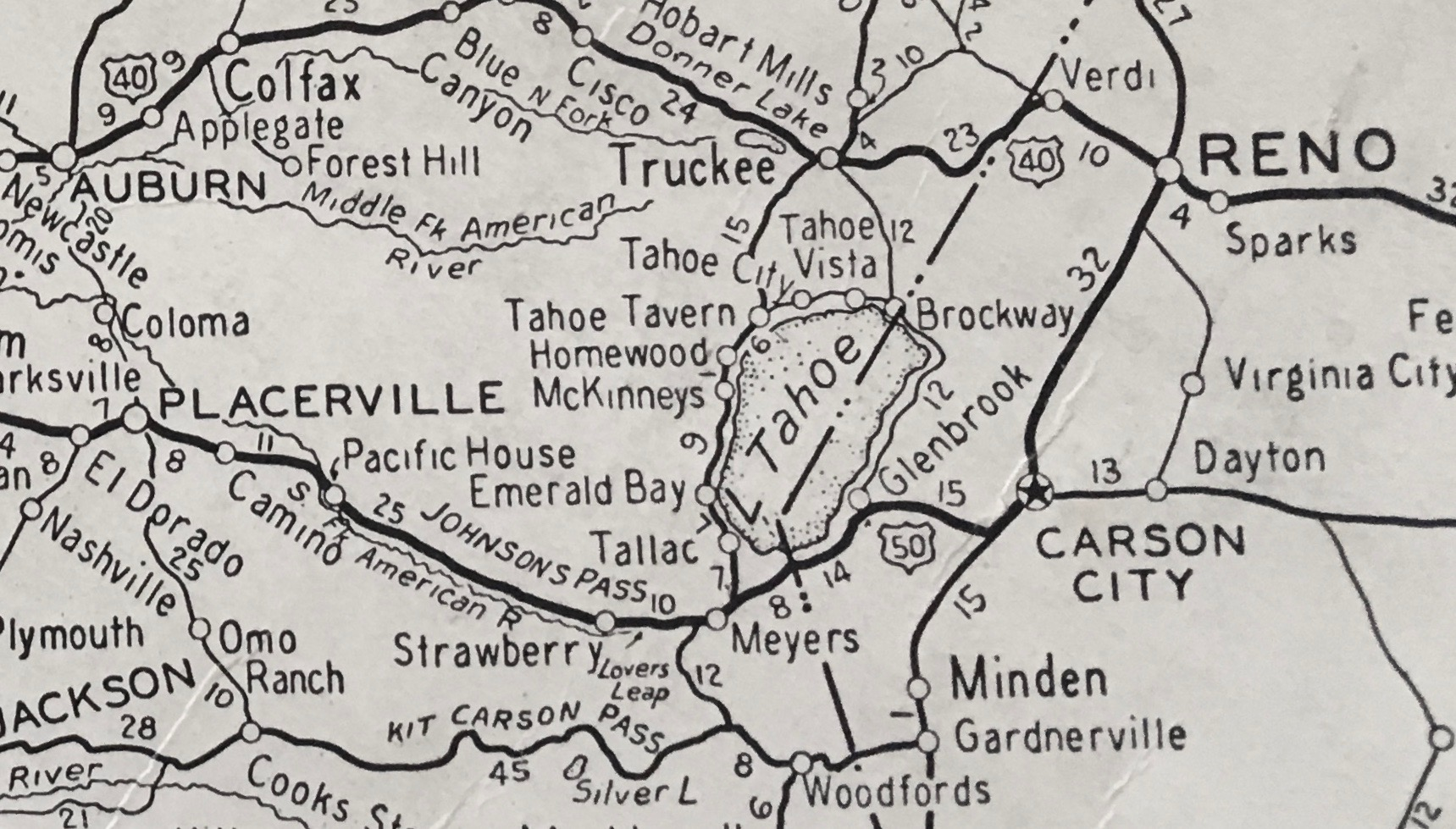
Lover's Leap in 1937 located on US 50 east of Strawberry

Lover's Leap is a steep granite cliff band in El Dorado County, California, United States, a landmark which catches the eye as one travels by, and a popular destination for climbers. The origin of its name is unknown, but common to most Lover's Leaps, one version from local folklore says two Native Americans lovers leapt to their deaths from the summit.

== Geography ==
The cliffs of Lover's Leap run horizontally through the Eldorado National Forest for over one-third of a mile (0.54 km), with heights between 250 and 600 feet (76 and 183 m). The formation faces towards the northwest, and lie just south of Route 50, between Lake Tahoe and Sacramento. The historic Pony Express trail roughly parallels Route 50, and runs directly beneath Lover's Leap. The closest major urban center is the Tahoe area about 10 miles to the northeast. The cliff is at the northern terminus of a sloping ridge that runs southwest for six miles to the peak of Little Round Top. The Forest Service operates the nearby Lover's Leap Campground, and the historic Strawberry Lodge is also nearby.

== Climbing ==
Lover's Leap is a popular climbing destination with over one hundred and fifty established routes. It is best known for its traditional multi-pitch routes, often using granite dikes for holds; but the area also includes some boulder problems.

Bruce Cooke established the first recorded climbing route here, a chimney in the middle of the wall, around 1950. A handful of routes were put in the following decade by local climbers (some with the Sierra Club) from the Sacramento Valley and the Bay Area. Routes established in this early period included future classics Corrugation Corner, and Bear's Reach, a route made famous half a century later by a viral video in which Dan Osman speed climbed it.

The 'Leap gained its current climbing popularity during the 1960s and 1970s, a period during which the first ascents of most notable new lines were done. Traveler Buttress, featured in Fifty Classic Climbs of North America, was put up in 1966. Well-known climber Royal Robbins moved to the area from Yosemite during the 1970s, and opened the first climbing school at Lover's Leap.

In 2003, Marc "Petch" Pietrolungo, a long time climbing local at Lover's Leap, started Lover's Leap Guides. Soon becoming the premier and now longest rock climbing guide service to the guide at Lover's Leap. Some popular routes at Lover's Leap today are:

Route name	Difficulty
Knapsack Crack	5.5
Deception	5.6
Harvey's Wallbangers, Center	5.6
Pop Bottle	5.7
Surrealistic Pillar	5.7
East Wall	5.7
Corrugation Corner	5.7
Bear's Reach	5.7
Haystack	5.8
East Crack	5.8
The Line	5.9
Traveler Buttress	5.9
Scimitar	5.9R
Eagle's Buttress, Right	5.10a

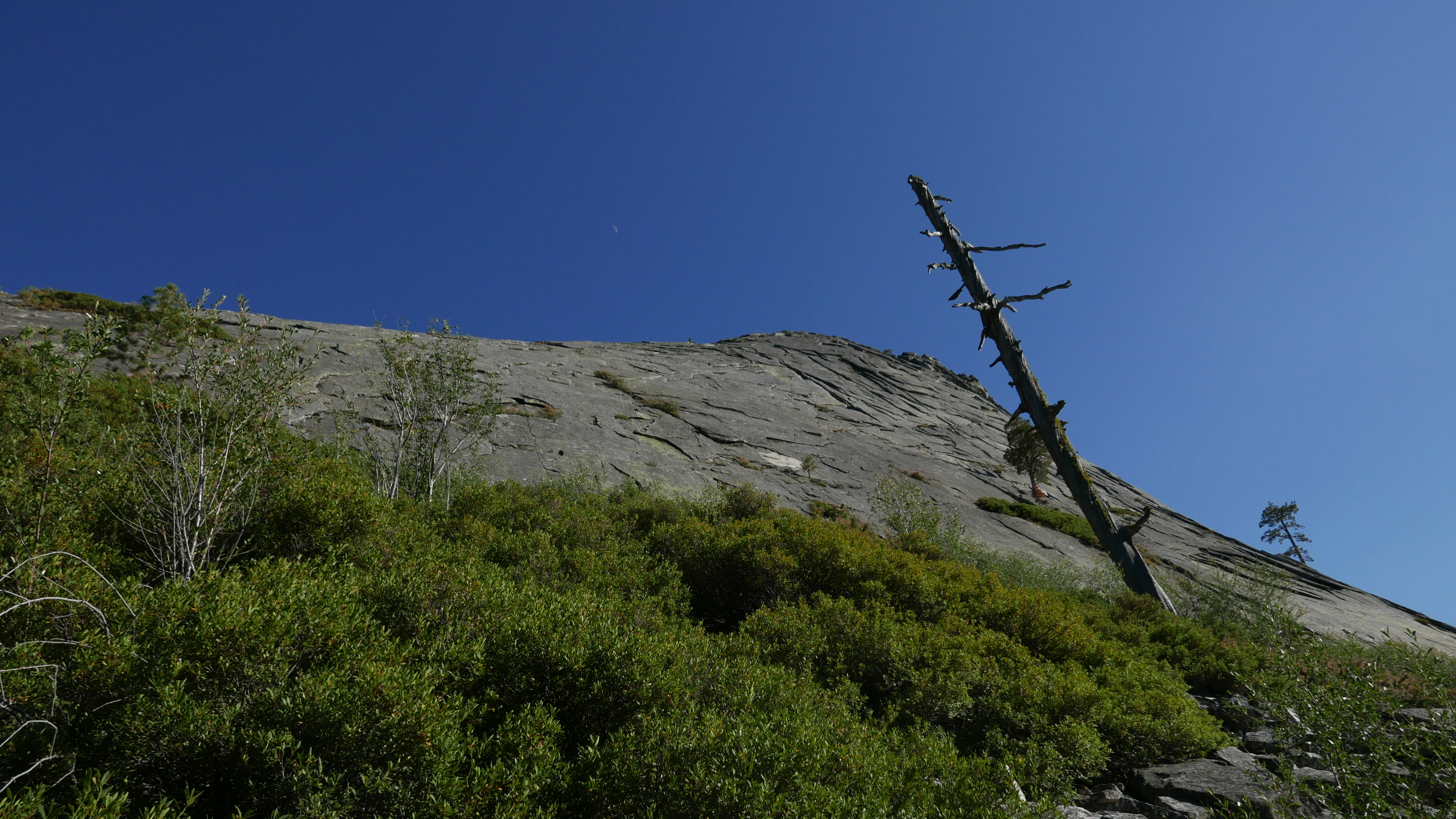
Hogsback climbing area located at Lovers Leap.
