= Lost Arrow Spire =

Detached pillar in Yosemite

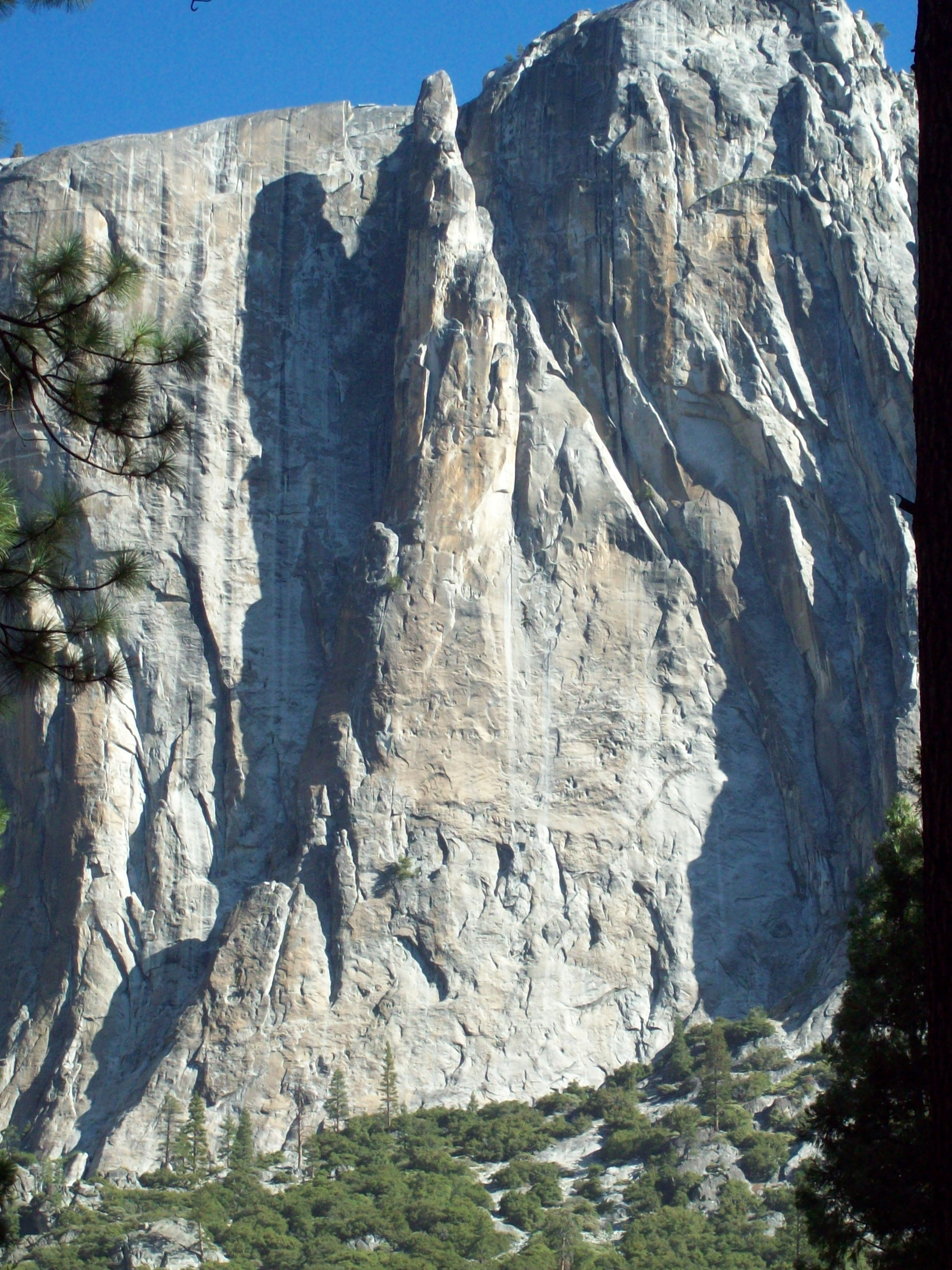

Highest point
- Elevation: 6,930 ft (2,110 m)
- Coordinates: 37.75600°N 119.593°W

Geography
- Location within California Location within the United States
- Location: Yosemite National Park
- Parent range: Sierra Nevada

Geology
- Rock age: Cretaceous
- Mountain type: granite rock

Lost Arrow Spire is a detached pillar in Yosemite National Park, in Yosemite Valley, California, located immediately adjacent to Upper Yosemite Falls. The structure includes the Lost Arrow Spire Chimney route which is recognized in the historic climbing text Fifty Classic Climbs of North America. The spire is the location for a dramatic and famous Tyrolean traverse, which has since become an equally notable slackline.

== Climbing ==
In 1946, the spire was first summited by lassoing the tip from the main valley rim wall, 125-feet away, after which 29-year old Ax Nelson prusiked the lassoed line to the peak, followed by Jack Arnold. Steve Roper called it "one of the greatest rope stunts ever pulled off in climbing history", climbers did not recognize it as a true rock climbing ascent with Nelson saying: "Spectacular and effective though [it] was, this maneuver required very little real climbing".

That same year, 48-year old Swiss immigrant, John Salathé, had also been attempting the spire and had invented a major improvement to the climbing piton using the alloy used for the Ford Model A axle, which would be able to endure the compact granite of Yosemite without buckling (called Lost Arrows).

=== Lost Arrow Spire Chimney ===
Lost Arrow Spire Chimney
- Location: California, USA
- Coordinates: 37.75600°N 119.593°W
- Climbing area: Yosemite Valley
- Route type: Aid, Traditional
- Vertical gain: 1,400 feet
- Pitches: 10
- Technical grade: 5.5 A3 or 5.10 A2
- First ascent: Salathé, Nelson, 1947.
- First free ascent: Jerry Moffatt, 1985.

In 1947, Ax Nelson and John Salathé joined forces, and using Salathé's new pitons, made the true first ascent via the Lost Arrow Spire Chimney (5.5 A3 or 5.10 A2), a route that combined both traditional climbing and aid climbing techniques, and took the pair 5 days.

The route is listed in Fifty Classic Climbs of North America and is considered a classic. Climbing historian Steve Roper called the ascent, "a true Valley milestone: the first big-wall climb ever done in the United States - and without a doubt the beginning of the Golden Age of Yosemite climbing".

In June 1985, Jerry Moffatt did the first free ascent of the Lost Arrow Spire Chimney with Ron Kauk, as a live television event with an audience of over 30 million for ABC's Wide World of Sports.

In 2020, a six-year-old child named Sam Baker climbed the spire alongside his father.

=== Lost Arrow Spire Tip ===
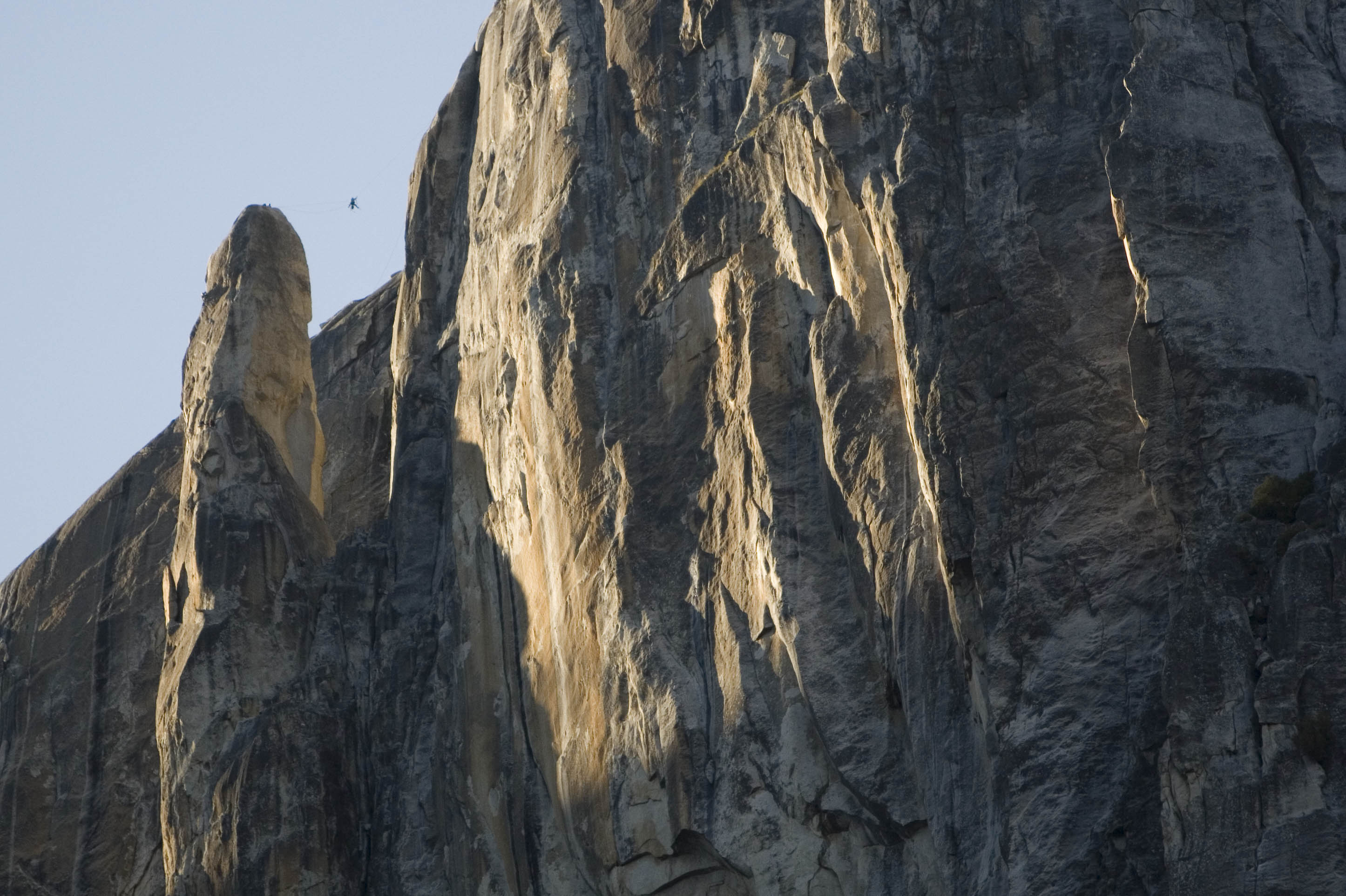
Tyrolean traverse from the spire

The last two pitches of Lost Arrow Spire Chimney are called the Lost Arrow Spire Tip (5.12b or 5.7 C2) and complete the detached portion of the spire. The first free ascent of the Tip was in 1984 by a team led by Dave Shultz. The Tip route is often reached by rappelling into an area known as The Notch. Once the route is completed climbers can return to the main wall via a dramatic and famous Tyrolean traverse.

== Slacklining ==
Lost Arrow Spire was to become one of the early hotspots for highlining, the version of slacklining in very high places. The line is typically 17-meters long and is 880-meters above the valley floor, and has a downhill (walking towards the Spire) and an uphill (walking away from the Spire) direction.

The first person to perform a slackline to the Lost Arrow Spire was Scott Balcom on July 13, 1985; he used a safety leash. The first female to perform the feat was Libby Sauter on July 17, 2007; she also used a safety leash.

In 1995, Darrin Carter became the first person to perform a slackline to the Lost Arrow Spire without any safety leash, called a "free solo" slackline, which he did on the downhill version; he was also only the second person after Balcom to complete a Lost Arrow Spire slackline. In 2003, Dean Potter became the first person to perform a "free solo" slackline in both downhill and uphill directions; Potter was only the second person to complete a "free solo" Lost Arrow Spire slackline after Carter.

== See also ==
- Separate Reality, an iconic free soloing route in Yosemite
- The Nose (El Capitan), a 5.14a (8b+) route in Yosemite
- Salathé Wall, a 5.13 (7c+) route in Yosemite
