= Corrugation Corner =

Traditional climbing route at Lover's Leap, Lake Tahoe

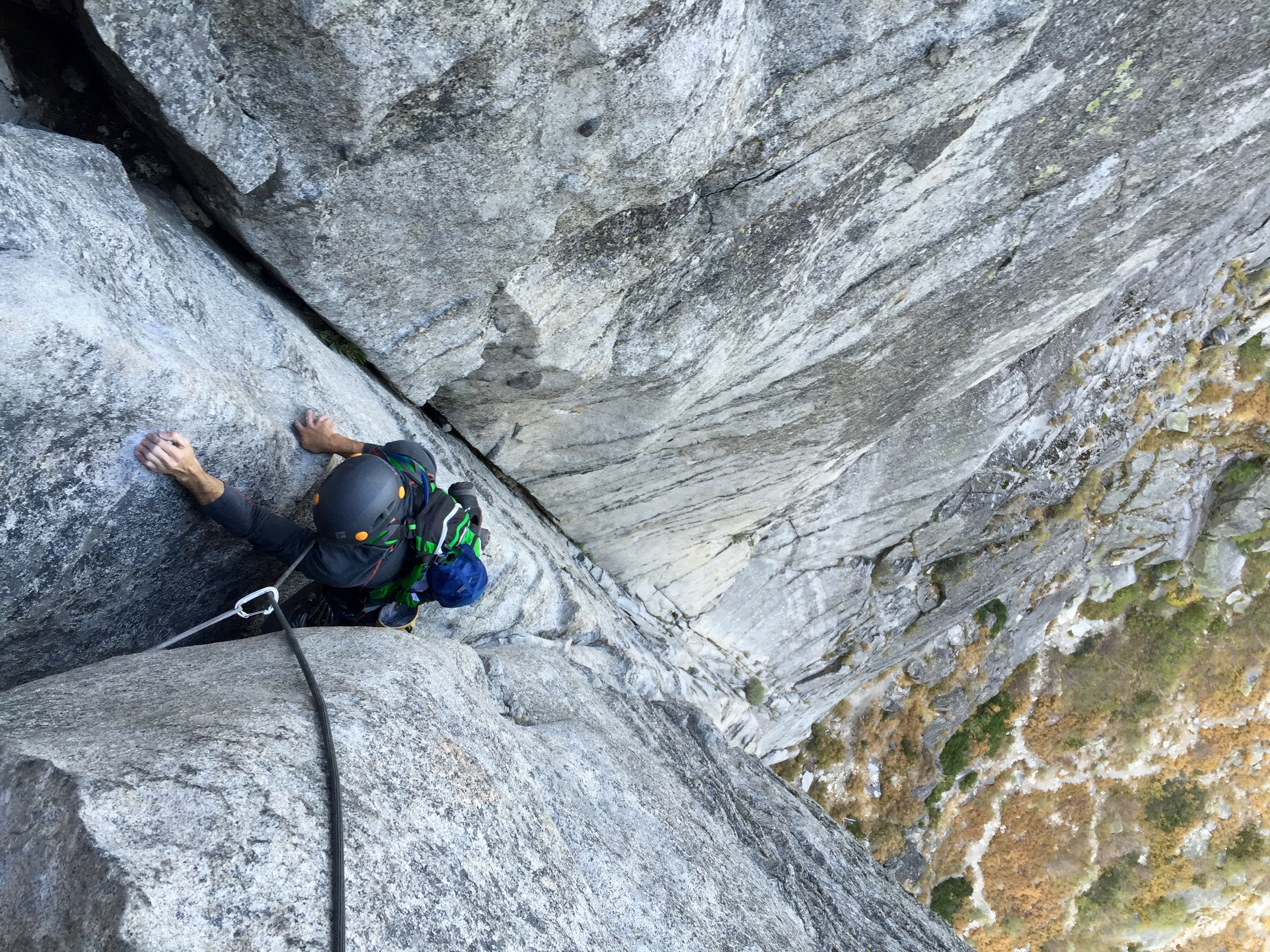
- Seconding Corrugation Corner
- Location: Lake Tahoe, California, United States
- Coordinates: 38.79940°N 120.135°W
- Climbing area: Lover's Leap, Main Ledge
- Route type: Trad
- Vertical gain: 500 feet (150 m)
- Pitches: 3
- Technical grade: 5.7
- First ascent: Kurt Edsburg, et al., early 1960s.

Corrugation Corner is a technical rock climb at Lover's Leap near Lake Tahoe, CA first established in the 1960s. It is recognized for its high level of exposure as well as its pleasing aesthetics. Chris McNamara describes it as "one of the steepest granite 5.7s anywhere.".

== Route description ==
- Pitch 1: The climb ascends a large corner before continuing past a ceiling and into a second corner.
- Pitch 2: It then ascends some cracks leading into a chimney, before traversing right onto a ledge.
- Pitch 3: It ascends through another chimney, then traverses past a piton an onto an exposed arete.
