= Traveler Buttress =

Climbing route, California

- Location: Lake Tahoe, California, United States
- Coordinates: 38.79940°N 120.135°W
- Climbing area: Lover's Leap, Main Wall
- Route type: Trad
- Vertical gain: 500
- Pitches: 4
- Technical grade: 5.9
- First ascent: Dick Long & Al Steck, 1965.

The Traveler Buttress is a technical rock climbing on Lover's Leap route near Tahoe, California, USA, and is featured in Fifty Classic Climbs of North America.
