= Tyrolean traverse =

Climbing technique

Examples of Tyrolean traverses

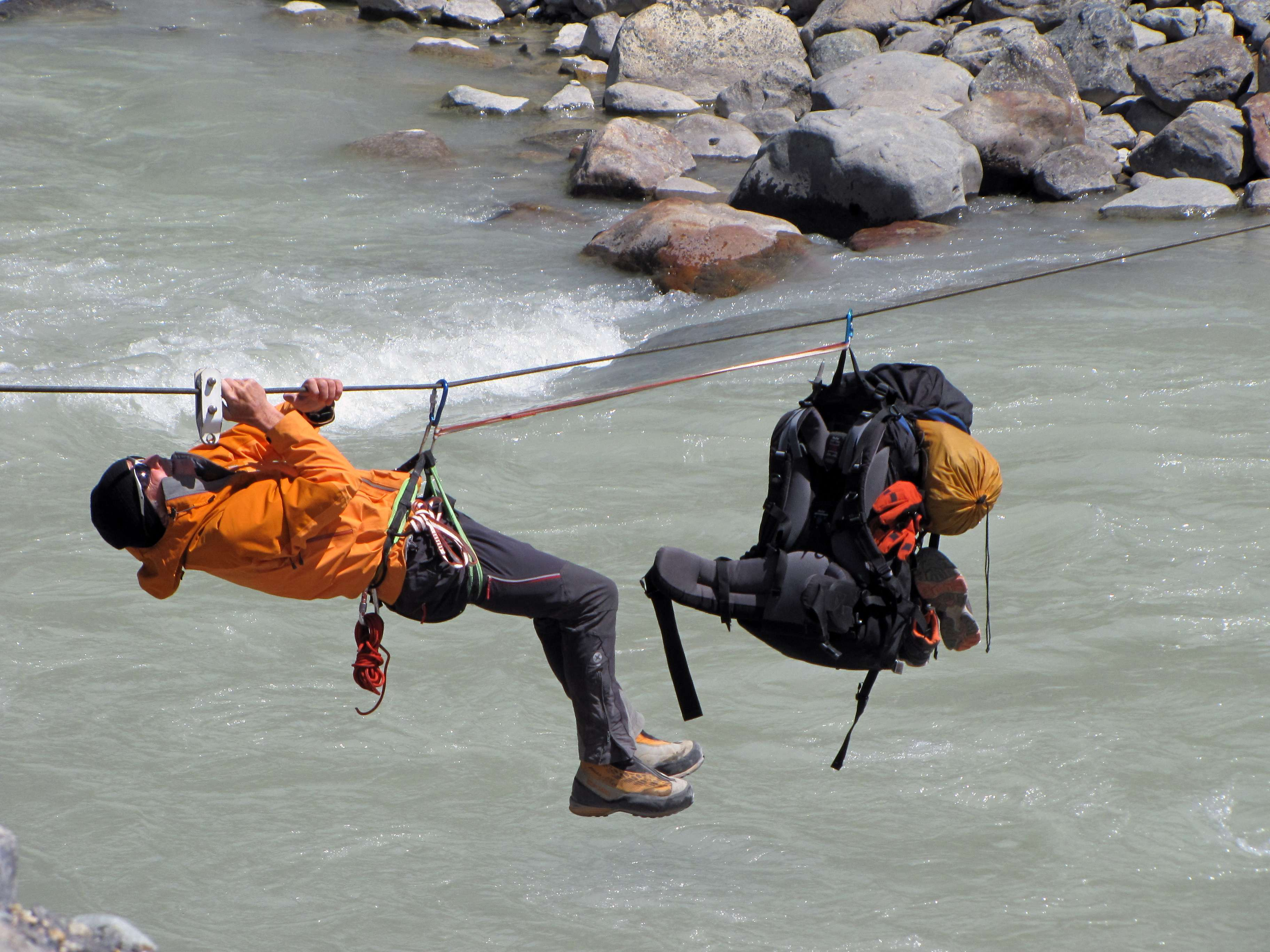
Rio Fitz Roy

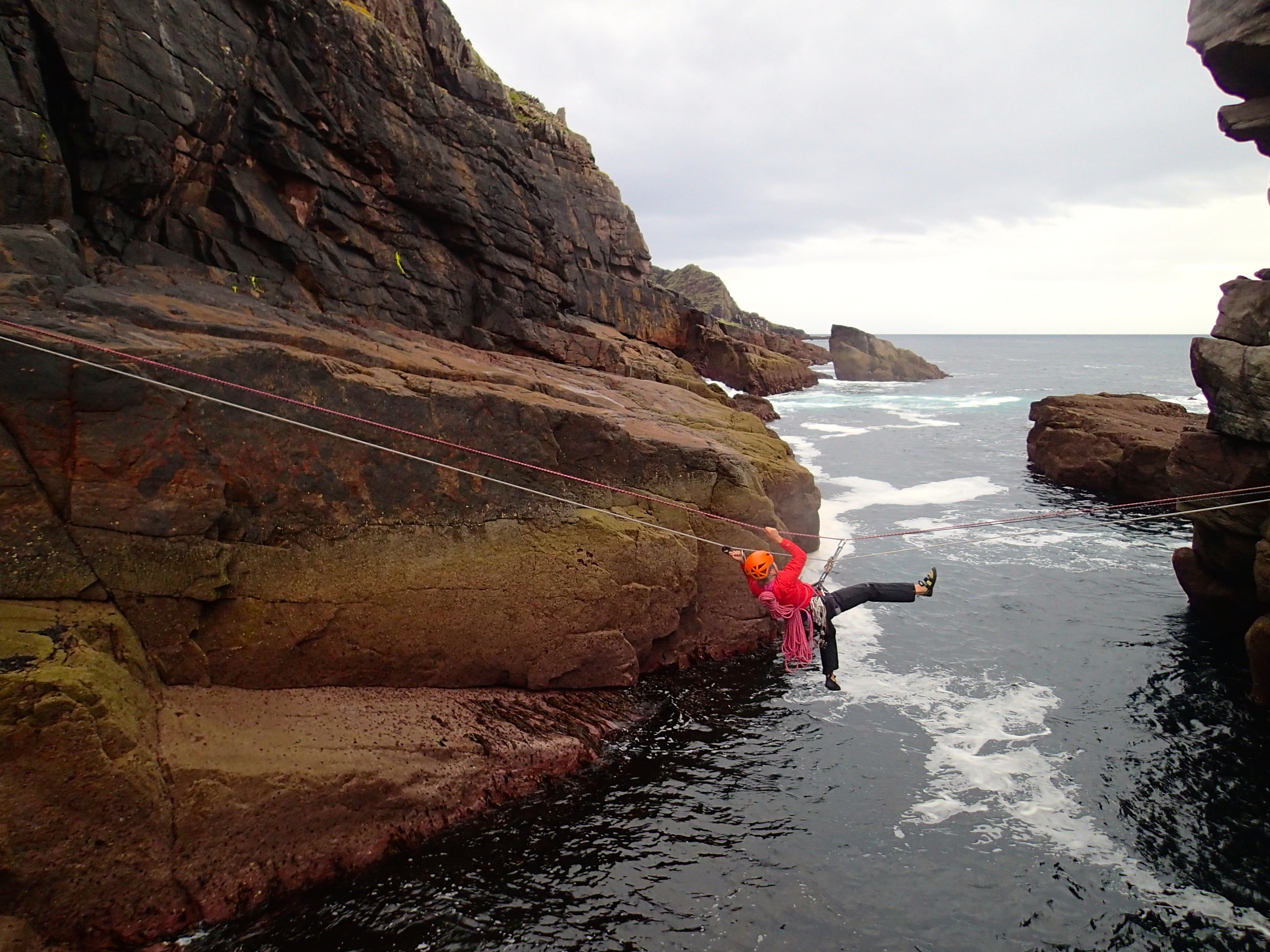
Old Man of Stoer

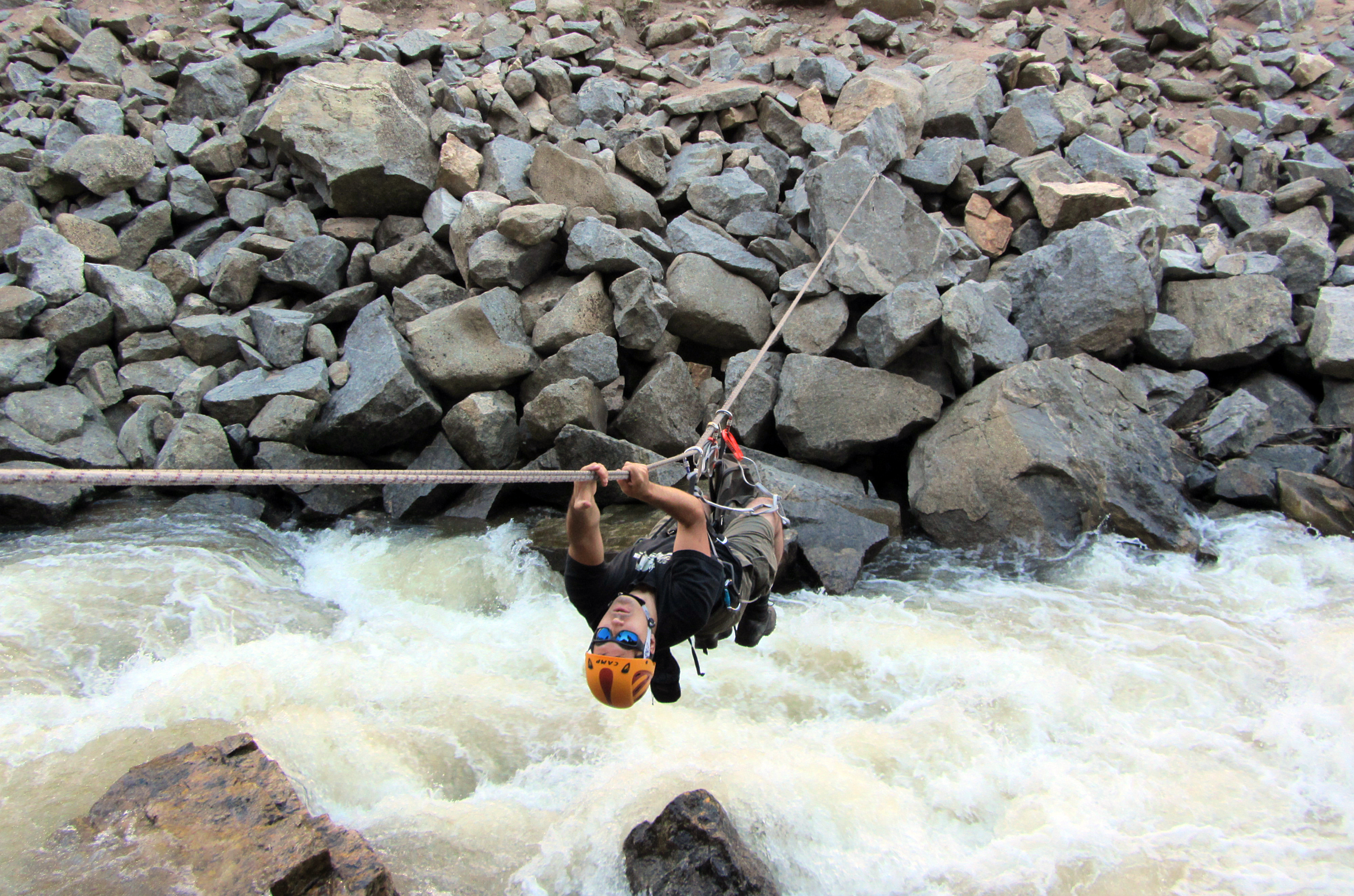
Boulder Canyon

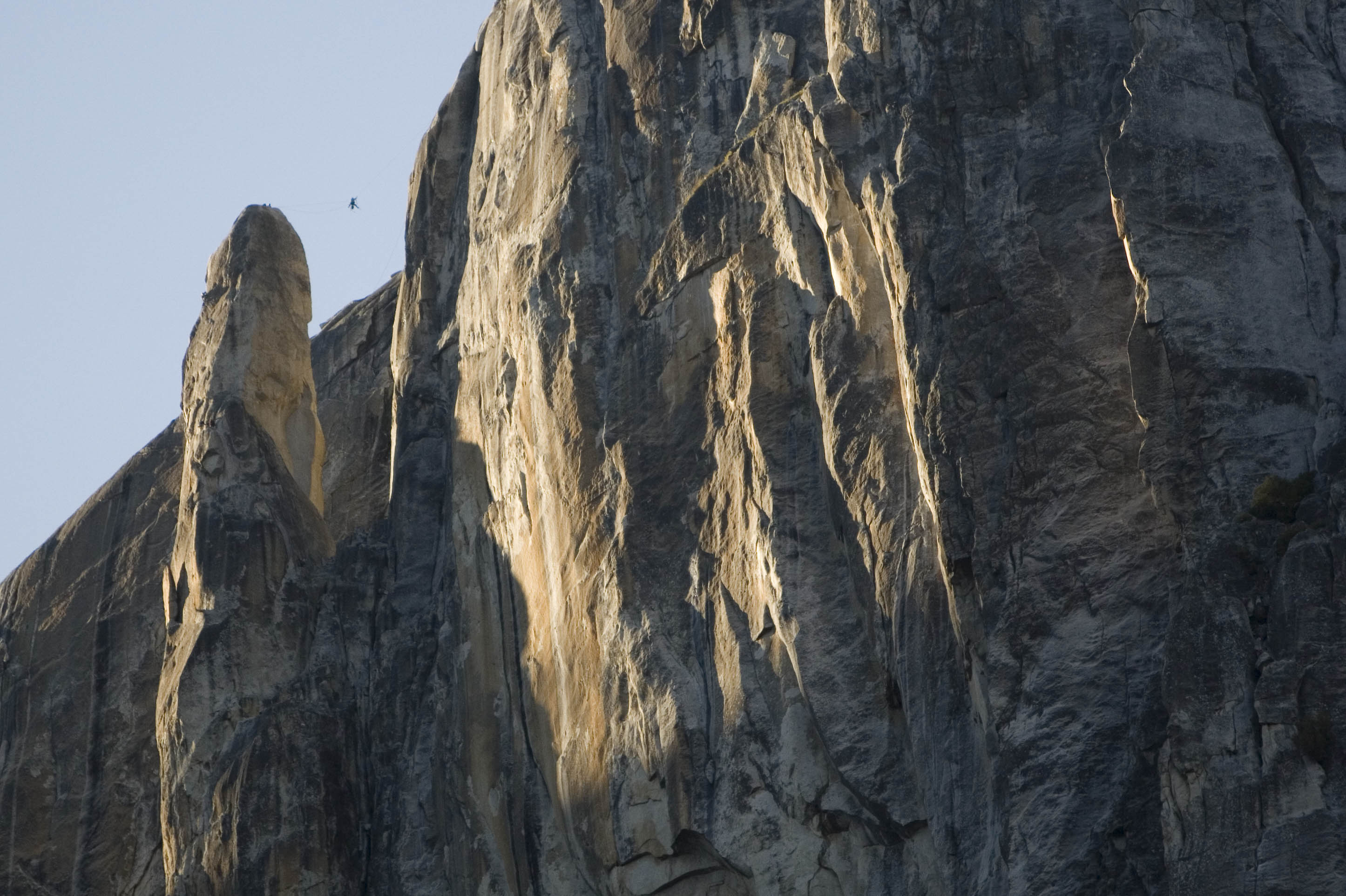
Lost Arrow Spire

In climbing, a Tyrolean traverse is a technique that enables climbers to cross a void between two fixed points, such as between a headland and a detached rock pillar (e.g. a sea stack), or between two points that enable the climbers to cross over an obstacle such as chasm or ravine, or over a fast moving river. Originally developed by Tyrolean mountaineers in the Dolomites in the late 19th to early 20th century, Tyrolean traverses are used in other areas including in caving and in mountain rescue situations.

With a traverse-rope fixed between two anchor points — ideally under some tension — the climber attaches to the rope using a short quickdraw (or equivalent alternative) that is attached to their harness. A backup attachment loop using carabiners and slings is also recommended. Any backpacks are separately clipped to the rope and also clipped to the climber, so they can be dragged across. The climber lies horizontal to the rope with their head facing the direction of travel and moves by pulling hand-over-hand on the rope. Devices such as ascenders can help pull along the rope, pulleys can help reduce friction, and progress capture devices (PCDs) can prevent slippage back along the rope.

Where there is no pre-existing traverse-rope fixed in place, the climbers will have to set one up which typically requires making two strong anchor points and having a static abseiling rope that will need to be more than twice the length of the void between the two anchors so they can retrieve the rope on completing the traverse (or they can tie two ropes together if needed to get to his length). Ideally the two sides are level, however, where the destination is at a much lower level (i.e. it is more akin to a zip line), then the climbers may use a separate abseil rope to control their descent speed. Conversely, if the destination is at a higher level, then the climbers will need devices such as ascenders, aiders, and PCDs to help in hauling themselves up the traverse-rope (i.e. in the manner of 'jumaring' on a fixed rope).

Notable Tyrolean traverses in climbing include the crossing to the Lost Arrow Spire in Yosemite, the crossing to the Old Man of Stoer in Scotland, and the crossing to the Totem Pole in Tasmania. The Guinness World Records lists the longest Tyrolean traverse as being the 1,500-metre (4,900 ft) crossing between the Malyovitsa and Orlovets mountain summits in Bulgaria that was made by Daniel Stefanov in 2008, and the longest Tyrolean traverse over a lava lake being the 100.58-metre (330.0 ft) crossing of Erta Ale in Ethiopia by Karina Oliani in 2017. A fatal accident while conducting a Tyrolean traverse features prominently in the opening scene of the 1993 Sylvester Stallone Hollywood blockbuster film Cliffhanger.

== See also ==
- Fixed rope
- Slacklining
- Traverse (climbing)
- Zip line
