= Corona Arch =

Natural arch in Grand County, Utah, United States

- Rock arch
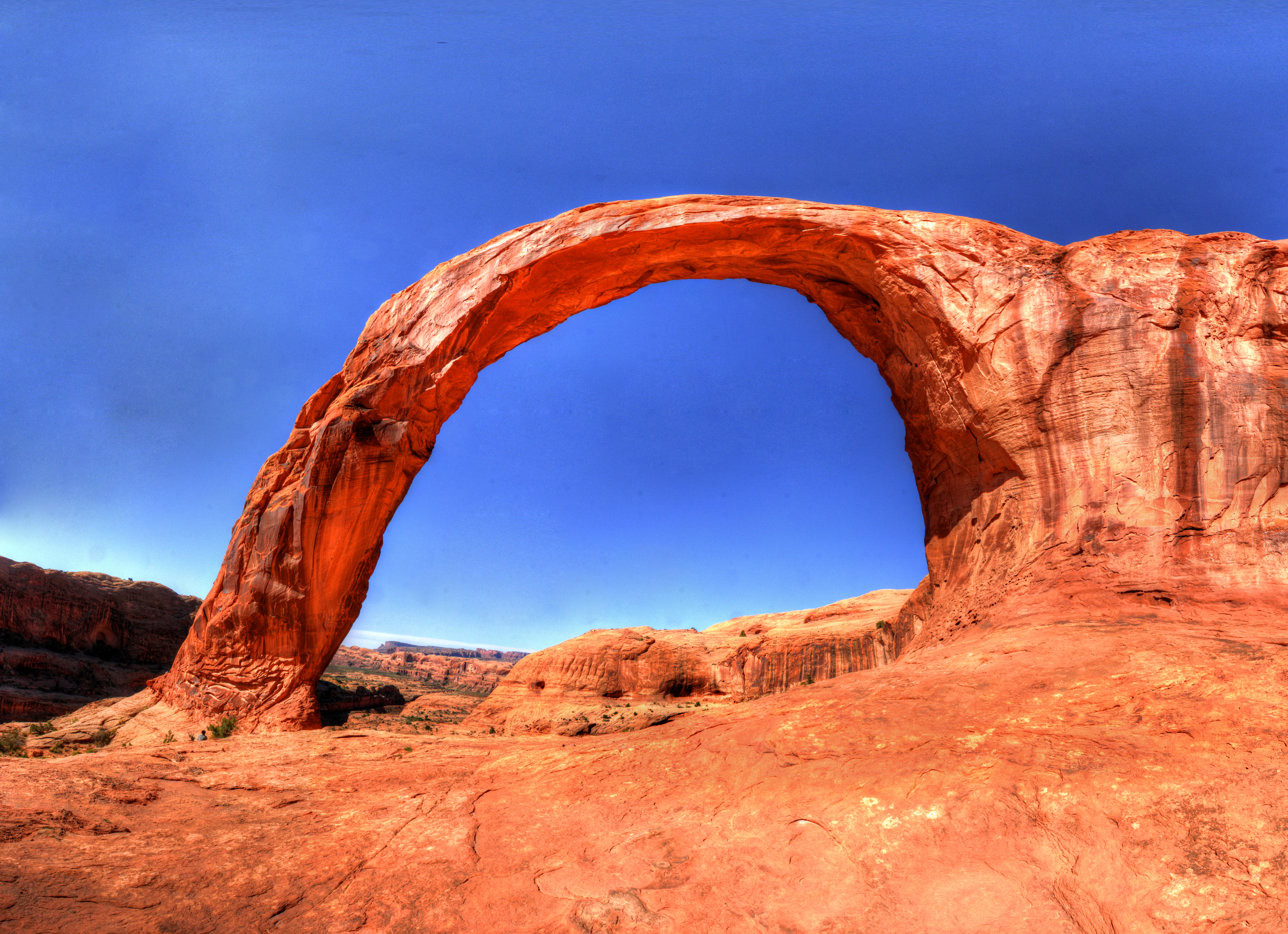
- View of Corona Arch

- Location within Utah Location within the United States
- Coordinates: 38°34′48″N 109°37′12″W
- Location: Grand County, Utah, United States

Dimensions
  - Width: 140 ft (43 m)
  - Height: 105 ft (32 m)
- Elevation: 4,383 ft (1,336 m)

Corona Arch (formerly known as Little Rainbow Bridge) is a natural sandstone arch near Moab, Utah, in a side canyon of the Colorado River west of Moab in Grand County, Utah, United States. It can be accessed via a 1.5-mile (2.4 km) hiking trail (Corona Arch Trail) from Utah State Route 279 (Potash Road). The arch is located within the same rock formation as Pinto Arch and the Bowtie Arch.

== Rope jumping ==
This is the site of a swing shown on some YouTube videos, which is achieved by rope jumping from the apex. Such videos have led to more people jumping from Corona Arch. On March 24, 2013, a man from Utah was killed due to miscalculating the distance to the ground before he swung from the arch. After much discussion, in 2015 a temporary ban was placed on rope-swinging from many arches.

== Site for advocacy ==
In March 2025 an advocacy group who go by "Keep Public Lands in Public Hands" used projectors to display 100-feet high by 40-feet wide images onto Corona arch. the images read "KEEP PUBLIC LANDS IN PUBLIC HANDS" and "FOR SALE YOUR PUBLIC LANDS", inspired by the work of British activist group Led By Donkeys. This was done to oppose the Trump Administration's plan to roll back the Biden-era Public Lands Rule and open protected areas to mineral leases.
