= Speed climbing =

Type of climbing

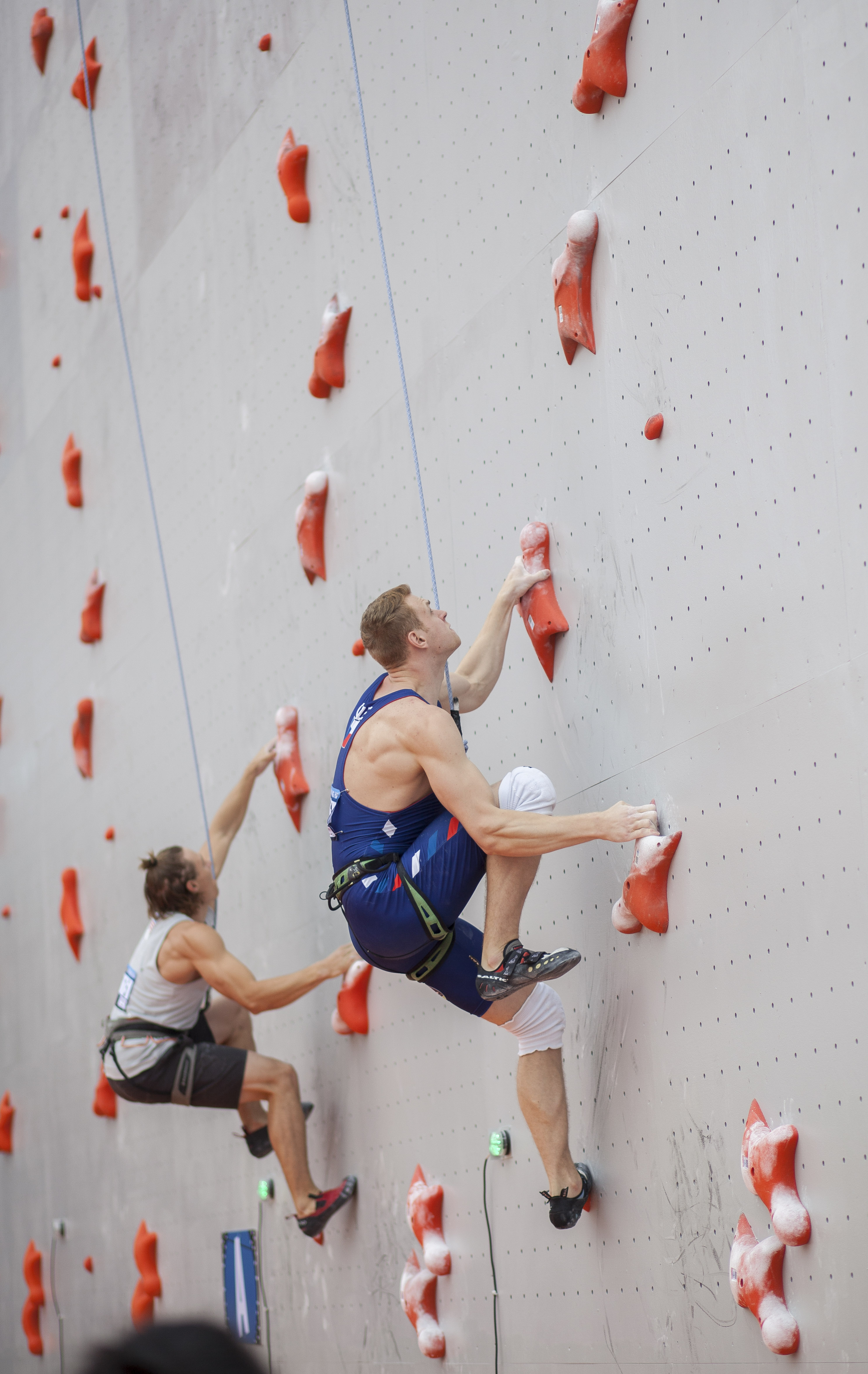
Speed climbing at 2016 Shanghai World Cup

Speed climbing is a climbing discipline in which speed is the ultimate goal. Speed climbing is done on rocks, walls and poles and is only recommended for highly skilled and experienced climbers.

Competition speed climbing, which takes place on an artificial and standardized climbing wall, is the main form of speed climbing. However, there are types of speed climbing that take place outdoors, such as climbing famous big wall climbing routes in the shortest times, notable examples being on El Capitan in Yosemite National Park.

== Competition speed climbing ==
Official competition speed climbing route

Competition speed climbing as governed by the International Federation of Sport Climbing (World Climbing) takes place on 15-metre (49 ft) artificial walls. Competitors climb a 5-degree overhanging IFSC-certified wall, with an auto-belaying system from the top of the wall.

Since 2007 the IFSC has created a standard wall for the world record. The standard has a simple rule and it involves climbers competing on the same route, side by side, and whoever reaches the top first wins. The holds and order are always identical, and the difficulty rating is around F6b (approximately YDS 5.10c), which is a level most recreational climbers could complete. The IFSC also sanctions speed climbing competitions and those events that entail world record attempts. Speed climbing was one of the three climbing modalities included in the combined format at the 2020 Olympic Games in Tokyo, along with lead and bouldering. Beginning at the 2024 Summer Olympics in Paris, speed climbing has been its own standalone competition, separate from the lead and bouldering combined event.

Time is determined by mechanical-electric timing (the competitor leaves the starting pad and strikes a switch at the top of the route). When mechanical-electric timing is used, the climbing time is displayed with an accuracy of one-hundredth of a second. In the rules modifications in 2018, the possibility to use manual timing was removed, and the mechanical-electric timing should record with a precision of 1/1000 second. This precision is only used for ranking in case of a tie. Further, the timing system needs to announce a false start, which is considered a start with less than 0.1 seconds of reaction time after the starting beep.

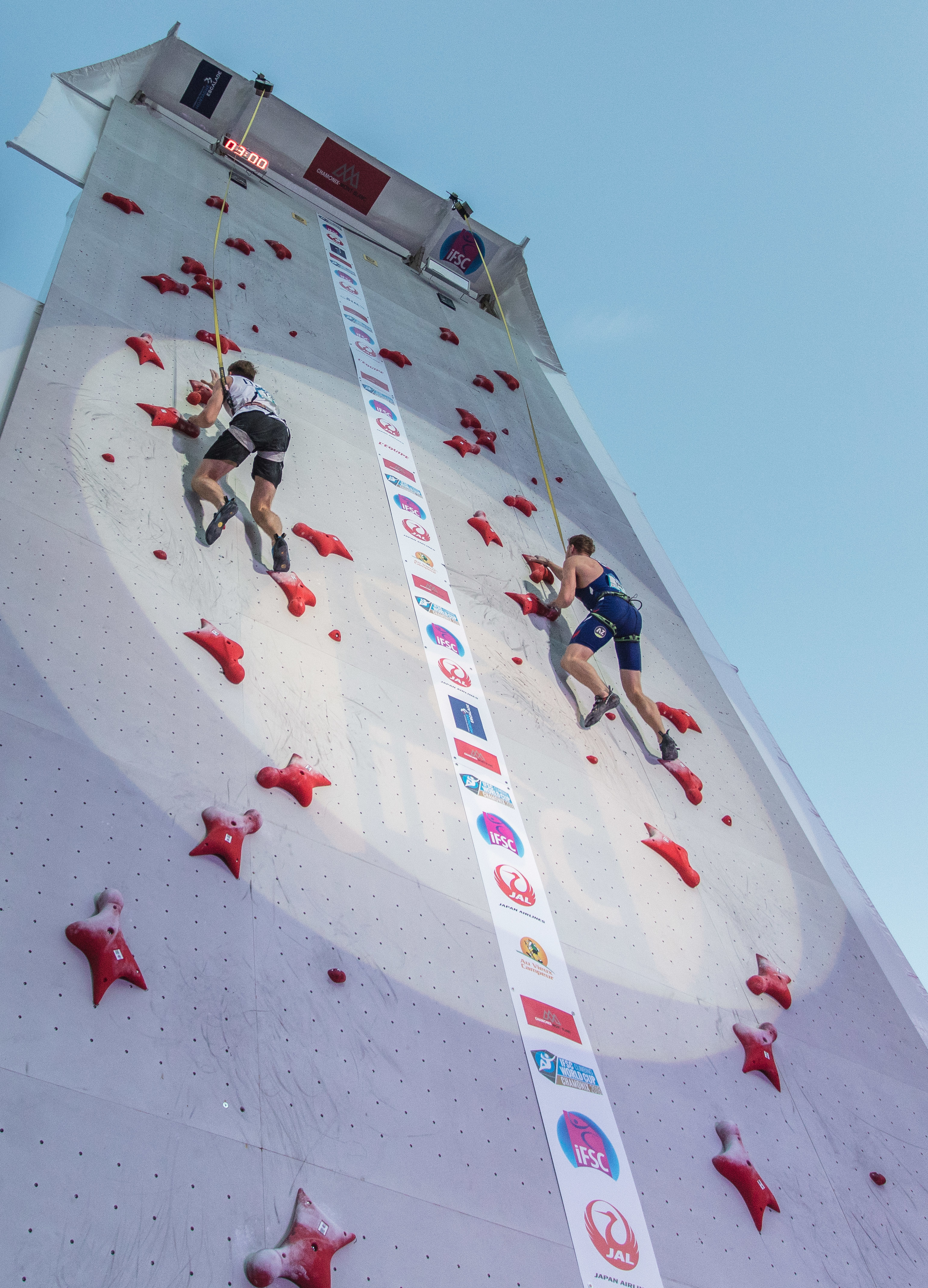
Two climbers compete against each other on the Speed Wall (Chamonix 2018)

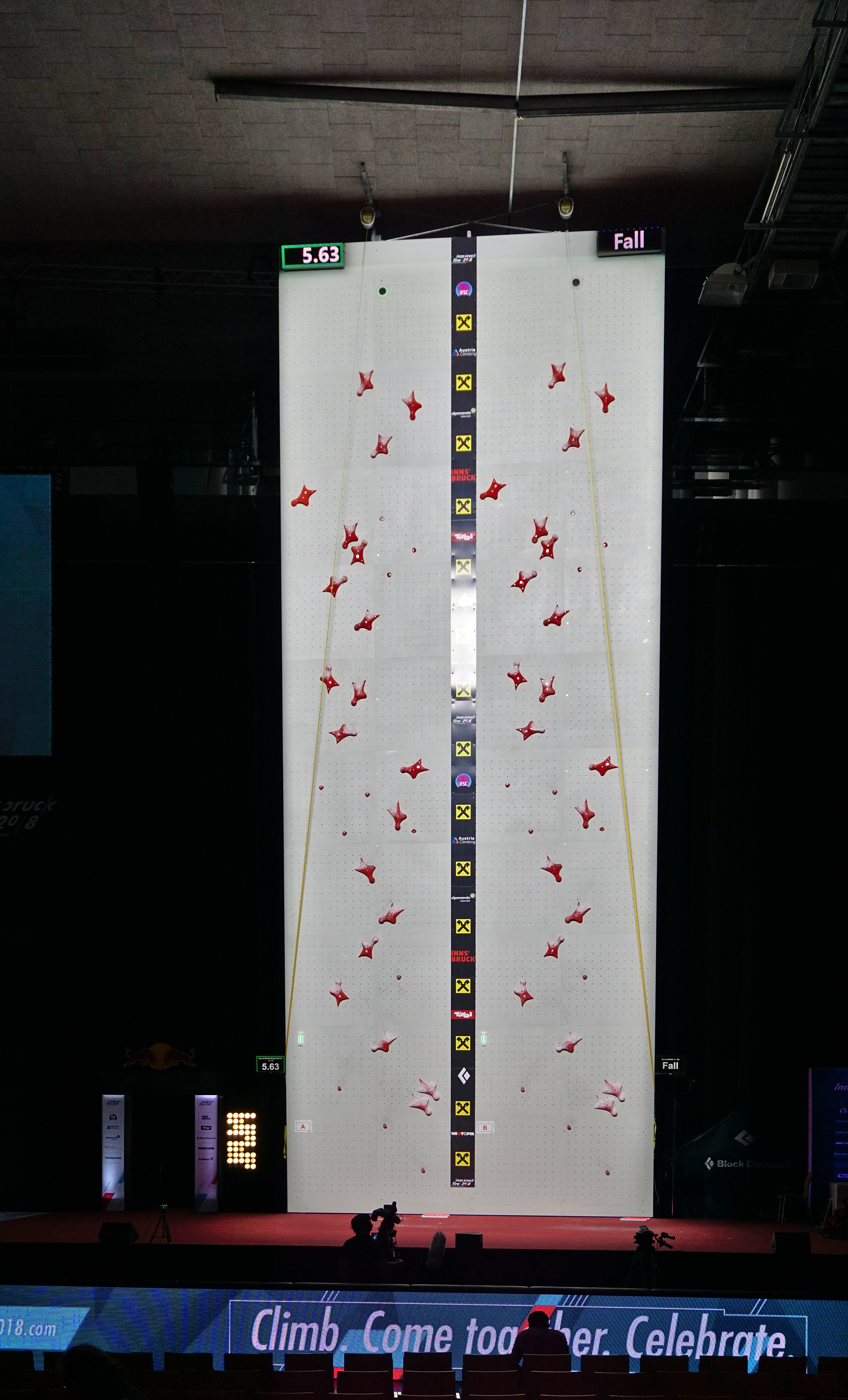
Full view of the standardized Speed Wall

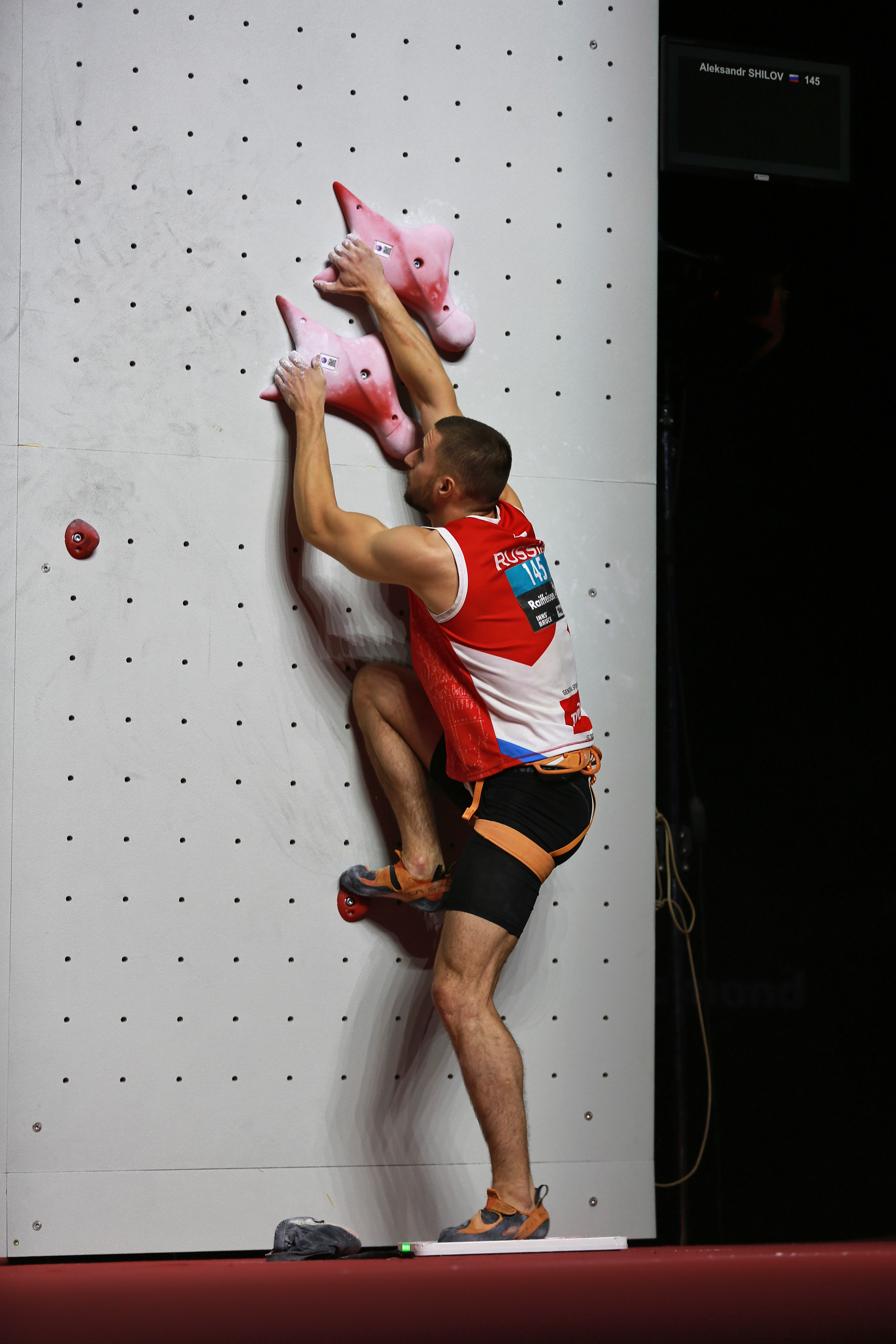
Start position. The climber stands on a pressure plate foot trigger, which is used for detecting false starts.

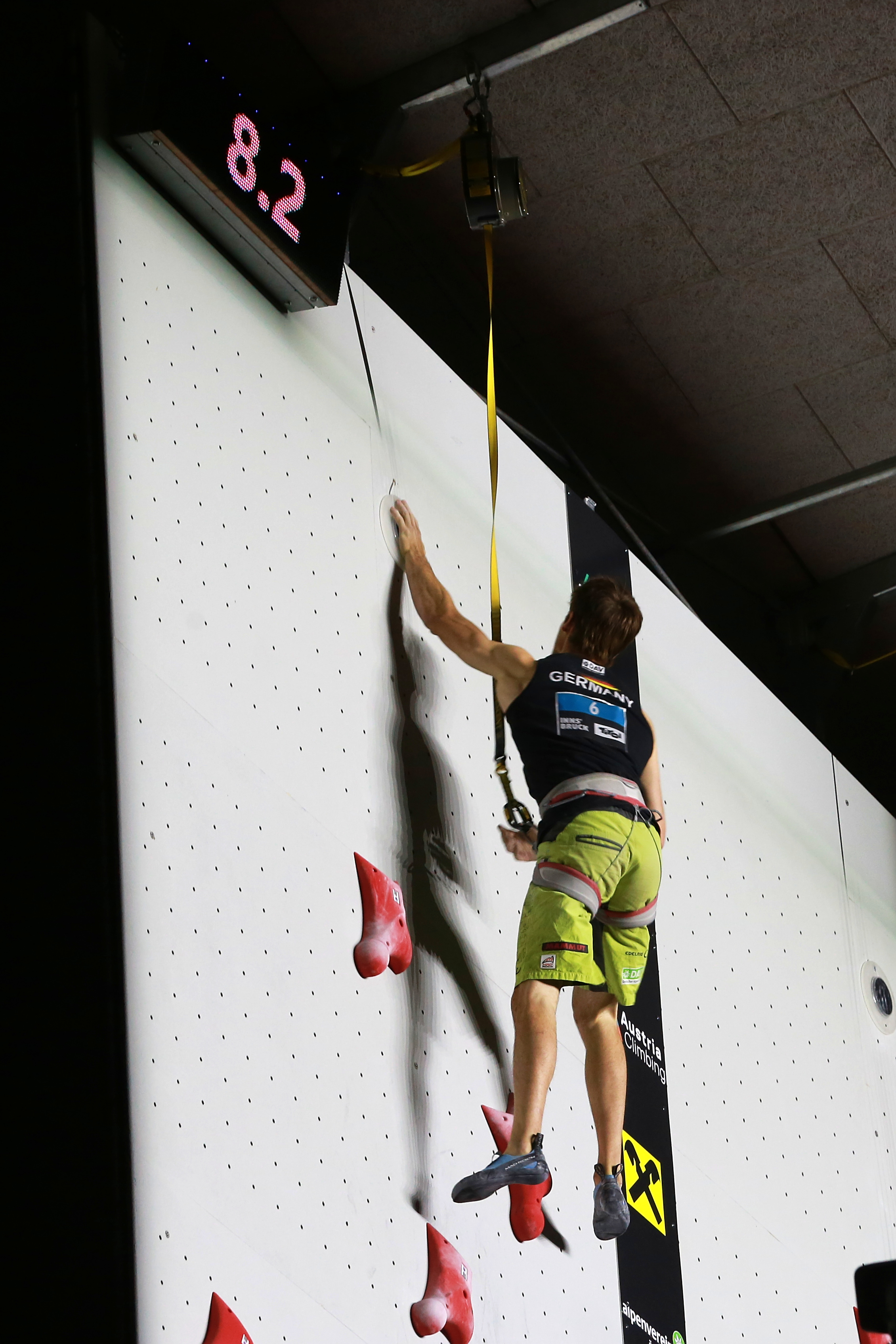
Hitting a button at the top of the wall stops the timer. The climber is secured by an auto-belay device.

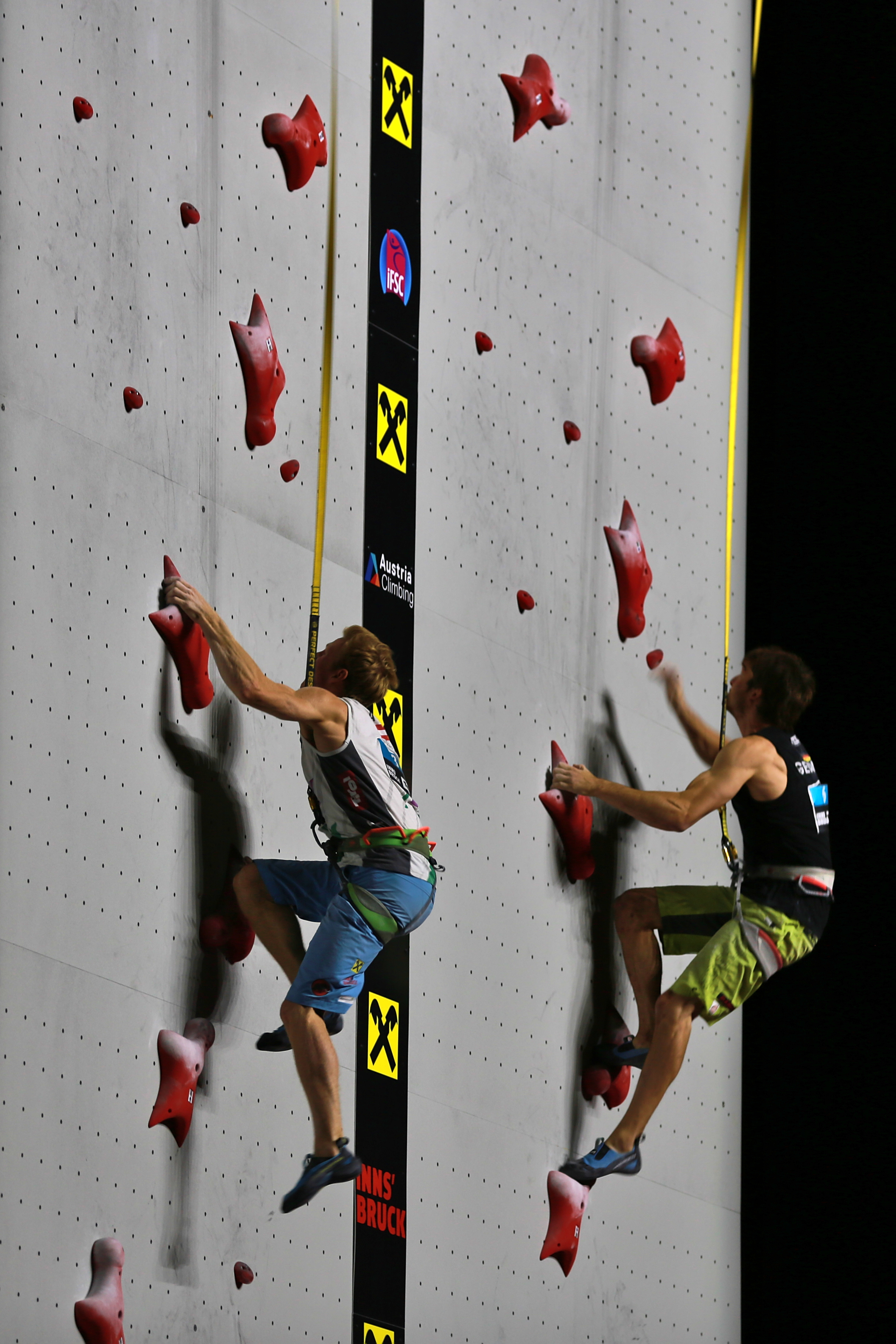
Two competitors in the 2018 Climbing World Championships

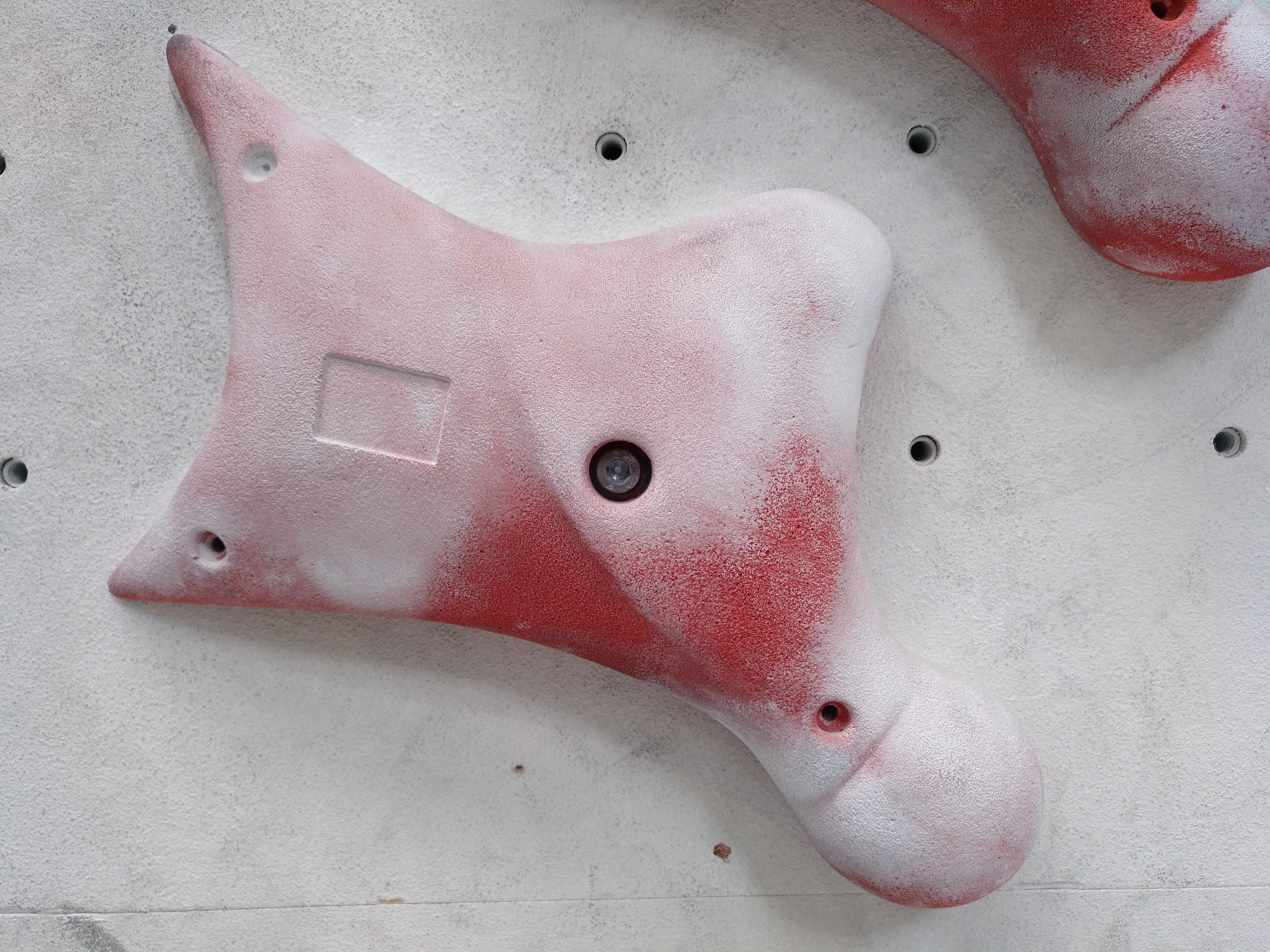
Large standardised speed climbing hold.

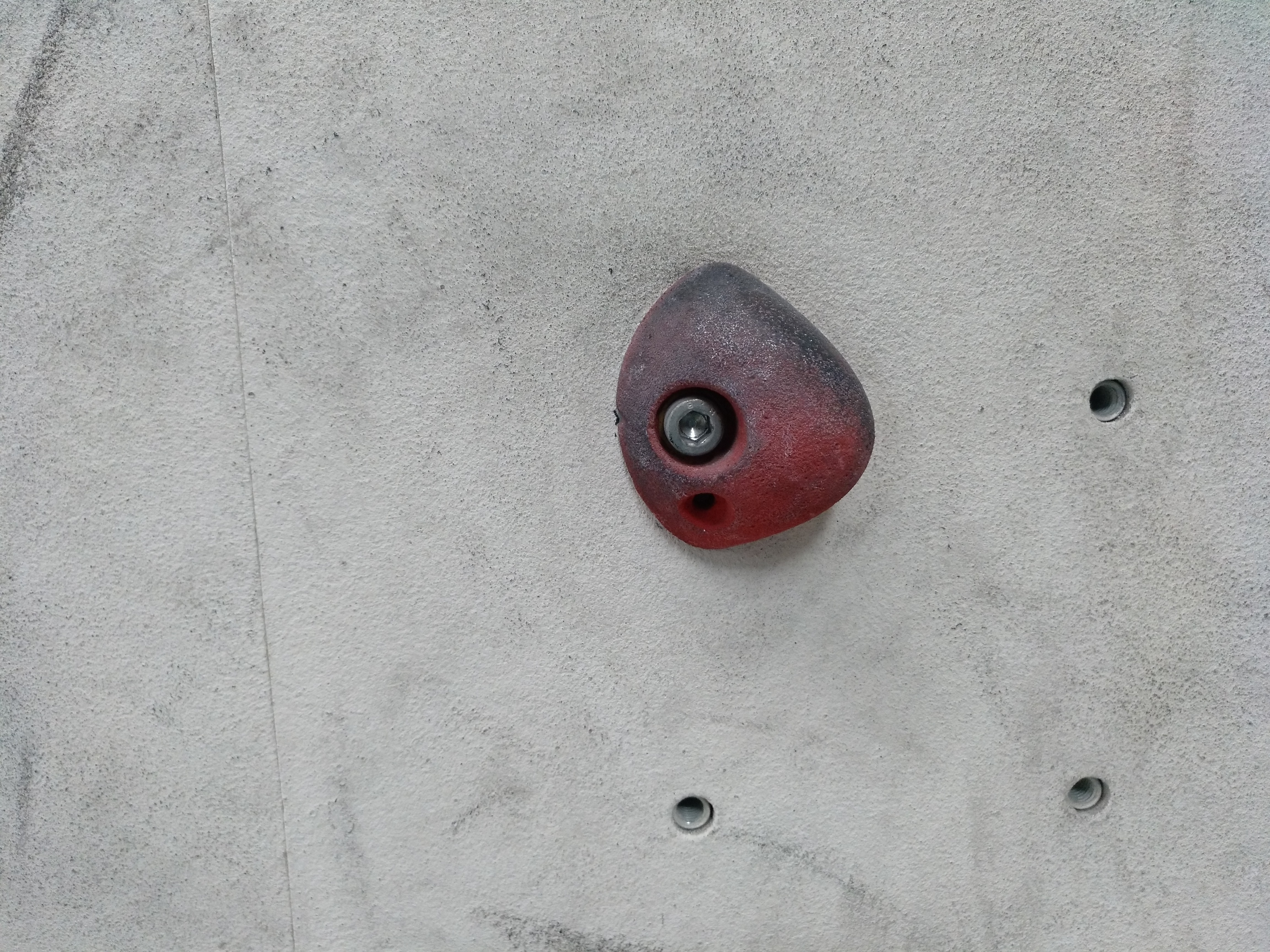
Small standardised speed climbing hold.

=== World champions ===
The defending men's and women's speed climbing world champions are Long Jianguo of China and Aleksandra Mirosław of Poland, respectively; they won their respective speed events at the 2025 IFSC Climbing World Championships in Seoul, South Korea. Kiromal Katibin of Indonesia and Emma Hunt of USA were the overall men's and women's winners for the 2025 IFSC Climbing World Cup speed series.

=== World and Olympic records ===
Progression of IFSC speed climbing records to July 2022

Since Qixin Zhong of China ran the 15-meter standardized wall in 6.26 seconds in 2011, the world record has been broken 20 times. The record has been broken thirteen times since 2021, most recently 4.58 seconds by Zhao Yicheng of China in April 2026 at the Asian Beach Games in Sanya, China. That represents a drop of 26.8 percent since 2011.

Similarly, the women's speed climbing record has been broken 20 times since 2013, nine times since 2021, dropping from 7.85 seconds to the 6.06 seconds set by Aleksandra Mirosław of Poland in August 2024, a 22.8-percent reduction.

Men's World Record History
Date	Time (s)	Person	Location	Competition
August 27, 2011	6.26	(China) Zhong Qixin	Arco, Italy	World Championships
October 13, 2012	5.88	(Russia) Evgenii Vaitcekhovskii	Xining, China	World Cup
August 30, 2014	5.76	(Czech Republic) Libor Hroza	Arco, Italy	World Cup
August 31, 2014	5.73	(Czech Republic) Libor Hroza	Arco, Italy	World Cup
September 12, 2014	5.60	(Ukraine) Danyil Boldyrev	Gijón, Spain	World Championships
April 30, 2017	5.48	(Iran) Reza Alipour	Nanjing, China	World Cup
May 28, 2021	5.25	(Indonesia) Kiromal Katibin	Salt Lake City, US	World Cup
May 28, 2021	5.20	(Indonesia) Veddriq Leonardo	Salt Lake City, US	World Cup
May 6, 2022	5.17	(Indonesia) Kiromal Katibin	Seoul, South Korea	World Cup
May 27, 2022	5.10	(Indonesia) Kiromal Katibin	Salt Lake City, US	World Cup
June 30, 2022	5.09	(Indonesia) Kiromal Katibin	Villars, Switzerland	World Cup
June 30, 2022	5.04	(Indonesia) Kiromal Katibin	Villars, Switzerland	World Cup
July 8, 2022	5.009	(Indonesia) Kiromal Katibin	Chamonix, France	World Cup
April 28, 2023	4.984	(Indonesia) Veddriq Leonardo	Seoul, South Korea	World Cup
April 28, 2023	4.90	(Indonesia) Veddriq Leonardo	Seoul, South Korea	World Cup
April 12, 2024	4.798	(United States) Samuel Watson	Wujiang, China	World Cup
April 12, 2024	4.859	(United States) Samuel Watson	Wujiang, China	World Cup
August 6, 2024	4.75	(United States) Samuel Watson	Paris, France	Olympics
August 8, 2024	4.74	(United States) Samuel Watson	Paris, France	Olympics
May 3, 2025	4.67	(United States) Samuel Watson	Bali, Indonesia	World Cup
May 3, 2025	4.64	(United States) Samuel Watson	Bali, Indonesia	World Cup
April 28, 2026	4.58	(China) Zhao Yicheng	Sanya, China	Asian Beach Games
May 10, 2026	4.54	(China) Zhao Yicheng	Wujiang, China	World Climbing Series

Men's Olympic Record History
Date	Time (s)	Person	Location	Games
August 3, 2021	5.45	(France) Bassa Mawem	Aomi Urban Sports Park, Tokyo, Japan	Tokyo 2020
August 6, 2024	4.79	(Indonesia) Veddriq Leonardo	Paris, France	Paris 2024
August 6, 2024	4.75	(United States) Samuel Watson	Paris, France	Paris 2024
August 8, 2024	4.74	(United States) Samuel Watson	Paris, France	Paris 2024

Women's World Record History
Date	Time (s)	Person	Location	Competition
October 19, 2013	7.85	(Russia) Iuliia Kaplina	Wujiang, China	World Cup
May 17, 2015	7.74	(Russia) Iuliia Kaplina	Central Saanich, Canada	World Cup
June 21, 2015	7.56	(Russia) Iuliia Kaplina	Chongqing, China	World Cup
July 11, 2015	7.53	(Russia) Iuliia Kaplina	Chamonix, France	World Cup
April 23, 2017	7.46	(Russia) Iuliia Kaplina	Chongqing, China	World Cup
April 30, 2017	7.38	(Russia) Iuliia Kaplina	Nanjing, China	World Cup
July 22, 2017	7.32	(Russia) Iuliia Kaplina	Wrocław, Poland	World Games
April 22, 2018	7.32	(France) Anouck Jaubert	Moscow, Russia	World Cup
April 26, 2019	7.10	(China) Song Yiling	Chongqing, China	World Cup
October 19, 2019	6.99	(Indonesia) Aries Susanti Rahayu	Xiamen, China	World Cup
November 21, 2020	6.96	(Russia) Iuliia Kaplina	Moscow, Russia	European Championships
August 6, 2021	6.84	(Poland) Aleksandra Mirosław	Tokyo, Japan	Olympic Games
May 6, 2022	6.64	(Poland) Aleksandra Mirosław	Seoul, South Korea	World Cup
May 27, 2022	6.53	(Poland) Aleksandra Mirosław	Salt Lake City, US	World Cup
April 28, 2023	6.46	(Poland) Aleksandra Mirosław	Seoul, South Korea	World Cup
April 28, 2023	6.37	(Poland) Aleksandra Mirosław	Seoul, South Korea	World Cup
April 28, 2023	6.35	(Poland) Aleksandra Mirosław	Seoul, South Korea	World Cup
April 28, 2023	6.25	(Poland) Aleksandra Mirosław	Seoul, South Korea	World Cup
September 15, 2023	6.24	(Poland) Aleksandra Mirosław	Rome, Italy	IFSC European Olympic Qualifier
August 5, 2024	6.21	(Poland) Aleksandra Mirosław	Paris, France	Olympics
August 5, 2024	6.06	(Poland) Aleksandra Mirosław	Paris, France	Olympics
September 24, 2025	6.03	(Poland) Aleksandra Mirosław	Seoul, South Korea	IFSC Climbing World Championships
July 4, 2026	5.99	(United States) Emma Hunt	Kraków, Poland	World Climbing Series

Women's Olympic Record History
Date	Time (s)	Person	Location	Games
August 4, 2021	6.97	(Poland) Aleksandra Mirosław	Tokyo, Japan	Tokyo 2020
August 6, 2021	6.84	(Poland) Aleksandra Mirosław	Tokyo, Japan	Tokyo 2020
August 5, 2024	6.54	(China) Zhou Yafei	Paris, France	Paris 2024
August 5, 2024	6.52	(Indonesia) Desak Made Rita Kusuma Dewi	Paris, France	Paris 2024
August 5, 2024	6.36	(United States) Emma Hunt	Paris, France	Paris 2024
August 5, 2024	6.21	(Poland) Aleksandra Mirosław	Paris, France	Paris 2024
August 5, 2024	6.06	(Poland) Aleksandra Mirosław	Paris, France	Paris 2024

=== Speed relay ===
Speed relay is a team variation of competition speed climbing in which successive climbers complete the standardized speed route as part of a team. An earlier version of the event was contested at the 2018 and 2022 Asian Games, with three climbers racing for each team.

A revised speed relay format using two athletes per team made its international debut at the 2025 World Games in Chengdu, China. The format uses four parallel speed-climbing lanes. In men's and women's relay events, each team consists of two climbers, with one team occupying lanes A and B and its opponent occupying lanes C and D. The first climber races on the team's left-hand lane; after touching the finishing pad, the second climber starts on the adjacent lane. The team's result is determined by the combined times of the two climbers. Relay world records are recognised separately from individual speed-climbing world records; individual split times recorded during a relay cannot be recognised as individual world records.

At the 2025 World Games, China won the inaugural men's and women's titles under the two-athlete format. Zachary Hammer and Samuel Watson of the United States set the men's world record during the bronze-medal race, while Deng Lijuan and Zhou Yafei of China set the women's world record during the semifinals.

A mixed speed relay, consisting of one woman and one man, made its World Climbing international debut at the World Climbing Series event in Kraków, Poland, in July 2026. Teams may choose the order in which their female and male climbers compete. Emma Hunt and Watson won the inaugural mixed relay title for the United States, setting a world record of 10.89 seconds in the final.

Speed Relay's World Record
Event	Date	Time (s)	Person (s)	Location	Competition
Men	September 13, 2026	9.58	China; Ling Yongzhi; Zhao Yicheng	Guiyang, China	World Climbing Series
Women	July 5, 2026	12.89	China; Zhou Yafei; Deng Lijuan	Kraków, Poland	World Climbing Series
Mixed	July 4, 2026	10.89	United States; Samuel Watson; Emma Hunt	Kraków, Poland	World Climbing Series

== Non-competition speed climbing ==
Most non-competition speed climbing records lack the standards normally associated with objective records. Competition speed climber Hans Florine has written about non-competition speed climbing: "I will be the first to say that climbing is silly. To make rules about it is just piling ridiculous on top of silly."

However, various climbers have set "speed records" on well-known and frequently climbed routes, such as Dan Osman climbing Lover's Leap via the Bear's Reach route (5.7, 120+ metre) in 4 min 25 sec. The most notable of such records are listed below:

=== Notable non-competition records ===
==== California ====
The Nose, El Capitan

- 1:58:07 Alex Honnold and Tommy Caldwell June 2018.
- 2:10:15 Alex Honnold and Tommy Caldwell May 2018.
- 2:19:44 Brad Gobright and Jim Reynolds October 2017.
- 2:45:45 Alexander and Thomas Huber, 2007
- 4:43:00 Mayan Smith-Gobat and Libby Sauter October 2014 (all female ascent).
- 12:15:00 Heidi Wertz and Wera Shulte-Pelcum 2004 (all female ascent).
- 11:41:00 Hans Florine solo. July 2005.
- 11:00:00 Tommy Caldwell 2005 (free ascent male).
- 12:00:00 Thierry Renault and Pascall Etienne (french climbers), 1979
- 23:46:00 Lynn Hill 1994 (free ascent).

Regular Northwest Route, Half Dome

- 1:53:25 Jim Herson and Hans Florine 1999.
- 5:25 Heidi Wertz and Wera Shulte-Pelcum 2004 (all female ascent).
- 3:58 Hans Florine solo 1999 (Full day also included El Cap).

Snake Dike, Half Dome

- 3:00 Dean Potter 1998 (car to car).

Joshua Tree National Park

- 280 Routes in a day Michael Reardon solo 2004.

==== Colorado ====
Bastille Crack

- 00:05:33 Mic Fairchild solo 1998.

Third Flatiron

- 36:27 Bill Briggs solo 1989 (car to car).

==== Nevada ====
Epinephrine

- 0:39:40 Alex Honnold 2018
- 1:15 Jash Stwart solo 2002.

Cat In The Hat

- 2:35 David Laxton solo 2013.

==== New York ====
The Gunks

- 50 Routes 13:30 Peter Darmi solo 2004.
- 46 Routes 13:30 Eric Weigeshoff and Peter Darmi 2004. 3400' of climbing and descent.
- 51 Routes 13:30 Eric Weigeshoff and Peter Darmi 2006 3400' of climbing and descent.

==== Wyoming ====
Grand Traverse

- 6:40 Rolando Garibotti solo 2000.

== See also ==
- Competition bouldering
- Competition lead climbing
- Competition ice climbing
