= Bear's Reach =

Rock climbing route on Lover's Leap mountain, USA

- Location: Lake Tahoe, California, United States
- Coordinates: 38.79940°N 120.135°W
- Climbing area: Lover's Leap, East Wall
- Route type: Trad
- Vertical gain: 400 feet (120 m)
- Pitches: 3
- NCCS grade: 5.7 (5a)
- First ascent: Phil Berry & Robin Linnett, 1956.
- Fastest ascent: Alex Honnold 00:04:15.

The Bear's Reach is a technical rock climbing route on Lover's Leap near Lake Tahoe, California. Considered a classic for its grade, it includes both face and crack climbing. The route is named for the crux of the second pitch, a long reach between two large holds. The route is best known in popular culture through a viral video featuring Dan Osman speed climbing the route in 4 min 25 sec, and completing a famous ropeless double dyno between two holds. The video was featured in Masters of Stone IV, 1997.

This mark was bettered when Alex Honnold completed it in 4:15.
