= Speed climbing wall =

Apparatus used for competitive speed climbing

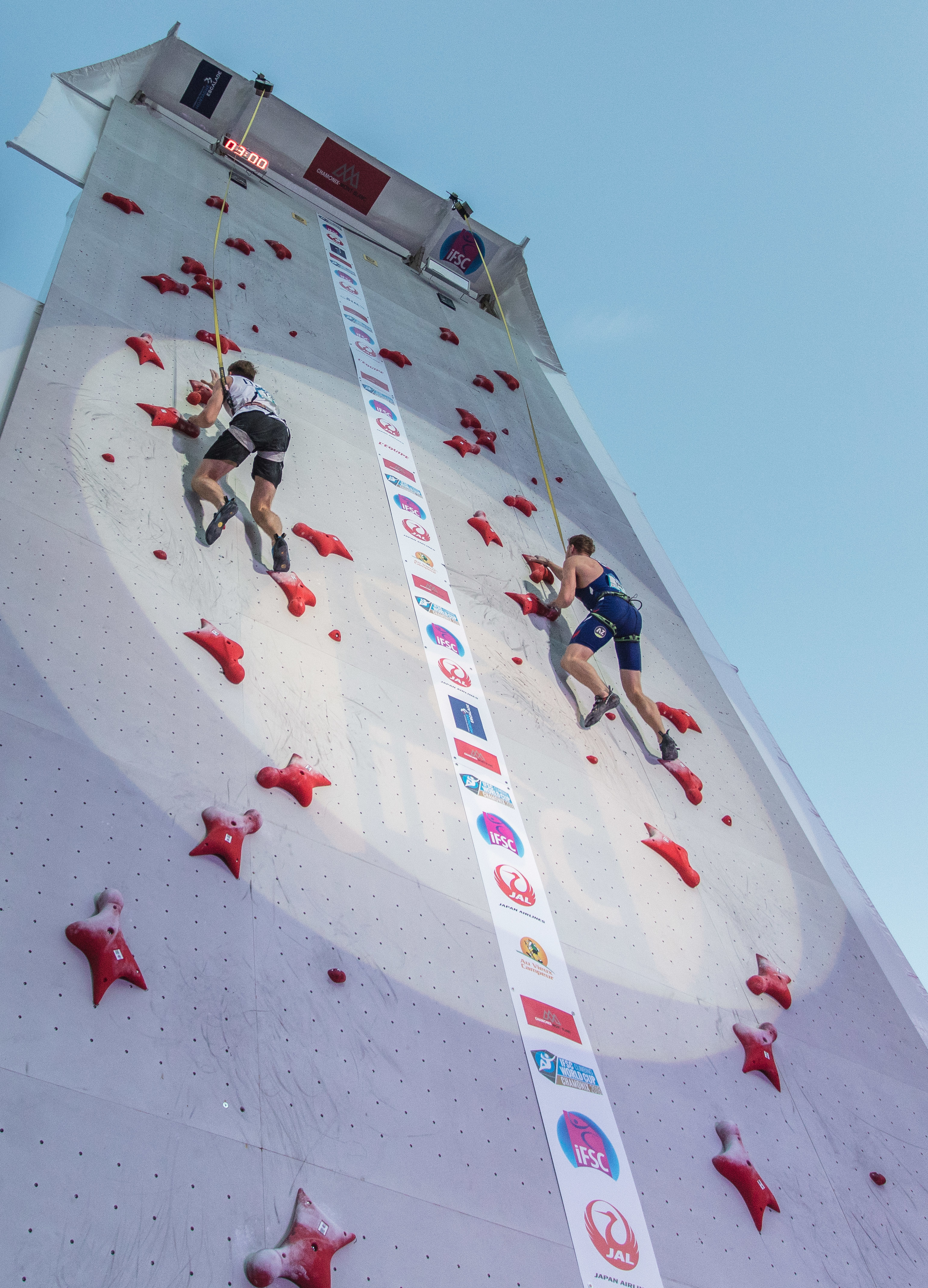

A speed climbing wall is an artificial standardised climbing wall and is the main apparatus used for competitive speed climbing.

For such competitions – including those in the Olympics – the speed climbing wall has been normed by the IFSC in a way that records are comparable. The norm defines height, angle and surface of the wall, shape and size of the hand and footholds as well as their position and orientation on the wall. For world records, the wall has to be produced by a licensed manufacturer as well as inspected and approved by the IFSC. For safety, it has to comply with European Norm EN 12572–1.

== Specification ==
The current IFSC rules for climbing competitions refer to "artificial structures designed to ... the IFSC Speed Licence Rules". For the latter, the most current document is from 2022.

While both a 15 m and a 10 m wall are specified, world records are taken on the 15 m wall only.

=== 15 m wall design ===
The wall itself has a height of 15000 mm and consists of two lanes, each 3000 mm wide, with a distance of 0 to 1000 mm from each other. The wall stands on a 200 mm socle and must continue 500 mm above the finish button, i.e. above the 15 m.

The wall must overhang continuously with an angle of 5°.

The climbable surface has to be light grey, covered by a resin-quartz with 0.1/0.4 granulometry, the numbers referring to grain sizes of fine sand.

The top anchor point must be 1000 mm higher than the climbing wall and stand out 1000 mm from the wall.

The layout for mounting the holds is based on a concept of square panels with a size of 1500 mm x 1500 mm each. Thus 20 panels, 10 vertically by 2 horizontally, form one of the two lanes. They are referred to by 'sn' and 'dx' (based on Italian terms for left and right), and numbered from 1 to 10 counting from the bottom.

Each panel holds a grid of mounting holes, 11 horizontally (lettered A-K from left to right) and 10 vertically (numbered 1–10 from bottom to top). The grid spacing is 125 mm horizontally, from the edge to the next hole, and between holes. Vertically, the distance is 188 mm from the edge and 125 mm between holds. Thus the vertical size sums up as (188 + 9 x 125 + 188) = 1501 mm, which is 1 mm more than the specified panel size. The holes have M10 threaded inserts.

Tolerances are typically of ±1 mm for panel-based measures, and ±2 mm between panels.

If the wall is not structured in the panels described above, the global grid layout should be the same as for the panelled version.

Each mounting point in the grid has an individual reference comprising the side (sn, dx), the panel number from the bottom, and the alphanumeric grid point within the panel; for example dx3 G3.

=== Holds ===
The two types of holds, 20 big hand holds and 11 small foot holds, are modelled after an official master hold provided by the IFSC. Competition holds are equally coloured in bright red.

The shape of the big holds is characterised by four forms protruding in four directions from the central mounting hole. Most prominent is a ball-like structure, clockwise followed by a rounded hill, a pointed long tail opposing the ball, and a shorter pointed tail. The concave shapes between the protruding elements have different well-defined incuts.

In the wall topology, the central mounting point is listed with its grid reference, and the vector starting at the central point going to the long tail describes the orientation, by pointing towards a second grid reference.

The shape of the small holds is simpler, however the mounting hole is excentric, thus the orientation follows the vector going through the widest protruding side.

=== Timing system ===
The mechanical-electric timing systems consists of a starting pad, recording when the competitor lifts the foot (to identify false starts), and a stop device, which is hit with the hand at the top of the wall. The size of the stop device is not precisely specified in the rules, however it covers the holes A/B 9/10 on panel dx10, and its centre has to be 13140 mm above the starting hold, which computes as 15 mm above grid line 10 of dx10.

Manually taking of time was allowed as a backup solution in previous versions of the IFSC rules, but has been removed in 2018.

=== Belaying ===
Belaying is performed via a top anchor. While there are methods to quickly take in the rope manually with two belayers, automatic belay systems are increasingly installed, and the world record can only be taken when a certified auto-belay system is being used.

== See also ==
- Climbing styles
- Climbing competition
- International Federation of Sport Climbing (IFSC)
