= Libby Sauter =

American rock climber, mountaineer and nurse

Libby Sauter (born October 8, 1984) is an American mountaineer, rock climber, former pediatric cardiac intensive care nurse educator that now works as a primary care provider at a low income clinic in the USA. In 2007, she became the first woman to walk the Lost Arrow Spire highline.Sauter and her climbing partner, Mayan Smith-Gobat, set the women's speed record climbing The Nose on El Capitan, in 2014. In 2017, she became the youngest woman inducted into the American Alpine Club Hall of Fame.

== Mountaineering ==
Sauter made the first ascent of a new route on El Hermano in Chile in 2014. She set a female speed record on The Nose on El Capitan in October 2014, with Mayan Smith Gobat and Lurking Fear with Quinn Brett. She also was a part of the first all female team to climb the Salathe-In-A-Day and to climb two routes in one day on El Cap also with Quinn Brett. In 2016, she climbed 4 big wall routes in a day with Quinn Brett. She was the first woman to walk the Lost Arrow Spire highline in Yosemite National Park. She is the youngest inductee to the Mountaineering Hall of Fame.

== Nursing ==
Sauter received her nursing degree from the University of Nevada, Las Vegas, in 2006. Her nursing career began at Stanford Children’s Hospital in Palo Alto, California in the Pediatric Cardiovascular Intensive Care Unit. In 2009, Sauter began volunteering with the Novick Cardiac Alliance and has been on staff as a pediatric cardiac intensive nurse since 2012 working on location in Libya, Iraq, Honduras and Ukraine. In 2022, she completed a doctor of nursing practice from Johns Hopkins School of Nursing.
