= Mayan Smith-Gobat =

New Zealand rock climber

Mayan Smith-Gobat (born 1979) is a professional big-wall climber from New Zealand and, as of 2019, held the record for fastest all-female team ascent of El Capitan's The Nose in Yosemite, California at four hours and forty three minutes. Smith-Gobat, along with climbing partner Libby Sauter, completed the climb in October, 2014. Other notable ascents include her 2012 first female ascent (FFA) of Punks in the Gym (5.14a) in the Arapiles climbing region of Australia, and the first all female Half Dome/El Cap link up in Yosemite in 2013.

== Early life ==
Smith-Gobat is from Christchurch, New Zealand. Although she became interested in alpine and sport climbing around Mount Cook as a teenager, her focus turned to alpine skiing for several years. In 2000, she was competing in extreme skiing competitions and ranked as the best female extreme skier in New Zealand. Smith-Gobat recalls that "when I left school I became side-tracked by skiing - I followed winters around the world and barely climbed for a couple of years... until a skiing accident turned my attention back to climbing" at the age of 21. Smith-Gobat had been skiing in Breckenridge, Colorado at the time of the accident, a run-in with a pine tree. The collision broke a heel in one leg and ankle in the other, and left her with a temporarily wired-shut jaw and six months of crutches. Grounded from skiing, Smith-Gobat turned to climbing as an outlet for her energies.

== Climbing Achievements ==
After recovery from her accident, Smith-Gobat began racking up a string of sport climbing and bouldering accomplishments. Starting in 2002, Smith-Gobat made FFAs of many New Zealand-based bouldering routes and won the New Zealand National Bouldering Series in 2002, 2003 and 2004, and the Christchurch Indoor Bouldering Series in 2005. By 2007 she was climbing up to 8b+ (V10/5.14a) level routes, including a first ascent Heaven/ Little Babylon (8b/8b+) in Milford, NZ. By the late 2000s, Smith-Gobat was one of the leading climbers from New Zealand, male or female, and was the first New Zealand woman to climb grades 29 (8a), 30 (8a+), 31 (8b), 32 (8b+) and 33 (8c, L’academicien in Ceuse, France).

=== Salathé Wall ===
By 2009, Smith-Gobat was climbing in Yosemite and interested in taking on big-wall challenges. The Salathé Wall is a classic route up El Capitan in Yosemite Valley. At approximately 3500 ft and 35-pitches, it is also one of the longest routes, known for its difficult, off-width crack sections. A single female climber, Steph Davis, had previously free climbed Salathé. Smith-Gobat spent the summer of 2010 working out the beta for the crux sections before making a ground-up attempt. Unfortunately, a five-day rain storm hit while she was in the upper reaches of the climb, forcing her to bail out. In 2011, Smith-Gobat returned and, in a six day final push, managed to complete the remaining pitches, becoming only the second woman to do so. Later, she described the experience as "900m of air under my feet and only one single flared crack splitting the sheer overhung granite wall. It felt so good."

=== Speed Climbing The Nose ===
Smith-Gobat became interested in attempting to break the women's record for climbing speed on The Nose after hearing how slow the old one was. "I first started thinking about doing it when the women’s record was 12 hours, basically because I felt that this was almost an embarrassment to us." In 2012, she and partner Chantel Astorga set a new record with a seven hour and 26 minute climb of The Nose. They then linked to Half Dome, becoming the first all female team to complete the linked climb in under 24 hours (at 20h:09m). Smith-Gobat also broke the mixed-gender record for The Nose, finishing it in three hours and 29 minutes with partner Sean Leary. By the end of 2012, between Salathé, a FFA of Australia's iconic Punks in the Gym (8b+) in October, 2012 and the Yosemite speed records, Planet Mountain would describe Smith-Gobat as "certainly one of the world's leading rock climbers."

In 2014, with partner Libby Sauter, Smith-Gobat would set a new women's record, four hours and forty three minutes. The women made several attempts that season, improving in speed each time. Smith-Gobat noted that they had to work both on developing trust and communication and to learn a different style of climbing that emphasized speed over safety. The team decreased the number of bolts, increasing the height of any potential fall. On easier sections, the climbers simul-climbed, a higher-risk climbing technique, while on harder sections, they employed a short-fixing style. Smith-Gobat described the technique they used to increase speed as "pretty risky...if I fall off, I'm hopefully not going to die, but I'm going to fall a hell of a long way before I hit the end of that rope." She noted that "the main difference between us and the guys who are climbing it in 2:30, is that they simulclimb more of the upper half of the route, where we are short-fixing more to keep it within the safety margin we are happy with."

=== Riders on the Storm ===
==== 2016 Attempt ====
By 2016, Smith-Gobat had turned her focus towards making the first free ascent of Riders on the Storm, a massive 1300 m (4265 ft) route up the east face of Torre Central in Torres del Paine, Patagonia. The region surrounding Torre Central is notorious for fickle weather and poor conditions. Several key pitches are nearly always encased in ice, and the route, crusted with unstable rock, requires strength in a variety of styles, including crack, roof and face. Wolfgang Güllich and Kurt Albert put up Riders on the Storm over the winter of 1990/1991 using a mixed aid climbing technique. The original climbers were able to free climb pitches up to 7c (5.12d) and aid climb to A3. While the first free ascent of Riders is considered a "plum objective throughout the big wall climbing world," according to PlanetMountain, the region's notoriously bad weather and the allure of more popular routes nearby at Fitz Roy and Cerro Torre, limited the number of attempts. Up to 2016, three teams successfully reached the summit following Riders on the Storm, none making a free ascent.

Over the course of 15 days in January and February 2016, Smith-Gobat, climbing partner Ines Papert and photographer Thomas Senf broached the climb. The climbers began with a rare stretch of good weather, and were able to establish a five-pitch free climbing variant to avoid a section that had previously only been possible with aid climbing. They also succeeded at free climbing two previously unconquered upper pitches and became the fifth team to reach the summit on 6 February. The duo endured numb hands and feet and near-miss rockfalls. At one point, they developed an innovative, but disconcerting, technique to deal with the ice, wearing a climbing shoe on one foot and an ice boot with crampons on the other. After summit day, with deteriorating weather and 110 mph winds in the forecast, the team resolved to try to complete the remaining four pitches they had yet to free climb.

Early on in the attempt, they were delayed for several hours when they found that their cached ropes and equipment had been buried under an avalanche and needed to be dug out. During the ascent, the predicted high winds hit, and after struggling to reach the portaledge, they decided to descend. Continuing bad weather ended the trip without the first free ascent, although they achieved the summit and free climbed several new sections, extending the difficulty level to 7c+ (5.13a). The women had several near misses, surviving a rock fall into their portaledge and another that split Papert's helmet, and a nearly spliced rope. While Smith-Gobat wanted to give the route another try, Papert decided to forgo a second attempt, saying "I have had a lot of luck on the wall. Even though the prospect of coming back is very tempting, I have decided the level of risk is not worth it."

==== 2017 Attempt ====
Smith-Gobat recruited a new partner for the second attempt, up-and-coming climber Brette Harrington, who, at 25 years old, was making a name for herself with trad and free soloing accomplishments. Prior to her return, Smith-Gobat allowed that she wondered why so few others had successfully reached the summit. However, Torre Central presented a new face in 2017, one that made it clear exactly how difficult the task was going to be. "When Brette Harrington and I approached Torre Central our hearts sank: the lower slabs were covered in ice and ice snow, unrecognizable from last season." The climbers struggled through the lower sections to reach the four remaining pitches. They had originally planned to free climb all the lower pitches as well, but given poor conditions, they resolved to get to the crux pitches any way they could. In 2016, it took Papert and Smith-Gobat two days to reach the crux, but nearly four weeks the second time. Each morning they would wake at 3am, hoping for a break in the weather, only to encounter punishingly high winds, ice covered slabs, and wet rock. In the end, they were only able to work on the crux pitches for two days out of the six week attempt. Afterwards, Smith-Gobat would write of the experience "all I wanted to do was leave and never come back. It felt as if we were forcing something that was not meant to be—like swimming against a strong current. I was exhausted ... deep down I knew that leaving would mean never returning to Riders on the Storm. In this moment I hated the place. Hated that it was forcing me to face the one thing that had always terrified me about climbing in Patagonia—to sit still in a tent and wait with nothing to do for weeks on end; to sit and watch all that hard-earned strength waste away, and to what end?"

Despite falling short of the goal, Harrington and Smith-Gobat free climbed two of the four remaining pitches and felt that, even with the poor weather, they had been very close on a third. Harrington later wrote that she believed "the crux pitches could go," setting up a possible return trip for the duo. However, as of 2019, both Harrington and Smith-Gobat were focusing on other goals, with no public plans for another attempt on Riders on the Storm.
