= Kiromal Katibin =

Indonesian rock climber (born 2000)

- Katibin in 2023

Personal information
- Nationality: Indonesian
- Born: 21 August 2000 (age 26) Batang, Central Java, Indonesia

Climbing career
- Type of climber: Competition speed climbing
- Known for: Previous speed climbing world record holder (5.009 seconds, July 2022)
Medal record
Men's competition climbing
Representing Indonesia
World Games
Silver medal – second place	2022 Birmingham	Speed
Silver medal – second place	2025 Chengdu	Speed single 4
World Cup (Season)
Winner	2025	Speed
Silver medal – second place	2021	Speed
Silver medal – second place	2022	Speed
Asian Games
Silver medal – second place	2022 Hangzhou	Speed relay
Asian Championships
Silver medal – second place	2019 Bogor	Speed
Silver medal – second place	2019 Bogor	Speed relay
Asian Youth Championships
Gold medal – first place	2018 Chongqing	Speed juniors

Kiromal Katibin (born 21 August 2000) is an Indonesian competition climber who specializes in competition speed climbing. He was the world record holder in speed climbing, with a time of 5.009 seconds recorded at 2022 IFSC Climbing World Cup in Chamonix, France in July 2022, until it was broken by his compatriot Veddriq Leonardo in April 2023. He finished second overall in the men's speed category during the 2021 IFSC Climbing World Cup series. Katibin also has four career IFSC Climbing World Cup medals, all in speed.

== Early life ==
In 2007, Katibin saw sport climbing for the first time in a Batang city square during the Provincial Sports Week.

Since 2009, Katibin has been training with his brother. He was motivated to pursue sport climbing because he enjoyed meeting many friends, but he started winning national-level championships. His first medal was in the lead climbing competition at the 2011 National Championships. He also won the speed climbing gold medal at the 2016 National Championships and the speed climbing gold medal at the 2017 National Championships.

== Career ==
Katibin collected his first senior international medal, winning silver at the 2019 Asian Championships in Bogor, Indonesia.

On 28 May 2021, Katibin set a record for the fastest-ever ascent in competition speed climbing with a record of 5.25 seconds in the qualifying round of a IFSC World Cup event in Salt Lake City, United States. The record had been held by Reza Alipour who climbed in 5.48 seconds in 2017. He finished the competition with a silver medal, losing the same day in the final race to his compatriot Veddriq Leonardo, who set a new world record of 5.20 seconds. In July 2021, Katibin won a bronze at the Villars World Cup. He finished the 2021 World Cup series in second place overall.

On 6 May 2022, Katibin regained the world record from Leonardo with a 5.17-second run in the qualifying round of the World Cup event in Seoul, South Korea. On 27 May, he lowered his own world record with 5.10 seconds in the qualifying round of the World Cup event in Salt Lake City. On 30 June, he broke the record for the fourth time in the IFSC World Cup Villars qualifiers with 5.097 seconds and improved his record again later that day with a 5.04-second run. On 8 July, Katibin set the world record for the seventh time in 14 months with a time of 5.009 seconds at the Chamonix World Cup qualifying round.

In July 2022, Katibin won the silver medal at the World Games in Birmingham, Alabama, United States, losing to Leonardo in the final.

In April 2023, Katibin lost the world record to Leonardo, who recorded runs of 4.984 and 4.9000 seconds at the 2023 IFSC Climbing World Cup in Seoul.

== Achievements ==
=== World Games ===
Men's speed

Year	Venue	Opponent	Time (s)	Result	Ref
2022	Sloss Furnaces, Birmingham, United States	(Indonesia) Veddriq Leonardo	fall–7.230	(silver) Silver	

=== Asian Games ===
Men's speed relay

Year	Venue	Partner	Opponent	Time (s)	Result	Ref
2022	Keqiao Yangshan Sport Climbing Centre, Shaoxing, China	(Indonesia) Veddriq Leonardo (Indonesia) Rahmad Adi Mulyono (Indonesia) Aspar	(China) Wang Xinshang (China) Wu Peng (China) Zhang Liang (China) Long Jinbao	FS–W	(silver) Silver	

=== Asian Championships ===
Men's speed

Year	Venue	Opponent	Time (s)	Result	Ref
2019	Pakansari Stadium, Bogor, Indonesia	(Indonesia) Veddriq Leonardo	5.547–5.460	(silver) Silver	

Men's speed relay

Year	Venue	Partner	Opponent	Time (s)	Result	Ref
2019	Pakansari Stadium, Bogor, Indonesia	(Indonesia) Veddriq Leonardo (Indonesia) Zaenal Aripin	(Indonesia) Sabri (Indonesia) Rahmad Adi Mulyono (Indonesia) Fatchur Roji	fall–23.492	(silver) Silver	

=== Asian Youth Championships ===
Speed juniors

Year	Venue	Opponent	Time (s)	Result	Ref
2018	Chongqing, China	(Iran) Milad Alipour Shenazandifar	6.05–6.42	(gold) Gold	

=== IFSC Climbing World Cup ===
Men's speed

Year	Venue	Opponent	Time (s)	Result	Ref
2021	Salt Lake City, United States	(Indonesia) Veddriq Leonardo	fall–5.208	(silver) Silver	
2021	Villars, Switzerland	(Russia) Vladislav Deulin	5.30–5.38	(bronze) Bronze	
2022	Seoul, South Korea	(Indonesia) Veddriq Leonardo	fs–6.965	(silver) Silver	
2022	Salt Lake City (I), United States	(United States) Noah Bratschi	5.643–fall	(gold) Gold	
2022	Jakarta, Indonesia	(Indonesia) Aspar	5.75–5.39	(silver) Silver	
2023	Jakarta, Indonesia	(China) Wu Peng	6.34–fall	(bronze) Bronze	
2023	Salt Lake City, United States	(United States) Samuel Watson	4.98–5.98	(bronze) Bronze	
2024	Wujiang, China	(Italy) Ludovico Fossali	5.07–5.16	(bronze) Bronze	
2025	Wujiang, China	(United States) Samuel Watson	4.75–5.04	(bronze) Bronze	
2025	Bali, Indonesia	(Indonesia) Raharjati Nursamsa	4.81–6.64	(bronze) Bronze	
2025	Denver, United States	(United States) Zach Hammer	4.83–4.88	(gold) Gold	
2025	Kraków, Poland	(Indonesia) Raharjati Nursamsa	fall–4.73	(silver) Silver	

== World records ==
Men's World Record History
Date	Time (s)	Location	Competition
July 8, 2022	5.009	Chamonix, France	World Cup
June 30, 2022	5.04	Villars, Switzerland	World Cup
June 30, 2022	5.09	Villars, Switzerland	World Cup
May 27, 2022	5.10	Salt Lake City, United States	World Cup
May 6, 2022	5.17	Seoul, South Korea	World Cup
May 28, 2021	5.25	Salt Lake City, United States	World Cup

== Rankings ==
=== IFSC Climbing World Cup ===
Discipline	2021	2022	2023	2024	2025
Speed	2	2	16	8	1

== Number of medals in the Climbing World Cup ==
=== Speed ===
Season	Gold	Silver	Bronze	Total
2021	0	1	1	2
2022	1	2	0	3
2023	0	0	2	2
2024	0	0	1	1
2025	1	1	2	4
Total	2	4	6	12
