= Leaning Tower, Yosemite =

Tower in Yosemite Valley

Coordinates: 37.71360°N 119.64832°W

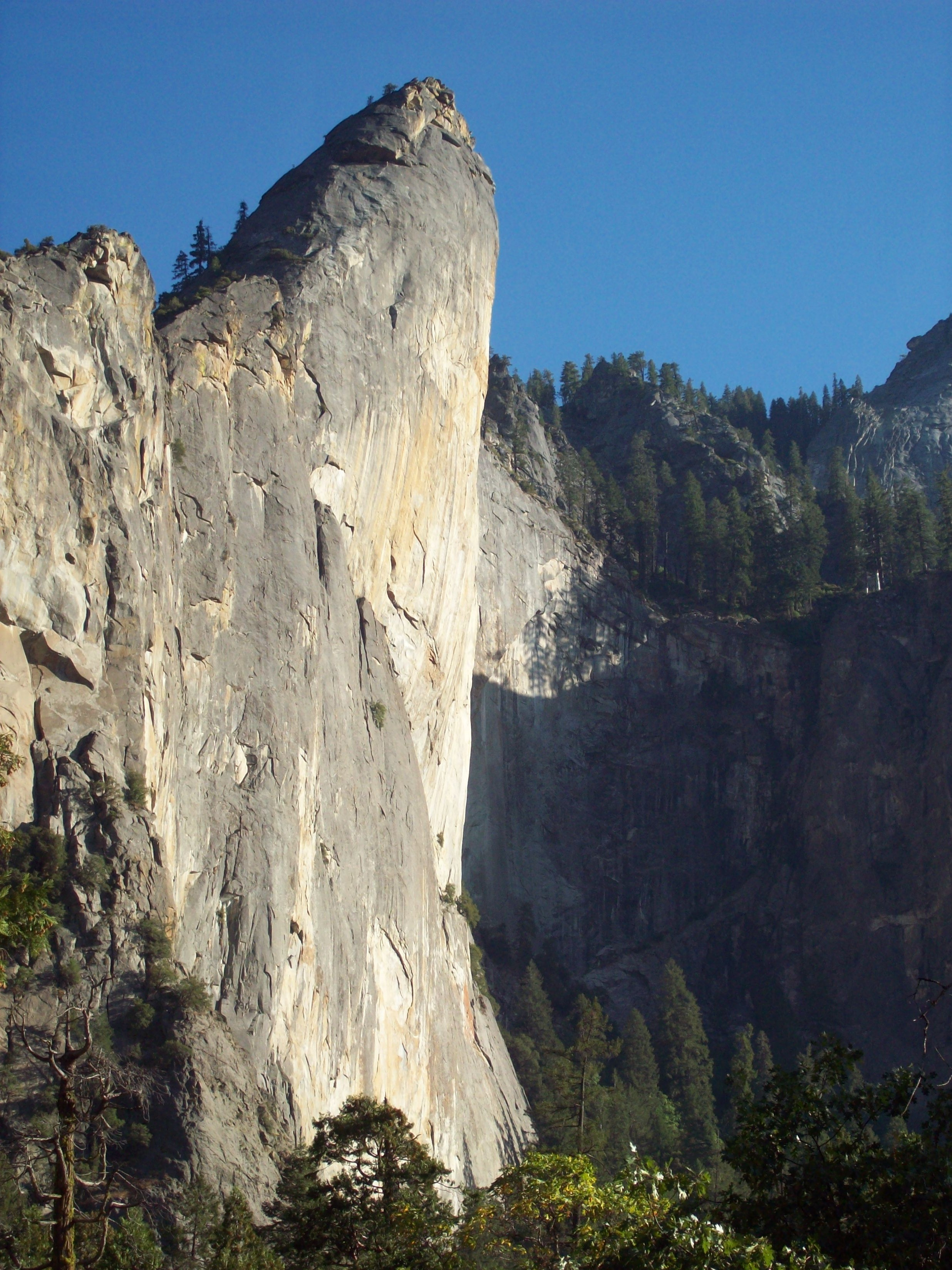
Leaning Tower, Yosemite Valley

The Leaning Tower in Yosemite National Park is a popular destination for rock climbers. It is located west of, and adjacent to Bridalveil Fall, on the south side of the Merced River in Yosemite Valley. The rock is considered to be a strenuous climb, requiring approximately three days to climb to the summit. It is said to be a 700-foot (210 m) climb.
