= List of fatalities due to wingsuit flying =

Fatalities from wingsuit flying have occurred almost from the inception of the sport. Listed below are examples where wingsuit pilots were publicly named in the press, including when wingsuit practice was not the first cause of death.

| | Date | Name | Age | Location | Details |
|---|---|---|---|---|---|
| 01 | 4 February 1912 | Franz Reichelt | 33 | France | The inventor of a pre-modern wingsuit, jumped from the Eiffel Tower to his death in a failed test flight. He was told multiple times to not do it, but he was confident. People managing the Eiffel Tower thought he was going to use a test dummy. |
| 02 | 16 September 1963 | Gerard Masselin | 27 | France | The French stunt parachutist jumped from a biplane showing his wingsuit to the camera and was killed after his parachute failed to open. |
| 03 | 13 April 1998 | Patrick de Gayardon | 38 | United States | A pioneer of modern wingsuit design, Gayardon's parachute rigging malfunctioned after jumping from a plane in Hawaii. |
| 04 | 11 October 2002 | Lukas Knutsson | 38 | Switzerland | Experienced Swedish BASE jumper, died when his parachute failed to deploy during a jump from Fürenalp, near Engelberg in the Swiss Alps. Brother of Swedish fashion designer Filippa Knutsson. |
| 05 | 5 October 2003 | Dwain Weston | 30 | United States | Australian skydiver who held the 2002 BASE jumping world title, died after hitting a railing on the Royal Gorge Bridge near Cañon City, Colorado. This was not a BASE accident as he had jumped from an airplane; it was technically an illegal jump since he used BASE equipment containing only one parachute (i.e., no reserve parachute). The pilots were eventually reprimanded for allowing the jump. |
| 06 | 22 October 2004 | Roland "Slim" Simpson | 35 | China | Australian BASE jumper. On 6 October 2004, Simpson leapt from the Jin Mao Tower, the tallest skyscraper in China at the time, in a wingsuit. After a good jump and flight, his parachute opened with multiple line twists making it difficult to steer and he crashed onto an adjacent building. He went into a coma, and died several days later in Canberra Hospital. |
| 07 | 9 May 2007 | Jimmy Hall | 41 | Canada | American adventurer and TV personality died on an expedition to Baffin Island in northern Canada. After several days of successful jumps, Hall attempted a wingsuit flight through a canyon. He failed to clear a ledge, and struck the cliff. |
| 08 | 26 March 2009 | Shane McConkey | 39 | Italy | McConkey was a professional skier and BASE jumper. While performing a complicated ski-BASE jump in Italy, he experienced problems when he attempted to release his skis, and as a result failed to deploy his parachute in time. |
| 09 | 28 August 2009 | Eli Thompson | 36 | Switzerland | Died while performing a wingsuit proximity-flying jump from a helicopter in the Swiss Alps. He accidentally hit the side of the mountain. |
| 10 | 12 April 2010 | Geoffrey Robson | 30 | South Africa | Died during a wingsuit BASE jump and proximity flight from a cliff on Duiwelskloof near Stellenbosch, South Africa. Originally from South Africa, Robson was a PhD candidate at ETH Zurich working on the mathematical modelling of the aerodynamic characteristics of wingsuits. He was described by a former professor as "very careful [, taking] the sport seriously". |
| 11 | 16 September 2011 | Valentina Rotar | 37 | Switzerland | From Slovenia, died while jumping from High Nose in Lauterbrunnen, Switzerland. After opening her parachute, she hit the cliff wall and was killed on impact. At the time, she was one of two women BASE jumpers in Slovenia |
| 12 | 21 October 2011 | Antoine Montant | 30 | France | Multi-extreme sport athlete died after experiencing a wingsuit accident near Collet d’Anterne in Haute Savoie, French Alps. When his body was found, his parachute was undeployed. At the time of the accident, Montant was jumping alone. |
| 13 | 23 June 2012 | Hervé Le Gallou | 51 | France | Veteran BASE jumper, died wingsuiting on Grande Tête de l'Obiou in the French Alps when he was killed on impact, due to possible equipment failure. Along with Dave McDonnell, Le Gallou was one of the first people to jump from the Burj Khalifa and had jumped from the Eiffel Tower over 40 times. |
| 14 | 7 July 2012 | Alan McCandlish | 31 | Switzerland | New Zealander, was jumping with friends when he struck the cliff face and fell near Berner Oberland, southwest of Zürich. McCandlish hit a ledge, plunged over a cliff and fell to another ledge to his death. Australian BASE jumper Chris "Douggs" McDougall, who witnessed the accident noted how McCandlish was wearing a new suit for the jump and may have misjudged his ability to turn. McDougall wrote that the accident was a result of "100% human error". McCandlish was part of the team that pioneered the Kaipo Wall in Fiordland National Park in 2008. They were first to claim the biggest vertical cliff in New Zealand. |
| 15 | 7 August 2012 | Shane Murphy | 30 | France | US wingsuiter and veteran of 1,000+ jumps died after jumping from Tête de Croix de Fer near Chamonix, France, where wingsuit flying was banned. |
| 16 | 9 September 2012 | Wioletta Roslan | 37 | Switzerland | Swedish-Polish adventurer, died on a wingsuit jump from the Flower Box at Lauterbrunnen, Switzerland when her parachute failed to open. Wioletta began skydiving at age 19 and had jumped from this location many times before. Four months pregnant at the time of her death, Wioletta was making one last jump before her pregnancy advanced further. |
| 17 | 8 December 2012 | Peter Farley | 33 | Australia | Australian, was killed in a wingsuit jump after colliding with another skydiver during a formation dive above Wilton, southwest Sydney, Australia. Farley was said to be struggling with his wingsuit during the jump. An investigation found half of the 17 flyers participating in the jump lacked the prescribed Australian Parachute Federation ''star crest'' qualification to perform jumps with more than 10 people. The organization suspended several instructors who were involved in the mass skydive after the accident. Farley's death is recognized as the first wingsuit death in Australia. |
| 18 | 12 December 2012 | Eiliv Ruud | 37 | United States | Norwegian, struck a vertical cliff and spiraled out of control during a wingsuit jump near Grand Canyon in the United States. |
| 19 | 3 January 2013 | Kurt Ruppert | 29 | United States | Experienced skydiver and wingsuit flyer was last seen when he jumped from a helicopter over Mount Si in Washington state. He never reached the landing zone. The original search area covered 9 square miles. Search teams called off the search days later, saying it was unlikely he had survived. His body was never found. |
| 20 | 14 August 2013 | Mark Sutton | 42 | Switzerland | British stuntman who had parachuted into the 2012 Summer Olympics opening ceremony as a James Bond character, was killed when he hit a ridge while wingsuit BASE-jumping near Martigny, Switzerland. He was participating in an event sponsored by Epic TV, and a wingsuit expert stated that he appeared to have miscalculated the gradient of the ground he was flying over. |
| 21 | 18 August 2013 | Mario Richard | 47 | Italy | Canadian-American wingsuit flyer, died during a wingsuit BASE jump from Sass Pordoi in Italy’s Dolomites. In 2011, he was the first to jump from Tofana di Rozes alongside his wife, Steph Davis. In 2012, Richard estimated he had completed 7,000 sky dives and 2,000 BASE jumps without injury. |
| 22 | 23 August 2013 | Álvaro Bultó | 51 | Switzerland | Spanish TV presenter, extreme sports enthusiast and wingsuit flier, died after a wingsuit BASE-jump in Switzerland. He was the son of Francisco Bultó, the founder of the Bultaco and Montesa motorbike companies. |
| 23 | 9 October 2013 | Victor Kovats | 40 | China | Hungarian wingsuit flyer, plunged to his death in a trial run before the Red Bull World Wingsuit League world championships in Tianmen Mountain. His parachute failed to open due to equipment failure or adverse wind conditions. Kovats was a three-time Hungarian national wingsuit champion and had successfully completed over 700 jumps before his death. |
| 24 | 14 January 2014 | David Strather | 41 | United States | Canadian doctor, was killed during a wingsuit proximity flight near the Grand Canyon. He died on impact 15–20 seconds after jumping, possibly from equipment failure. |
| 25 | 8 February 2014 | Amber Bellows | 28 | United States | American BASE jumper and parachutist, died wearing a wingsuit when her parachute failed to open after jumping from Mount Kinesava at Utah's Zion National Park. BASE jumping is not permitted at Zion National Park. Amber's death was the first BASE jumping fatality reported at Zion in the park's history. |
| 26 | 13 March 2014 | Sean "Stanley" Leary | 38 | United States | Prolific climber, adventurer, and BASE jumper, was killed in a BASE jumping accident near Zion National Park, Utah. Leary climbed Yosemite's El Capitan more than 50 times and had set numerous climbing records on that mountain, including setting speed records for climbing the Salathé Wall, with Alex Honnold; and The Nose. Leary's death was the second BASE jumping fatality at Zion. His body was found about 300 feet from the top of West Temple peak and was retrieved by his friend and climbing partner Dean Potter, who would later be killed in a wingsuit accident in 2015. |
| 27 | 29 March 2014 | Dan Vicary | 33 | Switzerland | The three experienced wingsuit flyers jumped from a helicopter over the Lütschental area near Interlaken, Switzerland. They had planned to land in the valley, but took a wrong turn, flew over the wrong ridge, and crashed into an alpine pasture. Vicary and Woerth were found dead; Drake died four days later in hospital. |
| 28 | 29 March 2014 | Ludovic Woerth | 34 | Switzerland | The three experienced wingsuit flyers jumped from a helicopter over the Lütschental area near Interlaken, Switzerland. They had planned to land in the valley, but took a wrong turn, flew over the wrong ridge, and crashed into an alpine pasture. Vicary and Woerth were found dead; Drake died four days later in hospital. |
| 29 | 29 March 2014 | Brian Drake | 33 | Switzerland | The three experienced wingsuit flyers jumped from a helicopter over the Lütschental area near Interlaken, Switzerland. They had planned to land in the valley, but took a wrong turn, flew over the wrong ridge, and crashed into an alpine pasture. Vicary and Woerth were found dead; Drake died four days later in hospital. |
| 30 | 31 March 2014 | Ricki Wüst | 35 | Switzerland | Canadian wingsuit flyer, died in a wingsuit jump from High Nose on the Mürrenfluh in Lauterbrunnen, Switzerland. |
| 31 | 25 May 2014 | Jeff Nebelkopf | 43 | United States | American wingsuit designer and professional stuntman, died in Sebastian, Florida after experiencing trouble with his equipment during a wingsuit jump. He had carried out development work on wingsuits and instructed others in the sport. |
| 32 | 6 June 2014 | Darío Barrio | 42 | Spain | Spanish TV chef, owner of the Madrid restaurant Dassa Bassa and an experienced wingsuit flier, died in an accident while participating in the International Air Festival at Segura de la Sierra in Jaén, a province in southern Spain. Darío was supposed to fly over an old castle but opened his parachute too late, crashing into the cliff where the castle is located. During the event, the wingsuit flyers participated in a tribute to Alvaro Bultó, a wingsuit flyer who died in an accident a year earlier. |
| 33 | 16 August 2014 | Abraham Cubo | 38 | Italy | Experienced Spanish BASE jumper and wingsuit flyer died after hitting rocks when jumping from the Becco dell'Aquila at Monte Brentoni, in northern Italy. |
| 34 | 2 September 2014 | Alex Duncan | 26 | Switzerland | Australian from Manly, Sydney, died after crashing into a mountain during a jump from the Croix de Fer in the Swiss Alps. Duncan had completed over 500 wingsuit jumps prior to his accident. |
| 35 | 14 January 2015 | Josh Sheppard | 31 | United States | Experienced wingsuit flier and skydiver with more than 3,000 jumps, died when his parachute failed to open after he illegally jumped from a Michigan TV tower. |
| 36 | 16 May 2015 | Dean Potter | 43 | United States | Died during an illegal wingsuit flight from Taft Point, in Yosemite National Park. |
| 37 | 16 May 2015 | Graham Hunt | 29 | United States | Died during an illegal wingsuit flight from Taft Point, in Yosemite National Park. |
| 38 | 7 June 2015 | Gabriel Hubert | 40 | Canada | Wingsuit BASE jumper died after crashing into trees when his parachute did not deploy while jumping from Ha Ling Peak in Canmore, Alberta. |
| 39 | 3 July 2015 | Jhonathan Florez | 32 | Switzerland | Colombian, known as "The Birdman", a 2013 wingsuiting world champion, died after falling from the exit point at Engelberg, Switzerland. |
| 40 | 10 July 2015 | Damian Hrdlicka | 52 | Switzerland | American, long-time skydiver and Yahoo-sponsored sky surfer, was found dead with his parachute undeployed approximately two-thirds of the way through his flight path at Gitschen, Switzerland. |
| 41 | 1 October 2015 | Johnny Strange | 23 | Switzerland | American adventurer, crashed into the ground and died after jumping from a 2,000 metre summit in the Swiss canton of Uri. |
| 42 | 12 January 2016 | Mathew Kenney | 29 | United States | Crashed and died while wingsuiting in the Paria Canyon-Vermilion Cliffs Wilderness in northern Arizona. In a 2015 interview, Kenney shared that he had completed over 5,000 successful jumps. |
| 43 | 7 June 2016 | Fernando Brito | 42 | Brazil | Brazilian, died while trying to jump from Pedra da Gávea, Rio de Janeiro. |
| 44 | 9 June 2016 | Dario Zanon | 33 | France | Italian BASE jumper known as "The Great Dario", one of the world's top wingsuit athletes, died on the French side of Mont Blanc Massif after a failed wingsuit flight from the Aiguille du Midi. |
| 45 | 26 June 2016 | Gary Kremer | 30 | Canada | American BASE jumper and former U.S. Marine, died while wingsuit flying with friends in Canada. |
| 46 | 29 June 2016 | John Van Horne | | France | An experienced American BASE jumper died in a wingsuit BASE jump in Brévent, Chamonix, France. |
| 47 | 6 August 2016 | Cameron Minni | 34 | Canada | Experienced wingsuit BASE jumper died while attempting a solo wingsuit jump near Miners Peak on Mount Lawrence Grassi in Alberta, Canada. |
| 48 | 7 August 2016 | David Reader | 25 | France | British BASE jumper died a day after crashing during a wingsuit proximity flight near Sallanches, close to Mont Blanc in the French Alps. His parachute failed to open and he sustained a severe head wound. |
| 49 | 17 August 2016 | Uli Emanuele | 29 | Switzerland | Italian BASE jumper, died in a crash at Lauterbrunnen, Switzerland while shooting a new video. The other fatality was a 49 year-old Briton who jumped from the "High Ultimate" peak at Muerren and who also crashed into a cliff. |
| 50 | 21 August 2016 | Alexander Polli | 31 | France | Italo-Norwegian BASE jumper, died after crashing into a tree at an elevation of 1,500 m near Chamonix, France. |
| 51 | 26 August 2016 | Armin Schmieder | 28 | Switzerland | Italian BASE jumper, died after jumping from Kandersteg, in the Swiss Alps. Schmieder live-streamed his fatal flight on Facebook. |
| 52 | 3 October 2016 | Ratmir Nigimyanov | 30 | France | Russian BASE jumper, died after his parachute failed to open while jumping from Aiguille du Midi above Chamonix, France. Witnesses saw him careening off a rocky outcrop just above the town before crashing into a building site behind the train station. Two days after this incident, the local mayor banned wingsuit flying above Chamonix. |
| 53 | 18 November 2016 | Mehdi Habibi | 38 | Switzerland | Iranian BASE jumper, died after jumping with a wingsuit from the "High Ultimate" in the Lauterbrunnen, Mürren area of the Swiss Alps. He was found dead in rough terrain by a team of Air Glaciers in the afternoon of the same day. His body was subsequently recovered by the rescue team. Before his fatal accident, Habibi completed 4500 skydives, 1000 of those by wingsuit. Of his 800 base jumps, 270 were by wingsuit. |
| 54 | 25 January 2017 | Graham Dickinson | 28 | China | Canadian wingsuit flier, died after attempting a flythrough of "Heaven's Gate" a 130-meter-tall (430 ft) natural cave formation in south China. His body was found on a cliff at the Tianmen Mountain National Forest Park in Zhangjiajie of Hunan Province. Dickinson had BASE jumped from the Peak 2 Peak Gondola in Whistler in February 2014, after which he had to flee Canada once the stunt went viral. |
| 55 | 24 May 2017 | Matthew Ciancio | 42 | United States | American wingsuit skydiver, died after jumping from 13,000 feet in California as part of a wingsuit formation with "four or five" other people. Ciancio reportedly failed to follow correct emergency procedure to release his main parachute after it did not deploy correctly. Witnesses said he waited too long to release his main parachute and switch to his backup parachute. |
| 56 | 28 June 2017 | Micah Couch | 33 | Norway | Skydiving instructor, American resident of Dubai, wingsuit flyer, and Red Bull Aces wingsuit competitor, died during a wingsuit BASE jump in Aurland Municipality, Norway. Witnesses reported that his parachute failed to open, causing him to crash into the base of the mountain. |
| 57 | 6 July 2017 | David Bugnion | 30 | France | Swiss national, died after his parachute failed to open during a wingsuit flight in Haute Savoie in France. |
| 58 | 11 November 2017 | Valery Rozov | 52 | Nepal | Russian climb jumper, died while jumping with a wingsuit from a height of 6,812 meters (22,349 ft) off Ama Dablam mountain in Nepal. According to members of his group, Rozov crashed into the side of the mountain. |
| 59 | 22 January 2018 | Aime-Jean St. Hilaire-Adam | 27 | United States | Competitive skydiver from Calgary, was killed while participating in the World Open Wingsuit Championships after he collided with another jumper, lost consciousness, failed to open his parachute, and crashed onto a roof in Perris, California. |
| 60 | 31 May 2018 | Óscar Cacho | 49 | Spain | Civil guardsman died after a crash from a wingsuit BASE jump in Punta Calva, near Plan, Aragon, Spain. He was one of the first to jump from this area. |
| 61 | 15 June 2018 | Reginald Hurlbut | 68 | United States | Record-holding wingsuit flyer, Hurlbut died in Illinois while practicing for a world record attempt formation wingsuit jump. Hurlbut had taken part in numerous formation flying jumps before, and was a veteran of over 5,000 skydives. |
| 62 | 24 June 2018 | Robert Haggarty | 47 | Italy | British BASE jumper, lost control during a wingsuit jump, and suffered fatal head and chest injuries in the Italian Dolomites. His accident was witnessed by Dr. Angelo Grubisic, who would lose his life in a wingsuit accident a year later. |
| 63 | 27 July 2018 | Mike Racicot | 37 | Switzerland | Canadian, known as "Treehouse Mike", died on a wingsuit flight when his parachute failed to deploy jumping from the Hinterrugg in Switzerland. The experienced BASE jumper made 969 jumps, including from the, KL Tower and lived off grid in a secret tree house he built on Blackcomb Mountain in Whistler, B.C. |
| 64 | 27 July 2018 | Nicolas Galy | 40 | France | Was killed 20 seconds into his jump over Bouloc-en-Quercy in France when he was struck by the plane he jumped from. The plane's pilot was later charged and found guilty of involuntary manslaughter. |
| 65 | 8 June 2019 | Jean Andre Quemener | 32 | Italy | From Jersey, was blown into a rock face after jumping off a 3,000 m peak in the Italian Dolomites and fell to his death. |
| 66 | 30 July 2019 | Jon Malmberg | 52 | Switzerland | Experienced kitesurfer and paraglider with 140 BASE jumps and 300 skydives, died in Lauterbrunnen, Switzerland, while wingsuit flying, supposedly from pulling his pilot chute too slowly. At the time of his accident, he was wearing a "tracking" wingsuit, designed to prevent slow pulls and save lives. |
| 67 | 20 August 2019 | Dr. Angelo Grubisic | 38 | Saudi Arabia | Serbian-British wingsuit champion and astronautical engineer, died on a planned BASE jumping accident in Saudi Arabia. Grubisic had been leader of Southampton University's wingsuit design team and had set up a project to design a safer suit that could break records. |
| 68 | 12 May 2020 | An Liu (刘安) | 24 | China | Chinese university student, disappeared in Tianmen Mountain National Forest Park, Hunan Province, after jumping from a helicopter at a height of 2,500 m. Her body was found on 18 May 2020. She was an experienced wingsuit skydiver with more than 500 flights. |
| 69 | 9 September 2020 | David Wall | 34 | Switzerland | Wingsuit pilot, died when he crashed during a flight in the Churfirsten mountain range in Switzerland. The American jumped from the Sputnik point on the Hinterrugg, a well-known BASE jump location. |
| 70 | 17 November 2020 | Vince Reffet | 36 | United Arab Emirates | "Jetman" pilot, died during a training flight with his jet-powered wingsuit in Dubai. |
| 71 | 7 January 2022 | James Richard Pouchert | 55 | United States | Professional BASE jumping instructor, died in a wingsuit flight from a cliff overlooking Professor Valley in Moab, Utah. Pouchert had completed thousands of jumps during his 20 years of skydiving and 14 years of BASE jumping. Several years before his death, he narrowly avoided a serious accident while wingsuiting when he accidentally jumped without a pilot chute. He and wife Marta were profiled alongside other BASE jumping couples in the 2024 National Geographic documentary Fly. |
| 72 | 2 June 2022 | Matthew Glen Munting | 35 | Italy | Australian with over 400 successful wingsuit jumps, died instantly from ground impact while jumping from Mount Cimone. |
| 73 | 3 June 2022 | Dylan Roberts | 33 | Italy | Experienced wingsuiter died after parachute failed to open while performing a group BASE jump from Mount Brento in Italy's Trentino-Alto Adige region. |
| 74 | 18 July 2022 | Chris Byrnes | 34 | Switzerland | Champion Australian wingsuit racer, died in a wingsuit accident at Schynige Platte, Switzerland. At the time of his death, Byrnes held many FAI world records for wingsuit flying, including fastest speed, longest time, and greatest horizontal distance. |
| 75 | 21 July 2022 | Jonathan Trango | 45 | Italy | Spanish mountaineer and wingsuit BASE jumper died after crashing near the Aiguille Croux, near Mont Blanc in the Italian Alps. |
| 76 | 3 August 2022 | Gleison Barion | 47 | Switzerland | Experienced Brazilian wingsuit flyer and BASE jumper died after crashing to the ground shortly after jumping from the "High Tranch" site near Walenstadt, Switzerland. |
| 77 | 29 October 2022 | Anatoly Vasilevich Uzun | 55 | Italy | Russian wingsuit flyer died after crashing into a rockface while wingsuit BASE jumping from Mount Tofino in the Italian Dolomites. |
| 78 | 4 January 2023 | Jarno Cordia | 44 | Switzerland | Dutch wingsuit flyer, died BASE jumping with a wingsuit near Lauterbrunnen, Switzerland. After jumping from a sheer cliff at Hig La Mousse, he crashed into a rock wall several times. |
| 79 | 26 February 2023 | Kali Alecia Turner | 33 | Brazil | American wingsuit flyer, died in a wingsuit accident while jumping from Pedra dos Cabritos in Castelo, Brazil. She fell approximately 800 meters and died upon impact after her equipment malfunctioned. Turner made her first wingsuit base jump two days before her death. |
| 80 | 5 May 2023 | Álex Villar | 34 | Spain | Professional BASE jumper, died while participating in a competition at Punta Calva, Huesca, Spain. The accident took place from the same BASE jumping spot where his friend Óscar Cacho was fatally injured in 2018. |
| 81 | 3 June 2023 | Mark Andrews | 65 | Italy | Retired engineer from Cornwall died after falling 400 meters down a rock face at Val Trementina in the Dolomites while wearing a wing suit. Andrews made nearly 600 jumps since beginning the sport in 2014. |
| 82 | 10 June 2023 | Dominik Ertl | 42 | Switzerland | Experienced wingsuit flyer, died in a crash landing in Walenstadt Sputnik, Switzerland. He had "nearly 2,000 jumps under his belt over the past 10 years". The Austrian lost speed after performing a corkscrew maneuver, and initiated a flare that caused further deceleration, as opposed to gaining altitude. After two failed attempts to pull his parachute cord, he was successful on the third attempt. However, it was too late and he "[impacted] in a horizontal body position." Ertl documented his wingsuit flights on camera, which he posted on his YouTube channel. |
| 83 | 6 September 2023 | Francis Jay Driscoll | 38 | Italy | Australian wingsuiter and BASE jumper died when he crash landed 200 meters below a BASE jump launch point in the Tofane mountain range, near Cortina d'Ampezzo, Italy. |
| 84 | 10 September 2023 | Dennis Ploner | 29 | Italy | Italian wingsuiter died approximately five seconds into a jump from the ruins of Castel Greifenstein, outside of Bolzano, Italy. |
| 85 | 6 October 2023 | Reed Smith | 44 | Switzerland | Experienced American skydiver, wingsuiter and BASE jumper died after crashing during a wingsuit BASE jump from Scex Rouge, Vaud, Switzerland. |
| 86 | 27 January 2024 | Gregory Coates | 36 | United States | Wingsuiter participating in a jump with Mile-Hi skydiving died in Longmont, Colorado after his parachutes failed to deploy. |
| 87 | 21 February 2024 | Alessandro Fiorito | 62 | Italy | Experienced Italian skydiver, BASE jumper and wingsuit flyer fell 300 meters to his death as his wingsuit began to spin in Abbadia Lariana, on the banks of Lake Como. |
| 88 | 12 June 2024 | Trevor Bockstahler | 30 | India | American wingsuit BASE jumper died while jumping alone in India's Spiti Valley. The circumstances of his death are unknown. |
| 89 | 7 August 2024 | Raian Kamel | 36 | Italy | BASE jumper crashed against ice at an altitude of 2,400 meters in Val Badia. |
| 90 | 10 August 2024 | Ludovico Vanoli | 41 | Italy | Entrepreneur and experienced Italian BASE jumper and wingsuit flyer crashed against rocks during a jump near Monte Civetta. |
| 91 | 30 September 2024 | Jonathan Bizilia | 27 | United States | Experienced BASE jumper and skydiving influencer fatally crashed in “extremely rugged terrain” during a wingsuit jump in Box Elder County, Utah. |
| 92 | 21 June 2025 | Liam Byrne | 24 | Switzerland | Scottish wingsuit champion, fatally injured on Gitschen, in the Swiss Alps, after taking off from 7,874 ft (2,400m). |
| 93 | 1 July 2025 | Carlos Suarez | 52 | Spain | 3-time Spanish climbing champion died during a wingsuit jump from a balloon in La Villa de Don Fadrique while filming the movie "La Fiera". |
| 94 | 18 August 2025 | Kirk Hawkins | 58 | Switzerland | Former U.S. Air Force F-16 pilot who cofounded ICON Aircraft in 2006 to build a light sport amphibious plane, died during a wingsuit jump in the Swiss Alps, according to his longtime business partner and former friend. |
| 95 | 5 January 2026 | Brendan Weinstein | 34 | South Africa | Veteran American BASE jumper was said to be highly experienced, having completed 1,600 wingsuit flights, 1,000 parachute jumps and 800 BASE jumps. Died in a wingsuit accident in Platteklip Gorge of Table Mountain National Park. |
| 96 | 7 February 2026 | Pierre Wolnik | 37 | France | French two-time wingsuit world champion (2022, 2024) and member of France's team at the 2026 World Air Sports Federation world championships. Died after a wingsuit jump from a helicopter near Mont Blanc when his parachute did not open. |
| 97 | 28 February 2026 | Chas McNeil | 49 | England | Experienced skydiver died while wingsuit flying at Dunkeswell Aerodrome. |
