= Johnny Strange (adventurer) =

American adventurer

- Born: John Robert Strange; December 26, 1991; Malibu, California
- Died: October 1, 2015 (aged 23); Uri, Switzerland
- Parent(s): Brian Strange; Dianette Wells

John Robert "Johnny" Strange (December 26, 1991 – October 1, 2015) was a world record holding adventurer. At 17, he became the youngest to climb the Seven Summits, a record now held by Jordan Romero at 15 years, 5 months and 12 days. He was also a professional wingsuit BASE jumper.

Strange was from Malibu, CA. His father Brian Strange and his mother Dianette Wells are both adventurers who have climbed Mount Everest.

His first climb, at age 12, was Vinson Massif in Antarctica. Following that, he climbed Mount Everest, Mount Kosciuszko, Mount Elbrus, Kilimanjaro, Denali, and Aconcagua, reached the South Pole, and skydived into the North Pole.

In September 2010, Strange was with a team of three others who BASE jumped into the Grand Canyon. Their planned exit path was blocked and they were stranded without food or water. They survived two nights in the canyon before free climbing out.

Johnny was awarded the honour of "Young Champion" in 2010 at the inaugural Youth Olympic Games in Singapore and attended at the "What Makes A Young Champion?" event.

== Death ==
On September 28, 2015, Strange called in to "Kevin & Bean" on KROQ from Switzerland to say he was shooting a dangerous video where "we fly super close to stuff." Three days later, Strange fell to his death in a wingsuit accident after jumping from Gitschen near Lake Lucerne. A paddle-out memorial was held for Strange near his home at Zuma Beach on October 4, 2015.

== See also ==
- List of fatalities due to wingsuit flying
