= Brunnistock =

Mountain in Switzerland

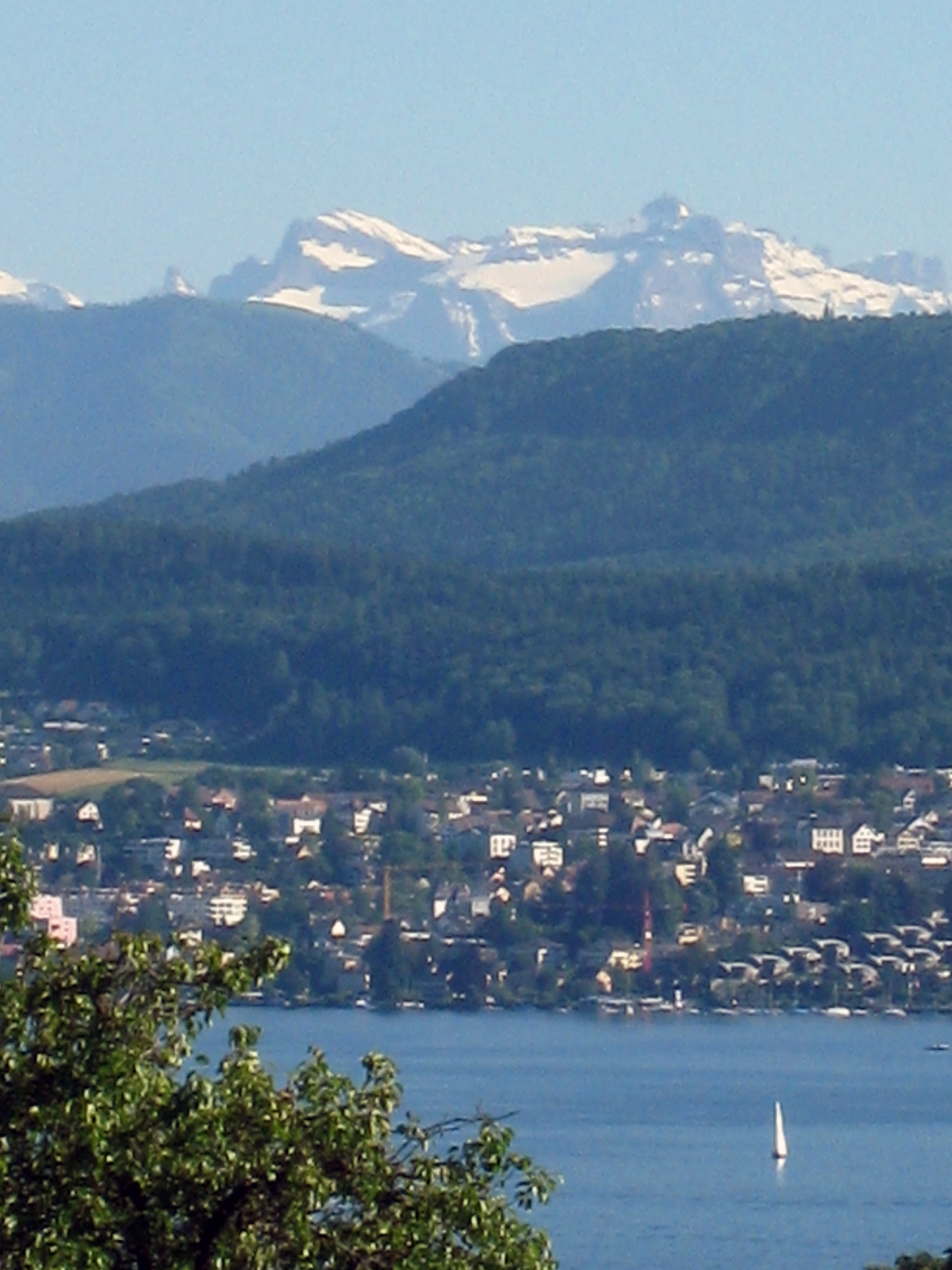
- Brunnistock (right hand summit) with Lake Zurich in the foreground

Highest point
- Elevation: 2,952 m (9,685 ft)
- Prominence: 661 m (2,169 ft)
- Parent peak: Titlis
- Coordinates: 46°50′51.7″N 8°32′59.9″E

Geography
- Location within Switzerland Location within Canton of Uri
- Country: Switzerland
- Canton: Uri
- Parent range: Urner Alps

The Brunnistock is a mountain of the Urner Alps, overlooking the eastern side of the Surenen Pass, in the Swiss canton of Uri. With a height of 2,952 metres (9,685 ft) above sea level, the Brunnistock is the highest mountain of the range lying north of the Surenen Pass. On the north-west side lies a glacier named Blüemlisalpfirn.

The closest locality is Attinghausen on the eastern foot of the mountain.

== See also ==
- List of mountains of Uri
