= Dean Potter =

American climber and BASE jumper (1972–2015)

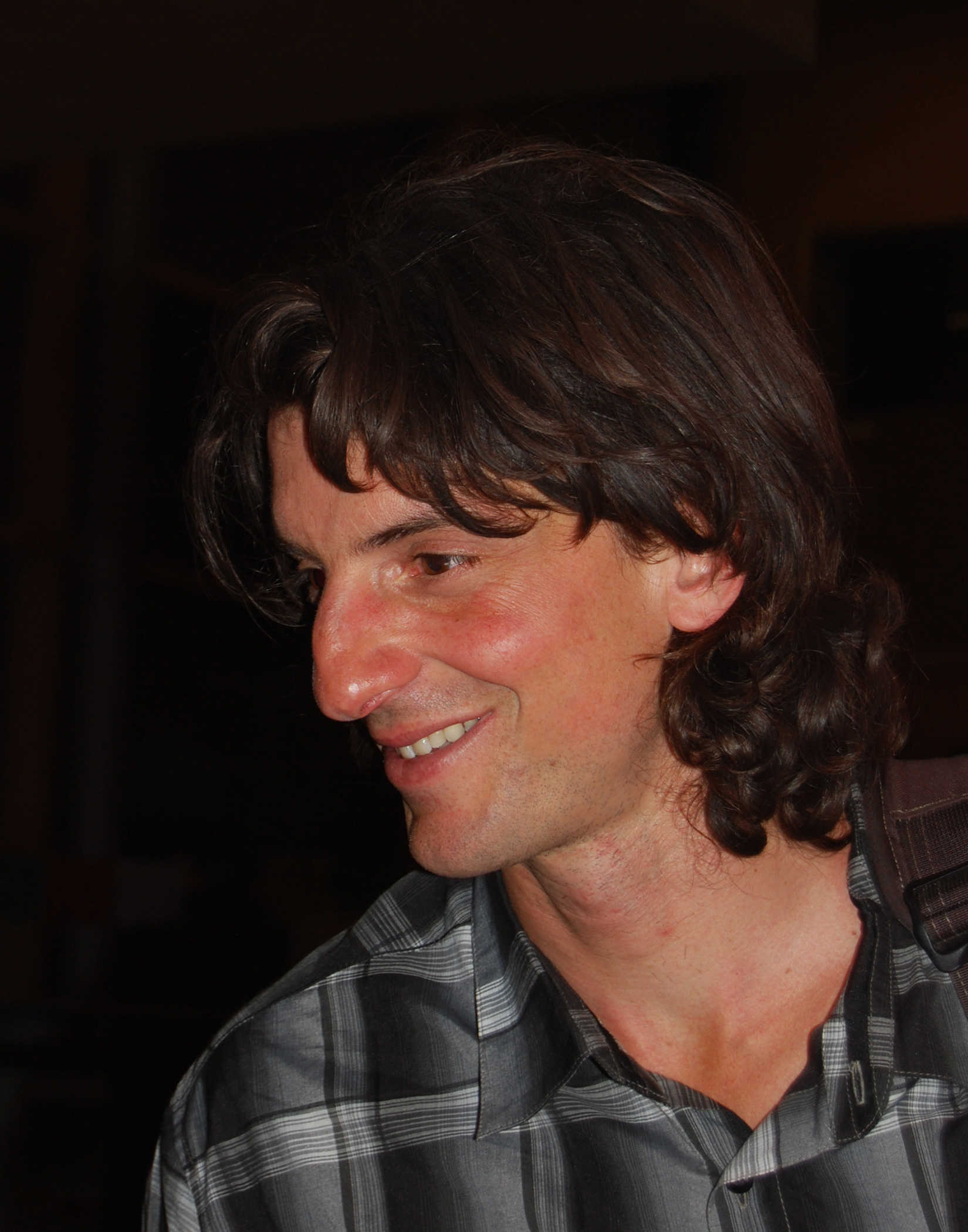
- Potter on August 28, 2009

Personal information
- Born: Dean Spaulding Potter; April 14, 1972 Fort Leavenworth, Kansas, U.S.
- Died: May 16, 2015 (aged 43) Yosemite National Park, California
- Cause of death: Wingsuit flying accident
- Occupation: Rock climber
- Height: 1.96 m (6 ft 5 in)
- Spouse: Steph Davis (m. 2002; div. 2010)

Climbing career
- Type of climber: Free solo climbing; Big wall climbing; Speed climbing; Aid climbing; Alpine climbing; Sport climbing; Traditional climbing; Bouldering
- Highest grade: Redpoint: 5.13d (8b); Bouldering: V11 (8A); Free solo: 5.12d (7c)
- Known for: Pioneer of BASE jumping and highlining; Inventor of FreeBASE

Dean Spaulding Potter (April 14, 1972 – May 16, 2015) was an American rock climber, alpinist, BASE jumper, and highliner, who invented the extreme sport of FreeBASE. He completed many technically hard first free ascents, free solo ascents, speed ascents, and enchainments in Yosemite National Park and in Patagonia. He won the Laureus World Action Sportsperson of the Year award in 2003. In 2015, he died in a wingsuit flying accident at Yosemite National Park.

== Early life ==
Dean Potter was born in 1972 to an Army officer in a military hospital at Fort Leavenworth, Kansas and grew up in New Boston, New Hampshire. His parents divorced in 1979, when he was 7. He taught himself to climb when he was in 10th grade in southern New Hampshire. He attended the University of New Hampshire, where he rowed varsity crew. Potter quit college and pursued his passion for climbing.

== Climbing career ==
=== Free solo climbing ===
Potter climbed many new routes and completed many solo ascents in Yosemite (e.g., Separate Reality) and in Patagonia. He free-solo climbed a small part of El Capitan in Yosemite, where he pioneered a route he called Easy Rider by climbing down the slabby upper pitches of the route Lurking Fear (hardest moves rated grade 5.10a) and then traversed Thanksgiving Ledge to complete the last six pitches and six hundred feet of the route Free Rider (5.11d, two 5.10ds, 5.10b, 5.10a and 5.7). This was the first major section of El Capitan to be free soloed, but his path avoided the significantly more challenging climbing on what is the easiest way up El Capitan below (several 5.12 pitches, with difficulty up to 5.12d on Free Rider).

=== Big wall climbing ===
In July 2006, Potter climbed The Reticent Wall, one of the hardest big wall aid climbing routes on El Capitan in Yosemite Valley, in 34 hours and 57 minutes with Ammon McNeely and Ivo Ninov, slashing five days off the existing time. Potter and Sean Leary set a new speed record for climbing up The Nose of El Capitan in November 2010. They ascended the 31-pitch route in 2 hours, 36 minutes, 45 seconds. This was twenty seconds quicker than the existing record, set the previous October by Yuji Hirayama and Hans Florine.

=== Delicate Arch climb ===
Controversy surrounded Potter after his 2006 climb of Delicate Arch in Arches National Park, for which he lost his sponsorship from the Patagonia clothing company. "There wasn't any legal reason for me not to climb it," Potter said of Delicate Arch, despite well-established tradition forbidding climbing named features in the park. Potter's actions exploited vague language as a loophole, which has since been changed to enforce a blanket ban on the activity within Arches National Park. Potter had previously created conflict with Park authorities by slacklining between the Three Gossips.

"I didn't see any moral reason not to climb it. I didn't hurt it," he said, though rope grooves in the soft sandstone were later found, possibly created or enhanced by the professional photographers Potter brought along to publicize the climb.

Potter said he would not climb Totem Pole, the spire in Monument Valley that Navajo imbue with religious significance. Delicate Arch, despite its prominence on Utah license plates, did not have the stature of the sacred Arizona tower, he said: "I didn't see a reason why it's wrong, why we shouldn't mesh with nature." An account said: "At first Potter's handler at Patagonia spread the word of his climb by calling the Salt Lake Tribune. Public outrage was immediate, though, especially in Utah, where many see Delicate Arch as a symbol for the state's wild beauty."

Potter's Delicate Arch climb was memorialized in hip hop artist Kris "Odub" Hampton's song "Not All Roses," which chronicles the controversy surrounding the climb. Odub's later "Cease and Desist" responds to the cease-and-desist order that Potter's attorney sent the artist in response to "Not All Roses."

== Other extreme sports ==
Potter was also known for highlining and for his BASE jumping. He was introduced to slacklining by Charles Victor Tucker III, known as "Chongo", one of the first three people to highline across Lost Arrow Spire. Potter completed a variety of highline-crossings without the benefit of a safety climbing lanyard, backup-line, or even a BASE jumping parachute. Some included lines suspended as much as 3,000 feet (910 m) above the ground in Yosemite National Park.

On August 6, 2008, he completed the first FreeBASE ascent of the 300-metre (980 ft) alpine climbing route, Deep Blue Sea 5.12 (7b/+), on the north face of the Eiger. Potter invented freeBASEing as a combination of free solo climbing (rock climbing without the assistance of ropes), but with a BASE jumping parachute rig attached to the climber's back. In the event of a fall, if sufficiently high above the ground, the climber should have time to open his parachute before hitting the ground and survive.

In 2014, Potter released the film When Dogs Fly, charting the adventures of his hearing dog, Whisper, including parachuting together. The film went viral but was criticised by animal rights campaigners.

== Death ==
On May 16, 2015, Potter and Graham Hunt died attempting a proximity wingsuit flight from Taft Point above Yosemite Valley. The route they were attempting, which they had flown before, required them to clear a small notch in a rocky ridge line. Hunt hit a side wall during the flight while Potter cleared the notch before crashing. Both died on impact. Neither of them had deployed their parachutes. Potter's and Hunt's deaths brought the total number of BASE jumping deaths in U.S. national parks in 2015 to five. Between the years of 2014 and 2019, there were three deaths attributed to BASE jumping in Yosemite, including this incident.

Fellow rock climber Doug Robinson, considered the father of clean climbing in Yosemite, told the BBC that he was "very sad about Dean Potter's death but not very surprised." He said Potter had always sought to take on new challenges, "pushing the envelope all his life."

== The Dark Wizard ==
On April 14, 2026, HBO premiered The Dark Wizard, a four-part documentary series directed by Peter Mortimer and Nick Rosen. The series draws from archival footage, Potter's personal journals and interviews with those who knew him. Dan Deacon's song "When I Was Done Dying" plays at the end of the docuseries.

== Notable ascents ==
- 2002 Supercanaleta, Cerro Fitz Roy, Patagonia. First solo of the big wall route.
- 2003 Concepcion 5.13+ (67m), Day Canyon, Moab, Utah. First ascent.
- 2006 Heaven (5.12d/13a) Glacier Point, Yosemite Valley. First free solo ascent.
- 2006 Southern Belle (14-pitches, 5.12d R/X), Half Dome, Yosemite Valley. Second free ascent of the big wall traditional route with Leo Houlding.
- 2008 Deep Blue Sea (300m, 5.12+), Eiger, Bernese Alps, Switzerland. First FreeBASE ascent of an Eiger alpine climbing route.
- 2010 The Nose, El Capitan, Yosemite. Fastest ascent at the time (2:36:45), record later broken by Alex Honnold and Hans Florine.

== See also ==
- Alex Honnold, free solo climber
- Dan Osman, free solo climber
- List of grade milestones in rock climbing
- History of rock climbing
