= Jeb Corliss =

Professional skydiver and BASE jumper

- Born: March 25, 1976 (age 50); New Mexico, U.S.
- Occupation: Athlete
- Known for: Skydiving and BASE jumping
- Spouse: Aly DeMayo
- Website: jebcorliss.net

Jeb Corliss (born March 25, 1976) is an American professional skydiver and BASE jumper. He has jumped from sites including Paris's Eiffel Tower, Seattle's Space Needle, the Christ the Redeemer statue in Rio de Janeiro and the Petronas Twin Towers in Kuala Lumpur. He lives in Venice, California.

== Early life ==
As a child, Corliss was diagnosed with counterphobia, which causes people to seek out activities they fear to manage anxiety. He jumped off a high-diving board at 18 months old and captured live rattlesnakes outside his family's New Mexico home before he was seven. After getting in fistfights as early as first grade, he was homeschooled.

Corliss said he was suicidal throughout his childhood, leading to his interest in BASE Jumping, which ended up leading to his mental health recovery. "When I started BASE Jumping, all of a sudden I started realizing life isn't just misery. Life isn't just darkness. There's beauty too. Through my search for death, I found my life."

== Professional career ==
=== 1999 ===
In 1999, Corliss had a near-fatal BASE jump into the Howick Falls, in Howick, KwaZulu-Natal Province, South Africa. His parachute opening was asymmetric and he could not avoid flying into the downpouring water.

=== 2003 ===
In October 2003, Corliss was teamed to jump with his best friend, Australian BASE jumper Dwain Weston, at the inaugural Go Fast Games. Corliss was to fly under the Royal Gorge Bridge in Colorado, while Weston was meant to pass over it. Instead, Weston impacted the bridge at an estimated speed of 120 mph (190 km/h) which caused his death. Corliss had to take evasive action to avoid colliding with Weston's body.

=== 2006 ===
In April 2006, Corliss attempted to BASE jump off the observation deck of the Empire State Building, while wearing a camera, but was restrained by building security and arrested by the NYPD. As a result, Corliss received three years' probation and 100 hours' community service, which was at one point overturned by Justice Michael R. Ambrecht of State Supreme Court in Manhattan, on the basis that Corliss "was experienced and careful enough to jump off a building without endangering his own life or anyone else's". This sentence was affirmed in January 2009. Corliss was later permanently banned from the Empire State Building.

=== 2009 ===
In 2009, UK's Channel 4 television documentary Daredevils: The Human Bird focused on explaining Corliss's daredevil attitude in facing his fears and culminated in a dramatic leap in a wingsuit from a helicopter 180 meters (590 feet) over the Matterhorn with a flight that brought him within a meter or so (several feet) of the summit which he maintained down the entire 900 meters (3,000 feet) descent off the ridge.

=== 2011 ===
On September 25, 2011, Corliss jumped out of a helicopter at 1,800 meters (5,900 feet) and glided through a 30 meters (98 feet) wide archway in Tianmen Mountain in Zhangjiajie, Hunan Province, China, landing with a parachute on a nearby bridge.

=== 2012 ===
On January 16, 2012, in an accident while proximity flying off Table Mountain, Cape Town, South Africa, Corliss broke both ankles, three toes, and a fibula, tore his left Anterior cruciate ligament, and sustained a gash in his skin that required skin grafts to close. He struck his legs approximately halfway between the hip and knee on a rock ledge he was attempting to skim over while aiming at a target balloon. The impact caused him to tumble forward one revolution before he regained some control, cleared some additional ledges and then deployed his parachute. Due to the lack of stability, his canopy quickly spun him into the ground. He was airlifted out by the Red Cross Air Mercy Service. He recovered and returned to base jumping. A video of the accident has been released.

=== 2013 ===
On September 28, 2013, Corliss made a jump called the "flying dagger". He jumped out of a helicopter wearing a wingsuit and then flew through a narrow "crack" in Mount Jianglang in China. The fissure is approximately 18 meters (59 feet) across at the top, 45 meters (148 feet) across at the bottom, and over 270 meters (890 feet) tall. After safely completing the jump, Corliss was quoted saying that it was "...the single gnarliest thing I've ever done..." and "I have never experienced anything so hardcore. Period. I have not been that scared in my life. It was so powerful and overwhelming. I started crying..."

=== 2016 ===
Corliss was the technical adviser for the wingsuit flying stunts featured in the 2015 release Point Break, an action thriller film remake, in which he briefly appears.

In 2015 Corliss said "I know 100 percent that this sport is going to kill me. That makes me take it very seriously."

== Media career and other ventures ==
Corliss was also the original host of the Discovery Channel series Stunt Junkies, appearing in 12 episodes, but was fired by Discovery after the surreptitious 2006 attempt to BASE jump the Empire State Building, which was performed against the network's advice.

Corliss is a co-founder of 3 Triple 7, a clothing label.
