= Gitschen =

Mountain in Switzerland

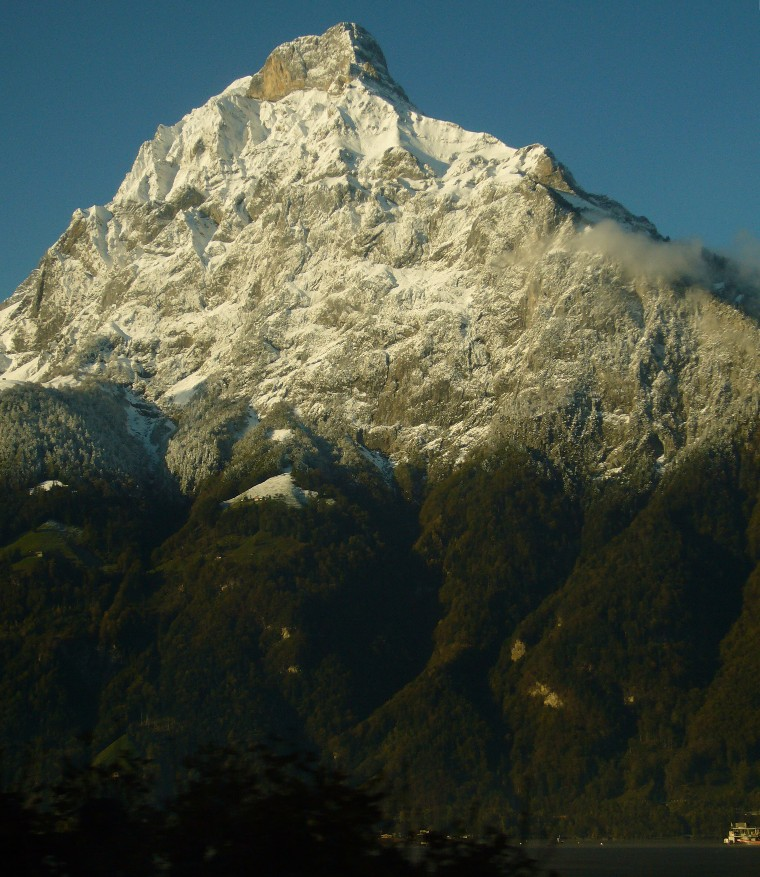
- The east face

Highest point
- Elevation: 2,513 m (8,245 ft)
- Prominence: 73 m (240 ft)
- Parent peak: Brunnistock
- Coordinates: 46°52′37.3″N 8°34′31.2″E

Geography
- Location within Switzerland Location within Canton of Uri
- Country: Switzerland
- Canton: Uri
- Parent range: Urner Alps

The Gitschen (2,513 m [8,245 ft]) is a mountain of the Urner Alps, overlooking Lake Lucerne in the canton of Uri, Switzerland. It lies on the range north of the Surenen Pass, culminating at the Brunnistock.

== See also ==
- List of mountains of Uri
