= Dwain Weston =

Australian skydiver

Dwain Weston (31 January 1973 – 5 October 2003) was an Australian skydiver, BASE jumper, wingsuiter and software developer. On 5 October 2003, at the end of the inaugural Go Fast Games, Weston died while attempting to fly over the Royal Gorge Bridge near Cañon City, Colorado, United States.

== BASE jumping career ==
Weston, who was originally from Sydney, Australia, worked as a software developer and was a skilled gymnast and surfer. In 2002, he won the world title in BASE jumping. He served as president of the Australian BASE Association (ABA). He was among the first BASE jumpers to introduce acrobatic elements into the jumps, and was a pioneer of various jumping techniques. Shortly before his death, Weston was hired by Boeing Defense, Space & Security for classified work developing satellite software.

== Death ==
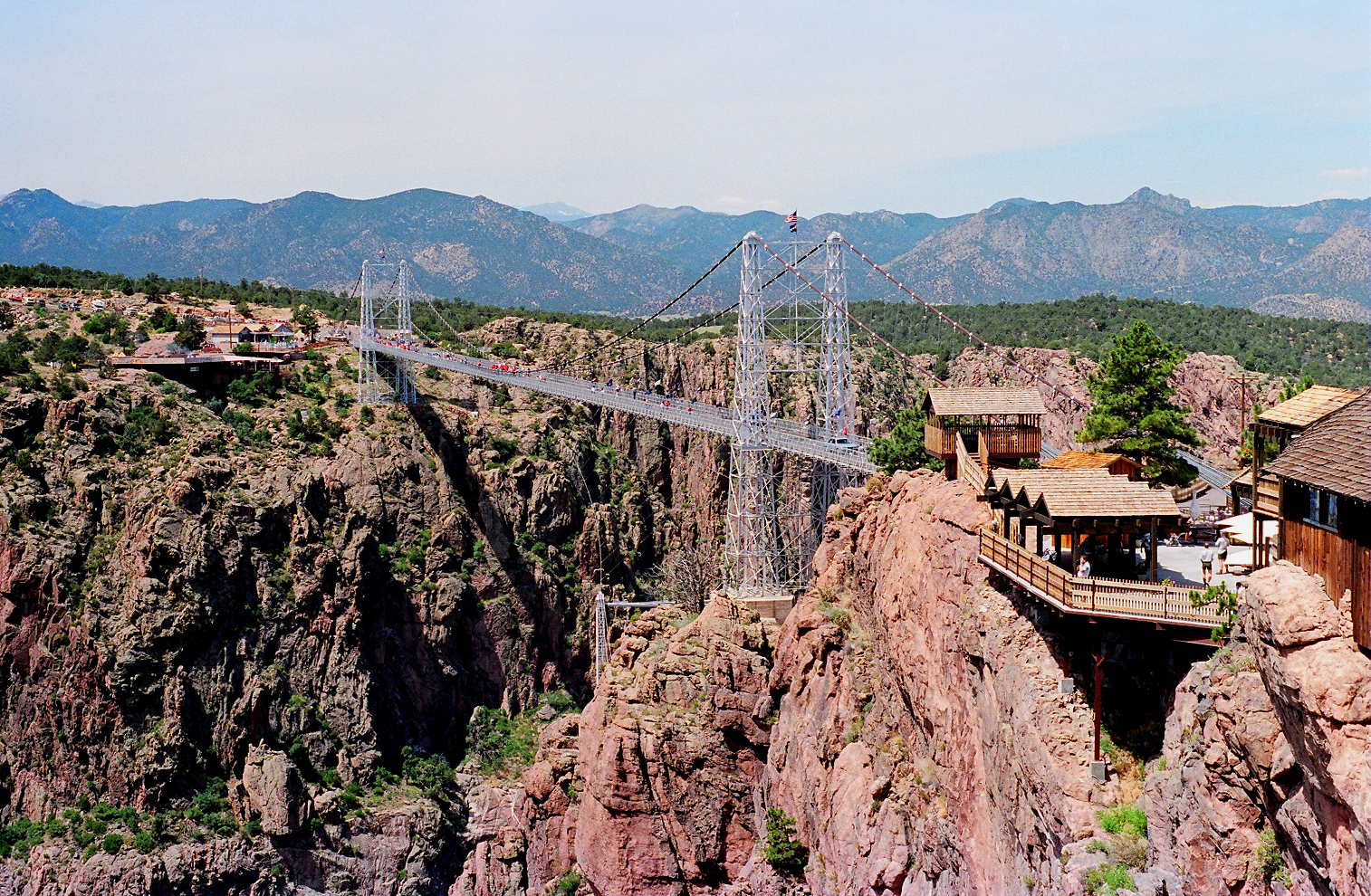
The Royal Gorge Bridge

On 5 October 2003, at the end of the inaugural Go Fast Games, Weston was killed while attempting to fly over the Royal Gorge Bridge near Cañon City, Colorado. Weston was wearing a wingsuit, a skydiving suit with fabric extended below the arms to the body and between the legs to catch air allowing for horizontal travel when skydiving. Weston was to go over the bridge while fellow skydiver Jeb Corliss was to go under it. Just prior to the jump, Weston said to Corliss, "Just remember: whatever happens, happens."

Miscalculating the winds and his distance from the bridge, Weston struck a railing while traveling at an estimated 120 miles per hour (190 km/h), severing one of his legs. After the impact with the bridge, Weston's parachute deployed and he fell onto a rock face about 300 feet (91 m) from the bottom of the gorge, where he bled to death. Spectators on the bridge witnessed and filmed the event, capturing the reaction of the crowd and the damage to the bridge.

== Prizes ==
- World BASE Cup 2002 (Kuala Lumpur, Malaysia)
- Xtreme Skydive - World Base Cup 2003 Championship (Kuala Lumpur, Malaysia, 6 January 2003)
