= Stunt Junkies =

American television series

Stunt Junkies is a Discovery Channel television series that presents professional athletes performing dangerous stunts. The show demonstrates all the steps the athlete must do to successfully complete the stunt. Stunt Junkies was created and executive produced by Jordan G. Stone and produced by CBS Eye Too Productions. The series lasted two seasons and 43 episodes.

The first 13 episodes were hosted by Jeb Corliss. Corliss was dismissed in the summer of 2006 after being arrested for attempting to BASE jump from the observation deck of the Empire State Building in New York City. The second season and next 30 episodes were hosted by Eli Thompson, a world champion skydiver with over 15,000 skydives, including the opening aerial stunt for Austin Powers in Goldmember.

Stunt Junkies shows such stunts as Bob Burnquist 50-50 a rail over the Grand Canyon and then BASE jumping to the bottom, and a man trying to backflip a Ski-Doo on a wave. TMBA, a New York City animation studio, created 3D animations of the "physics behind the stunts", designed to explain the science behind each stunt. Motion graphics were layered on top of 3D re-creations of each event, allowing producers to highlight the riskiest aspects of each stunt.
