= Sentinel Dome =

Granite dome in Yosemite National Park, USA

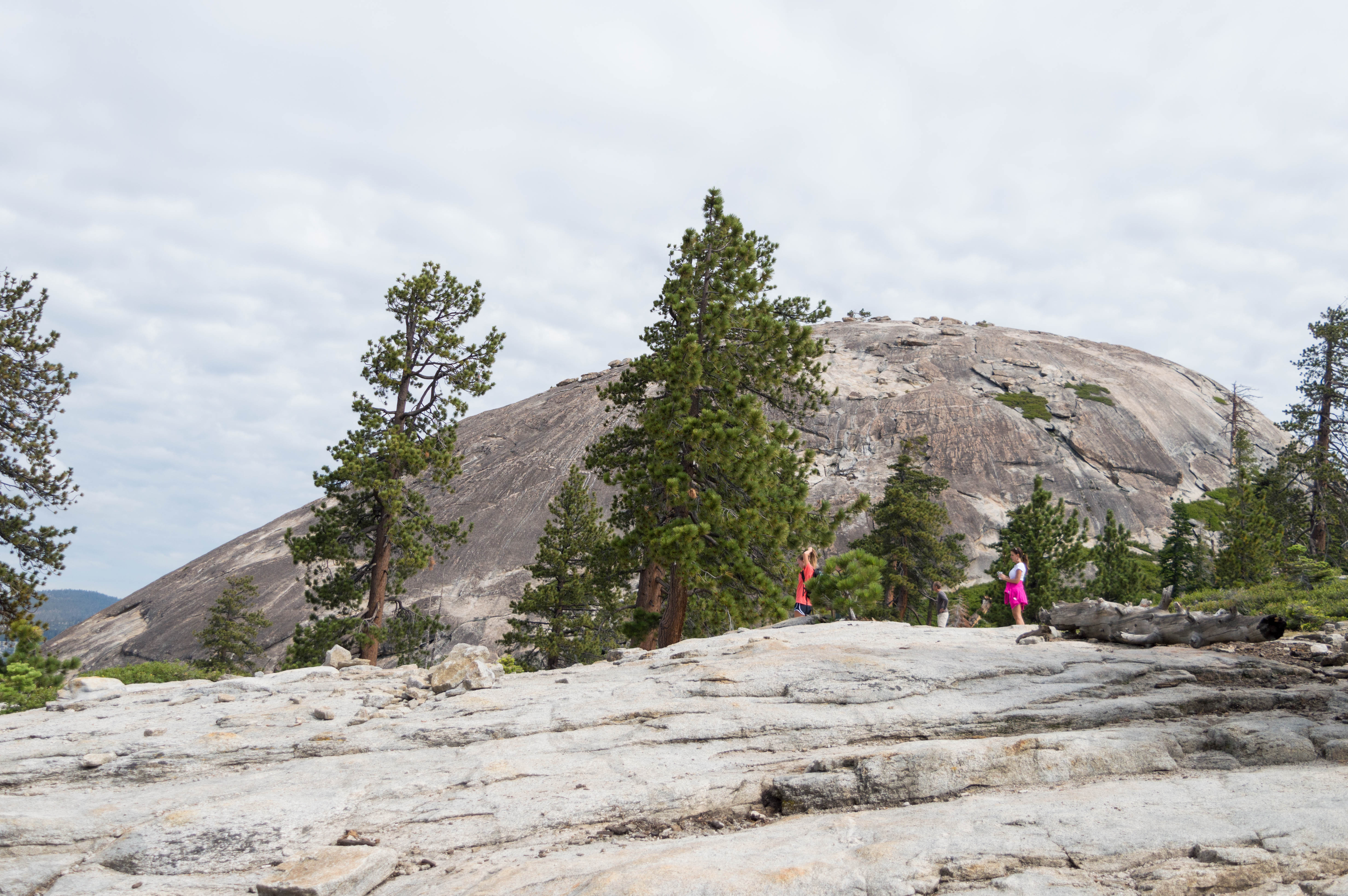
- Sentinel Dome

Highest point
- Elevation: 8,127 ft (2,477 m) NAVD 88
- Prominence: 322 ft (98 m)
- Parent peak: Illilouette Ridge
- Coordinates: 37°43′23″N 119°35′03″W

Geography
- Location within California Location within the United States
- Location: Yosemite National Park, Mariposa County, California, U.S.
- Parent range: Sierra Nevada
- Topo map: USGS Half Dome

Geology
- Rock age: Cretaceous
- Mountain type: Granite dome

Climbing
- Easiest route: Hike up northeast slope.

Sentinel Dome is a granite dome in Yosemite National Park, United States. It lies on the south wall of Yosemite Valley, 0.8 miles (1.3 km) southwest of Glacier Point and 1.4 miles (2.3 km) northeast of Profile Cliff.

The view from the top offers a 360 degree view of Yosemite Valley and surroundings. One can see Half Dome, El Capitan, Yosemite Falls, North Dome, Basket Dome, and much more. Sentinel Dome provides a 360 degree view of the night sky and it and nearby Glacier Point are popular places for stargazing.

== History ==
The original Native American name of Sentinel Dome, in the Southern Sierra Miwok language, was pronounced "Sak'-ka-du-eh". The Bunnell survey named it "South Dome", but the Whitney survey renamed it Sentinel Dome (from its likeness to a watch-tower).

== Hiking trail ==
The trail to the base of Sentinel Dome is a relatively easy 1.1-mile (1.8 km) hike. The trailhead, the same as the Taft Point trailhead, is located 6 miles (9.7 km) from Bridalveil Creek on the Glacier Point road. Once at the base, hikers traverse the less imposing northeast granite slope to the summit. In winter, Sentinel Dome can be reached from Badger Pass by a 10-miles ski tour.

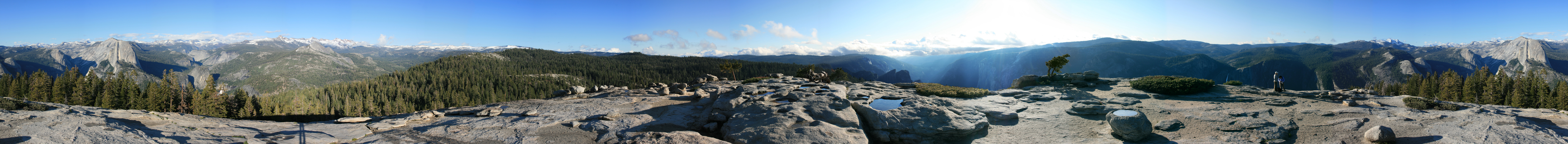
Panoramic view from the top of Sentinel Dome. The Jeffrey Pine is visible at the center, collapsed.

== Jeffrey Pine ==
Sentinel Dome is known for a Jeffrey Pine that grew from its peak. The pine was photographed as early as 1867 by Carleton Watkins, and was the subject of a well-known photograph by Ansel Adams. The tree died during the drought of 1976, but remained standing until August 2003.

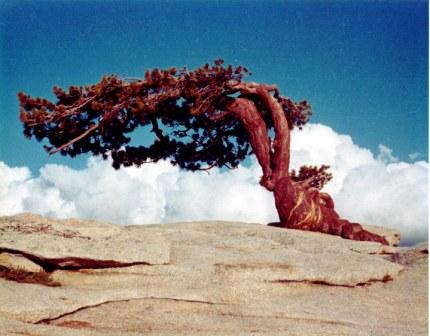
The iconic Jeffrey Pine photographed August 7, 1968

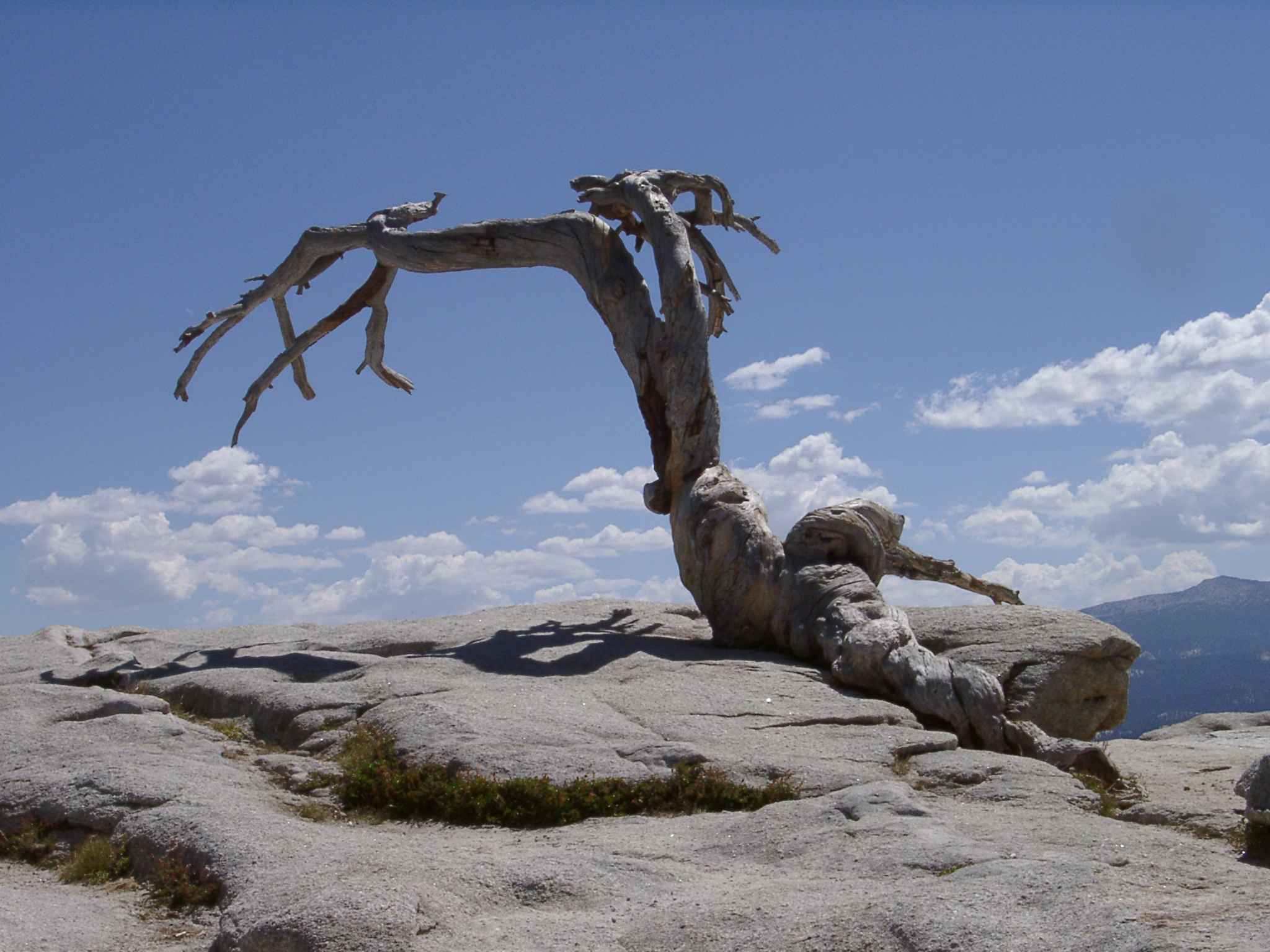
The dead Jeffery Pine in 2001

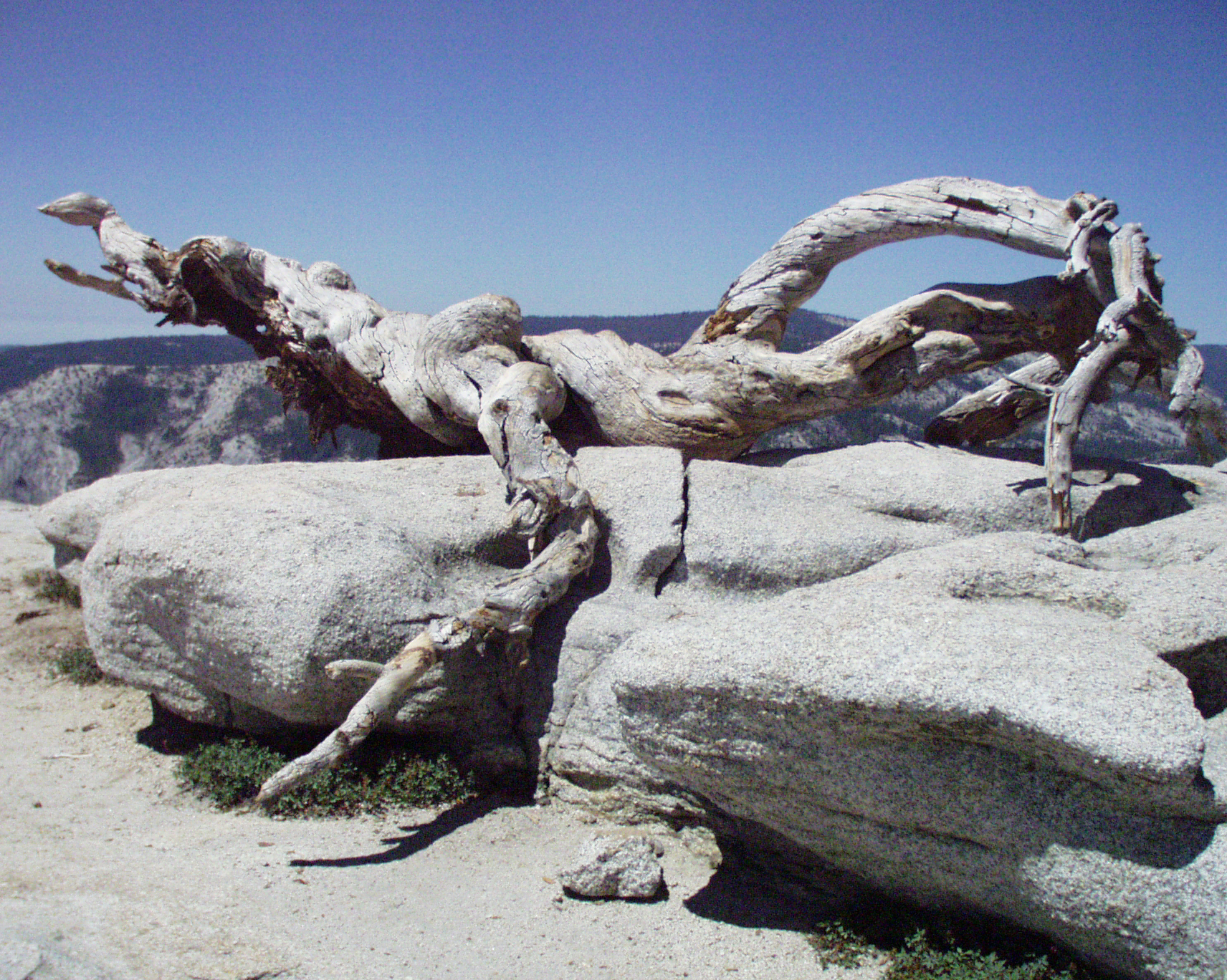
The Jeffrey Pine shortly after it fell in 2003
