= Royal Gorge Bridge =

Tourist attraction near Cañon City, Colorado

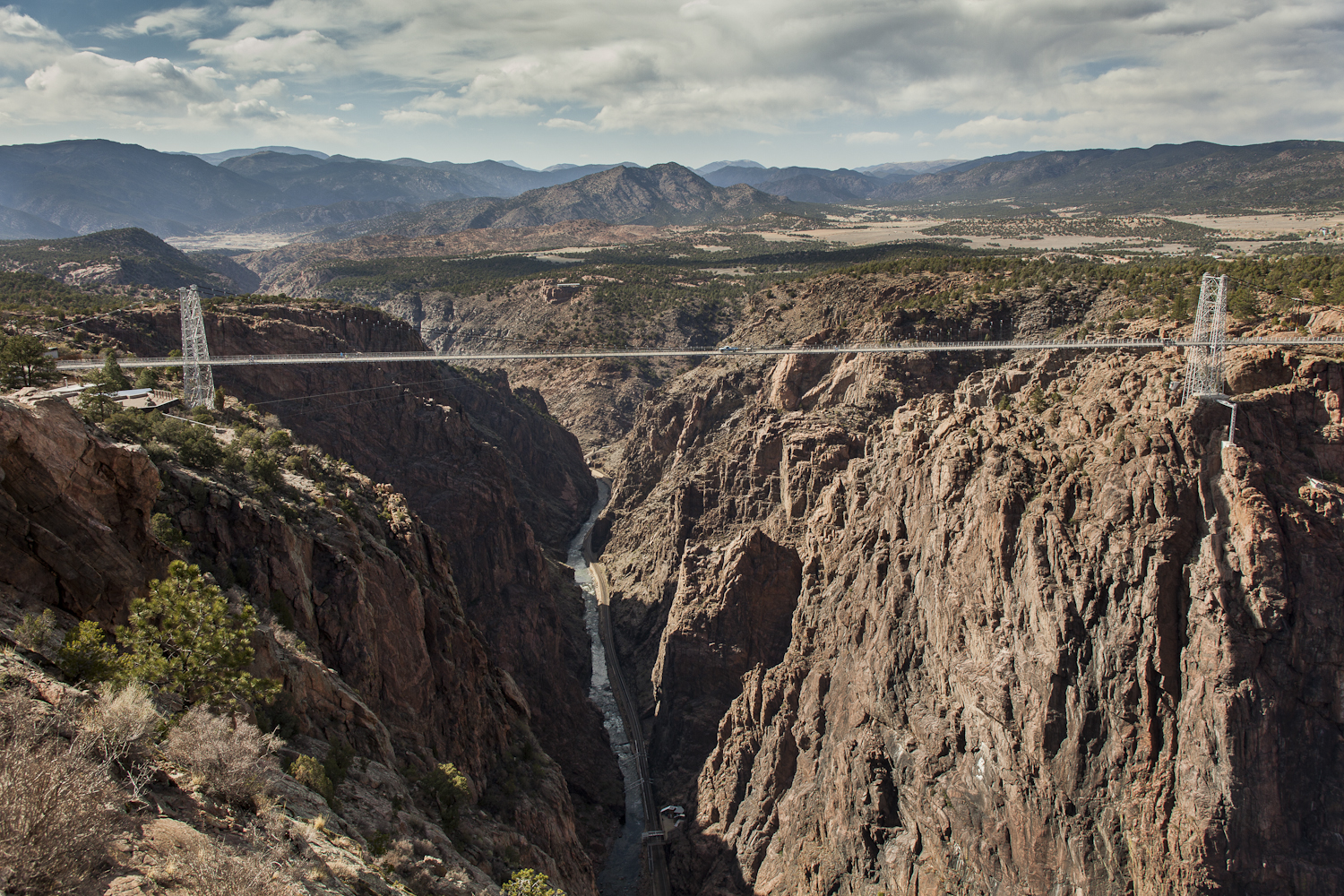
- Coordinates: 38.46167°N 105.325°W
- Carries: Pedestrians
- Crosses: Arkansas River
- Owner: City of Cañon City, Colorado

Characteristics
- Design: Suspension
- Material: Steel with timber deck
- Total length: 1,260 ft (384 m)
- Width: 18 ft (5.5 m)
- Longest span: 880 ft (268 m)
- Load limit: 2,000,000 pounds (910 t)
- Clearance below: 955 ft (291 m) (Note: 1,053 ft (321 m) was the original and long-standing official figure since 1929 for the bridge's height, and the bridge is still listed as "height above valley floor or water 320.95 m" at Structurae.net as of 2016; however, the height figure was officially adjusted twice after an independent laser rangefinder measurement of 955 ft (291 m) was made in 2005. The first official adjustment was to 969 ft (295 m) and then a second adjustment was made to 956 ft (291 m), which is such a negligible difference from 955 ft (291 m) that the latter figure is used throughout this article.)

History
- Designer: George E. Cole
- Constructed by: George E. Cole Construction Co.
- Fabrication by: Colorado Fuel and Iron Corp.
- Construction start: June 5, 1929
- Construction end: November 1929
- Construction cost: $350,000 (equivalent to $5.2 million in 2025 dollars)
- Opened: December 8, 1929
- Royal Gorge Bridge
- U.S. National Register of Historic Places
- NRHP reference No.: 83001303
- Added to NRHP: September 2, 1983

Location
- Interactive map of Royal Gorge Bridge

The Royal Gorge Bridge is a tourist attraction in the United States near Cañon City, Colorado within Royal Gorge Bridge and Park, a 360-acre (150 ha) amusement park located along the edge of the Royal Gorge around both ends of the bridge. The bridge crosses the gorge 955 feet (291 m) above the Arkansas River and held the record of highest bridge in the world from 1929 until 2001 when it was surpassed by the Liuguanghe Bridge in China. The Royal Gorge Bridge maintained the title of the world's highest suspension bridge until the Beipan River Guanxing Highway Bridge was completed in 2003, also in China. The bridge remains the highest bridge in the United States and was among the ten highest bridges in the world until 2012.

The main span of the bridge between the towers is 880 feet (268 m), (Note: The main span measurement on the HighestBridges website is 938 ft (286 m), measured with a laser rangefinder. The main span figure of 880 ft (268 m) continues to be listed on both the Royal Gorge Bridge website and the Structurae.net website.) the total length is 1,260 feet (384 m), the width is 18 feet (5.5 m) and the towers are 150 feet (46 m) high. The steel base structure is covered with 1292 wooden planks.

The bridge was built in six months between June and November 1929 at a cost of $350,000 (equivalent to $5.2 million in 2025 dollars). In 1931, the Incline Railway, or simply the Incline (also known as a funicular), was added beside the bridge to reach the bottom of the gorge. In the 1950s, a miniature railroad was built by the edge of the gorge and an aerial tram was opened in 1969. In the early 1980s, the bridge was renovated with new cable anchors, suspension rods and paint. A Skycoaster attraction was added in 2003, with riders being swung out over the edge of the gorge.

In June 2013, a wildfire destroyed most of the park's buildings and the aerial tram, and damaged the Incline. The bridge sustained only slight damage to the wooden deck and was otherwise undamaged, along with the Skycoaster. The park was rebuilt and partially reopened in August 2014. The park had a grand reopening in May 2015 with new gondolas and a new zip-line crossing the gorge on the east side of the bridge.

== Construction and location ==
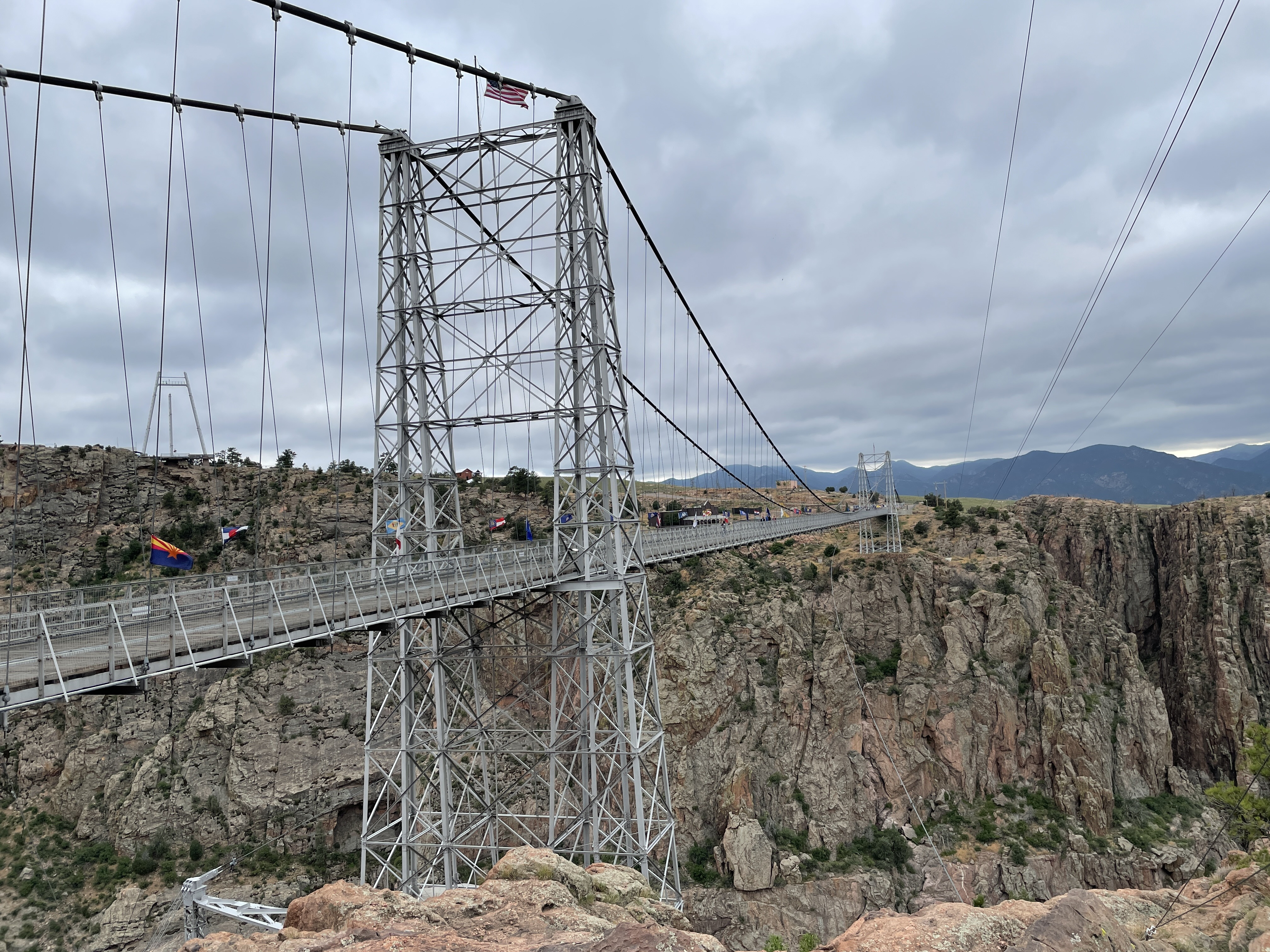
Royal Gorge Bridge from overlook on north side of Royal Gorge

Construction began on June 5, 1929, and ended in November 1929. The bridge cost $350,000 and was constructed as a tourist attraction, not as a through route for transportation purposes. The road leading to the bridge from U.S. Route 50 continues on the south side of the gorge eventually re-connecting with Route 50; however, all visitors are required to enter and exit through the north park gate. Passenger vehicles are not allowed to cross the bridge.

The road leading to and across the bridge from Route 50 is designated as Fremont County Road 3A and begins about 10 mi (16 km) west of Cañon City. The Royal Gorge Route Railroad runs under the bridge along the base of Royal Gorge.

== History ==
=== 1929–1950s ===
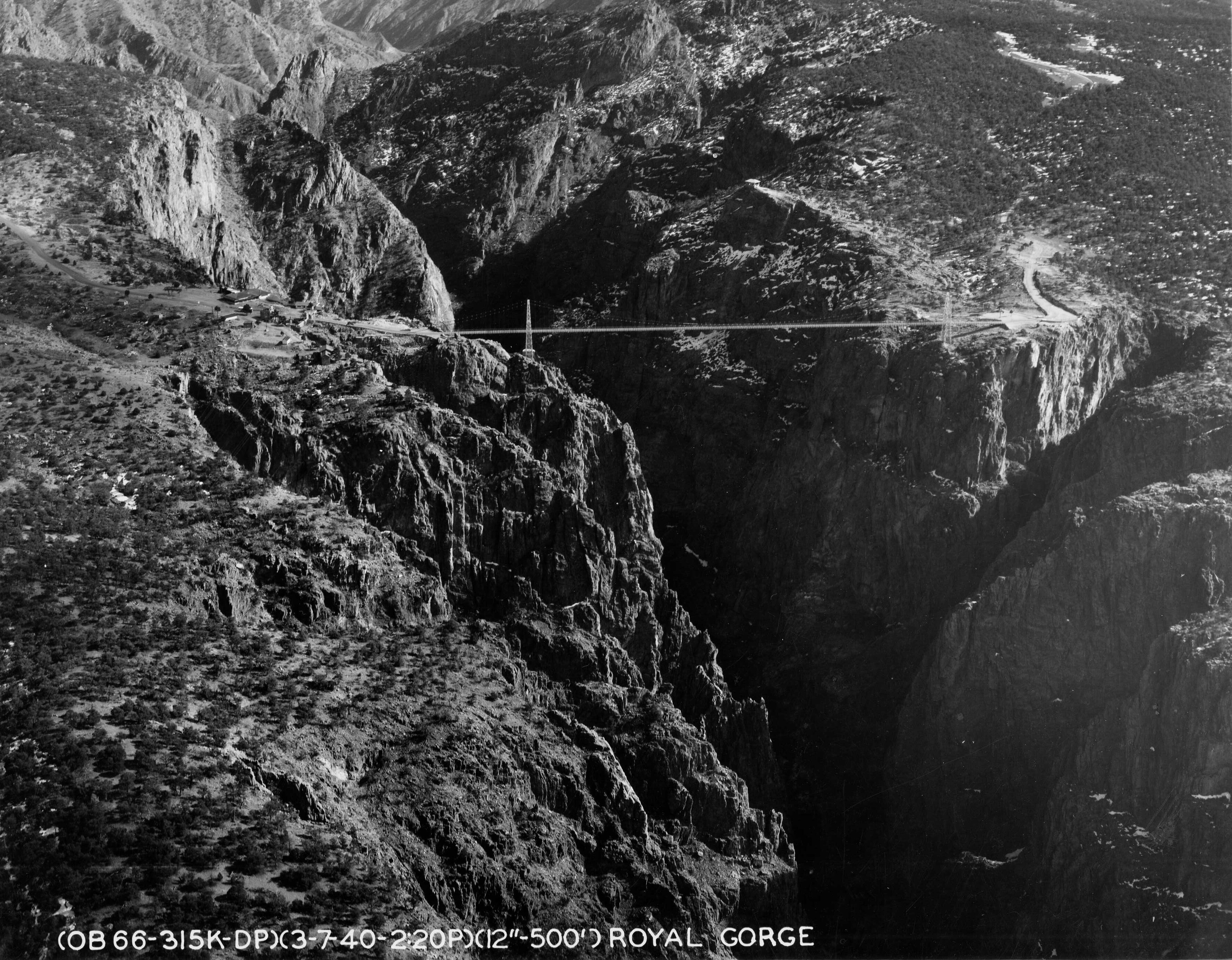
Bridge in 1940

The bridge was built between June and November 1929 at a cost of $350,000 (equivalent to $5.2 million in 2025 dollars), which was $100,000 over budget (equivalent to $1.5 million in 2025 dollars). The project was financed by Lon P. Piper, president of the Royal Gorge Bridge and Amusement Company of San Antonio, Texas. Piper hired George E. Cole as the Chief Engineer and the bridge was completed in about six months with no deaths or serious injuries. The formal opening occurred on December 8, 1929. Piper agreed to a twenty-year lease of the gorge and surrounding land, which is owned by Cañon City, paying a $1,000 yearly fee (equivalent to $14,700 in 2025 dollars) to the city, with a reduced fee of $500 (equivalent to $7,400 in 2025 dollars) in some years of hardship.

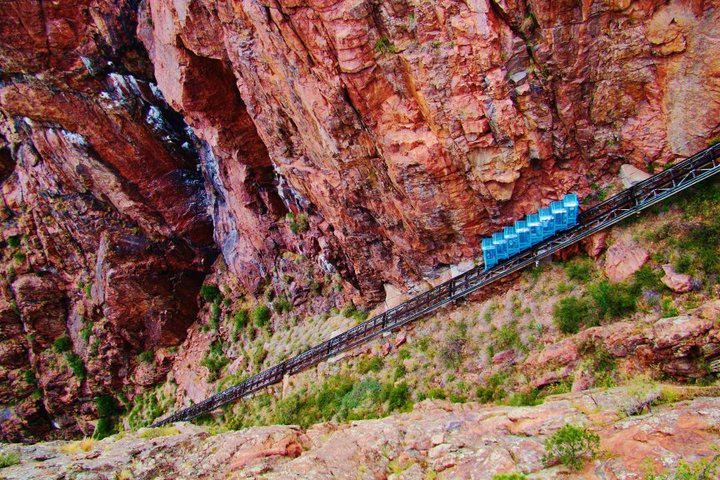
The Incline Railway, damaged and not reopened since the 2013 fire

In 1931, the 3 ft (914 mm) narrow gauge incline railway was built to the bottom of the gorge through a narrow cleft just west of the north end of the bridge. The first suicide occurred later the same year when a man, Verlyn Edward Bebb, from Pueblo, Colorado jumped off the bridge. In 1937, a lighting system was installed to illuminate the bridge and the gorge walls.

In 1947, after struggling for many years through the Great Depression and World War II, Piper sold the bridge and leasing rights to a group of local Colorado businessmen and Clint Murchison, a Texan who made a fortune in oil, gas, and real estate. A long-time employee of the park stated that Murchison, who died in 1969, never visited the bridge he had bought, even after he became the sole owner.

In the 1950s, a lodge was built by the gorge and the Silver Rock Railway 2 ft (610 mm) narrow gauge train with a Chance Rides miniature C.P. Huntington locomotive began running along the edge of the gorge near the bridge. In 1956, Murchison and his Royal Gorge Bridge Company based in Dallas agreed to pay the city a percentage of its revenue instead of the $1,000 yearly fee for the lease. The percentage arrangement has proven very favorable for the city in the ensuing years, allowing it to lower property taxes significantly. The property tax rate has since become the lowest in Colorado.

=== 1960s–1990s ===
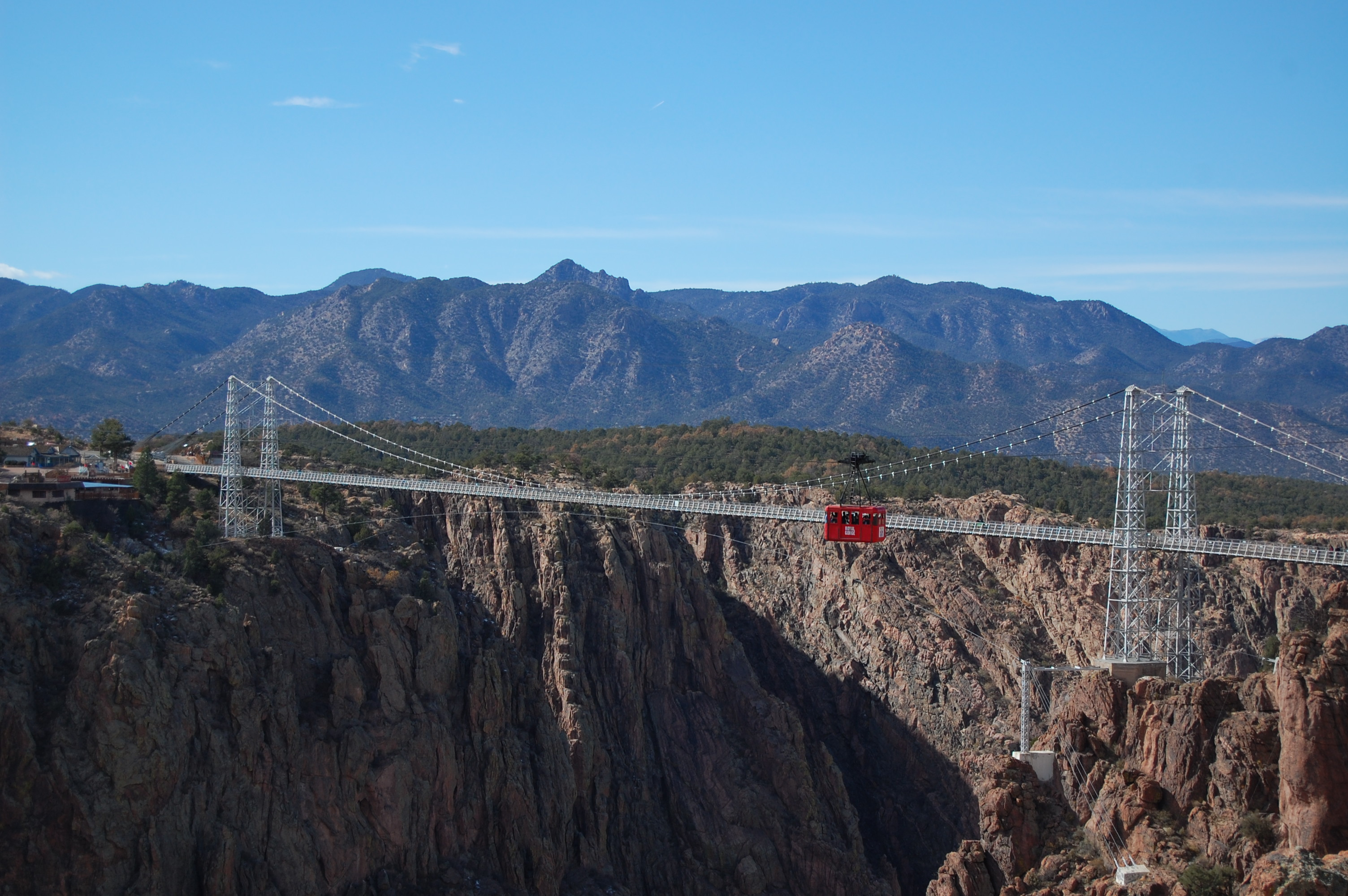
Original aerial tram, destroyed by the 2013 fire

In April 1962, Donald K. MacKenzie fell from the bridge, with his death being ruled a suicide by the Fremont County coroner.

In 1967, an open bid was held for the leasing rights with several companies expressing interest in the acquisition. The bid was won by Murchison's company, which signed another twenty-year contract with the city. The aerial tram was opened in 1969, crossing the gorge just east of the bridge. Also in 1969, following the death of Murchison, his sons, John and Clint Jr., inherited the bridge and lease.

In 1979, Lucille Murchison, the wife of John Murchison, inherited the bridge and lease after her husband's death.

The bridge and the incline railway were listed in the National Register of Historic Places on September 2, 1983. The official government registration papers indicate that the city of Cañon City had become the owner of the bridge and incline railway at some point since the 1940s, besides owning the land they leased to the Royal Gorge Bridge Company.

The bridge underwent significant renovations from 1980 to 1984. New cable anchors and suspension rods were installed and the bridge was re-painted. The cost of the renovations was over $2.8 million, more than the original purchase price when adjusted for inflation up until the 1980s.

In 1984, Leisure and Recreational Concepts, a Dallas-based company, was hired by Murchison to oversee operations at Royal Gorge Bridge and Park.

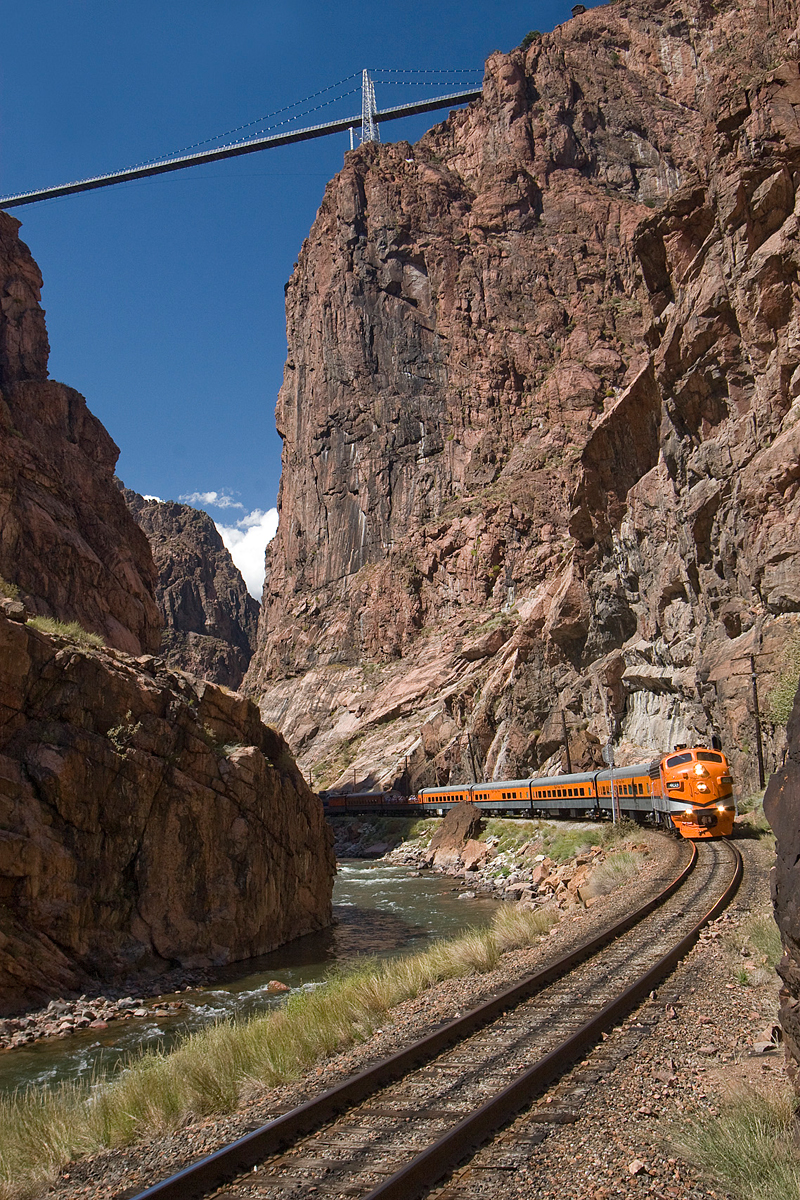
Royal Gorge Route Railroad

In July 1998, William Fehr, the owner of a gravel business based in Parkdale at the entrance to the gorge, purchased the rail lines through the gorge. The sale came after the Southern Pacific and the Union Pacific had merged in 1996 and decided to run their trains on better tracks through northern Colorado. As a part of the purchase, and unbeknownst to Fehr at the time, the sale included the "air rights" above the tracks through the gorge, including the space occupied by the Royal Gorge Bridge. An air rights fee had been negotiated with the railroad companies for $200 per year since 1929, plus another $200 per year for the space occupied by the base of the incline railway. In January 1999, Fehr placed a bid to purchase the entire concession from the city, since the operating company's lease was due to expire in 2001. When the bid was declined without consideration, Fehr decided to increase the fee for the air rights to $750,000 a year. The city began investigating legal procedures to possibly condemn the air rights. Eventually, the city and Fehr agreed on permanent easements that cost the city a one-time fee of $99,000.

=== 21st century ===
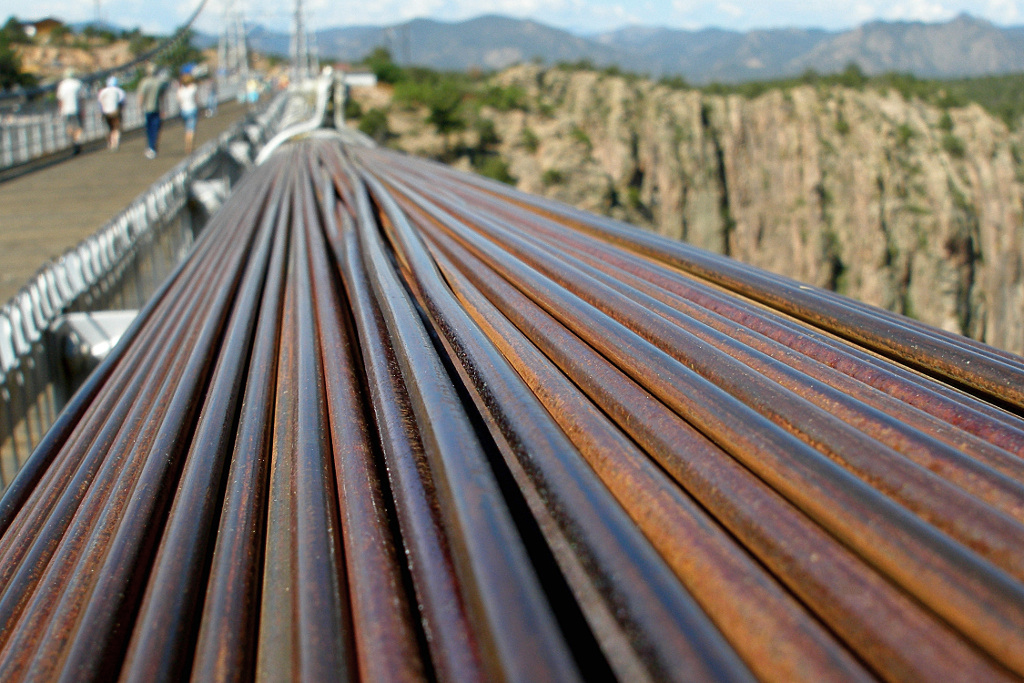
Cable strands

The Royal Rush Skycoaster was opened on the south side of the gorge in 2003 just east of the bridge.

On October 5, 2003, while performing a proximity demonstration, Australian wingsuiter Dwain Weston was killed attempting to fly over the bridge. Weston was wearing a wingsuit, a skydiving suit with fabric extended below the arms to the body and between the legs to catch air, allowing for horizontal travel when skydiving. He was to go over the bridge while fellow skydiver Jeb Corliss was to go under it. Misjudging his distance from the bridge, Weston struck a railing while traveling an estimated 120 mph, severing his leg at the hip. He fell onto a ledge in the gorge under a parachute that had opened on impact, though it is assumed he had already died.

Between March and May 2012, three people committed suicide by jumping off the bridge. The average number of suicides in the previous twelve years had been one per year according to the general manager for the Royal Gorge Bridge and Park. As a result of the larger than normal costs incurred in retrieving the bodies, Cañon City was billed by the Royal Gorge Express LLC — owners of the railroad that runs below the bridge — for $5,025 for use of specialized equipment and qualified personnel in the recoveries. The three suicides occurred on March 6, March 14, and May 8. The third incident required four trips into the gorge, with the body being found a week later by river rafters. In 2022, safety upgrades, including security fencing and raised railings, were made to deter would-be jumpers.

== 2013 wildfire ==
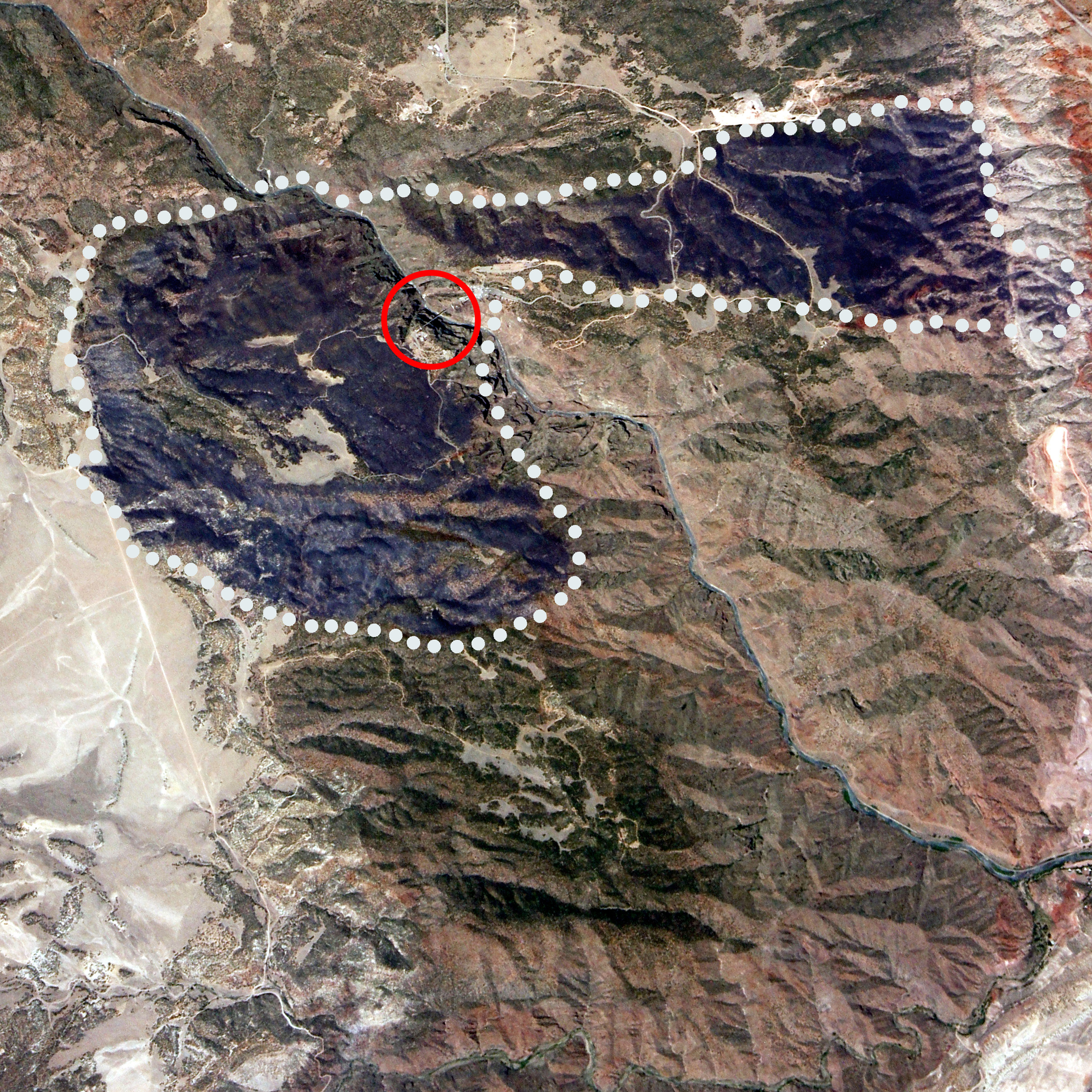
ISS image of burn scars with bridge circled in red

On June 11, 2013, most of the park structures on both sides of the gorge were devastated by a man-made wildfire. The fire jumped from the south to the north side of the gorge just west of the bridge and burned 3,218 acres (1,302 ha), of which 2,156 acres (873 ha) was park property, over the next four days until it was contained. The bridge sustained only minimal damage with approximately 100 wooden deck planks of 1292 total planks requiring replacement on the south side; however, 48 of the park's 52 buildings were destroyed. No visitors, park employees or any animals in the wildlife park were injured or killed by the fire. The Incline Railway was severely damaged and the aerial tram was destroyed. Park executives announced on June 13 that the bridge would be repaired and the park rebuilt. Rebuilding began about a week after the fire and demolition of all damaged structures took about five months. The new visitor center's groundbreaking ceremony was on January 31, 2014.

== Park reopening ==
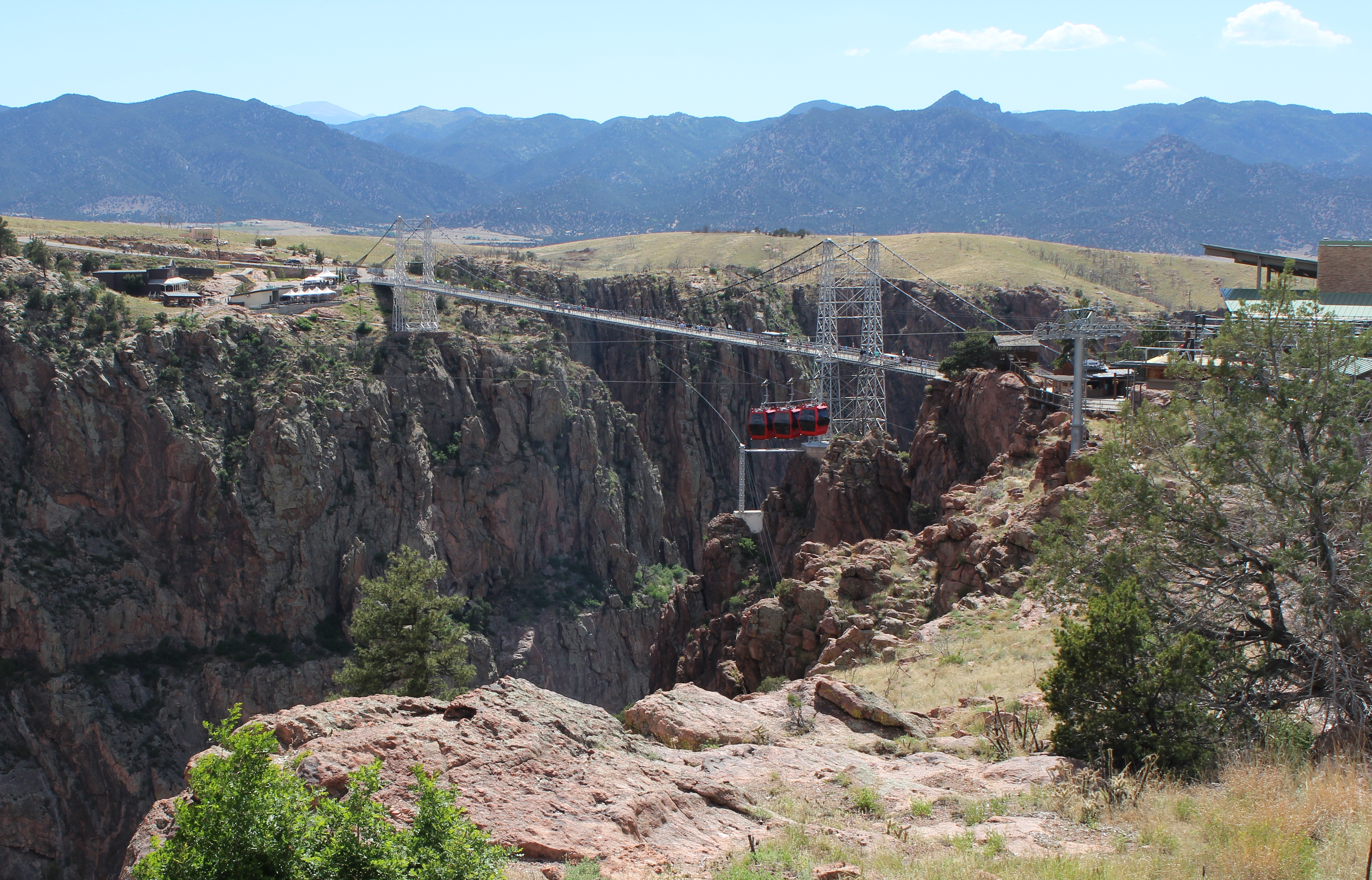
Bridge and the new gondolas

The Royal Gorge Bridge and Park reopened on August 30, 2014. A grand reopening ceremony took place on May 8, 2015, after the completion of $30 million in repairs. The rebuilding plan did not include the wildlife park and those animals were relocated. The bridge entry is open daily from 7 am until dusk with the visitor center, rides and attractions opening at 10 am, weather permitting. Attractions that have been refurbished or rebuilt since the fire include a visitor center with an observation deck, a water clock, gondolas to replace the aerial trams, Plaza Theater and Historical Expo, Children's Playland, and the original Royal Rush Skycoaster. The Cloudscraper Zip Line — the highest in North America — opened on March 28, 2015. The damaged Incline Railway and the Silver Rock Railway are not listed among current rides and attractions.

In January 2016, the Royal Gorge Company of Colorado paid the city a record high $2.1 million lease payment. Attendance in 2015 was the highest in the park's history at nearly 350,000 visitors. The attendance figure represented an increase of 20% from the attendance of about 292,000 in 2012, the last full year of operations before the 2013 fire. For the 2013 season the city was paid $1.68 million by the park's operating company, mostly from business continuation insurance. Park officials estimated after the fire that more than 26 million people had visited the park since it opened in 1929.

On November 1, 2026, a new management company, CMBH Partners took over a long-term lease with Canon City, which owns the bridge and the surrounding land.

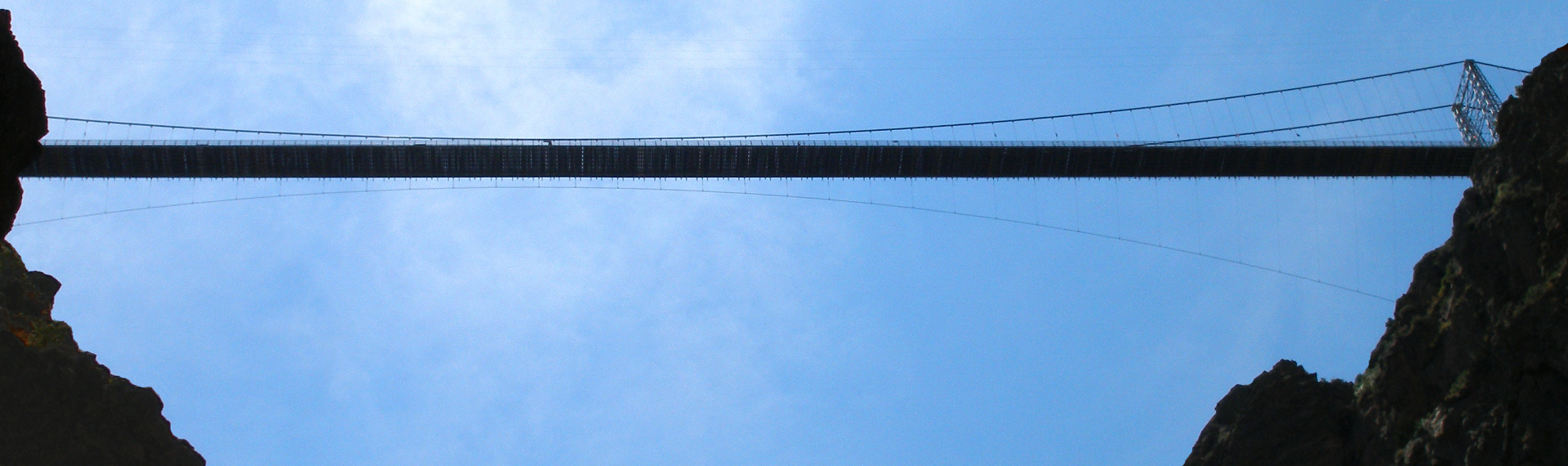
Wide view from the river

== Highest bridges ==
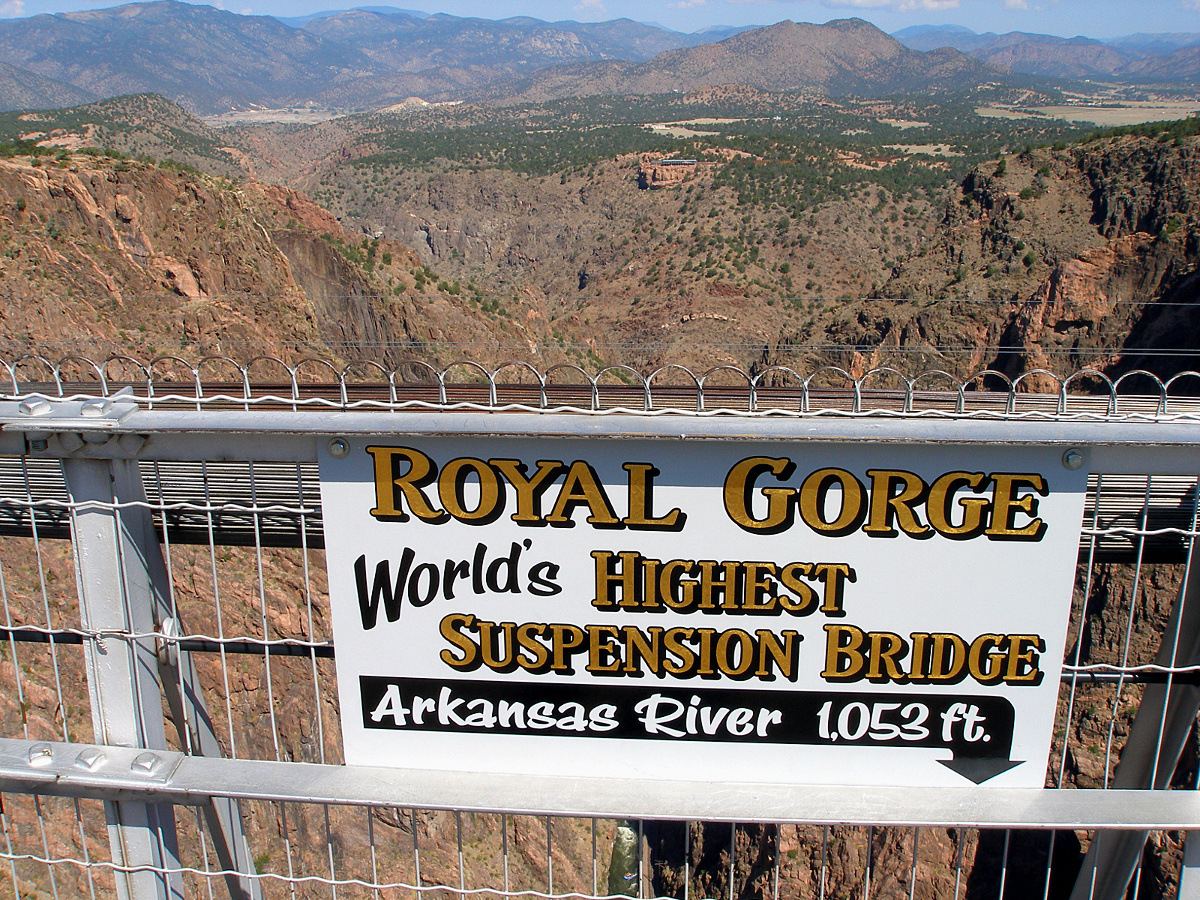
Sign on bridge with inaccurate height in 2008

The Royal Gorge Bridge surpassed the Sidi M'Cid Bridge in Algeria in 1929 to become the highest bridge in the world with a deck height of 955 ft (291 m), measured from the deck to the river surface below. (Note: Bridge height information currently relies on the only known reference — HighestBridges.com — for comparing bridge deck height measurements. No additional independent sources are known to exist for deck height measurements of all high bridges worldwide.) The Liuguanghe Bridge in China surpassed the Royal Gorge Bridge in 2001 to become the new highest bridge with a deck height of 974 ft (297 m). The Royal Gorge Bridge surrendered the title of the world's highest suspension bridge when the Beipan River Guanxing Highway Bridge in China was completed in 2003 with a deck height of 1,200 ft (366 m). Several more even higher bridges, mostly in China, have been completed since 2003 causing the Royal Gorge Bridge to drop out of the top ten highest bridges in the world. As of 2025, the Royal Gorge Bridge is among the 50 highest bridges in the world, and remains the highest bridge in the United States. Several additional bridges more than 955 ft (291 m) high are scheduled for completion through 2025, many of them in China.

Since September 2025, the highest bridge is China's Huajiang Canyon Bridge, which has a suspended span deck height of 2,051 ft (625 metres).

== See also ==
- Bibliography of Colorado
- Geography of Colorado
- History of Colorado
- Index of Colorado-related articles
- List of Colorado-related lists
- Outline of Colorado
- National Register of Historic Places listings in Fremont County, Colorado
- List of bridges in the United States by height
