= Sean Leary (climber) =

American rock climber (1975–2014)

Personal information
- Born: August 23, 1975 San Joaquin County, California, U.S.
- Died: March 13, 2014 (aged 38) Zion National Park, Utah, U.S.
- Occupations: Rigger, stuntman

Climbing career
- Type of climber: Big-wall climbing; Speed climbing
- Known for: Speed record on Salathé Wall, El Capitan (2009); Speed record on The Nose, El Capitan (2010)

Sean "Stanley" Leary (August 23, 1975 – March 13, 2014) was an American rock climber and BASE jumper. Leary was considered one of the strongest Yosemite climbers of his generation, setting multiple speed records on El Capitan. He also completed first ascents in Antarctica, Baffin Island, and Patagonia. Leary died during a BASE jump in Zion National Park in 2014. Filmmaker Nick Rosen called him a "great unsung hero" of American climbing.

== Early life ==
Leary was born on August 23, 1975, in San Joaquin County, California, and grew up in Pine Grove. He frequently traveled to El Portal, where his family had a home, and began climbing nearby at Yosemite National Park.

Leary attended Humboldt State University, where he worked as a mountain guide. During this time, he gained his nickname "Stanley", after forgetting a climbing hammer during an expedition and instead bringing a Stanley brand claw hammer.

== Climbing career ==
In July 2010, Leary and Alex Honnold completed a link up of three different El Capitan routes in 24 hours: The Nose, Salathé Wall and Lurking Fear. In total, the pair climbed 85 pitches and roughly 7,900 feet (2,400 m) of elevation. Later that year, Leary and Dean Potter set the speed record on The Nose, finishing the 2,900 feet (880 m) foot climb in two hours, 36 minutes, and 45 seconds. The Nose is one of the most famous climbs in the world, with the speed record closely contested over the previous 20 years. Leary and Potter beat the previous record of Hans Florine and Yuji Hirayama by just 20 seconds. Leary also holds the speed record for the Salathé Wall (set in 2009 with Alex Honnold) and the mixed-gender speed record for the Nose (set in 2012 with Mayan Smith-Gobat).

Together with an international team of climbers led by Leo Houlding, Leary made the first ascent of route on the northeast ridge of the Ulvetanna Peak in Antarctica, only the fourth established route on the peak. It required 5,700 feet (1,700 m) feet of climbing over 35 pitches, with individual pitches up to grade E6 6b (5.12) A2.

== Death ==
On March 13, 2014, Leary performed a solo BASE jump of the West Temple formation in Zion National Park. He was scheduled to work on a climbing film in the park the following day. He was reported missing on March 23, and his body was found by search and rescue hours later. Leary's friend and fellow BASE jumper Dean Potter speculated that he collided with a rock formation while flying at high speed in a wing suit.

== Personal life ==
Leary dated Brazilian climber Roberta Nunes, who died in a 2006 car crash. Per her request, Leary scattered her ashes during a BASE jump in Patagonia.

In 2010, Leary married Annamieka, an ophthalmologist, in a meadow below El Capitan. She was pregnant with their first child at the time of his death.

Leary worked as a stuntman and rigger for climbing films.
