= Taft Point =

Scenic viewpoint in Yosemite National Park, California, US

Coordinates: 37°42′47″N 119°36′17″W

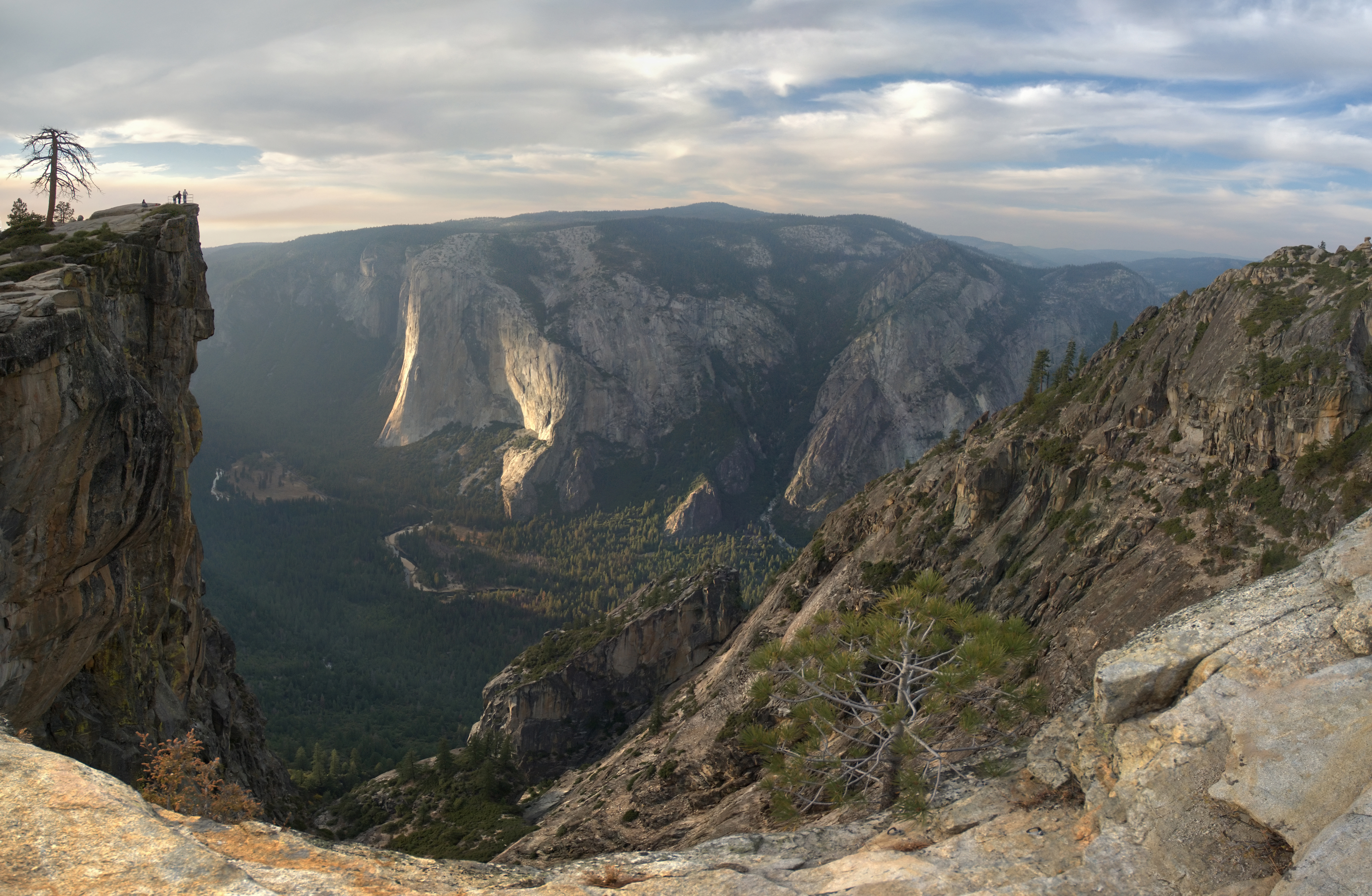
Profile Rock or Taft Point, a promontory on the south side of Yosemite Valley, is on the left.

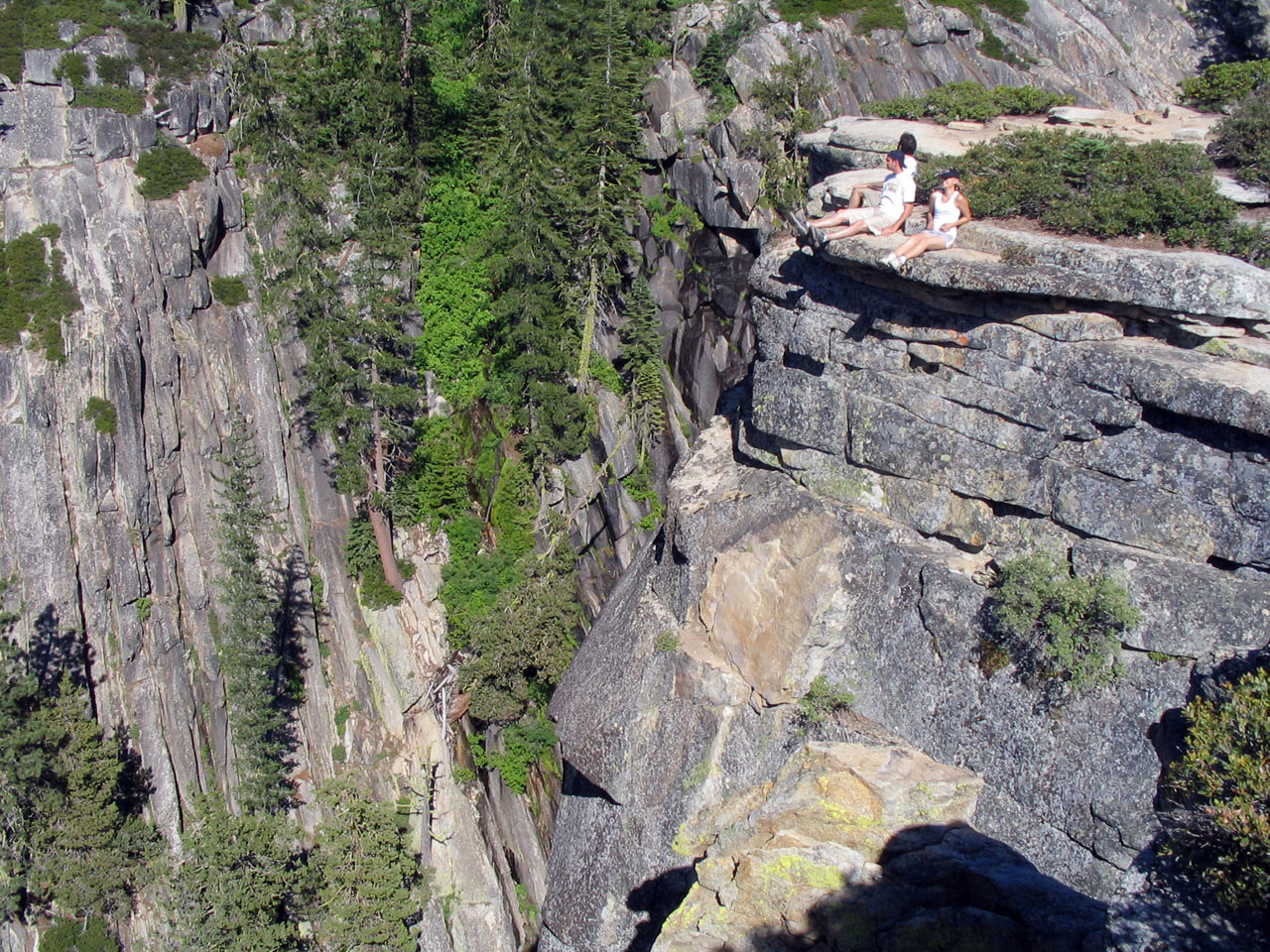
The first fissure at Taft Point. The drop is 1,000 feet (300 m) from the edge at this point.

Taft Point is a viewpoint in Yosemite National Park west of Glacier Point. It offers wide views of Yosemite Valley, Yosemite Falls and El Capitan. The main attraction of Taft Point is the giant fissures in the mile-high granite rock. The fissures are breaks and cracks in the mountain that drop directly down to the valley floor at some points.

The point is named after 27th president of the United States William Howard Taft, who, according to newspaper accounts, came across the point when he visited Yosemite for three days hosted by John Muir in October 1909. The two hiked from nearby Glacier Point down to the valley floor. President Taft planned the trip by horseback, but the horses brought for his use were all too small for his 300 plus pounds. His staff set luncheon for the president's party during the hike, including fried chicken. The lunch spot may have been near the flat ledge that has since become known as Taft Point.

Taft wrote of his hike, "While I am tired from the open air exercise, I feel greatly the better for it." He was sweat-drenched when he returned to the Sentinel Hotel in El Portal following the hike.

== Hiking trail ==
The Taft Point trailhead is located about five minutes before the end of Glacier Point Road. The trail itself is a one-mile (1.6 km) hike from the trailhead. The second half is downhill. Taft Point is fairly remote and unpopulated. The trail begins somewhat unguarded from the sun, but transitions into a shaded flat walkway through a green meadow. The final approach of the hike is slightly downhill on a rocky surface. The trip from the trailhead takes 20-30 minutes.

== Destinations nearby ==
- Sentinel Dome
- Glacier Point
- Ostrander Lake, Trailhead
- Bridalveil Creek, Campground
- Yosemite Valley

== Notable incidents ==
On May 16, 2015 Dean Potter and Graham Hunt died while BASE jumping from Taft Point. They were attempting a proximity wingsuit flight through a notch in a neighboring cliff known as "Lost Brother". Hunt struck a wall on the far side of the notch, while Potter cleared the notch and struck rocks immediately beyond. Both were killed on impact.
