= Eli Thompson (skydiver) =

American skydiver (1973–2009)

Eli Thompson (July 11, 1973 – August 28, 2009) was an American skydiver and BASE jumper.

Thompson performed over 13,000 skydives. He was part of the 1996–2000 world champion skydiving team the Flyboyz. Thompson hosted 30 episodes of Stunt Junkies on the Discovery Channel between 2006 and 2007, and worked as an aerial stuntman in Austin Powers in Goldmember. From 2001 until his death, he was a professional Red Bull athlete.

Thompson died on August 28, 2009, while performing a wingsuit proximity-flying jump from a helicopter in the Swiss Alps, when he hit the side of the mountain.

Thompson was married to Sarah Farooqui. He had two children; in September 2009, his wife was pregnant with his first boy.
