= Surenen Pass =

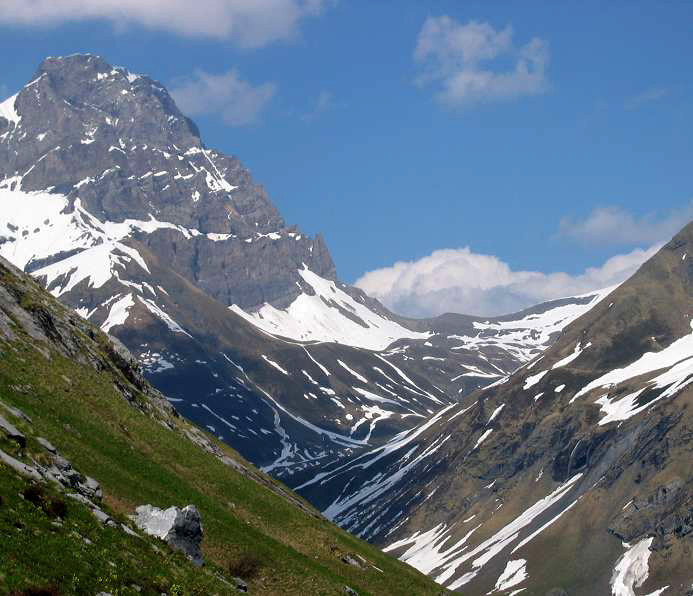
- The Blackenstock (left, 2930m, in front of Brunnistock, hidden) and the Surenen Pass (center), viewed from the west

- Location within Switzerland
- Elevation: 2,292 metres (7,520 ft)
- Traversed by: Trail

Third Approach
- Location: Uri, Switzerland
- Range: Alps
- Coordinates: 46°50′11″N 8°32′45″E
- Topo map: swisstopo

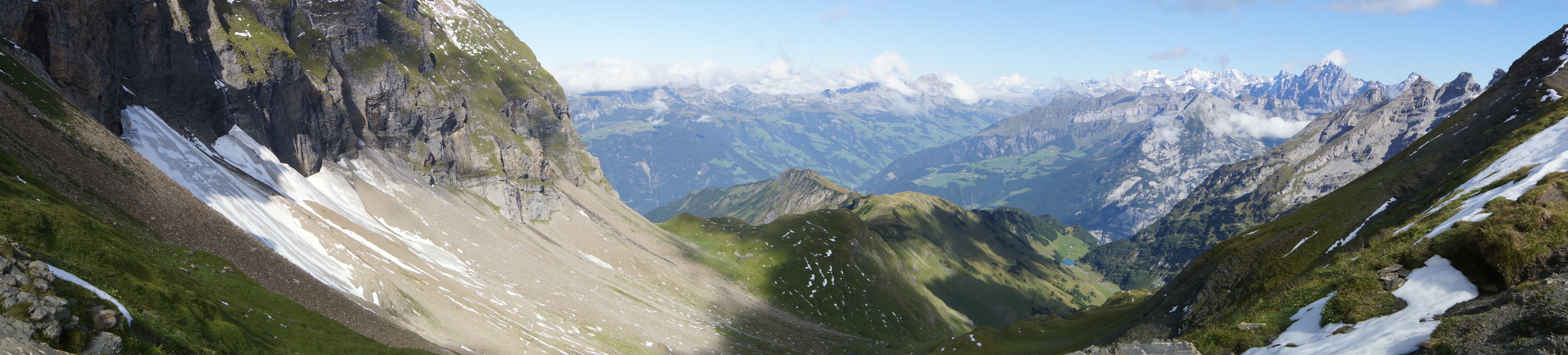
View from the pass looking towards the east

The Surenen Pass (German: Surenenpass) is a high mountain pass across the Urner Alps in the canton of Uri in Central Switzerland. The pass crosses the col between the Blackenstock (2915 m) and the Eggenmanndli (2448 m) peaks, at an elevation of 2,292 m (7,520 ft).

The pass is traversed by a trail, which connects the village of Altdorf, in the canton of Uri (460 m (1,510 ft)), with the village of Engelberg, in the canton of Obwalden (1,000 m (3,300 ft)). The trail forms part of the Alpine Pass Route, a long-distance hiking trail across Switzerland between Sargans to the east and Montreux to the west of Switzerland.

== See also ==
- List of mountain passes in Switzerland
