= The Stonemasters =

Group of rock climbers and adventurers in the 1970s

The Stonemasters were a group of rock climbers and adventurers in the 1970s, roughly 1973 to 1980, who originally climbed in Southern California—principally Tahquitz, Suicide Rock, Joshua Tree—and later, Yosemite National Park further north. The initial group were those of the first ten ascents of Valhalla on Suicide Rock.

== Members ==
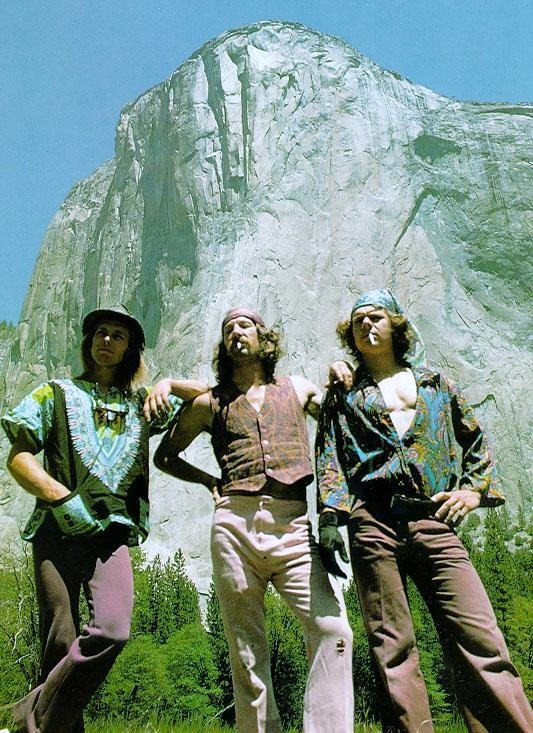
Billy Westbay, Jim Bridwell, and John Long after the first one-day ascent of the Nose in 1975

The Stonemasters included some of the following members: Rick Accomazzo, Dale Bard, Jim Bridwell, Dean Fidelman, Richard Harrison, Mike Graham, Robs Muir, Gib Lewis, Bill Antel, Jim Hoagland, Tobin Sorenson, John Bachar, Lynn Hill, Ron Kauk and John Long. The group was loosely organized. Its senior member and leader was Jim Bridwell.

== History ==
They were one of the groups at the forefront of Yosemite Valley climbing throughout the 1970s. Many of them lived seasonally as dirtbag climbers (individuals living out of their cars and tents in order to climb as much as possible) in Camp 4 so they could climb as much as possible.

Among the Stonemasters' most notable accomplishments was the first ascent of El Capitan in a day by members Jim Bridwell, Billy Westbay, and John Long. Additionally, in 1975, members John Bachar, John Long, and Ron Kauk made the first free ascent of Astroman – a difficult and groundbreaking event at the time. They often came into conflict with the National Park Service because of their disregard for family campers and rules. However, some of their members also assisted the National Park Service in the rescues of other climbers on walls like El Capitan and Half Dome.

The Stonemasters also feature prominently in Yosemite Valley climbing lore because, in 1977, when a plane carrying 6000 pounds of marijuana crashed 16 miles from Yosemite Valley, Jim Bridwell and other Stonemasters recovered much of the marijuana.

Other recreational drug use also featured prominently among their activities. For instance, they often espoused the three-day plan: prepare to go climb, go climbing while on LSD, and then recuperate. Bridwell in particular was known for taking LSD while climbing.

== See also ==
- Long, John; Fidelman, Dean (2009). The Stone Masters: California Rock Climbers in the Seventies. T.Adler Books. ISBN 9780984094905.
- Peter Mortimer, Nick Rosen, Josh Lowell (Directors) (2014). Valley Uprising. IMDb. Event occurs at 34 minutes 4 seconds.
