= Stoney Point (California) =

Stoney Point Outcroppings
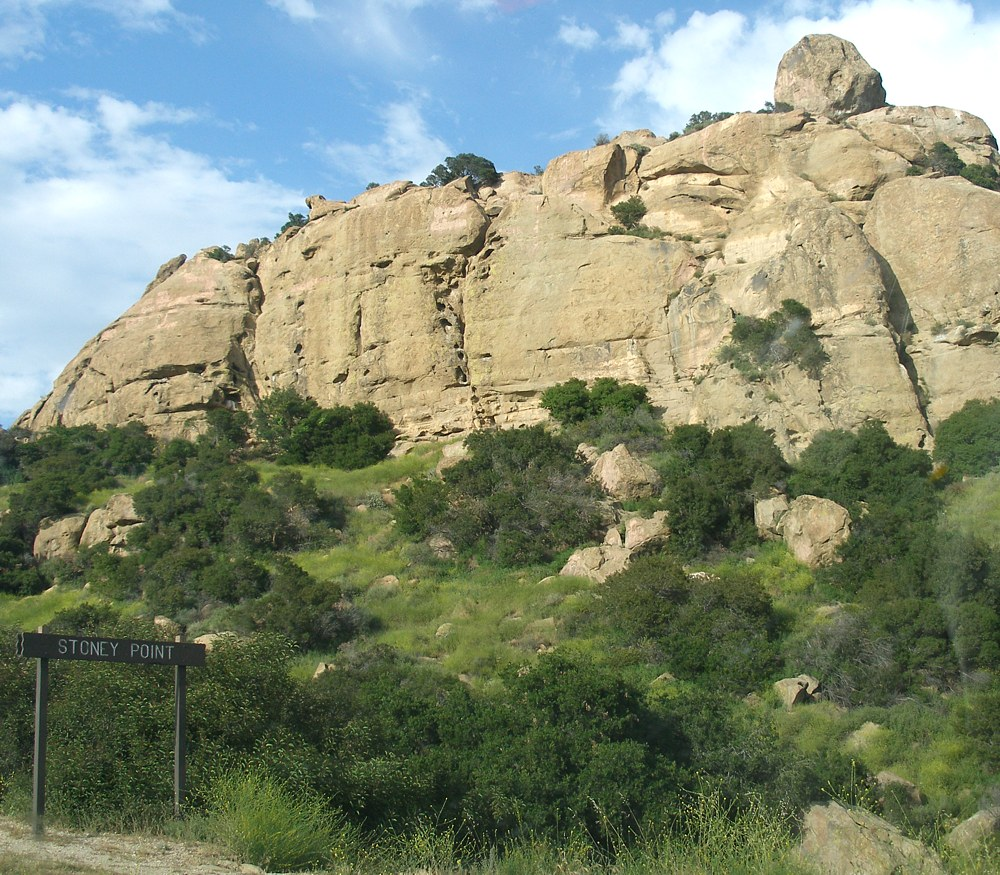
- Stoney Point

- Location within the Los Angeles metropolitan area
- 34.270929°N 118.603522°W
- Location: Chatsworth Park North, Chatsworth, Los Angeles, California

Site notes
- Area: Santa Susana Mountains
- Architect: None
- Architectural style: None
- Governing body: City of Los Angeles Department of Recreation and Parks

Los Angeles Historic-Cultural Monument
- Designated: November 20, 1974
- Reference no.: 132

Stoney Point, also known as the Stoney Point Outcroppings or Chatsworth Formation, is a Los Angeles City park near the north end of Topanga Canyon Boulevard (State Route 27) in Chatsworth, Los Angeles, California, part of the city of Los Angeles. Stoney Point is a popular destination for hikers, equestrians and also with rock climbers because of its large boulders, which afford many opportunities to practice the sport of bouldering. The top of the rock formation offers excellent views of Chatsworth, the Santa Susana Mountains, Coyote Pass, and the entire San Fernando Valley.

Wildlife including coyotes, rattlesnakes, red-tailed hawks, golden eagles, turkey vultures, rabbits, and skunks can all be found at Stoney Point. When visiting the park, dogs should be kept on a leash for their own safety and a watchful eye should be kept for africanized "killer" bees.

== Geology ==
Geologists know Stoney Point as the Chatsworth Formation, which are the giant rock outcroppings in Simi Hills. They are Upper Cretaceous outcroppings, which means they are more than 65 million years old. They originated in the middle of the Pacific Ocean, possibly on the continental shelf near Central America, or even near Baja California. They were formed by turbidity currents, giant “gravity slides” that deposited sand in the ocean at the depth of 4,000 to 5,000 feet. These turbidity currents were often “tens of miles in length and a half a mile or more in width” which explains the size of the mountains around the Chatsworth Formation, and makes them turbidites. In between this activity, in quiet times, silt from the ocean would settle on the formation, and because silt erodes more quickly, the different turbidity currents that formed the rock are visible.

The Chatsworth formation is part of the Pacific Plate, which grinds against the North American Plate, and therefore is continuously pushed northwest at a rate of 2.5 inches per year. The Chatsworth Formation was pushed out of the ocean, and, as part of Simi Hills, created part of the Transverse Ranges. Because any fossils left in the ocean were ground up on the journey up, there are very few fossils to be found in the area.

The sandstone is a medium-grained variety, and was originally light gray; however, the mica and clay in the rock oxidizes and turns a tan color. Not all of Chatsworth Formation has oxidized yet, and some is still light gray.

== History ==
Stoney Point was the site of a Tongva Native American rancheria until the arrival of the Spanish during the late 18th century. It is believed that the village of Momonga was located at Stoney Point.

It was used as a marker by the Southern Pacific Railroad during construction of the railroad through the Santa Susana Mountains.

The formation is believed to have been used as a hideout by the outlaw Tiburcio Vasquez in the 1870s.

== Historic site ==
It was designated a historical Los Angeles Historic and Cultural Monument in 1974, because of its historic and cultural value as well as being deemed one of the "most picturesque places in Los Angeles." The facility features 81 acres of land, including a five-acre equestrian center which was purchased by the City in 2007 and is home to the Annual Chatsworth Day of the Horse Festival hosted by the Chatsworth Neighborhood Council each Spring.

During the land grab that resulted from the McKinley Act, Stoney Point was claimed by the Charlton Family of New York. Stoney Point was the site of the Charlton Quarry, one of three Chatsworth Quarries that was operated by the Bannon Mining Company. "Dimension Stone" was quarried for the nearby train tunnel. Remnants of the quarry can still be found on the eastern side of Stoney Point along the Santa Susana Creek.

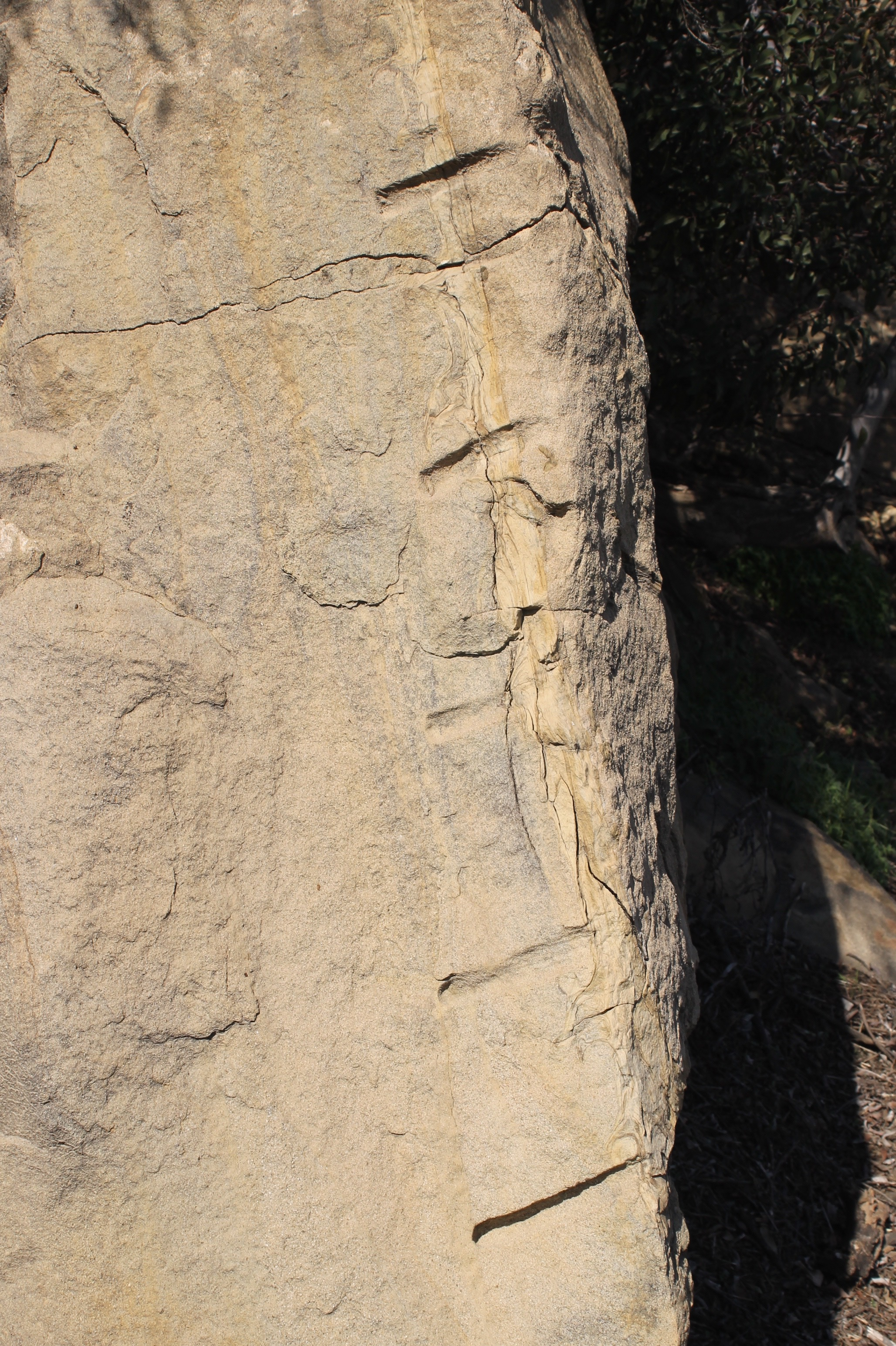
Remnants from the Charlton Quarry

== Railroad history ==
Stoney Point functions as mile marker on the Southern Pacific Railroad, which links much of Southern California to Northern California. Stoney Point is located at the base of the Simi/Santa Susana Grade. Stone that was quarried at Stoney Point was used in Chatsworth's train tunnels.

When inhabited by the Gabrielino-Tongva tribe and the missionaries in the early years, the land was prime for agriculture including fruit, vegetables, wheat, and barley. However, once the railroad was in place, the heavy iron from the tracks and constant land disruption altered the availability of wilderness. Forests and vegetation had to be eliminated in order to lay the track and Native Americans had to be relocated from their homelands. Natives were forced to lose all that they had worked on when they had to leave their fertile soil and efficient irrigation. After the turn of the Century, dry farming resumed and most of the land surrounding Stoney Point was planted with citrus and olives. Today, it is surrounded by horse boarding stables and equestrian homes.

Because of a blind curve caused by Stoney Points rock formations, train operators would sound the whistle as they approached the bend. Residents complained and today's engineers sound the whistle either from the Chatsworth train depot or as they exit the tunnel at the top of the grade. The easement that connects Rinaldi Street to Andora Avenue by crossing the railroad tracks was once the "Old Mission Trail" and was the primary route to the San Fernando Mission from Chatsworth and later became known as North Andora Avenue. Later, the street name was changed to Rinaldi, but an equestrian easement remains. In 1998, Councilmember Hal Bernson included the easement in his "Guide to Equestrian Trails" and stood behind the community by keeping the easement open when the MTA tried to restrict access.

In 2001, the Metropolitan Transportation Authority cut down the ancient Eucalyptus trees that lined the railroad tracks in Stoney Point out of concern for the safety of park visitors should one of the trees fall on the tracks.

On September 12, 2008, at 16:22PST, a Metrolink Commuter Train collided with a cargo train resulting in 25 fatalities in what was declared the worst train wreck in U.S. History in over 40 years. The crash site is on the Northeast side of the park and is accessible through the park. In September 2009, then-Councilmember Mitchell Englander hosted a memorial at Stoney Point and a marker was placed in memory of the victims. Civilian first responders from the local community and passengers who survived the crash were in attendance.

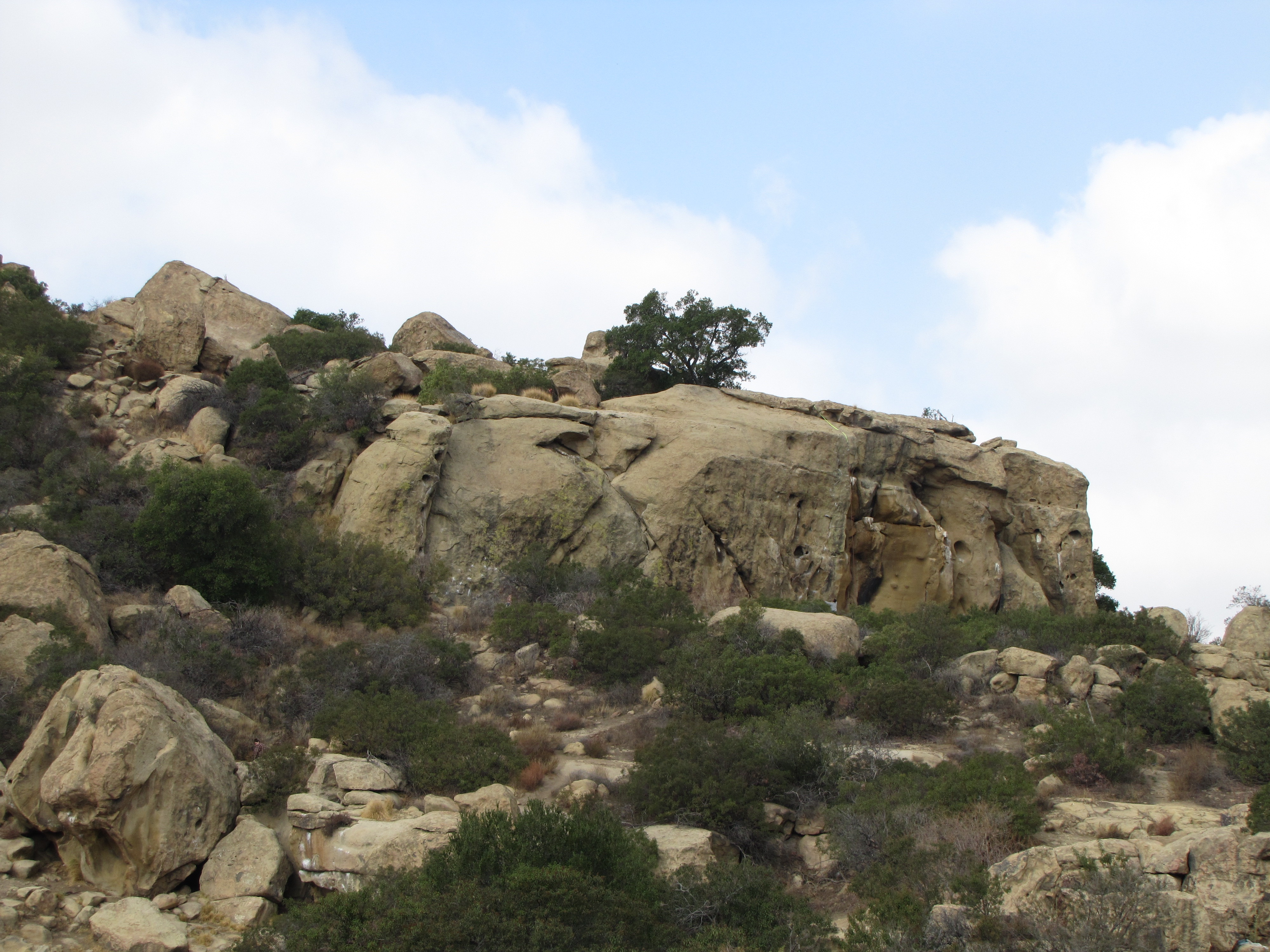
Ancient petroglyph on east side of Stoney Point

== Gabrielino-Tongva Natives occupy the land ==
Stoney Point was occupied by Gabrielino-Tongva (Gabrielino) Natives beginning in 6000 BC. The Gabrielino homeland offers an area rich in natural resources as well as an effective system of trade. This tribe was widely known as skilled hunter-gatherers. Faunal and floral resources were abundant and offered a wide variety based on location and season. Food sources were available year-round, including rabbits, roots/bulbs, and shellfish. Some crops sprung up only once a year, such as acorns, and were collected in large numbers. Winter was the only time of the year that brought up food stresses in inland communities due to lack of fresh vegetation. The communities closer to the coast, however, fared just fine with the marine food resources.

The diversity of resources for the Gabrielino Natives was mainly due to the wide range of biotic zones in their territory. These included beach and coastal regions, fresh and salt water regions, chaparral and grassland zones, and even woodland and mountain regions. Faunal resources included land mammals, fish, insects, reptiles, and sea-mammals. Floral resources included trees, plants, seeds, bulbs, and sea grasses. Mineral resources included obsidian, chert, and other types of stones to make tools and caulking or adhesive compounds. These three resource categories satisfied all the material needs of the Gabrielino Natives.

The Gabrielinos developed sustainable diets by using the resources available to them at different times of the year. They were excellent hunters that effectively used their weapons and technology to develop strategies to utilize available resources. Meat hunting was prominent during the winter when fresh plant food wasn't available. Fishing and sea-mammal hunting took place in the spring and summer seasons and was avoided during the fall and winter when the fish retreated to the south. At a ritual called the Mourning Ceremony, food and manufactured items were destroyed to restrict the amount of goods available. This Ceremony took place in hopes to maintain the demand for the services as well as skills of the craftsmen of the village.

Gabrielino Natives believed that greediness and food hoarding were reprehensible traits and thus the proper management of food resources was evident in their culture. Fishermen and hunters were prohibited from consuming their own kill in order to discourage hoarding. At certain times of the year, large populations of people would get together to collect seasonal crops or collaborate in large-scale hunts. It was important to the Gabrielino Natives that the entire village population participated in harvesting seeds in the plain.

The Gabrielinos made sure to minimize their ecological footprint as much as possible to follow their beliefs. These Natives were very interested in the spiritual world, and members of the communities called shamans would interpret the environment. They believed that the universe was always in a state of flux, which explains their desire to maintain the preservation of the environment and the resources it provides them with. They turned to these shamans to continue the proper alignment of forces in the universe as well as tap into heavenly bodies to perform sacred rituals. The only main way they left a significant impact on the land was through rock art, which was harmless to the environment. They used two different techniques: petroglyphs (rock carving) and pictographs (rock paintings). Pictured here is a petroglyph of a rabbit or squirrel, it can be found to the left of the "X" that is carved into the face of the rock that is at the center of the photo. Most art was created during ceremonies as elaborate rituals. Following generations have preserved the remaining artwork in museums around the region, but some ancient rock art sites of the Gabrielino Natives can still be visited in the area throughout Stoney Point.

Water catch basins and mortars used for grinding nuts and seeds can still be found on the uppermost boulders at Stoney Point.

It wasn't until the creation of the California Missions, built by the Spaniards beginning in 1769, stripped the Natives of their land and turned it into an urban dwellers’ area. The creek bed on the West side of Stoney Point was the western boundary of the San Fernando Mission. By 1834, Ranchos of California were also being created on Native land. It was actually the construction of railroads and other forms of industrialization by settlers other than the Natives that created the greatest amount of harmful change to the land around Stoney Point.

== Movies and television ==
Stoney Point has been the backdrop in many movies and television shows since the silent film era. Dollhouse, Seinfeld, and CSI: Las Vegas have all used Stoney Point as a location.

== Rock climbing ==
Climbing development began at Stoney Point in the 1930s when it was discovered by young climbers then active in the Sierra Club. In the '50s and '60s pioneering rock-climbers Royal Robbins and Yvon Chouinard learned to climb at Stoney Point. Other famous climbers such as Bob Kamps, Ron Kauk, John Long, John Bachar also started to climb at Stoney Point.

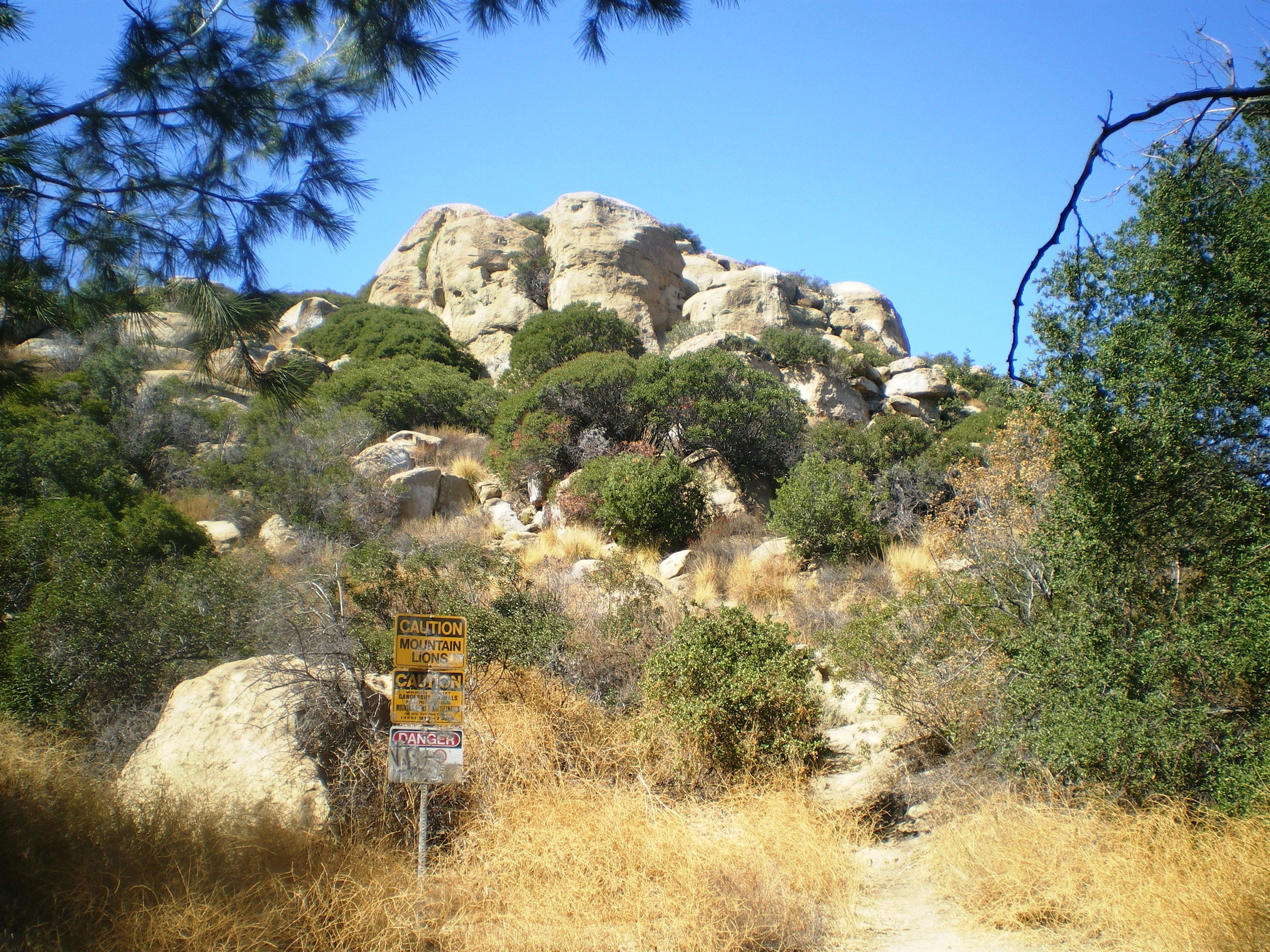

From 1959 to 1995 one of Americas most accomplished climbers Bob Kamps was a regular, as was free-solo climber Michael Reardon.

The rock is sandstone, which makes it less painful on the hands while bouldering, allowing climbers to boulder for long periods of time without worrying about the pain. But after it has rained, and soaked the rock, parts of the rocks are prone to break away. Because of this, it is recommended to wait for a minimum of 48 hours after a light rain and between 5-7 full days after a heavy rain before returning to climbing Otherwise, the climbing season at Stoney Point lasts all year. Some people have taken advantage of the easiness of the rock to chip, and have created their own chips by breaking off pieces. Climbers look down upon this practice.

There is a great variety of bouldering routes to choose from, ranging from easy to hard, based on the Yosemite Decimal System for rock climbing, and the Hueco scale for bouldering. Beginners and advanced climbers will find something for them from among more than 150 routes.

== See also ==
- Tongva settlements
- History of the San Fernando Valley to 1915
- List of Los Angeles Historic-Cultural Monuments in the San Fernando Valley
- Browns Creek Bike Path
