= Gingery =

Gingery is a surname. Notable people with the surname include:

- David J. Gingery (1932–2004), American machinist
- Don Hilary Gingery (1884–1961), American politician from Pennsylvania
- Keith Gingery (born 1969), American politician from Wyoming
- Mari Gingery (fl. 1977–1993), American climber
- Steven Gingery (born 1997), American baseball player
