= Tobin Sorenson =

American rock climber (1955–1980)

Tobin Lee Sorenson
- Born: June 15, 1955; Los Angeles, California, U.S.
- Died: October 5, 1980 (aged 25); Mount Alberta, Canadian Rockies, Canada
- Education: Biola University (B.A., 1980)
- Occupation: Rock climber · Alpinist
- Years active: c. 1972–1980
- Organizations: Stonemasters climbing community; Biola University; American Alpine Club
- Known for: Bold first ascents in Yosemite, the Alps, Canadian Rockies and New Zealand; leading figure of the 1970s Stonemasters

Tobin Sorenson (June 15, 1955 – October 5, 1980) was an American rock climber and alpinist famed for establishing bold first ascents on Yosemite big walls, in the Alps, Canadian Rockies, and New Zealand.

== Early life and education ==
A California native, Sorenson was the son of a minister, Lee Sorenson, and was raised in Covina, California. As a teenager he played the guitar at church and sang in the choir, and continued to emphasize faith and spirituality throughout his life. Sorenson graduated from Biola University in 1980.

== Career ==
Sorenson honed his climbing skills at Tahquitz Rock, Joshua Tree National Park, Suicide Rock, and Yosemite Valley. Later he turned his attention to the European Alps, and conquered several dangerous ice climbs in the Mont Blanc massif, the north face of the Grandes Jorasses, and the Eiger north face. Sorenson is considered by some to be the best all-around climber of his time. A contemporary of John Long and John Bachar in a group they called the Stonemasters putting up daring new routes in the Idyllwild, California area, Sorenson pushed risk standards in the realm of rock climbing and alpine mountaineering.

== Death ==
Sorenson died from a fall during a solo attempt of the Mount Alberta's North Face on October 5, 1980.
