= Columbia Boulder =

Granite boulder, Yosemite

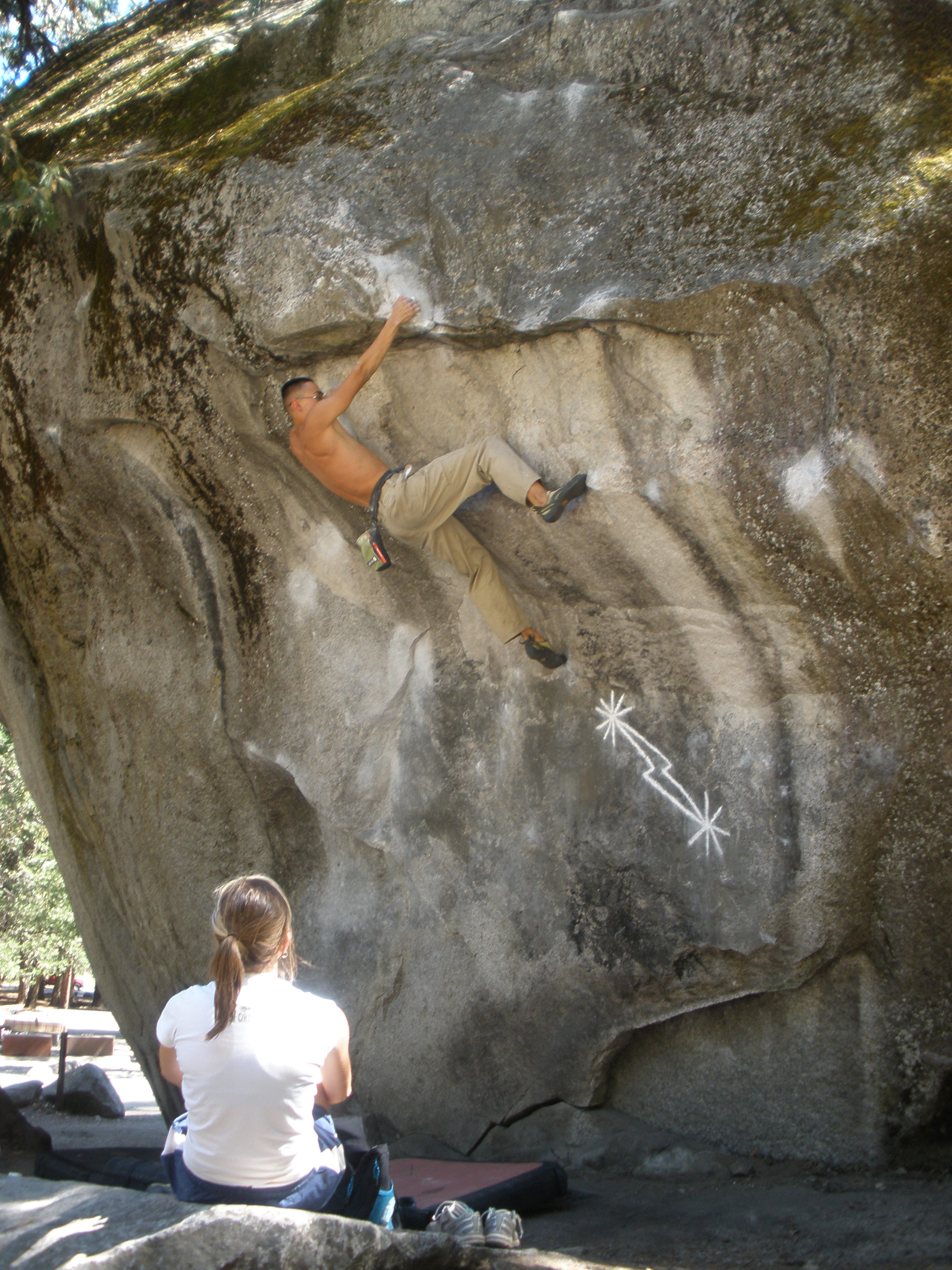
- Michael Rael Armas on Midnight Lightning with its iconic lightning bolt

Highest point
- Coordinates: 37°44′30″N 119°36′9″W

Geography
- Location: Camp 4, Yosemite National Park, California, U.S.

Geology
- Mountain type: Granite boulder

Columbia Boulder is a 30-foot-tall (9.1 m) boulder located in Camp 4 at Yosemite National Park. It is the largest boulder in Camp 4 and easily seen from the campground. According to Mike Borghoff, there are no easy bouldering problems on Columbia Boulder. There are several bouldering problems on Columbia including the iconic Midnight Lightning. Other famous routes on the boulder include: Robbins Eliminate, named after Royal Robbins; Bates Problem, named after Barry Bates; and Ament Arête, named after Pat Ament. In attempts to improve relations between climbers and park rangers, discussions over free coffee usually take place once a week from spring to autumn beside Columbia Boulder.
