= John Bachar =

American rock climber (1957–2009)

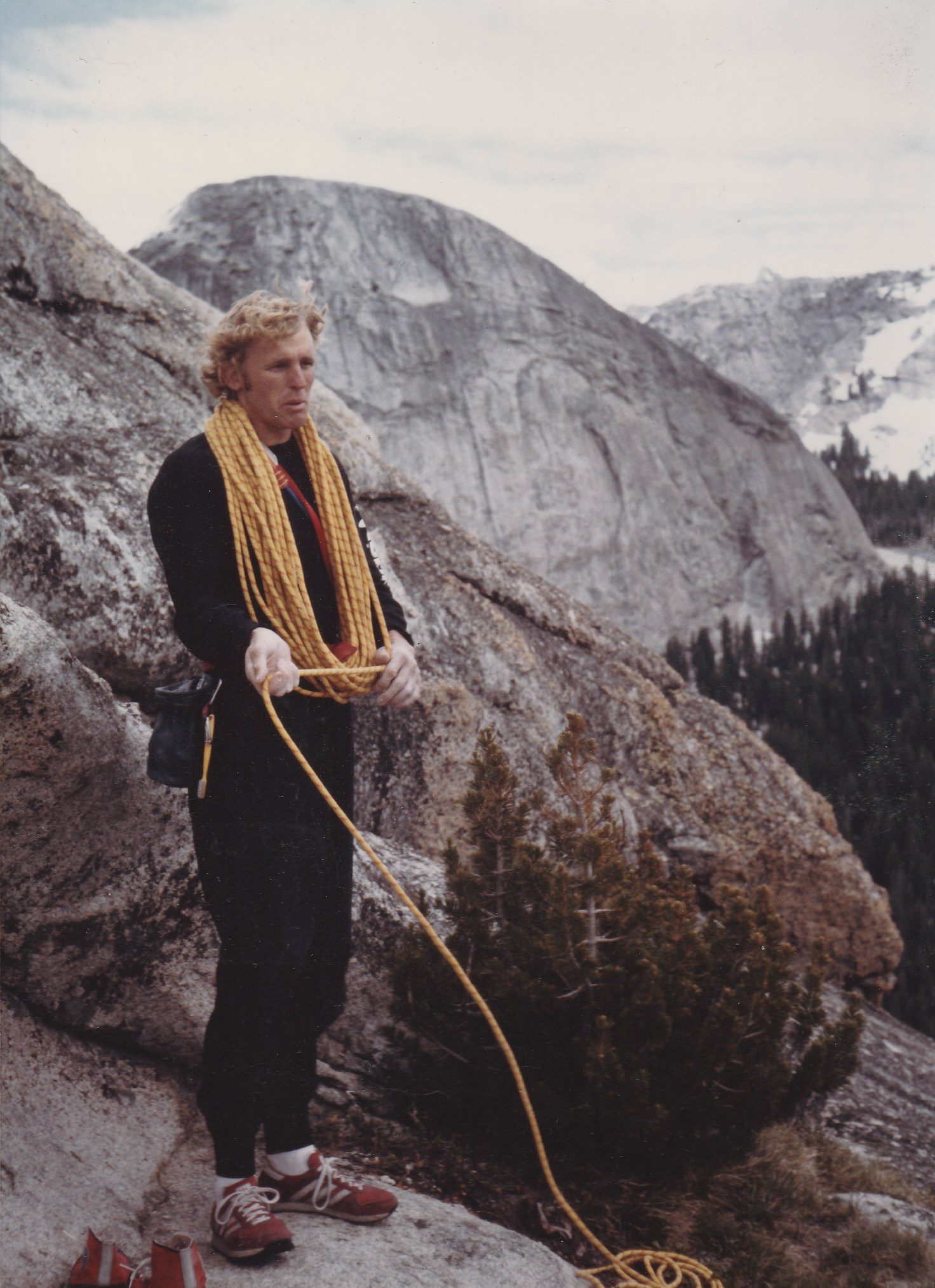
- John Bachar, in Tuolumne Meadows, mid 1980s

Personal information
- Nationality: American
- Born: March 23, 1957
- Died: July 5, 2009 (aged 52) Dike Wall near Mammoth Lakes, California
- Occupation: Rock climber

Climbing career
- Known for: Free soloing

John Bachar (March 23, 1957 – July 5, 2009) was an American rock climber. Noted for his skill at free soloing, he ultimately died during a free solo climb. A fitness fanatic, he was the creator of the climbing training device known as the Bachar ladder.

== Early life and education ==
Bachar was born in 1957. He grew up in Los Angeles, California, and started climbing at the bouldering hot spot of Stoney Point in the northern San Fernando Valley. After attending Westchester High School, graduating in 1974, he attended UCLA, where his father was a math professor, but dropped out to climb full-time. Obsessed with the sport, he immersed himself in books on physical training and nutrition, and soon was able to outperform his fellow climbers. Fellow students at his high school remember him scaling the exterior high school gym walls on many occasions.

== Climbing career ==
John Long, John Yablonski, Ron Kauk and Mike Graham, whom Bachar met in the early 1970s, all free soloed with him, starting with the classic Joshua Tree route Double Cross (5.7). He also put up notorious bouldering problems in Joshua Tree such as Planet X (V6) and So High (V5). The committing crux move of the latter problem is 25 feet (7.6 m) off the ground.

Bachar was first noted for his climbs in Yosemite with his unroped ascents of New Dimensions (5.11a) and The Nabisco Wall, a three-pitch affair (Waverly Wafer (5.10c), either Wheat Thin (5.10c) or Butterballs (5.11c R), and Butterfingers (5.11a) as the final pitch). Noted for his physical fitness, his campsite at Camp 4 was filled with exercise equipment, including the hanging ladders since associated with his name. At his peak he was able to perform a two-finger pull-up with 12.5 pounds (5.7 kg) of weight in his other hand, and two-arm pull-up with over 100 pounds (45 kg) of weight strapped around his waist. While attempting the bouldering problem Midnight Lightning with Kauk and Yablonski in 1978, Bachar drew the iconic lightning bolt in chalk.

Along with Ron Kauk and John Long, Bachar was part of the team that free-climbed the East face of Washington Column, ushering in a new age of free climbing with their first free ascent of Astroman. This route, containing numerous pitches of 5.10 and 5.11 difficulty, set a new standard for long and continuously difficult free climbs. He played a key role in making the first free ascent of the technical and difficult "boulder problem" pitch low on the route.

Bachar was a contemporary of John Long and Tobin Sorenson in a group they called the Stonemasters putting up daring new routes in the Idyllwild, California, area.

Bachar posted a note in 1981 promising a "$10,000 reward for anyone who can follow me for one full day." No one took the challenge. That same year he put up Bachar–Yerian (5.11c R/X) in Tuolumne Meadows with Dave Yerian. A heady testpiece, the 300-foot (91 m) vertical-to-gently-overhanging route is protected by 13 bolts (including anchor bolts), each one placed either from a stance (9) or while hanging from a hook (4). Bachar was a vocal critic of climbing tactics such as bolting on rappel, which came into vogue during the 1980s. However, at the time of the first ascent, there were critics of his decision to place certain bolts from hooks, rather than drilling and placing each bolt from a stance.

In 1986, Bachar and Peter Croft made a link up of El Capitan and Half Dome, climbing a vertical mile in under 14 hours. In the 1990s, Bachar free soloed Enterprise (5.12b) in the Owens River Gorge and The Gift (5.12c) at Red Rocks for the Masters of Stone video series. He was featured in the documentary Bachar: One Man, One Myth, One Legend (2005) by Michael Reardon.

== Personal life ==
Bachar lived in Mammoth Lakes, California, and was the director of design of rock climbing shoe manufacturer Acopa International LLC.

On December 3, 1996, Bachar's only child Tyrus was born to Valerie Vosburg.

On August 13, 2006, Bachar suffered multiple fractured vertebrae in a serious car accident.

== Death ==
On July 5, 2009, Bachar died in a free solo accident at Dike Wall near Mammoth Lakes, California.

== See also ==
- Stonemasters
