= Tony Yaniro =

American rock climber

Personal information
- Born: October 9, 1962 (age 63)
- Occupation: Professional rock climber

Climbing career
- Type of climber: Traditional climbing; Crack climbing; Sport climbing; Competition climbing
- Highest grade: Redpoint: 8a (5.13b)
- First ascents: The Pirate (1978); Alien (1980); Grand Illusion (1979)
- Known for: First-ever person to climb at 8a (5.13b); Creator of the "Yaniro" technique

Tony Yaniro (also spelled as Toni, born 1961 or 1962), is an American professional rock climber known for being the first-ever person in history to redpoint an 8a (5.13b) graded climbing route, and his unique climbing move, the "Yaniro". He has been called one of the founders of modern climbing training, and describes himself as a "father" of sport climbing. He has made a number of first ascents across difficult traditional climbing and sport climbing routes in the United States, and is known for being a pioneer in hand grip development.

His approach to cross training and circuit training to train muscle groups for climbers has had a wide resonance beyond developing sport climbers. His training regimes have been used to develop climbing fitness and endurance in all types of climbers, and have been used by some of the world's leading alpinists and high-altitude mountaineers. He popularized a statement: "If you can't do the moves, then there is nothing to endure".

== Climbing career ==
Tony Yaniro grew up in California and began climbing at age 11 when he discovered the sport at summer camp. In 1974, he made a free ascent up to the first pitch of Anti-Jello Crack (5.10a) and soon gained notoriety for outclimbing veteran climbers at Suicide Rock. At 16 in 1978, Yaniro free climbed The Pirate (5.12d).

=== Ascent of Grand Illusion ===
In 1979, he became the first-ever rock climber in history to climb a route graded 8a (5.13b) with his first free ascent of Grand Illusion, near South Lake Tahoe. It was the most difficult rock climbing route in the world at the time. To summit Grand Illusion, Yaniro made several visits to the site, discretely climbing up and dangling on the top rope, feeling and memorizing the different hand holds that would be necessary to climb the rock. The practice, known as hangdogging, was considered against climbing ethics at the time (although not widely used in redpointing routes). He then made a replica of the crack at home and practiced, building the muscle groups needed to be able to achieve a successful climb. After successfully climbing Grand Illusion, Yaniro's use of hangdogging and practicing at home received criticism from the climbing community. Over time, the climbing community began to see the technique as groundbreaking—now incorporated into the redpoint definition of a first ascent, leading to a shift towards practicing on replica hand holds, improving access to new routes and greater improvements in rock climbing. It also helped propel Yaniro into becoming a pioneer hold creator and manufacturer.

=== Inventor of the Figure Four move ===
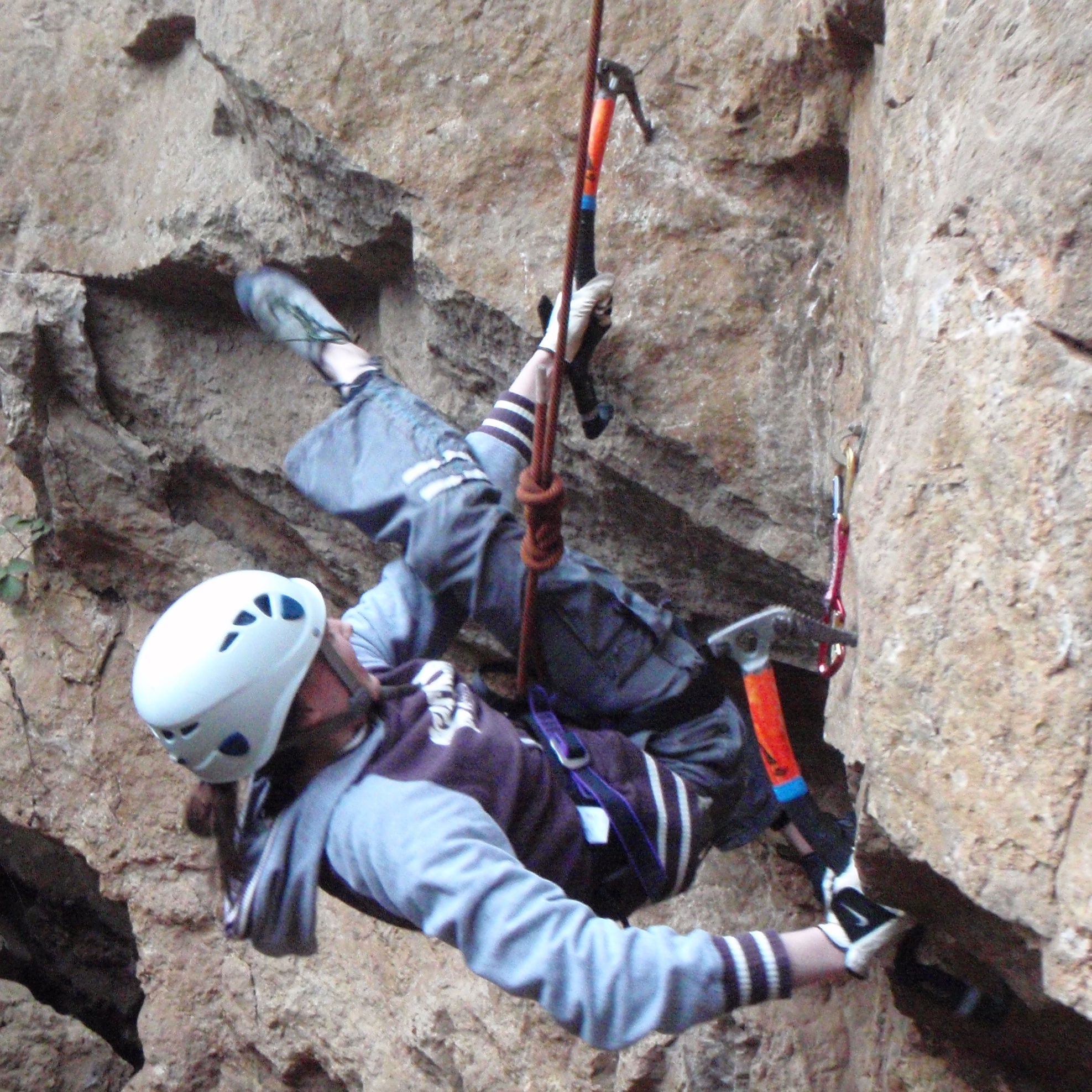
An example of a "Figure-four" or "Yaniro" technique while dry-tooling.

The "Yaniro", also known as a figure-four, is a climbing technique that entails placing one leg above one's opposite elbow to reach a distant handhold. It is a useful technique in situations when there is a lack of obvious foot holds, while wearing crampons, or when ice climbing with only small holds available. It is claimed that the technique was originally performed by Patrick Berhault while traversing La Loubière in 1979. Yaniro popularized the move when he used it on the ascent of Chouca (8a+) in Buoux in the late 1980s at the suggestion of Darius Azin. Afterwards, the move, and its association with Yaniro particularly, became well known in rock climbing circles in France. Elsewhere, the move is more commonly known as a figure-four.

=== Pioneer in training techniques ===
Yaniro also distinguished himself from traditionalists through gym training and preparing extensively in advance of his climbs, in the manner of Wolfgang Gullich in Europe.

In the 1980s, Yaniro and fellow climber Randy Leavitt found an empty parking structure outside of Los Angeles which they used as a makeshift climbing lab to test out new moves and build up their skills prior to climbs. It was in the parking structure gym that Yaniro and Leavitt developed the "Leavittation", a climbing move that involved using a lower limb to gain leverage to climb a horizontal off-width. Another technique of Yaniro's involved wedging one's head and closed fist together in a crack, to gain leverage to pull upwards.

While initially perceived as a rebel in the climbing community, over time, his approach to training and climbing fitness became more recognized. He was acknowledged as a pioneer in the sport, especially for rehearsing difficult movements on routes before climbing them. In the late 1980s he followed his successful approach to climbing Grand Illusion to prepare for climbing Scarface (5.14a) by making hand hold molds out of tinfoil to model the grips he would need to master.

=== Other ===
In 1989, he was featured in To the Limit, an IMAX documentary film by Greg MacGillivray. The film showcases the physiological effects on the human body by action sports athletes. Yaniro is shown climbing El Capitan in the film.

In the early 1990s, Yaniro sold his home and purchased a Winnebago motorhome to travel the country and climb everywhere he could. He attached a foldable climbing wall to the back of the vehicle, allowing him to train on the go. One of the locations he visited for climbing was Oregon's Leslie Gulch, where Yaniro and Tedd Thompson created routes, put up new lines and chipped out holds on the rock face of The Einstein, creating an outdoor climbing gym. Partially due to Yaniro's actions, the Bureau of Land Management developed their policies to manage sport climbing on national land.

He also participated in competition climbing events, placing 52nd in the IFSC Climbing World Cup in Nuremberg in 1993.

During this time, Yaniro supported himself by shaping climbing holds for various companies, and eventually moved to Las Vegas to open a climbing gym. He became known for his innovative hand holds and later moved into designing climbing facilities, opening a gym in Prescott, Arizona. His early hand hold designs, such as the "Yaniro System", have been in production for over thirty years and continue to be used to train sport climbers.

== Personal life ==
Yaniro attended Pacific Union College as a biochemistry major from 1978 to 1981. He later took courses in pathology and biochemistry at Loma Linda University and worked for 12 years in hospital clinical pathology. After leaving school to concentrate on climbing, he returned to complete a doctorate in naturopathic medicine. His wife Kathy, and daughter Dana are also climbers.

== Notable climbs ==
- Yosemite National Park: 1977 El Capitan Dorn Direct (5.9) Alien Finish (5.12b)
- The Needles Kern River Domelands, The Emperor (aka Pea Soup) free climbed(5.12a), Titanic (5.12c) and The Nautilus (5.12) with Ron Carson, Pyromania (5.13b), Roadkill Corner (5.11c)
- Joshua Tree: circa 1970s Little Hunk East: Monkey Business (5.8), Roofing Company (5.10a); 1980 Equinox (7c)
- Lake Tahoe Sugarloaf: 1979 Grand Illusion (5.13b/c)
- Suicide Rock: 1979 Race with the Devil (5.11d)
- City of Rocks, Idaho: 1988 The Heretic (5.13b), 1989 Technicon (5.11d)

== Filmography ==
- On the Rocks, 1985, Katie Johnston
- Upward Bound, 1987, Roger Seiler
- To The Limit, 1989, IMAX documentary by Greg MacGillivray
- Masters of Stone I, 1991 by Eric Perlman
- Fingers of Steel, 1997, Steve Petro
- Rock Climbing, 1998, Michael and Diana Graber
