= Separate Reality (climb) =

Traditional climbing route in the USA

- Location within California
- Location: California, United States
- Coordinates: 37°43′21″N 119°34′53″W
- Climbing area: Yosemite Valley
- Route type: Traditional climbing; Crack climbing
- Rock type: Granite
- Vertical gain: 20 metres (66 ft)
- Pitches: 1
- Technical grade: 5.12a (7a+)
- First free ascent: Ron Kauk (1978)
- First female free ascent: Louise Shepherd (1981)
- First onsight/flash ascent: Louise Shepherd (1981)
- First free solo ascent: Wolfgang Güllich (1986)

Separate Reality is a 66-foot (20 m) traditional climbing route in Yosemite National Park in California. The route is known for its exposed and dramatic crux that consists of a 20-foot (6.1 m) long crack in its horizontal roof. When it was first free-climbed by Ron Kauk in 1978, it was one of the first climbs in the world to have a grade of 7a+ (5.12a) (it was temporarily downgraded one notch when a hold broke in the mid-1980s). In 1986, German climber Wolfgang Güllich free soloed the route, and the photographs by Austrian Heinz Zak became iconic in rock climbing history.

== History ==
The route was first redpointed by Ron Kauk in 1978 and given a difficulty grade of 5.12a (7a+); it was temporarily downgraded to 5.11d (7a) when a block fell off near the lip, sometime in the mid-1980s, exposing a new handhold (but is today graded at 5.12a).

At the time of Kauk's ascent, it was one of the first climbs in the world to have a grade of 5.12a (7a+). Kauk named the route after the 1971 novel A Separate Reality by Carlos Castaneda. Kauk's partner, Lucy Parker, told Alpinist magazine that the book was: "a kind of handbook to help guide some of us back to the magic and mystery of life.... In a time when we don't even stop to ask why, the most important thing is to climb, to search".

In 1979, Ray Jardine made the first repeat of Separate Reality, and the photograph of his climb appeared on the covers of climbing books and magazines around the world, including the cover of Reinhold Messner's 1974 book, The Seventh Grade. In 1981, visiting Australian climber Louise Shepherd, made the first female free ascent of the route, climbing it onsight with no falls.

In 1986, inspired by the photo of Jardine, Wolfgang Güllich traveled to Yosemite, with Austrian photographer and climber Heinz Zak, and made the first free solo of Separate Reality. Güllich's 1986 free solo has since become an iconic feat in climbing history, and was listed on Red Bull's "10 Most Epic Free Solo Climbs". Güllich said after his feat: "An incredible feeling of joy melts all the tension and I suddenly have the impression that it was not a game of gambling with my life; it was not subjectively dangerous. I sit in the sun on the flat summit plateau—the 'other reality' is now part of the past. It is the thought of death that teaches us to value life."

In 2005, 19 years later, Heinz Zak made the second free solo of the route. Zak said that in 1986, a free solo of the route "was completely out of my reach, not physically, but mentally", but that filming Güllich has set off an inner desire that he needed to resolve. To prepare for the free solo, Zak had built a wooden model in his garage. His 2005 free solo was made into a 2017 short climbing film, Träume sterben nie (translated as Dreams never die).

In 2006, Dean Potter completed the first of five free solos he would make of Separate Reality.

== Notable ascents ==
=== Redpoint ===
- 1978. Ron Kauk, first free ascent.
- 1979. Ray Jardine, second free ascent.
- 1981. Louise Shepherd, first female free ascent (and first onsight).

=== Free solo ===
- 1986. Wolfgang Güllich, first free solo; photograph by Heinz Zak became iconic.
- 2005. Heinz Zak, second free solo.
- 2006. Dean Potter, third free solo (Potter would go on to free solo the route five times in total).
- Others who have free soloed Separate Reality include American climber Alex Honnold, and Canadian climber Will Stanhope.

== See also ==
- The Nose (El Capitan), a 5.14a (8b+) route in Yosemite
- Salathé Wall, a 5.13 (7c+) route in Yosemite
- Silence, first climb in the world with a potential grade of 9c (5.15d)
- Jumbo Love, first climb in the world with a consensus grade of 9b (5.15b)
- Realization/Biographie, first/second climb in the world with a consensus grade of 9a+ (5.15a)
- Action Directe, first climb in the world with a consensus grade of 9a (5.14d)
- Hubble, first climb in the world with a consensus grade of 8c+ (5.14c)
