= Barry Bates =

Australian cricketer (1939–2026)

Personal information
- Born: 1 July 1939; Wollongong, Australia
- Died: January 2026 (aged 86)
- Batting: Right-handed
- Bowling: Right arm fast medium
- Source: ESPNcricinfo, 22 December 2016

Barry Bates (1 July 1939 – January 2026) was an Australian cricketer. He played ten first-class matches for New South Wales between 1959/60 and 1960/61. He also played for Illawarra.

== See also ==
- List of New South Wales representative cricketers
