= Mari Gingery =

American rock climber

Personal information

Climbing career
- First ascents: Many in Joshua Tree and Western USA
- Known for: First female-only ascent of The Shield on El Capitan
- Updated on 21 April 2013

Mari Gingery is an American climber. She has climbed in much of the Western United States particularly Joshua Tree, The Needles and Yosemite.

From 1979 to 1983, Gingery climbed with Lynn Hill every weekend in Yosemite, completing an ascent of The Nose and then the first female-only ascent of The Shield on El Capitan over a period of six days. Hill cites her as a significant influence on her climbing.

Gingery competed at sport climbing competition events, placing highly.

Gingery wrote one of the first guidebooks to focus only on bouldering in 1993, Joshua Tree Bouldering: Joshua Tree National Park. She also contributed to John Long's movie Rock Climbing: The Art Of Leading.

She lives both in Los Angeles and Joshua Tree with Mike Lechlinski with whom she frequently climbs, performing many first ascents in traditional style, often on-sight with no hang-dogging.

== Selected first ascents ==
- Big Moe: 5.11- (6b+/6c) – 1980
- Witch Hunt: 5.10b (6a+) – 1980
- Popular Mechanics: 5.9 (5c) – 1977
- White Trash 5.11+ (6c+/7a) – 1991
- Invisibility Lessons: 5.9 (5c) – 1978
- Bighorn Dihedral: 5.10b (6a+) – 1982
- Elephant Walk - Joshua Tree: 5.11d (7a) – 1988
