= Camp 4 (Yosemite) =

- U.S. National Register of Historic Places
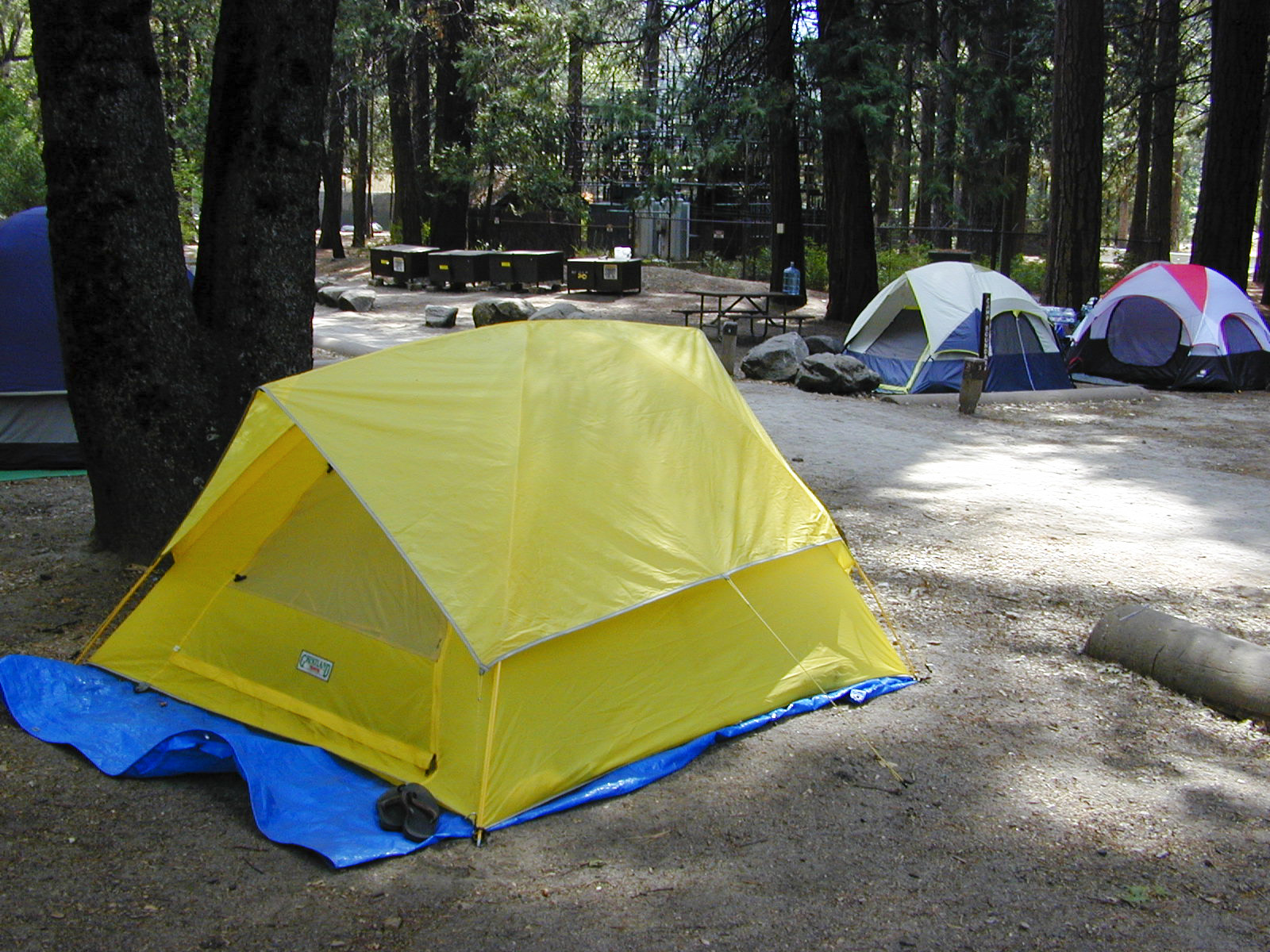
- Camp 4

- Location within California Location within the United States
- Location: Northside Dr., Yosemite National Park, Yosemite, California
- Coordinates: 37°44′30″N 119°36′9″W
- Area: 11 acres (4.5 ha)
- NRHP reference No.: 03000056
- Added to NRHP: February 21, 2003

Camp 4 is a tent-only campground in Yosemite National Park in the United States. It became notable after World War II as "a birthplace of rock climbing’s modern age." It is located at an elevation of 4000 ft (1200 m) on the north side of the Yosemite Valley, close to base of granite cliffs near Yosemite Falls.

Nearby boulders have long been used for bouldering, including the Columbia Boulder, which is known for the boulder problem called the Midnight Lightning, first done by Ron Kauk in 1978. It is easily recognizable by a painting of a white thunderbolt next to it.

== History ==
Physically unimpressive, Camp 4 nevertheless "served as a seedbed for the exchange of ideas, training and the development of new equipment that vastly improved the speed and safety of climbing" (LA Times) during the time from after World War II until around 1970. Dozens of the most famous climbers in the world congregated at Camp 4 for years, learning from each other and trying out new ideas on Yosemite walls such as Half Dome and El Capitan. Yvon Chouinard (today known as founder of the outdoor clothing retailer Patagonia, Inc.) prototyped new kinds of climbing equipment in Camp 4 using an old anvil, and sold them in the nearby parking lot. In 1960, Royal Robbins met future wife Liz Robbins in Camp 4.

From the 1970s on, a new group of climbers led by Jim Bridwell and others based at Camp 4 (known as the "Stone Masters" from 1973 to 80) introduced a more athletic approach to climbing and popularized free climbing.

In the 1990s, Camp 4 was the site of ongoing friction between climbers and the National Park Service. The conflict came to a head in 1997, when flooding in Yosemite Valley destroyed many employee housing units and the Park Service proposed to build a three-story dormitory complex near Camp 4. With the support of other activists, rock climber and climbing equipment manufacturer Tom Frost initiated a lawsuit against the Park Service, arguing that the buildings would disturb the camp's natural setting. The suit was joined by the American Alpine Club. As part of their attempt to stop the construction project, Frost and his attorney Dick Duane also filed an application to have Camp 4 listed on the National Register of Historic Places. The park officials ultimately agreed to stop the development plans and to support the NRHP application, which was granted in 2003, based on the camp's "significant association with the growth and development of rock climbing in the Yosemite Valley during the 'golden years' of pioneer mountaineering".

From 1971 to 1999, Camp 4 was officially known as Sunnyside Walk-in Campground, but has been since renamed Camp 4 in recognition of its historic status. During this era, however, the campsite was known colloquially to climbers as Camp 4. Throughout the period, the campground was the seasonal residence of many of Yosemite Valley's most prominent climbers.

A 2012 rockfall hazard report concluded that several campsites on the northern side of Camp 4 needed to be relocated to achieve adequate safety for climbers.

The 2014 documentary Valley Uprising features veterans of Camp 4 including Warren Harding (dubbed "the original bad boy of Camp 4" for his risk-taking, rebellious attitude, and alcohol consumption), and Beverly Johnson (who in 1973 was part of the first all-female ascent of El Capitan).

== Reservations and availability ==
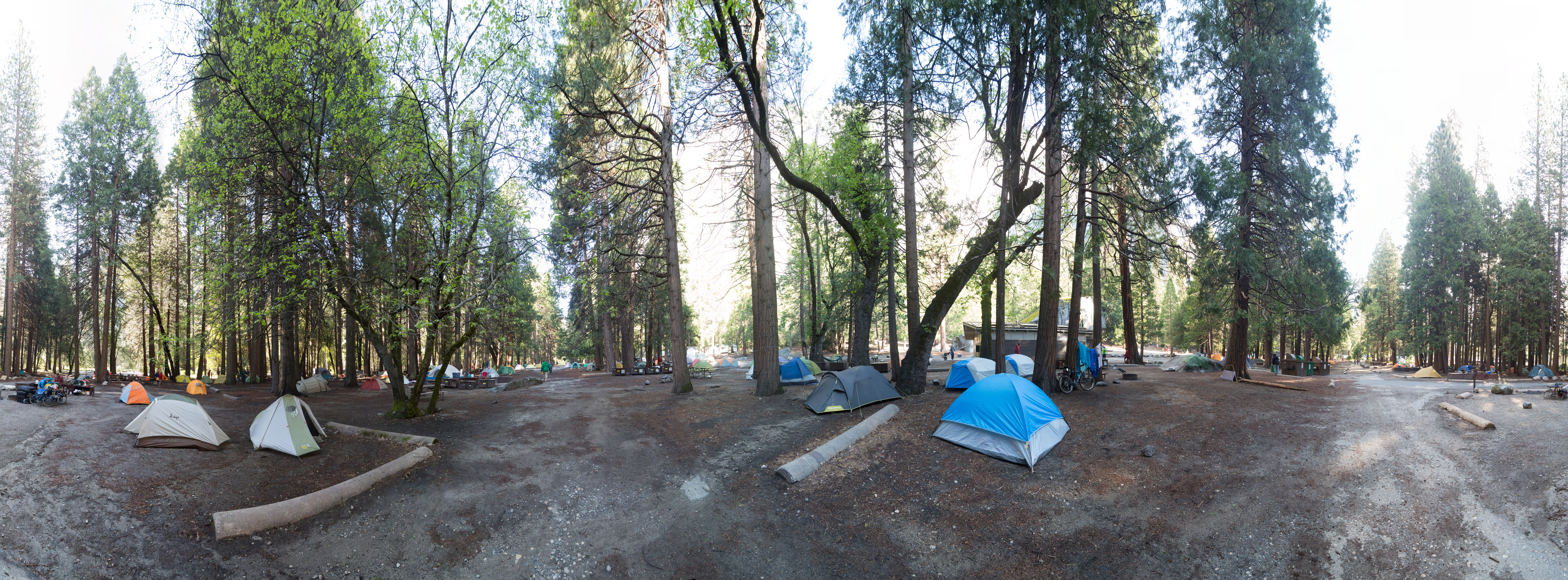
A 360 degree view of the Camp 4 campground in May 2013

Camp 4 does not offer traditional reservations at any time during the year, and the process for attaining a camping site differs depending on the season.

Mid-April through October From April 13 through October 27, 2024, campsites will be available only by reservation via Recreation.gov one week in advance of your arrival date. Up to 6 people can be registered for a site per each reservation transaction. The camping fee is $10 per person per night.

November to mid-April Camp 4 operates on a first-come, first-served basis, usually until sometime in April. The campground may fill early in the morning every day in spring and fall if weather is nice. The camping fee is $10 per night. In spring and fall, a line of those wishing to camp here typically forms at the campground kiosk early in the morning.

A total of 36 sites are available daily, each accommodating a maximum of six people (i.e., 216 spots total) at a cost of US$10 per person per night. Notably, the Park Service has imposed a 30-night camping limit within Yosemite National Park per calendar year; however, from 1 May to 15 September, the camping limit in Yosemite is 14 nights, with only seven of those nights allowed in Yosemite Valley or Wawona. Because of the popularity of the camp, the relatively small number of camp sites, and the lack of reservation availability, it can be difficult to be able to camp at this campground, except for the winter season, which is less busy.

== See also ==
- National Register of Historic Places listings in Yosemite National Park
- National Register of Historic Places listings in Mariposa County, California
