= Ron Kauk =

American rock climber (born 1957)

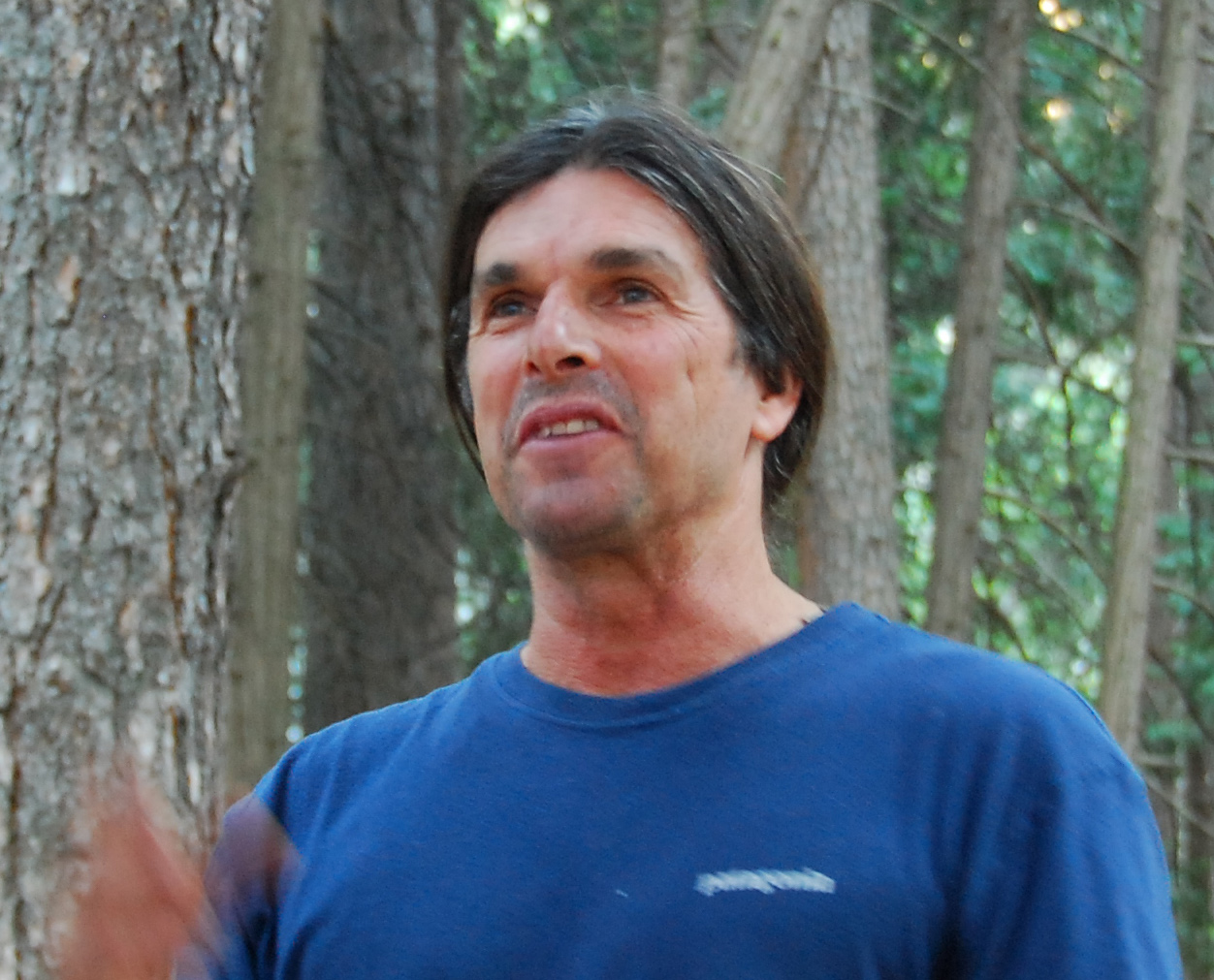

Personal information
- Born: September 23, 1957 (age 68) Redwood City, California, United States

Ron Kauk (born 23 September 1957) is an American rock climber. Kauk is associated with Camp 4 in Yosemite Valley, where he lived for decades, now a resident of El Portal, California.

In 1975, he made the first free ascent of the east face of Washington Column with John Long and John Bachar. In 1978 he climbed the roof crack Separate Reality, without camming devices. The same year he put up Midnight Lightning. In 1979, along with John Roskelley, Kim Schmitz, and Bill Forrest, he made the first ascent of East Face, Uli Biaho, Pakistan. In 1990 he put up the rap-bolted Crossroads and in 1997 he climbed Magic Line on pre-placed gear, both in Yosemite.

== Early life ==
Kauk was born and raised in Redwood City, California.

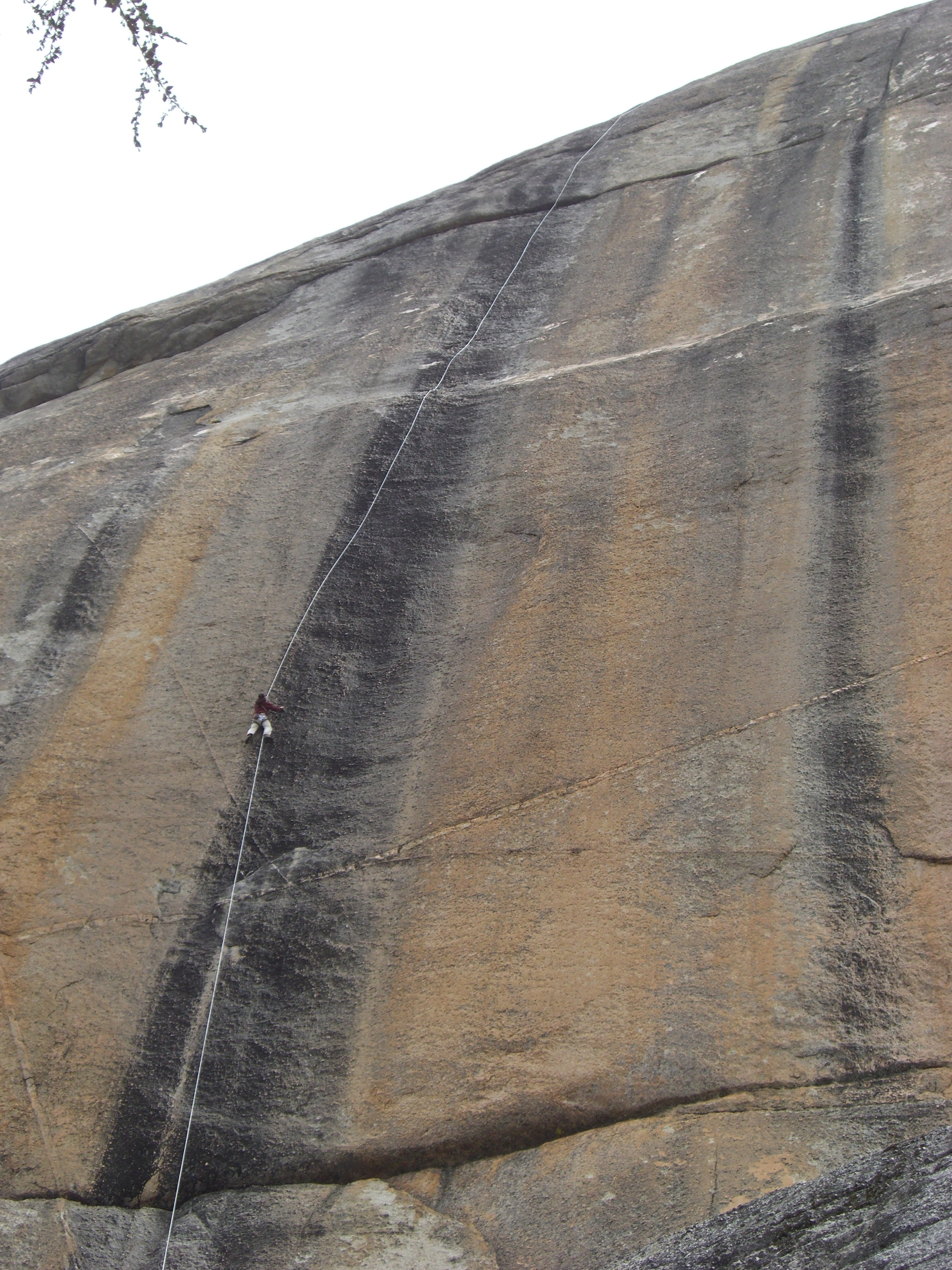
Ron Kauk top roping Bachar-Yerian route (5.11c) on Medlicott Dome, Right Side. Tuolumne Meadows.

== Climbing ==
In 1975, he made the first free ascent of the east face of Washington Column with John Long and John Bachar, renaming the route Astroman (5.11c). Astroman held title as the hardest long free route in Yosemite Valley for a year.

Also notable was Separate Reality (5.12a), an intimidating roof crack which Kauk originally climbed in 1978 without camming devices. The same year he put up Midnight Lightning (V8), one of America's best known bouldering problems because of its difficulty and convenient location in the Camp 4 campground.

In the 1980s Kauk spent time in Europe visiting the limestone crags and competing in sport climbing competitions. He saw how European techniques such as red pointing and bolting on rappel could lead to a higher level of climbing difficulty. However, these practices were frowned upon by some Yosemite regulars. According to one account, Bachar chopped the bolts on Punchline (5.12c) which Kauk installed in 1988, causing a fight between Bachar and Mark Chapman in the Camp 4 parking lot.

Kauk went on to put up the hardest routes in Yosemite, such as the rap-bolted Crossroads (5.13a) in 1990 and Magic Line (5.14c) which he climbed in 1997 on pre-placed gear. In Tuolumne Meadows he rap-bolted a route that Bachar had started in a ground-up style, provocatively naming the route Peace (5.13c/d).

Many of Kauk's exploits have been caught on film. In 1989 he climbed a five pitch route called Backbone (5.13a) at Smith Rock for NBC Sportsworld, and he repeated his toughest first ascents for Eric Perlman's Masters of Stone videos. In 1992, Kauk trained and doubled Sylvester Stallone along with late climber Wolfgang Güllich for Cliffhanger. He also doubled Michael Rooker, Leon, and actress Janine Turner. In 1999 Kauk trained Tom Cruise for the climbing scenes in Mission: Impossible 2.

In 2000 Kauk produced Yosemite: Ascending Rhythms, a climbing video highlighting the scenic splendor of his favorite crag.

Kauk named some of his first ascents (e.g. Astroman, Midnight Lightning) after Jimi Hendrix songs. Books by Carlos Castaneda are another source of names (e.g. Separate Reality, Tales of Power).

== Notable ascents ==
- 1979 East Face, Uli Biaho, Pakistan. First ascent (FA) of route and mountain with John Roskelley, Kim Schmitz, and Bill Forrest. All four climbers reached the summit on July 3, 1979.
- 1975 Astroman, 5.11c, Yosemite, CA. First free ascent (FFA) of route with John Bachar, John Long.
- 1978 Midnight Lightning, V8, Yosemite, CA. First ascent (FA). The most famous boulder problem in the world. A distinctive lightning bolt was drawn in chalk by John Bachar while the boulder was being attempted.

== See also ==
- History of rock climbing
- List of first ascents (sport climbing)
