= Suicide Rock =

Rock formation in California, US

Coordinates: 33°46′15″N 116°41′50″W

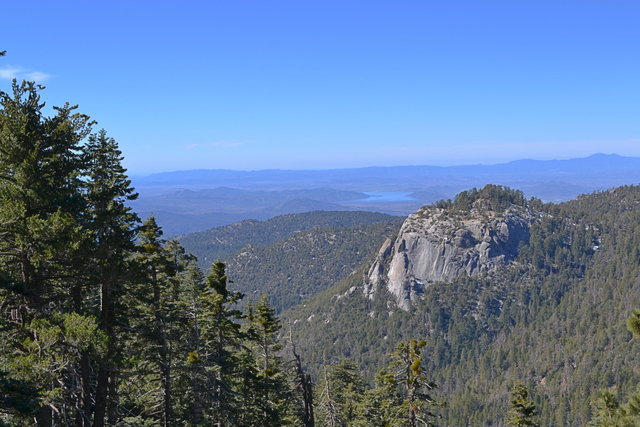
Suicide Rock from the Devil's Slide Trail

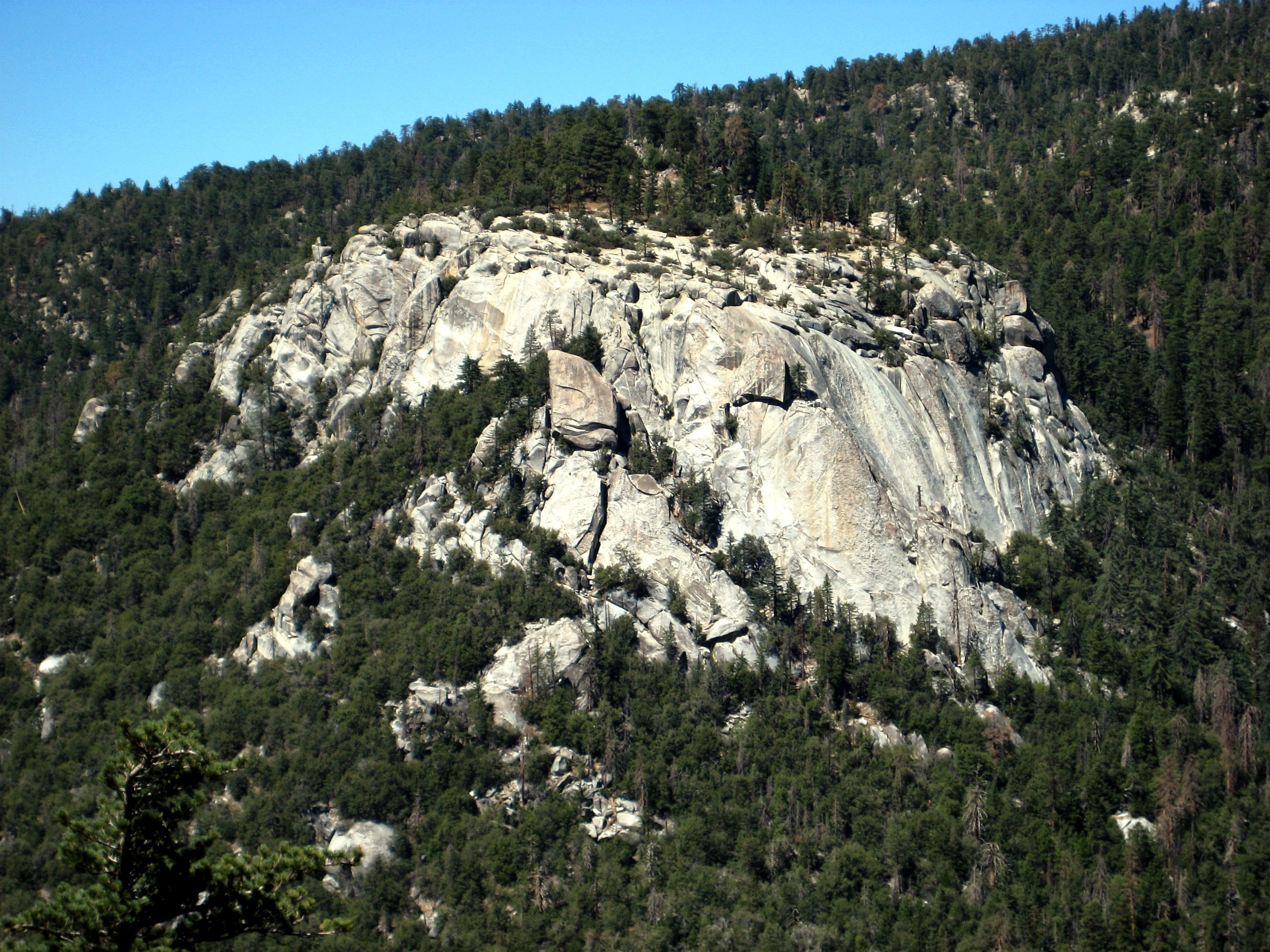

Suicide Rock (once Suicide Peak) is a granite outcrop (7,510 feet (2,290 m)) near Idyllwild, California, which is popular with rock climbers. Over three hundred climbing routes have been described. It is located near Tahquitz Peak.

According to legend, the name of Suicide Rock comes from a story of a Native American princess and her lover who, after being ordered to separate, instead died of suicide by jumping off the rock. It is speculated that this story originated as a derivative of Helen Hunt Jackson's Ramona story, in an attempt to boost tourism to this area in the late 19th century.
