= Get a Little Out There with Alex Honnold =

2026 travel documentary series

- Genre: Travel documentary
- Directed by: J.J. Kelley
- Country of origin: United States
- Original language: English
- No. of seasons: 1
- No. of episodes: 5

Production
- Executive producers: David Klimek; Jeff Moore
- Production location: Nevada
- Running time: 60 minutes

Original release
- Network: Outside TV
- Release: February 26 – March 26, 2026

Get a Little Out There with Alex Honnold is a 2026 travel documentary miniseries hosted by American climber Alex Honnold, showcasing his home state of Nevada. The series aired on Outside TV and was produced together with Travel Nevada, the state's official tourism organization.

Each episode follows Honnold as he visits a different part of the state for "bucket-list adventures", including climbing with friends Tommy Caldwell and Cedar Wright, and tourist attractions such as the Clown Motel.

== Episodes ==
No.	Title	Original release date
1	"Home Means Nevada"	February 26, 2026
Honnold hikes and climbs near his home of Las Vegas, including in the Black Canyon Wilderness and Mount Charleston.
2	"Wild Wild Granites"	March 5, 2026
Honnold completes a first ascent with Tommy Caldwell in the Wild Granites of western Nevada.
3	"Digging Deeper"	March 12, 2026
Honnold visits Tonopah, including the Clown Motel and climbs with Caldwell on Mount Jefferson.
4	"Taking a Peak"	March 19, 2026
Honnold climbs and mountain bikes with Cedar Wright in Great Basin National Park.
5	"Cowboy Country"	March 26, 2026
Honnold and endurance runner Peyton Thomas explore the Ruby Mountains

== See also ==
- Arctic Ascent with Alex Honnold (2024)
- Skyscraper Live (2026)
