= Alex Honnold =

American rock climber (born 1985)

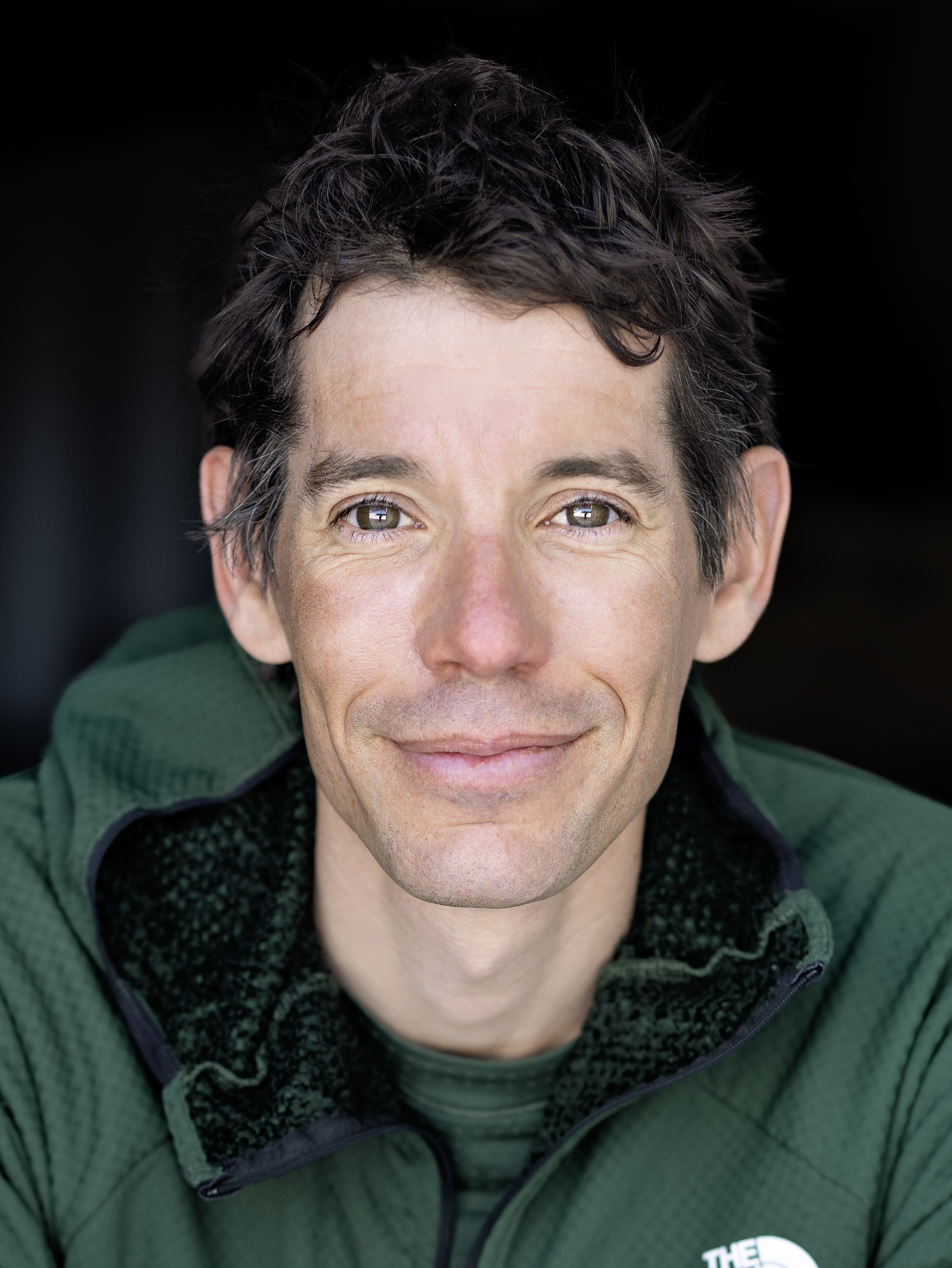
- Honnold in 2023

Personal information
- Born: August 17, 1985 (age 41) Sacramento, California, U.S.
- Occupation: Rock climber
- Spouse: Sanni McCandless (m. 2020)
- Children: 2

Climbing career
- Type of climber: Free solo climbing; Big wall climbing; Bouldering; Sport climbing; Traditional climbing; Competition climbing; Alpine climbing; Buildering
- Highest grade: Redpoint: 5.14d (9a); Bouldering: V12 (8A+); Free solo: 5.13a (7c+)
- Retired from competition: circa 2004
- Known for: First-ever to free solo a 5.13a (7c+) grade big wall route; The first person to free solo a full route (from base to summit) on El Capitan via Freerider (5.13a); Speed record holder on The Nose route of El Capitan; First person to free solo Taipei 101 building

Alexander J Honnold (born August 17, 1985) is an American rock climber best known for his free solo ascents of big wall climbing routes. Honnold rose to worldwide fame in June 2017 when he became the first person to free solo a full climbing route on El Capitan in Yosemite National Park via the 880-metre (2,900 ft) big-wall route known as Freerider at the technical grade of 5.13a, which was the first-ever big-wall free-solo ascent at that grade, a climb described in The New York Times as "one of the great athletic feats of any kind, ever".

In 2015, he won a Piolet d'Or in alpine climbing with Tommy Caldwell for their completion of the enchainment (known as the Fitz Traverse) of the Cerro Chaltén Group (or Fitzroy Group) in Patagonia over five days. On January 25, 2026, he free soloed the Taipei 101 tower in Taipei, Taiwan, the tallest buildering free solo climb in history and graded at circa 5.11.

Honnold is the author (with David Roberts) of the memoir Alone on the Wall (2015) and the subject of the 2018 biographical documentary Free Solo, which won an Academy Award and a BAFTA.

== Early life and education ==
Honnold was born on August 17, 1985, in Sacramento, California. His mother, Dierdre Wolownick (b. 1951), is a community college professor. His father was Charles Honnold (1949–2004). His paternal roots are German, and his maternal roots are Polish. He started climbing in a climbing gym at the age of 5 and was climbing "many times a week" by age 10. He participated in many national and international youth climbing championships as a teenager.

"I was never, like, a bad climber [as a kid], but I had never been a great climber, either," he says. "There were a lot of other climbers who were much, much stronger than me, who started as kids and were, like, instantly freakishly strong – like they just have a natural gift. And that was never me. I just loved climbing, and I've been climbing all the time ever since, so I've naturally gotten better at it, but I've never been gifted."

After graduating from Mira Loma High School as part of the International Baccalaureate Programme in 2003, he enrolled at the University of California, Berkeley, to study civil engineering. His maternal grandfather died, his parents divorced during his first year of college, and Honnold skipped many of his classes to boulder by himself at Indian Rock.

== Climbing career ==
Honnold dropped out of Berkeley and spent time living at home and driving around California to go climbing. "I'd wound up with my mom's old minivan, and that was my base," he said. "I'd use it to drive to Joshua Tree to climb or I'd drive to LA to see my girlfriend. I destroyed that van fairly quickly; it died on me one day, and for the next year, I lived just on my bicycle and in a tent."

In 2007, he bought a 2002 Ford Econoline E150 van, which allowed him to focus on climbing and following the weather.

According to a 2011 Alpinist profile:

In the mind of the climbing world, Honnold emerged from the goo fully formed. In 2006 nobody had heard of him. In 2007 he free soloed Yosemite's Astroman and the Rostrum in a day, matching Peter Croft's legendary 1987 feat, and suddenly Honnold was pretty well-known. A year later, he free soloed the 1,200-foot (366m), 5.12d finger crack that splits Zion's Moonlight Buttress. The ascent was reported on April 1. For days, people thought the news was a joke. Five months afterward, Honnold took the unprecedented step of free soloing the 2,000-foot (610m), glacially bulldozed Regular Northwest Face of Half Dome. Croft called this climb the most impressive ropeless ascent ever done.

He gained mainstream recognition after his 2008 free solo of the Regular Northwest Face of Half Dome was featured in the film Alone on the Wall and a subsequent 60 Minutes interview.

In November 2011, Honnold and Hans Florine missed setting the speed climbing record on the famous Nose big-wall crack climbing route on Yosemite's El Capitan by 45 seconds. At the time the record stood at 2:36:45, as set by Dean Potter & Sean Leary in November 2010. On June 17, 2012, Honnold and Florine set a new record of 2:23:46 (or 2:23:51) on that same route.

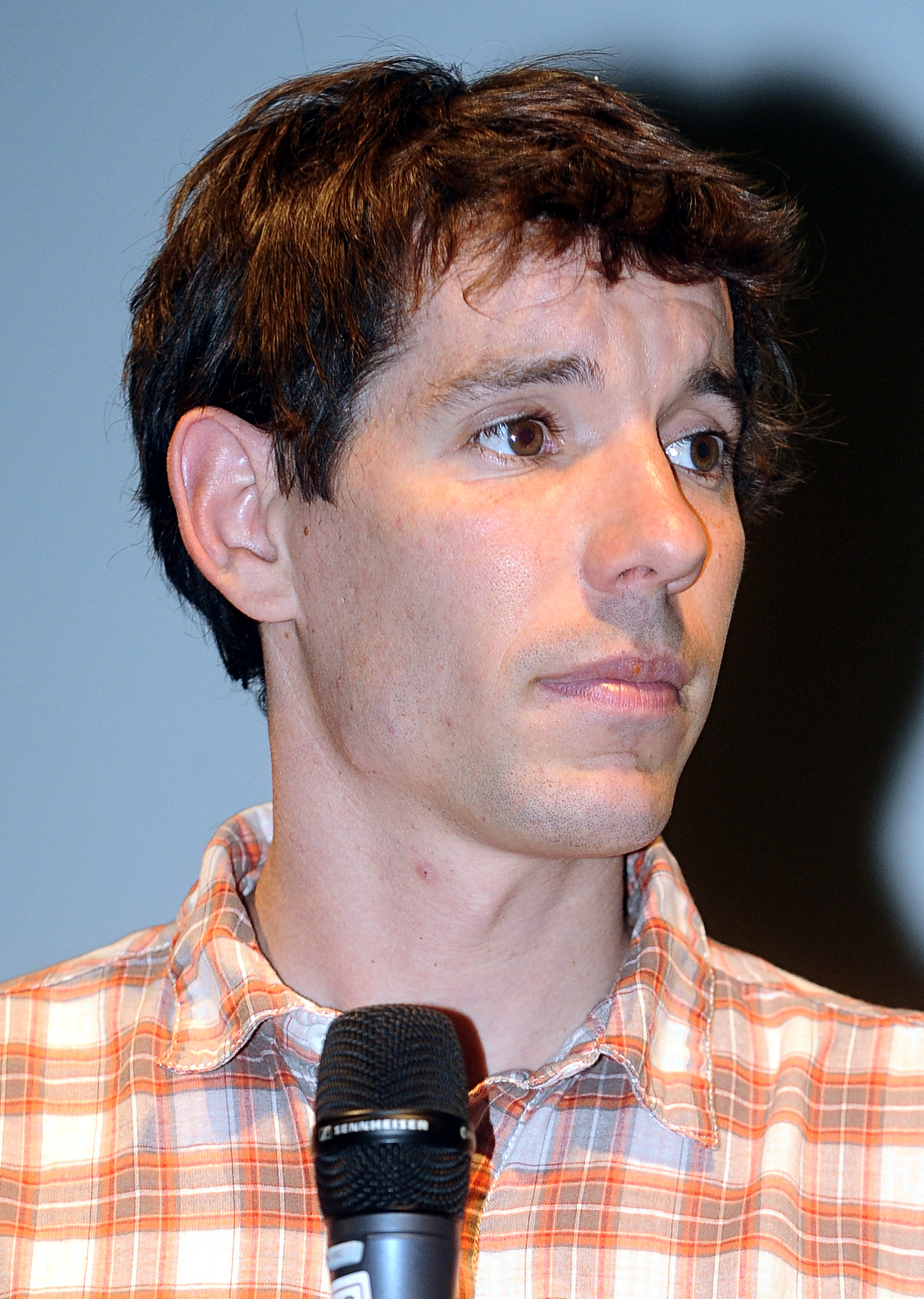
Honnold at the Trento Film Festival in 2014

In November 2014, Clif Bar announced that they would no longer sponsor Honnold, along with Dean Potter, Steph Davis, Timmy O'Neill and Cedar Wright. "We concluded that these forms of the sport are pushing boundaries and taking the element of risk to a place where we as a company are no longer willing to go," the company wrote in an open letter.

In 2016, he was subjected to functional magnetic resonance imaging scans that revealed that, like other high sensation seekers, his amygdala barely activates when watching disturbing images. He however confesses feeling fear occasionally. Through imagination and practice, he has desensitized himself to most fearful situations.

=== El Capitan ===
On June 3, 2017, he made the first-ever free solo ascent of El Capitan by completing Alex Huber's 884 m (2,900 ft) big-wall crack climbing route, Freerider (5.13a VI), in 3 hours and 56 minutes. The climb, described as "one of the great athletic feats of any kind, ever," was documented by climber and photographer Jimmy Chin and documentary filmmaker E. Chai Vasarhelyi, as the subject of the documentary Free Solo. Among other awards, the film won the Academy Award for Best Documentary Feature (2018).

On June 6, 2018, Honnold teamed up with Tommy Caldwell to break the Nose on El Capitan speed record in Yosemite. They completed the approximately 914 m (3,000 ft) route in 1:58:07, becoming the first climbers to complete it in under two hours.

=== Docuseries and podcast ===
In 2021, National Geographic signed Honnold for an original docuseries about his quest to climb across the peaks of Greenland. In the same year, Honnold started a podcast about climbing called Climbing Gold. In its first season, Climbing Gold focused on telling stories of extraordinary climbers across history and featured notable climbers and ascents including Lynn Hill, John Gill, Beth Rodden, Hans Florine, and coverage of the 2020 Tokyo Olympics, which featured competition climbing for the first time.

On October 12, 2022, Honnold completed the "Honnold Ultimate Red Rock Traverse", or HURT, in Red Rock Canyon National Conservation Area. In total, the endeavor took 32 hours and 6 minutes, with Honnold covering 35 miles of running, scrambling, and climbing, logging 24,000 feet of elevation gain, and summitting 18 out of the 23 peaks in Red Rock Canyon. Targeting the area's classic climbing routes, including Epinephrine, Dark Shadows, and Olive Oil, Honnold completed 126 pitches with about 13,000 feet of technical climbing.

=== Taipei 101 ===
In 2025, Honnold announced his intention to free solo the 508 m (1,667 ft) tall Taipei 101, a Taiwanese skyscraper and the 11th tallest building in the world. He completed the climb on January 25, 2026, while being streamed live on Netflix in a special titled Skyscraper Live. The upcoming climb was parodied by Saturday Night Live in a sketch featuring Mikey Day as Honnold, and Finn Wolfhard from Stranger Things.

Honnold was scheduled to climb Taipei 101 on January 24, 2026, but the climb was delayed a day due to inclement weather. On January 25, 2026, after 1 hour and 36 minutes, he reached the top of the spire, becoming the second person to do so after Frenchman Alain Robert and the first person to do it without the use of a rope. Honnold graded the route in the 5.11 (6c+) range.

== Personal life ==
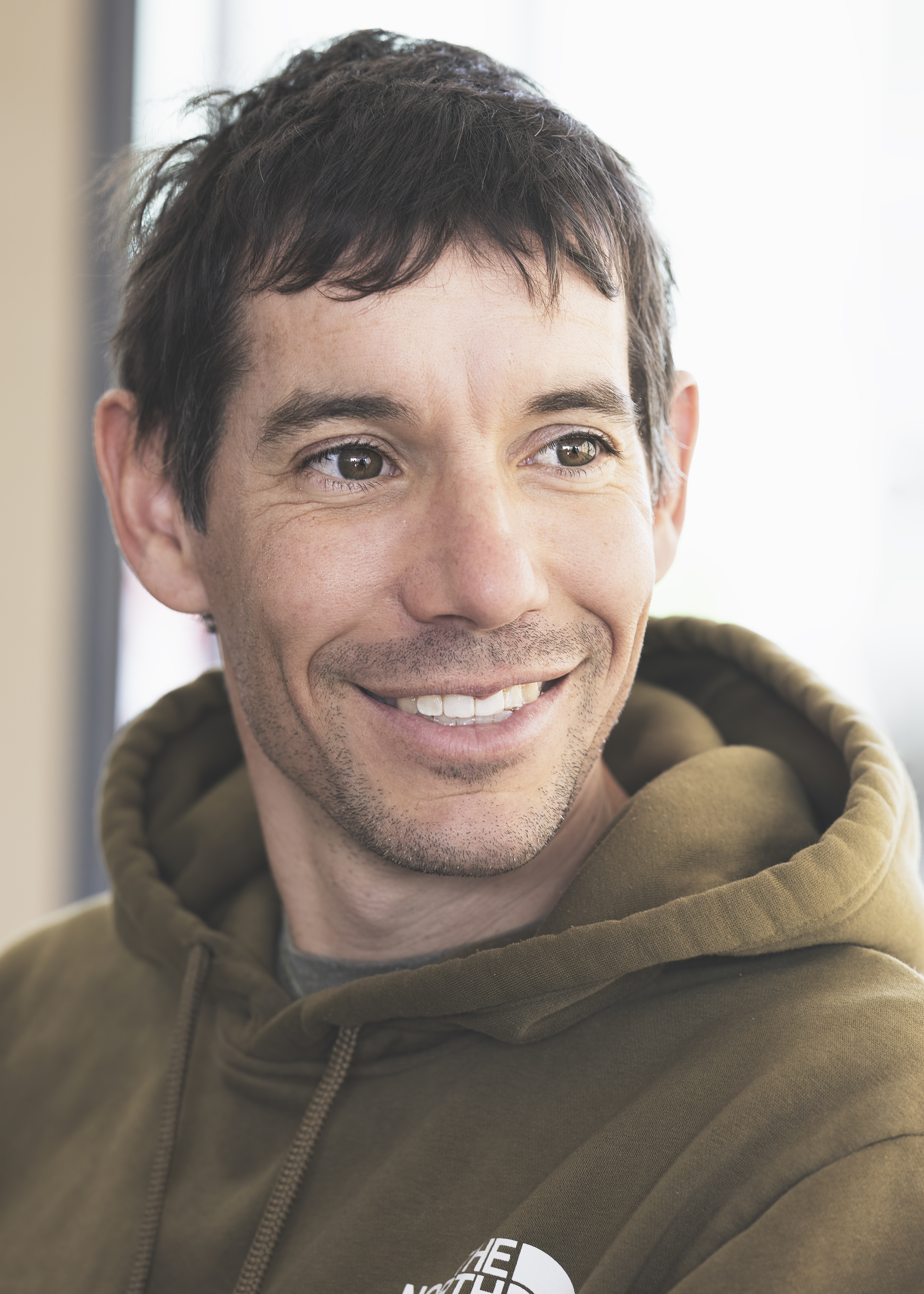
Honnold in 2022

Honnold lived in a van for over a decade. "I don't think 'van life' is particularly appealing," he says. "It's not like I love living in a car, but I love living in all these places. I love being in Yosemite; I love being basically wherever the weather is good; I love being able to follow good conditions all over. And be relatively comfortable as I do it. And so that pretty much necessitates living in a car ... If I could, like, miraculously teleport a house from place to place, I'd prefer to live in a nice comfortable house. Though, honestly, the van is kind of nice. I like having everything within arm's reach. When I stay in a hotel room – like, sometimes you get put up in a really classy hotel room, and it's really big, and you have to walk quite a ways to the bathroom, and you're like, 'Man, I wish I had my [pee] bottle.' Who wants to walk all the ways to the bathroom in the middle of the night when you could just lean over and grab your bottle and go?"

The van he lived in was custom-outfitted with a kitchenette and cabinets.

In 2017, Honnold bought a home in the Las Vegas area. "I didn't have any furniture at first, so I lived in the van in the driveway for the first couple weeks. It felt more like home than an empty house did." Around the same time, he replaced the Ford Econoline van he had lived in since 2007 and put 200,000 miles (320,000 km) on a new 2016 Ram ProMaster, which he still lives and travels in for most of the year.

Honnold is a vegetarian, and he does not drink alcohol or use drugs. Between climbs, he runs or hikes to maintain fitness. He is an avid reader with interests in classic literature, environmentalism, and economics, and he describes himself as an anti-religion atheist and a feminist.

Honnold met Sanni McCandless at a book signing in November 2015; they became a couple soon after. Sanni and her relationship with Honnold feature prominently in Free Solo. In the documentary, it is revealed that once while belaying Honnold, McCandless accidentally let the end of the rope slip through her belay device, causing Honnold to fall a significant distance and injure his back. Despite the injuries, she convinced him to continue their relationship when he initially wanted to break it off with her. On December 25, 2019, Honnold announced, via social media, that he and McCandless were engaged. On September 13, 2020, Honnold announced via Instagram that he and McCandless had married. Honnold's and McCandless's daughter, June, was born on February 17, 2022. Their second daughter, Alice Summer, was born on February 6, 2024.

Dierdre Wolownick, Alex Honnold's mother, started climbing at age 60 and is the oldest woman to climb El Capitan (first at the age of 66 and then, breaking her record, again at age 70).

== Philanthropy ==
In 2012, Honnold began giving away one-third of his income to solar energy projects, to increase energy access worldwide. Soon, this idea expanded to form the Honnold Foundation, which prioritizes a "trust-based philanthropic approach". Per Honnold, "in climbing, you trust your partner with your life. Why should philanthropy be any different?"

== Books ==
- Alone on the Wall: Alex Honnold and the Ultimate Limits of Adventure. London: Pan, 2015. Co-authored with David Roberts. ISBN 978-1447282730.

== Filmography ==
While Honnold is best known for his starring role in the Oscar-winning documentary Free Solo, he has also appeared in several other films and television episodes.

- The Sharp End (2007)
- Alone on the Wall (2008)
- Progression (2009)
- Honnold 3.0 (2012)
- Valley Uprising (2014)
- A Line Across the Sky (2015)
- Showdown at Horseshoe Hell (2015)
- Africa Fusion (2016)
- Queen Maud Land (2018)
- Free Solo (2018)
- The Nose Speed Record (reel rock 14) (2019)
- Fine Lines (2019)
- Duncanville (2020) (TV)
- The Alpinist (2021)
- Explorer: The Last Tepui (2022)
- Edge of the Unknown with Jimmy Chin (2022)
- Arctic Ascent with Alex Honnold (2024)
- The Devil's Climb (2024)
- "The Sound" (2025)
- Skyscraper Live (2026)
- Get a Little Out There with Alex Honnold (2026)

== Awards ==
- 2010: Golden Piton Award from Climbing magazine, for endurance climbing
- 2010: The film Alone on the Wall was shown at the European Outdoor Film Tour
- 2015: Honnold, together with Tommy Caldwell was awarded the Piolets d'Or, for the first full traverse of the Fitz Roy Range in Patagonia, Argentina.
- 2018: Robert and Miriam Underhill Award from American Alpine Club, for excellence in various fields of climbing
- 2018: Special mention of Piolets d'Or for his outstanding contribution to climbing during 2017

== Selected climbs ==
=== Big wall climbing ===
Year	Route	Location	Style	Height	Time	Difficulty	Notes
2007	Freerider	Yosemite	Free ascent	3,000 ft / 37 pitches	One day	VI 5.13a	One day free ascent with Brian Kimball
2007	Astroman and The Rostrum	Yosemite	Free solo	10 + 8 pitches	One Day	5.11c, 10 pitches	First-ever repeat of Peter Croft's 1987 'free solo in one day'
2007	Salathé Wall	Yosemite	Free ascent	3,000 ft / ~35 pitches		VI 5.13b/c	Eleventh free ascent
2008	Bushido and Hong Kong Phooey	Utah	Traditional			5.13+, 5.13b–5.14	Climbed two challenging crack routes in Utah.
2008	Moonlight Buttress	Zion, Utah	Free solo	1,200 ft / 9 pitches	83 minutes	V 5.12d, 1200 ft	First free solo
2008	Regular Northwest Face of Half Dome	Yosemite	Free solo	2,000 ft / 23 pitches	2 hours 50 minutes	5.12a	First free solo
2012	The Nose	Yosemite, El Capitan	Speed climb	2,900 ft / ~31 pitches	2:23:46	VI 5.8 A2	Former speed record of 2:23:46 with Hans Florine
2012	The Regular Northwest Face of Half Dome	Yosemite	Speed solo	2,000 ft / 23 pitches	1:22	5.12a	
2012	Fiesta de los Biceps	Riglos, Aragon, Spain	Free solo (flash)	242 m (800 ft) / 7 pitches		7a	
2012	Yosemite Triple Crown	Yosemite	Link-up		18:50	Various	Solo link-up of three iconic Yosemite routes. (Mt. Watkins, El Capitan, and Half Dome)
2014	Pre Muir	Yosemite, El Capitan	Free climb			V 5.13c/d	Climbed with Josh McCoy.
2014	Muir Wall – Shaft Variation	Yosemite, El Capitan	Speed climb		12 Hours	V 5.13b/c	Speed record ascent.
2014	El Corazon	Yosemite, El Capitan	Speed climb		15:30	V 5.13b	Speed record ascent.
2014	El Sendero Luminoso	El Potrero Chico, Mexico	Free solo	1,750 ft, 15 pitch	Just over 3 hours	V 5.12d	First free solo ascent
2014	University Wall	Squamish, British Columbia, Canada	Free solo	8 pitches	2 hours (car-to-car)	5.12a C2	First free solo
2016	Complete Scream	Northern Ireland, United Kingdom	Free Solo	200 ft		E8 6b	Notable climb in Northern Ireland.
2017	Freerider	Yosemite, El Capitan	Free solo	3,000 ft / 37 pitches	3 hours 56 minutes	5.13a VI	First-ever big wall free solo at the grade of 5.13a (7c+).
2018	The Nose	Yosemite, El Capitan	Speed Climb	2,900 ft / ~31 pitches	1:58:07	VI 5.8 A2	Speed record with Tommy Caldwell
2019	El Niño	Yosemite, El Capitan	Free climb	3,000 ft		VI 5.13c	Second entirely free ascent via the Pineapple Express variation with Brad Gobright.
2019	Passage to Freedom	Yosemite, El Capitan	Free climb	3,000 ft		VI 5.13d	First free ascent with Tommy Caldwell
2022	Pool Wall	sea cliff in eastern Greenland	Free ascent	1,500-foot		5.12c	Climbed with Hazel Findlay and Mikey Schaefer
2022	Ingmikortilaq	sea cliff in eastern Greenland	Free ascent	3,750-foot		5.11- X	First ascent of a sea cliff, climbed with Hazel Findlay.
2023	The Heart Route	Yosemite, El Capitan	Free climb	3,000 ft		VI 5.13b, V10	Third free ascent
2024	Salathé Wall	Yosemite, El Capitan	Free climb	3,500 ft / 35 pitches		VI 5.13b	Speed record ascent
2024	Triple Rainbow	Rainbow Wall, USA	Free climb	Dreefee (11 pitch 5.13d), Desert Solitare (11 pitch 5.13b) and Rainbow Country (13 pitch 5.12d).		5.13d	First free ascent of a link up of Dreefee, Desert Solitare and Rainbow Country

=== Bouldering ===
Year	Route	Location	Style	Height	Time	Difficulty	Notes
2010	Ambrosia	Bishop, California	Bouldering			V11 8A	Second ascent
2011	The Mandala	Bishop, California	Bouldering			V12 8A+	
2012	Too Big to Flail	Bishop, California	Bouldering			V10 7C+ or 8b (5.13d)	First ascent

=== Buildering ===
Year	Route	Location	Style	Height	Time	Difficulty	Notes
2026		Taipei, Taiwan	Free solo	1,667 ft (508 meters)	1 hour 32 minutes	Honnold estimated it at circa 5.11 (6c+)	Streamed on Netflix live

=== Single pitch (sport and traditional) climbing ===
Year	Route	Location	Style	Height	Time	Difficulty	Notes
2008	Parthian Shot, New Statesman, Meshuga (solo)	London Wall, on-sight solo; in England.	Free solo			Varies	Multiple solos and flashes
2010	The Green Mile	Jailhouse crag, San Francisco	Sport climb			5.14c(8c+)	
2010	Rainbow Arch	Ennedi Desert, Chad	Top-rope			5.12+	First ascent
2011	Heaven and Cosmic Debris	Yosemite National Park	Free solo			5.12d, 5.13b	
2011	The Phoenix	Yosemite National Park	Free solo			5.13a	The Phoenix was the first-ever consensus 5.13a in history.
2011	Cobra Crack	Squamish, British Columbia	Traditional climb			5.14b	Ascent is etched in a board between that of Will Stanhope and Pete Whittaker
2019	Arrested Development	Mount Charleston, Nevada	Sport climb			9a 5.14d	Second ascent of sport climbing route after Jonathan Siegrist.
2024	Manphibian	Mount Charleston, Nevada	Sport climb			9a 5.14d	

=== Alpine climbing ===
Year	Route	Location	Style	Height	Time	Difficulty	Notes
2009	Unnamed	Low's Gully, Borneo	Attempted free ascent			VI 5.12 A2	Attempted first free ascent
2014	The Fitz Roy Traverse	Fitz Roy massif, Patagonia	Alpine	5,000 m	5 Days	5.11d C1 65 degrees, 5000m	Completed over five days with Tommy Caldwell
2016	Torre Traverse	Patagonia	Alpine		Under 21 Hours		Second traverse (north-to-south) of the Cerro Torre Group. Completed with Colin Haley.
2023	Diablo Traverse	Devils Thumb, Alaska	Alpine		Under 24 Hours	5.10 A2	Second traverse of the range. Completed with Tommy Caldwell.

== See also ==
- History of rock climbing
- List of grade milestones in rock climbing
