= Alpinist (magazine) =

American mountaineering magazine

- Editor: Derek Franz
- Frequency: Quarterly
- First issue: 2002
- Company: Height of Land Publications
- Country: United States
- Based in: Jeffersonville, Vermont
- Language: English
- Website: www.alpinist.com
- ISSN: 1540-725X

Alpinist is an American quarterly magazine focused on mountain literature and mountaineering ascents worldwide.

== History and profile ==
Alpinist was founded in 2002 and was originally published out of Jackson, Wyoming. It was resurrected in 2009 and is now based in Jeffersonville, Vermont.

The magazine often focuses on "fast and light" ascents and advocates a rigorous clean-climbing style (not leaving gear behind).

Alpinist won the Maggie Award for Best Overall Design/Consumer Category from the Western Publication Association (WPA) for its Autumn issue (Issue 8) in 2005, and the Maggie Award for the Best Quarterly/Consumer Division in April 2004 for its Winter 2003–2004 issue (Issue 5).

On October 16, 2008 the magazine announced that it was closing operations due to financial problems. The magazine was re-launched on April 15, 2009, with Michael Kennedy as the new Editor-in-Chief, by Height of Land Publications, home of Telemark Skier and Backcountry magazines.

In May 2012, Kennedy was replaced as editor-in-chief by longtime contributing editor Katie Ives.

In August 2022, Ives retired and Derek Franz was named as the new editor in chief.

Over the years, notable Alpinist contributors have included David Roberts, Steve House, Marko Prezelj, Kyle Dempster, Steve Swenson, Ian Parnell, Hayden Kennedy, Pat Deavoll, Dean Potter, Nick Bullock, Andy Kirkpatrick, Marc-Andre Leclerc, Brette Harrington, Sibylle Hechtel, Tamotsu Nakamura, Alex Honnold and Tommy Caldwell.

== See also ==
- Summit magazine
- Climbing magazine
- Rock & Ice
