= Ingmikortilaq =

Sea cliff in eastern Greeland

- Location within Greenland

Highest point
- Elevation: 1,150 m (3,770 ft)
- Coordinates: 71°51′50″N 27°56′41″W

Naming
- English translation: The Separate One
- Language of name: Greenlandic

Geography
- Location: NE Greenland National Park, Greenland

Geology
- Rock age: Neogene
- Mountain type: Granite rock

Climbing
- First ascent: August 16, 2022, Alex Honnold & Hazel Findlay
- Easiest route: Northeast Ridge

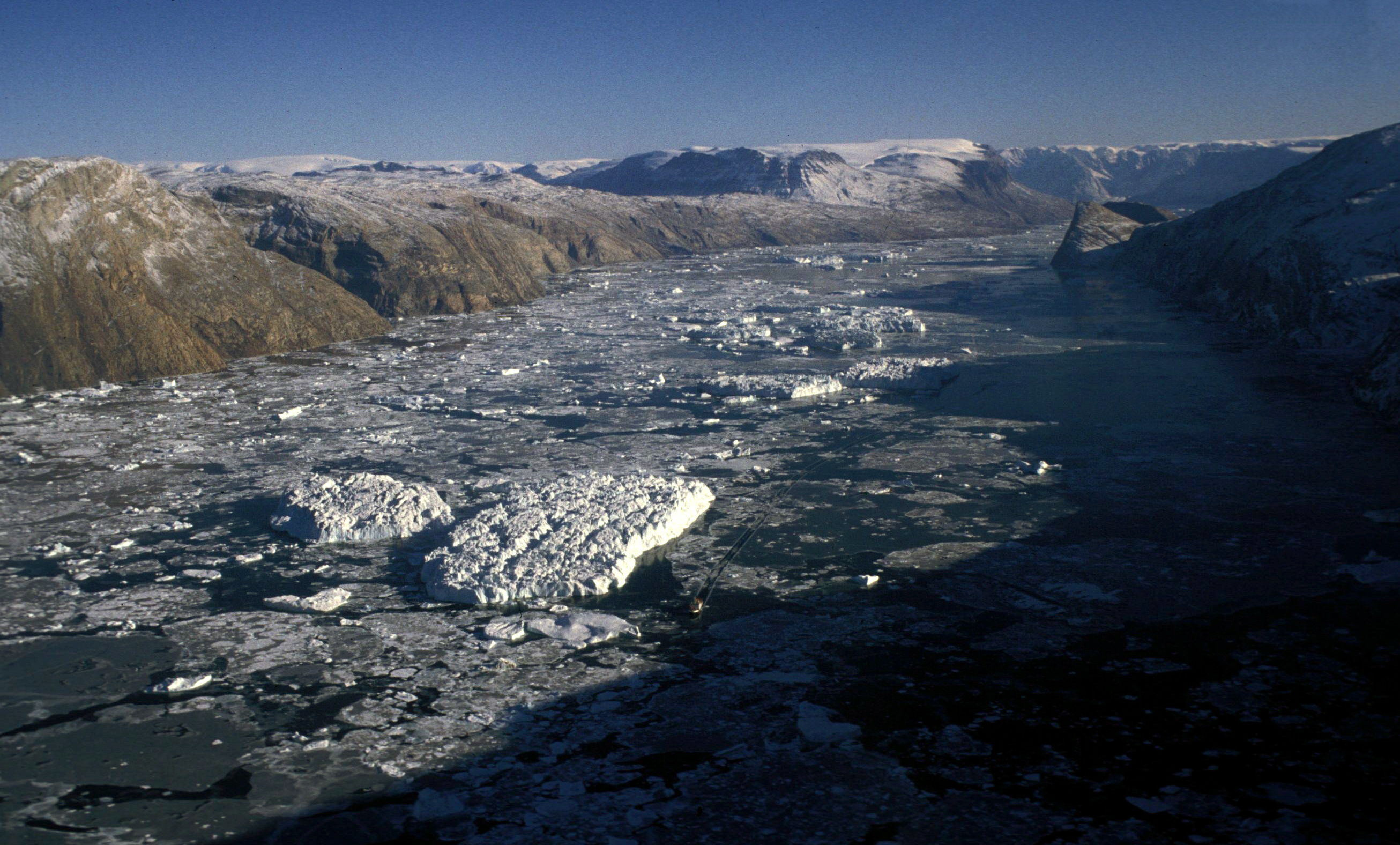
The Daugaard-Jensen Glacier.

Ingmikortilaq (Greenlandic: The Separate One) is a sea cliff in eastern Greenland. It rises around 3,750 ft (1,140 m) from base to summit. It is best known for Alex Honnold's and Hazel Findlay's climb of the sea cliff, documented on Arctic Ascent with Alex Honnold.

Ingmikortilaq is located in Nordvestfjord at the toe of the Daugaard-Jensen Glacier. The summit can only be reached by climbing the cliff, with the only known route being the Northeast Ridge.

== Geology ==
The sea cliff is made out of gneiss and granite, and is dated to be somewhere around 3 million years old.

== Climbing history ==
The first and only ascent of Ingmikortilaq was in August 2022, when climbers Alex Honnold and Hazel Findlay climbed the sea cliff.

== Popular culture ==
=== In film and TV ===
Ingmikortilaq was the main focus of Arctic Ascent with Alex Honnold, a docuseries on Disney+.
