= Pool Wall (mountain) =

Mountain in Greenland

- Location within Greenland

Highest point
- Elevation: 457 m (1,499 ft)
- Coordinates: 71°11′41″N 26°51′56″W

Naming
- Language of name: English

Geography
- Location: NE Greenland National Park, Greenland

Geology
- Rock age: Neogene
- Mountain type: Gneiss rock

Climbing
- First ascent: August 16, 2022, Alex Honnold, Hazel Findlay, Mikey Schaefer, Aldo Kane, Adam Kjeldsenlt, & Heidi Sevestre.
- Easiest route: Two Ravens

Pool Wall is a mountain with a dramatic sheer sea cliff that is found in the Northeast Greenland National Park. The gneiss cliff is around 450 meters (1,500 feet) high from base to summit. The top of Pool Wall can only be reached by big wall climbing techniques, with the only known climbing route being the Two Ravens, which was first free climbed by a team led by Alex Honnold and Hazel Findlay.

== Geology ==
Pool Wall is made up of mostly gneiss rock approximately 3 million years old.

== Climbing history ==
The first free ascent of Pool Wall was made in August 2022, when climbers Alex Honnold, Hazel Findlay, Mikey Schaefer, Aldo Kane, Adam Kjeldsenlt, and Heidi Sevestre climbed the cliff.
