= Alone on the Wall =

2015 memoir by Alex Honnold and David Roberts

- Cover of extended edition released in 2018
- Author: Alex Honnold; David Roberts
- Language: English
- Genre: Memoir
- Publisher: W. W. Norton & Company
- Publication date: November 9, 2015
- Media type: Print
- Pages: 256 pp (first edition); 336 pp (extended edition)
- ISBN: 9780393247626
- Website: https://www.alexhonnold.com/aloneonthewall#book

Alone on the Wall is a 2015 memoir by Alex Honnold and David Roberts, covering Honnold's rise to fame as a rock climber, particularly his free solo climbs of big walls, and his environmental activism. In 2018, an extended edition was published, with additional chapters written by Honnold about his June 2017 free solo climb of El Capitan, which was called "the greatest feat of pure rock climbing in the history of the sport" by National Geographic. The book was praised by reviewers for its descriptions of climbing and dual-voice structure.

== Contents ==
Half the book is written by Honnold (his sections are denoted in italics), recollecting his climbs along with his old logbook notes. The other half is written by David Roberts, an accomplished climber and author, who offers commentary on Honnold's life and achievements, background for his most significant climbs, and notes from interviews with Honnold's family and climbing partners.

The book starts with Honnold's free solo climb of Moonlight Buttress, a 1,200-foot sandstone cliff in Zion National Park, on April 1, 2008. At the time, Honnold was 22 years old and unknown outside the climbing community. Later that year, he free soloed the Regular Northwest Face of Half Dome, a 2,000-foot wall in Yosemite Valley. These two solo climbs, both unprecedented, launched him to wider fame; a film covering his Half Dome achievement (also titled Alone on the Wall) and a 60 Minutes interview were released shortly after.

As Honnold became more famous, he gained opportunities to climb in more remote locations, such as Mount Kinabalu in Borneo or the Ennedi Plateau in Chad, and to collaborate with notable mountaineers including Conrad Anker and Mark Synnott. Honnold continued to attempt ambitious projects in Yosemite, such as setting the speed record on the Nose route of El Capitan with Hans Florine and completing the "Yosemite Triple Crown"—free climbing El Capitan, Half Dome, and Mount Watkins with Tommy Caldwell in under 24 hours. Honnold and Caldwell also completed the first full traverse of the Fitz Roy range in Patagonia in 2014.

Throughout the book, Honnold also discusses climate change and his desire to reduce carbon emissions by avoiding unnecessary travel. After gaining sponsorships and more income, he created The Honnold Foundation to help expand solar energy projects around the world.

== Background and release ==
Roberts first approached Honnold about writing a book in 2010, following his free solos of Moonlight Buttress and Half Dome, after Roberts interviewed Honnold for a profile in Outside magazine. Honnold turned him down, saying "I haven't done anything yet." In 2014, the two agreed to collaborate on a book, meeting at a Wyoming climbing festival in July for a series of interview sessions. Honnold was a prior fan of Roberts, having read his climbing books as a child.

The book was released on November 9, 2015. Honnold promoted the book through a month-long book tour of 20 cities, compressing a typical tour schedule as he refused to spend more than a month away from climbing. In an interview, Honnold stated a goal of the book was to document his climbs and expeditions outside of free soloing, and "seem slightly more normal to people".

== Reception ==
Alone on the Wall received generally positive reviews; Kirkus Reviews called it "an inspiringly intense memoir." Critics praised the book's climbing sequences—Gripped magazine wrote that "the vivid descriptions captured by Honnold and Roberts will surely cover the book's pages in a fine layer of palm sweat"—and its dual-voice structure, with UK Climbing noting that "Roberts' commentary is what holds the book together" while the glimpses into Honnold's mind were "the most fascinating aspect." Barbara J. King, writing for NPR, praised the book's environmental message and Honnold's approach to philanthropy.

Nathaniel Rich, writing for The Atlantic, gave a more critical review, noting that while Honnold describes his climbs in "meticulous, technical detail," he resists the introspection typical of memoir. Rich observes that elite athletes often cannot articulate their own qualities, calling the book "a celebration of nonthinking" and arguing that Honnold's nonchalance and lack of reflection while discussing his greatest achievements are directly connected to his success as a free soloist.
