= El Sendero Luminoso =

Big wall climbing route in El Potrero Chico, Mexico

- El Toro
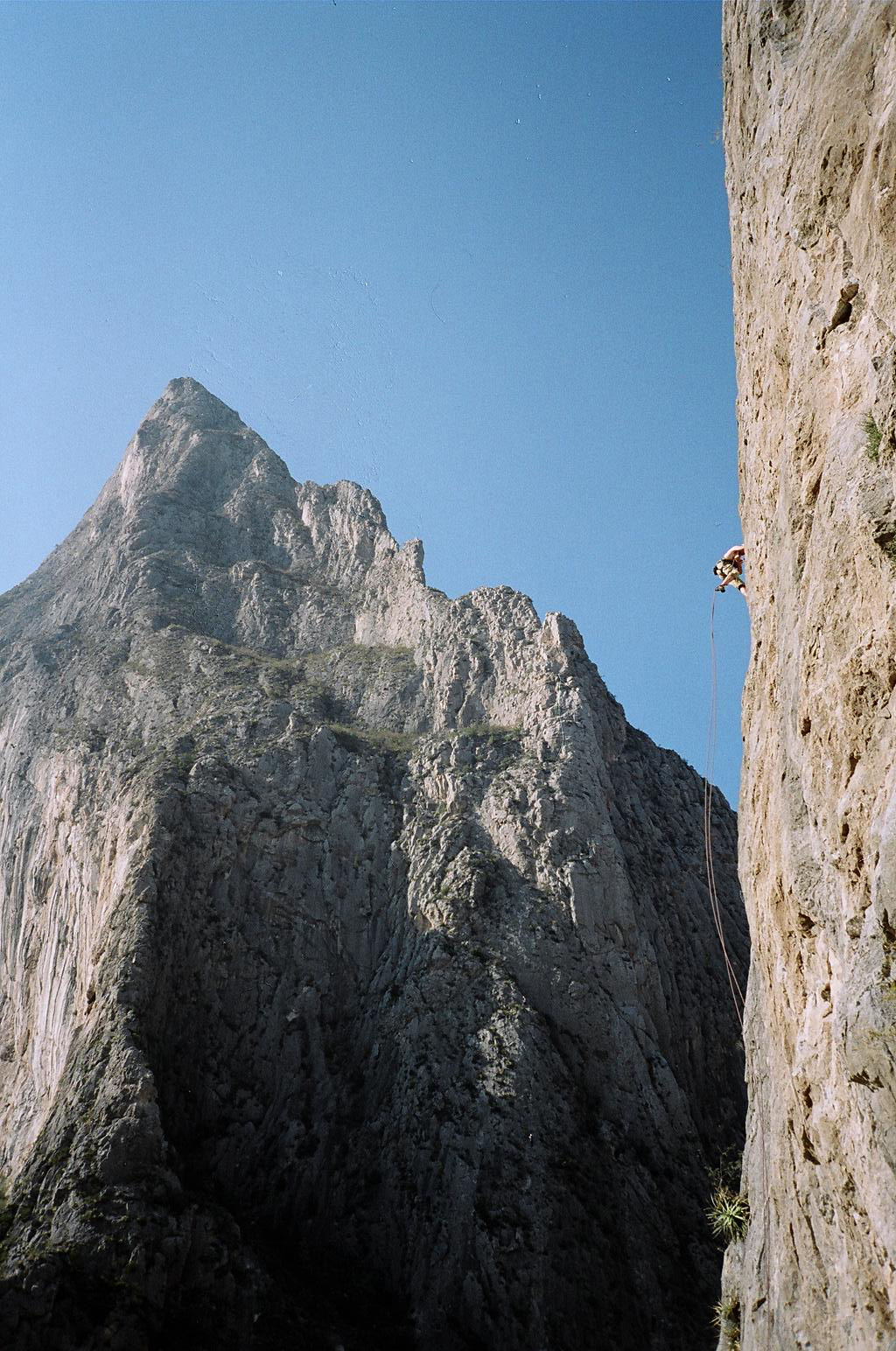
- El Toro as seen from Mota Wall. El Sendero Luminoso (5.12+) rises from the base of the mountain on the far right side of the image.
- Location: Nuevo León, Mexico
- Coordinates: 25.949°N 100.477°W
- Climbing area: El Potrero Chico
- Route type: Big wall climbing; Sport climbing
- Vertical gain: 1,500-foot (460 m)
- Pitches: 15
- Technical grade: 5.12+ (7b+/7c)
- NCCS grade: V
- First free ascent: Jeff Jackson, Kurt Smith and Pete Peacock
- First free solo ascent: Alex Honnold, January 2014

El Sendero Luminoso (also, El Toro), is a circa 1,500-foot (460 m) big wall climbing bolted sport-climbing route at El Potrero Chico, Nuevo León, Mexico that rises over 1500 ft (~450 m) up the front side of El Toro mountain.

El Sendero Luminoso is one of the hardest big wall routes in the area and 11 of its 15 pitches are graded at over 5.12 (7b/+). The route was established by Jeff Jackson, Kurt Smith, and Pete Peacock and is graded 5.12+ V overall.

On January 15, 2014, Alex Honnold became the first person to free solo the route, taking just over three hours.

On November 27, 2019, the American rock climber Brad Gobright fell approximately 300 meters to his death while descending from the route with his climbing partner, Aidan Jacobson, who fell between 20 and 30 meters but survived.
