= Ammon McNeely =

American rock climber (1970–2023)

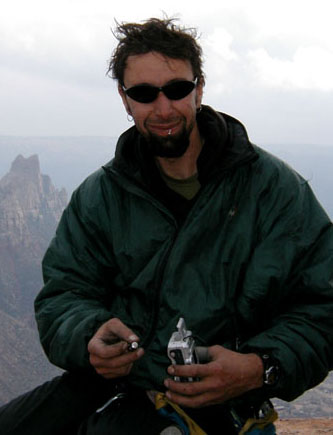
- McNeely in 2003

Personal information
- Born: June 3, 1970 Provo, Utah, U.S.
- Died: February 18, 2023 (aged 52) Moab, Utah, U.S.

Climbing career
- Type of climber: Big wall climbing; Aid climbing; Speed climbing
- Known for: Speed climbing on El Capitan
- Updated on 19 February 2023

Ammon McNeely (June 3, 1970 – February 18, 2023) was an American rock climber who specialized in big wall climbing and aid climbing, and who set many speed climbing records and made the first "one-day ascent" for many climbing routes on El Capitan in Yosemite. His other interests included BASE jumping and wingsuiting. McNeely was also a slackliner and pioneered many highlines throughout the US.

== Climbing career ==
=== El Capitan ascents ===
McNeely completed many one-day (i.e. under 24 hours) big wall aid climbing routes on El Capitan including Eric Kohl's Plastic Surgery Disaster (VI 5.8 A5), Warren Harding's Wall of the Early Morning Light (VI 5.9 A2+), John Middendorf's Atlantic Ocean Wall (VI 5.8 A4), and one of the hardest aid climbing routes on El Capitan, The Reticent Wall (VI 5.7 A5), along with Dean Potter & Ivo Ninov in 34 hours and 57 minutes.

McNeely was considered to have completed some of the broadest range of aid and free climbing routes on El Capitan (up to 75 times via 61 different routes).

McNeely was the first (along with Nate Brown) to have climbed all three routes on The Streaked Wall in Zion National Park; he climbed all three routes as a "first one-day ascent".

In 2011, 29 years after the first ascent, McNeely with partner Kait Barber made the second ascent of the aid climbing route Wings of Steel, with the purpose of examining the controversial methods of the first ascent team; their climb was documented in the 2013 Jeff Vargen-directed film, Assault on El Capitan

=== El Capitan speed records ===
Some of McNeely's other El Capitan speed climbing records include:

- Lost World: 23:29 - with Ivo Ninov July 7, 2009 (First One Day Ascent)
- Never Never Land: 16:00:02 - with Chris McNamara - August 4, 2004 (First One Day Ascent)
- Horse Chute: 20:39 - with Chris McNamara - Oct 8, 2004 (First One Day Ascent)
- Magic Mushroom: 55:15 - with Ivo Ninov & Kevin Jaramillo - July 4-6th, 2005
- The Reticent Wall: 34:57 - with Dean Potter & Ivo Ninov - July 12–13, 2006
- Wall of Early Morning Light: 23:43 - with Brian McCray - September 2004 (First One Day Ascent)
- Pacific Ocean Wall: 33:02 - with Ivo Ninov - May, 2004
- New Jersey Turnpike: 14:00:02 - with Brian McCray - September, 2002
- Atlantic Ocean Wall: 23:38 - with Brian McCray - August 4, 2004 (First One Day Ascent)
- Native Son: 23:53 - with Ivo Ninov - May 15, 2006 (First One Day Ascent)
- Iron Hawk: 30:42 - with Cedar Wright - May, 2004
- Scorched Earth: 22:28 - with Skiy Detray & David Allfrey
- Tangerine Trip: 10:24 - with Cedar Wright - July, 2002
- Virginia: 17:24 - with Gabriel McNeely & Ivo Ninov - July 16, 2005
- Lost in America: 18:04 - with Brian McCray - August, 2004
- Zenyatta Mondatta: 22:56 - with Ivo Nivov & Kevin Jaramillo - June 27, 2005 (First One Day Ascent)
- Plastic Surgery Disaster: 21:37 - with Brian McCray - June, 2001 (First One Day Ascent)
- Lunar Eclipse: 19:58 - with Jose Pererya & Chongo - June, 2001
- Born Under a Bad Sign: 22:22 - with Chris Van Luevan & Eric Walden - October 2, 2001 (First One Day Ascent)
- Eagle's Way: 9:08 - with Brian McCray - August, 2004
- On the Waterfront: 17:07 - with Skiy Detray & Ammon McNeely - July 15, 2009 (First One Day Ascent - 3rd overall Ascent)
- Pressure Cooker: 23:41 - with Ivo Ninov - September, 2004 (First One Day Ascent)
- Get Whacked: 12:49 - with Brian McCray - June, 2001 (First One Day Ascent)

== BASE jumping activities ==
In October 2013, Ammon nearly lost his foot in a BASE accident in Moab that he described: "We were with one other jumper who was new, and I voted that Andy goes first, the two new guys go in the middle, and I go last. They had perfect exits, and great openings with no wind. I jumped, probably took a tad longer delay than I should have, being it was a new exit with new brake lines, and immediately had a 180-degree opening. I struck the cliff with my left foot and continued rag-dolling down the cliff where I finally came to rest on a sloping ledge. I knew I was banged up, but to my utter surprise my foot was flipped on its side looking very similar to a Nalgene bottle with just a sliver of skin keeping it on."

In October 2017, Ammon lost his right leg below the knee in a BASE accident in Moab.

== Death ==
On February 18, 2023, Ammon was with his girlfriend, enjoying the sunset near Moab, Utah. As Ammon was trying to sit down, he lost his footing under his prosthetic leg and fell backward off the cliff. He was 52.

== See also ==
- Jim Bridwell, American big wall aid climbing pioneer
