= John Fry (journalist) =

American journalist (1930–2020)

John Fry (January 22, 1930 – January 24, 2020) invented the Nations Cup of alpine ski racing by which the relative strengths of the world's national ski teams are ranked annually. Fry created Nastar (National Standard Ski Race), a system for recreational skiers to experience the thrill of racing, in use at more than a hundred U.S. ski areas. He worked as a journalist and as chief editor of large-circulation magazines devoted to skiing, golf, and outdoor recreation and travel. He served as editor-in-chief of SKI Magazine and founding editor of Snow Country Magazine. He wrote more than 300 published articles and opinion columns about skiing. He is the author of the award-winning Story of Modern Skiing, about the revolutions in the sport that happened after World War II. He was Chairman of the International Skiing History Association, publisher of Skiing History Magazine.

== Early life ==
Born January 22, 1930 in Montreal, PQ, Canada, Fry first donned skis at age six. After a few years, he was able to ride the world’s first rope tow, which had been built at Shawbridge, Quebec in 1932.

Fry attended Lower Canada College, graduating in 1947, and then McGill University, where he raced for the Red Birds Ski Club. He earned a bachelor of arts degree in 1951.

== Magazine publishing career ==
After graduating from McGill University, Fry worked in public relations and custom publishing from 1952 to 1957. He emigrated to New York City in 1957 when he joined the daily trade paper American Metal Market, where he became managing editor. In 1960 he was named AMM’s managing editor. He spent time in London interviewing key traders on the London Metal Exchange. In 1961, he toured northern Europe reporting on the post-war recovery of the metal industry in Germany, on the four-year-old European Common Market organization in Brussels, and the Steel Committee of the Economic Commission for Europe in Geneva. Fry wrote numerous editorials on economics and politics affecting the metal industries. Separately, as a freelancer, he served as contributing editor of Ski Life, a national magazine launched in 1959, soon to be merged with SKI Magazine. In 1963 he joined the staff of SKI as executive editor, and editor of its sister publication Ski Business. In 1964 he was named editor-in-chief of SKI, and in 1969 became editorial director of SKI and Golf Magazines, both published by Universal Publishing & Distributing Co. After the Times Mirror Company acquired the titles in 1972, he served as Editorial Director of Outdoor Life, SKI and Golf Magazine, with circulations ranging from 350,000 to 1.8 million. During this period, he created two new publications: Action Vacations and Cross-Country Ski.

In 1968, when editor-in-chief of SKI Magazine, he originated the National Standard Race (NASTAR), similar to par in golf, affording tens of thousands of skiers the opportunity to race at as many as 135 ski areas. NASTAR is now owned and operated by the U.S.Ski & Snowboard Association. In 1967 he created the Nations Cup, a way annually to rank the national teams competing in the World Cup of alpine skiing. As SKI's editor-in-chief, he was instrumental in initiating the Graduated Length Method (GLM) of ski instruction, by which novices were taught to ski on a progression from short to long skis.

From 1984 to 1988 Fry worked independently as a consultant. He was an early user of computer word processing, enabling freelancers to operate from their homes. He wrote a column on editing for Folio, the magazine of magazine management. He worked on the startup of European Travel & Life Magazine, and of Golf Course Living, and served as editorial consultant for Environmental Nutrition. In the summer of 1987, the New York Times Co. retained Fry as an editorial consultant to create the content and design of a new magazine, Snow Country, aimed at skiers and visitors to the mountains. Following publication of the premier issue in January 1988, he became the full-time editor-in-chief. Snow Country, which attained a circulation of 450,000, was named by the Acres of Diamonds Awards in 1991 as one of America's best new magazines. The magazine, acquired by another publisher in 1999, ceased publication in 2000. In 1996, the New York Times Sports/Leisure Group appointed Fry as Editor of New Magazine Development. In this role, he started Golf Course Living Magazine. He retired from the New York Times Co. in 1999. As Editor of Snow Country and an elected director of the Pinchot Institute for Conservation, he helped to initiate two national conferences on the environmental impact of the rapid growth in mountain living. At the same time, he devised the idea of measuring the economics and demographics of counties containing the majority of U.S. ski resorts.

From 1999 to 2011 Fry returned to SKI Magazine as a contributing editor, and he remains an active member of the editorial board at Skiing History magazine.

A dedicated gardener, Fry designed a hillside garden at his passive solar home in Katonah, featuring sculptural works of his daughter Leslie, featured in the June 15, 2011 edition of the New York Times. The following year, he staged in the Katonah Library a show of his photography, "Near and There", an assemblage of photographs he made over the years at or near his home, each one paired with an image garnered from his travels around the world. In December 2020, he had another photography exhibition at the Katonah Library, titled "Near" – all beautiful sights within a short walk from the library.

== Books ==
- No Hill Too Fast, with Phil and Steve Mahre, Simon & Schuster, New York, 1985. Biography of the Olympic and World Cup champions.
- The Story of Modern Skiing, University Press of New England, 2006.
- A Mind at Sea, Henry Fry and the glorious era of Quebec-built giant sailing ships. Dundurn Press, Toronto, 2013.
- Abandon Foolish Scheme, published posthumously (copyright Leslie Fry, the author's daughter), 2020. Memoir and essays on death and dying.
- America's Ski Book, Revised Edition. Charles Scribner's Sons, New York,1973.

== Boards of Directors ==
- Chairman, International Skiing History Association (ISHA), 2014–2020
- President, ISHA, 2001–2004, 2011–2014
- Director, Pinchot Institute for Conservation, 1994–1999.
- Director, Riverkeeper, 1992–2000.
- Director, Beaver Dam Sanctuary, 1995–2020

== Articles published ==
Beginning in 1954 wrote more than 300 published articles and columns for SKI, Snow Country and Skiing History (formerly Skiing Heritage) magazines, as well as for Sport Magazine, the New York Times, Ski Business, Ski Area Management, and other periodicals.

== Articles on Sir Arnold Lunn ==
- The Priest Won, Commonweal Magazine, June 5, 2009.
- Up and Down the Holy Mountains, The Tablet, December 2009.
- Race of the Unbroken, Backcountry Magazine, 2012.

== Awards ==
- Elected to the U.S. National Ski Hall of Fame, 1995, one of only two people to solo into the Hall since its founding in 1954.
- Recipient of the North American SnowSports Journalists Golden Quill Award for contributions to the advancement of skiing.
- Lifetime Achievement Award of the International Skiing History Association.
- Federation Internationale de Ski (FIS) Journalism Award, 1997.
- Laurentian Ski Hall of Fame (Temple de la Renomee du Ski des Laurentides) 2016.
- Canadian Ski Hall of Fame 2018

== Personal life ==
Fry married Ann Lyons in 1952. They divorced in 1958. Their two children are Leslie Stevenson Fry and William Lyons Fry. He married Marlies Strillinger in 1965. They have a daughter, Nicole Maria Fry.

Fry died peacefully, of a heart attack, two days after his 90th birthday, while floating off a beach on Vieques Island, Puerto Rico.
