= Poop Map =

Social media app

- Developer: Nino Uzelac
- Release: July 2013
- Stable release: Version 5.0.0 / September 11, 2024
- Size: 72.6 MB
- Website: https://www.poopmap.net/

Poop Map is a social app where users can track on a map where and when they defecate. In addition to logging location and time of each bowel movement, users can also add a photo, "like" other users' logs, and rate each account. The social elements of the app allow for groups of users to create a competitive league. Certain behaviors unlock achievements in-app.

== Development ==
The app was created by app developer Nino Uzelac. It was launched in July 2013.

== Popularity ==
The app charted at number one on the Apple App Store charts in 2021 after going viral on TikTok. As of September 2024, the app has a 4.8 rating on the App Store and more than 58,000 ratings. It also has more than one million downloads on the Google Play Store.

Poop Map is notably popular among hikers, and has been written about in the outdoors magazine Outside.
