= Brad Gobright =

American rock climber (1988–2019)

Personal information
- Born: June 16, 1988 Orange County, California, U.S.
- Died: November 27, 2019 (aged 31) El Sendero Luminoso in El Potrero Chico, Nuevo León, Mexico
- Occupation: Rock climber

Climbing career
- Type of climber: Big wall climbing, Free soloing
- Highest grade: Bouldering: V10 (7C+)

Brad Gobright (June 16, 1988 – November 27, 2019) was an American rock climber known for free solo climbing.

== Early life ==
Gobright was born in Orange County, California, and began climbing when he was six. He dropped out of college in 2009, working odd jobs during winter and climbing during the rest of the year.

== Climbing career ==
Gobright and Mason Earle made the first free ascent of The Heart Route on El Capitan in Yosemite National Park in 2015. In 2016, he and Scott Bennett climbed three routes on El Capitan in 24 hours – Zodiac, The Nose and Lurking Fear. In 2017, he and Jim Reynolds set a speed record of two hours 19 minutes and 44 seconds for The Nose on El Capitan. With Alex Honnold in June 2019, he made the second free ascent of El Niño on El Capitan in fourteen-and-a-half hours.

== Death ==
On November 27, 2019, Gobright fell about 300 meters (980 ft) to his death on the El Sendero Luminoso climb at El Potrero Chico in Nuevo León, Mexico. The accident happened while simul-rappelling down the face of El Sendero Luminoso with his partner Aidan Jacobson, after the pair had completed a quick climb of the face. Jacobson fell a shorter distance and survived with injuries.

== Filmography ==
- Safety Third (2017) – A segment in Sender Films' Reel Rock 12, the 27-minute documentary shows Gobright's bold trad and free solo climbs including his free solo ascent of Hairstyles and Attitudes (5.12b/c) on the Bastille, Eldorado Canyon, Colorado.
- Two Nineteen Forty-Four (2017) – The 8-minute film shows Brad Gobright and Jim Reynolds's October 2017 speed record of two hours, 19 minutes, and 44 seconds on The Nose, a route up El Capitan in Yosemite, California.
- The Nose Speed Record'' (2019) – Featured in Reel Rock 14, the 63-minute documentary features Alex Honnold and Tommy Caldwell's successful effort to beat Brad Gobright and Jim Reynolds's speed record on The Nose of El Capitan. Brad Gobright and Jim Reynolds's previous speed record was two hours, 19 minutes, and 44 seconds. The new speed record set by Honnold and Caldwell was 1 hour, 58 minutes, and 7 seconds. The documentary shows footage of both teams' climbs and the friendly rivalry between them.

== Selected notable climbs ==
- 2015, The Heart Route (VI 5.13b) El Capitan, Yosemite, US – First free ascent by Brad Gobright and Mason Earle on June 19, 2015.
- 2015, Hairstyles and Attitudes (5.12c) in Eldorado Canyon, Colorado, US – First free solo ascent by Brad Gobright in November 2015.
- 2017, The Nose (VI 5.8 A2) El Capitan, Yosemite, US – Former speed record of two hours, 19 minutes, and 44 seconds set by Brad Gobright and Jim Reynolds in October 2017.
- 2019, Golden Gate (VI 5.13), Muir Wall via The Shaft, El Nino via Pineapple Express, El Capitan, Yosemite, US – Brad Gobright has sent Golden Gate VI 5.13a in a 16.5 hour push for his third free route on El Cap this season in a day. Earlier this spring, Gobright sent Muir Wall via The Shaft and El Nino via Pineapple Express.
