= NASTAR =

Ski and snowboard race

National Standard Race (abbreviated NASTAR) is the world's largest recreational ski and snowboard race program. It was founded in 1968 by SKI magazine and is owned and operated by Outside Inc.

NASTAR has a scoring system for assigning scores to ski and snowboard racers of all ages and abilities, using a handicap system. Since the program's beginning in 1968, more than 6 million NASTAR racer-days have been recorded. It has been available at more than 100 ski resorts in North America and 1 in Australia. Many U.S. Ski Team stars got their start by racing in NASTAR programs.

== History ==
NASTAR uses the principle of time percentages to calibrate a skier's ability, a concept pioneered by France's Ecole de Ski Nationale Chamois program. For certification, a ski instructor had to perform well enough in the Ecole's annual Challenge to earn a silver medal and be less than 25 percent behind the time recorded by the fastest instructor. The Chamois was a regular slalom race course with hairpins and flushes. A certified instructor, back in his home area, could set the pace for local participants in Chamois races. His time was not recalibrated or sped up, as in NASTAR, by the amount he lagged behind the winning time in the annual Challenge. The NASTAR idea of adjusting a local pacesetter's time to a national standard was introduced in France 20 years later, in the winter of 1987–88. SNMSF (Syndicat National des Moniteurs de Ski Francais) introduced Fleche, an open-gated giant slalom, during the same winter that NASTAR began, though unknown to NASTAR's founder. Paul Chalvin, former Director of the SNMSF.

John Fry, who became editor-in-chief of SKI magazine in 1964, adapted this percentage-of-time system to a program for recreational ski racing in the United States, calling it the 'National Standard Race'. Fry, who in 1969 became editorial director of Golf Magazine as well as SKI, was driven by the idea of creating in skiing the equivalent of par in golf. The program, to which Fry applied the acronym NASTAR, was introduced in 1968 as a means to compare the performance of recreational ski racers at resorts. These resorts were located across the United States, and later, for a time, in Australia, Canada, Scandinavia, Switzerland, and Italy. NASTAR courses are simple, open-gated giant slaloms on mostly intermediate terrain, allowing skiers of all abilities and ages to experience racing. Just as in golf's handicap system, skiers can compare their times and compete with one another regardless of where and when they compete. It takes into account varying terrain and snow conditions. The program started with 8 participating resorts and 2,297 skiers in the first year and quickly gained popularity under the powerful direction of former U.S. Ski Team coach and pro skiing impresario Bob Beattie. The program grew to more than 100 resorts and 6 million skiers and snowboarders participating by 2006. Additionally, NASTAR went through several national sponsors, the latest being Nature Valley.

== Handicap system ==
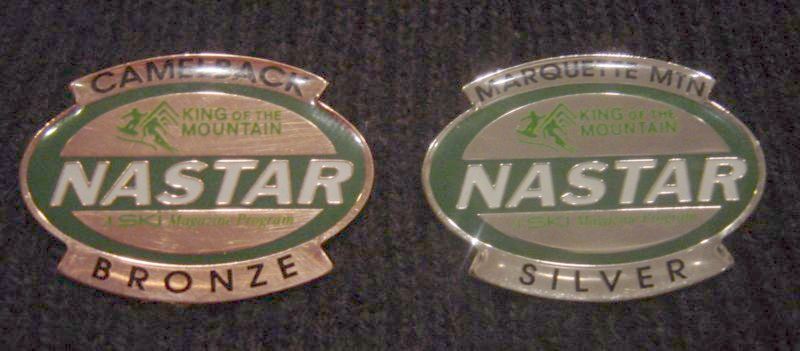
Sample NASTAR bronze and silver medals, from Camelback Mountain Resort and Marquette Mountain ski resorts

The National Standard is the Par Time or the "0" handicap, which every racer competes against when they race NASTAR. The "0" handicap is typically set by a U.S. Ski Team racer or former champion. Runners-up establish handicaps against the winner based on their lag time percentage. These 'traveling pacesetters' compete against pacesetters from each NASTAR resort at sanctioned Regional Pacesetting Trials before the start of the following season. These events enable pacesetters from each individual resort to establish their own certified handicap against the national champion's Par Time or "0" handicap. The resort pacesetters use their certified handicap to set the Par Time at their local NASTAR course each racing day, and in turn, give each participant who races at their resort a handicap that is referenced to the national champion. The Par Time is approximately the time the national NASTAR champion would have raced the course had he been there that day. Various allowances are then made for age group, gender, disability, snowboarders, etc. Every skier, regardless of ability or disability, can ski with a time referenced against the national champion, corrected for the specific resort and course conditions and their level. Platinum, Gold, Silver, and Bronze designations are based on performance in several races, relative to each racer's age, gender, and ability group. Championships are held near the end of the skiing season each year.

== Standard NASTAR course ==
NASTAR resorts possess the autonomy to determine the location and configuration of their NASTAR race venue, typically favoring visibility from high-traffic areas such as lifts or lodges. The resort retains discretion in choosing between single or dual courses. Each NASTAR course is essentially a modified Giant Slalom (GS) course comprising 12 to 20 gates for racers to navigate. Gates are positioned with vertical distances of 18 to 20 meters between them and horizontal offsets ranging from 4 to 8 meters. Resorts are advised to establish a standardized course(s) with a target time of 23 seconds, ensuring that no course falls within 5% of the set time. The 'cap time,' representing the fastest possible time down the venue achieved by the local pacesetter without maneuvering around gates, serves as a benchmark. While the appearance of each race venue may vary, the aforementioned criteria, particularly the consistent par time established by the pacesetter, contribute to result standardization. This uniformity facilitates participants in comparing race times regardless of the location or timing of their races.

== NASTAR database ==
NASTAR requires all participants to register, which is a process that can be completed online from home via its website. Upon registration, each racer is required to pay an entry fee per race. The races are timed electronically using a mechanical lever for the clock start and an optical beam sensor for the clock stop. The race results are saved on a computer and uploaded by the resort to the central NASTAR database each race day. Once the data is on the central database (usually by the end of a race day), it becomes publicly accessible, and racers can view their performance history from different dates and resorts at any time.

== Resort participation ==
Every ski resort in North America is encouraged to participate in the NASTAR program. The NASTAR organization sends out presentations and questionnaires to all resorts in the off-season to determine the resorts eligible for participation during the coming season. Participating resorts then receive a NASTAR kit and instructions that allow them to upload daily race data into the central NASTAR database. They also must have certified NASTAR pacesetters that can perform a pacesetting run on the designated course each racing day, to calibrate the handicap for the course conditions on that day.

== National Championship ==
=== Alpine Division skiers ===
Prior to the end of the season, the top three Alpine Division performers of each resort in each of the 4 medal divisions (Platinum, Gold, Silver, and Bronze) are invited to compete in the National Championship. Those who choose to participate compete against others in their respective category. Each racer is assigned a division in his or her appropriate gender and age group for the national race to 'level the playing field'. After the competition, for each gender and age group, the fastest 3 racers are awarded Gold, Silver, and bronze medals. Gold medal winners then compete in a final "Race of Champions" competition to determine the overall champion based on handicapped time, along with the fastest 3 racers based on 'raw' time, qualifying them.

=== Non-Alpine Division skiers ===
The non-Alpine Divisions (for the purposes of NASTAR championship racing classification) are Telemark, Physically Challenged, and Snowboarders. For each division, the top 100 performers during the season in their respective age and gender group are invited to compete in the National Championship. After the competition, Gold, Silver, and bronze medals are awarded to the fastest 3 racers by handicap in each division, gender, and age group.

=== Participation ===
The National NASTAR Championship brings together over one thousand participants from the United States and Canada, of all ages and ability groups. The 2006 Championship was held in Steamboat Springs and included 1,337 racers of ages 3 to 86, from 44 US states and Canada.

== NASTAR as a ski instructor qualification ==
Traditionally, ski instructor certification was based more on subjective assessment of form and technique rather than objective clock-based performance. Lately, this has been changing as a result of the wide availability and growing popularity of NASTAR.

On August 8, 2004, the Rocky Mountain Division of the Professional Ski Instructors of America (PSIA) voted to allow a NASTAR gold medal (equivalent to a racing time within 16% of the national US champion for a male in his 20s) as one of the prerequisites for future certification of a Level 3 Ski Instructor. The Rocky Mountain Division of the PSIA includes the biggest ski resorts in the US, such as Vail, Aspen, Steamboat, and Taos, and has 6,000 members, half of whom are certified as Level 3, the highest rating for an instructor.

== See also ==
- Alpine skiing
- Giant slalom skiing
