= Rock & Ice =

American climbing magazine

Rock & Ice is a magazine published by Outside focusing on rock climbing and on ice climbing. The first issue came out in March 1984. The first publisher was Neal Kaptain. George Bracksieck worked for him, beginning in January 1984, and the two became equal partners in September of that year.

The magazine was bought out within the first year by George Bracksieck, who remained publisher and editor until the end of December 1997. His company, Eldorado Publishing, sold Rock & Ice to North-South Publications, an investment group led by Dougald MacDonald. After a few years, it was sold to Big Stone. The magazine is published eight times a year. It was headquartered in Boulder, Colorado until 2002, when it moved to Carbondale, Colorado. Rock & Ice was purchased by, Pocket Outdoor Media, the owners of Outside in 2021, and they merged it with Climbing.

The cover of the first issue featured Alex Lowe climbing the first ascent of The Fang in Vail, Colorado.

== See also ==
- Alpinist magazine
- Summit magazine
- Climbing magazine
