= Will Stanhope =

Canadian rock climber and guide (1986–2026)

Personal information
- Born: November 16, 1986
- Died: April 23, 2026 (aged 39) British Columbia, Canada
- Occupation: Rock climber

Climbing career
- Type of climber: Free solo climbing; Traditional climbing; Big wall climbing; Alpine climbing
- Highest grade: Redpoint: 5.14 (8c/+); Free solo: 5.12 (7b/+)
- First ascents: The Tom Egan Memorial Route (5.14)

William Joseph Stanhope (16 November 1986 – 23 April 2026) was a Canadian rock climber and professional rock-climbing guide. He was known for establishing first free ascents (FFAs) on difficult traditional climbing routes. Stanhope died in a 2026 climbing accident.

== Life and career ==
Stanhope was born in 1986, and learned to climb in a North Vancouver climbing gym from the age of nine.

At the time of his death had become known as "one of North America's leading traditional climbers" and "one of Canada's boldest climbers". In 2024, Stanhope and Tim Emmett made the FFA of a new 5.12+ (7b+/7c) graded traditional climbing route on the south ridge of Mount Combatant. Stanhope climbed with Alex Honnold, who said about him, "he likes scary trad routes ... He's just a real climbing dude, the kind you want to have sitting around the campfire."

Stanhope was also known for free solo climbing at climbing grades up to 5.12 (7b/+). In an interview, he stated that he would free solo routes early in the morning before beginning work as a mountain guide. Stanhope said that he avoided free soloing routes at the limit of his ability and he would climb up only if he thought he could climb down.

Besides free solo climbing, Stanhope was also known for FFAs of difficult alpine climbing and big wall climbing routes. In 2015, he made the FFA of a 5.14 (8c/+) graded traditional climbing route called The Tom Egan Memorial Route on Snowpatch Spire in the Bugaboos, considered one of the most difficult multi-pitch rock climbs in Canada. Stanhope and his partner, Matt Segal, spent 100 days over four years working on the climb. Their ascent was made into a climbing film, Boys in the Bugs. Despite multiple attempts, the route was never repeated and was wiped out in a 2022 rockfall event.

He worked as an Association of Canadian Mountain Guides certified guide. Stanhope published stories about his adventures in media such as the Canadian Alpine Journal and American Alpine Journal, and appeared in multiple climbing films.

== Death ==
On 13 April 2026, he fell from Rutabaga, a 5.11a (6b+) graded traditional climbing route on Stawamus Chief near Squamish, British Columbia. Having sustained a broken foot and skull fracture, he was transported to hospital in stable condition but died on 23 April, at the age of 39. After his death, his climbing partner said that they had pushed onwards with the climb despite encountering rain, which made the rock more slippery. He was not wearing a helmet when he fell. She estimated the fall to be at most 10 metres (33 ft), contrary to reports from SAR that he fell around 20 metres (70 ft). He was unconscious for only a brief period of time before she began to lower him. Although she told rescuers that a helicopter evacuation was necessary due to the severity of his injuries and the difficulty of the terrain to approach, it took over four hours for him to be transported to a hospital where he underwent emergency brain surgery.

At the time of his death, Stanhope was facing trial on nine criminal charges, including breaking and entering and sexual assault, for offenses allegedly committed between November 2024 and November 2025. Although he was not intoxicated at the time of his death, he had been to rehab multiple times for alcohol addiction. Some of his friends were concerned about his increasing alcohol use and mental health challenges, possibly exacerbated by the death of some of his close friends, including Hayden Kennedy, Marc-André Leclerc, and Michael Gardner.
