= Skyscraper Live (2026 film) =

Television special

- Showrunner: Al Berman
- Presented by: Elle Duncan, Seth Rollins, Emily Harrington, Pete Woods, Mark Rober
- Starring: Alex Honnold
- Country of origin: United States
- Original language: English

Production
- Executive producer: James Smith
- Production locations: Taipei, Taiwan
- Running time: 117 minutes
- Production company: Plimsoll Productions

Original release
- Network: Netflix
- Release: January 25, 2026

Skyscraper Live is a Netflix special in which American climber Alex Honnold scaled the Taiwan skyscraper Taipei 101 without the use of ropes. The buildering ascent was broadcast live on January 25, 2026, and was hosted by sports broadcaster Elle Duncan, along with professional wrestler Seth Rollins, climber Emily Harrington, climber and climbing broadcaster Pete Woods and YouTuber Mark Rober.

Outside magazine claimed the stunt was the highest free solo climb of an urban structure, though this record is disputed with Dan Goodwin's 1986 ascent of the CN Tower.

== Background ==
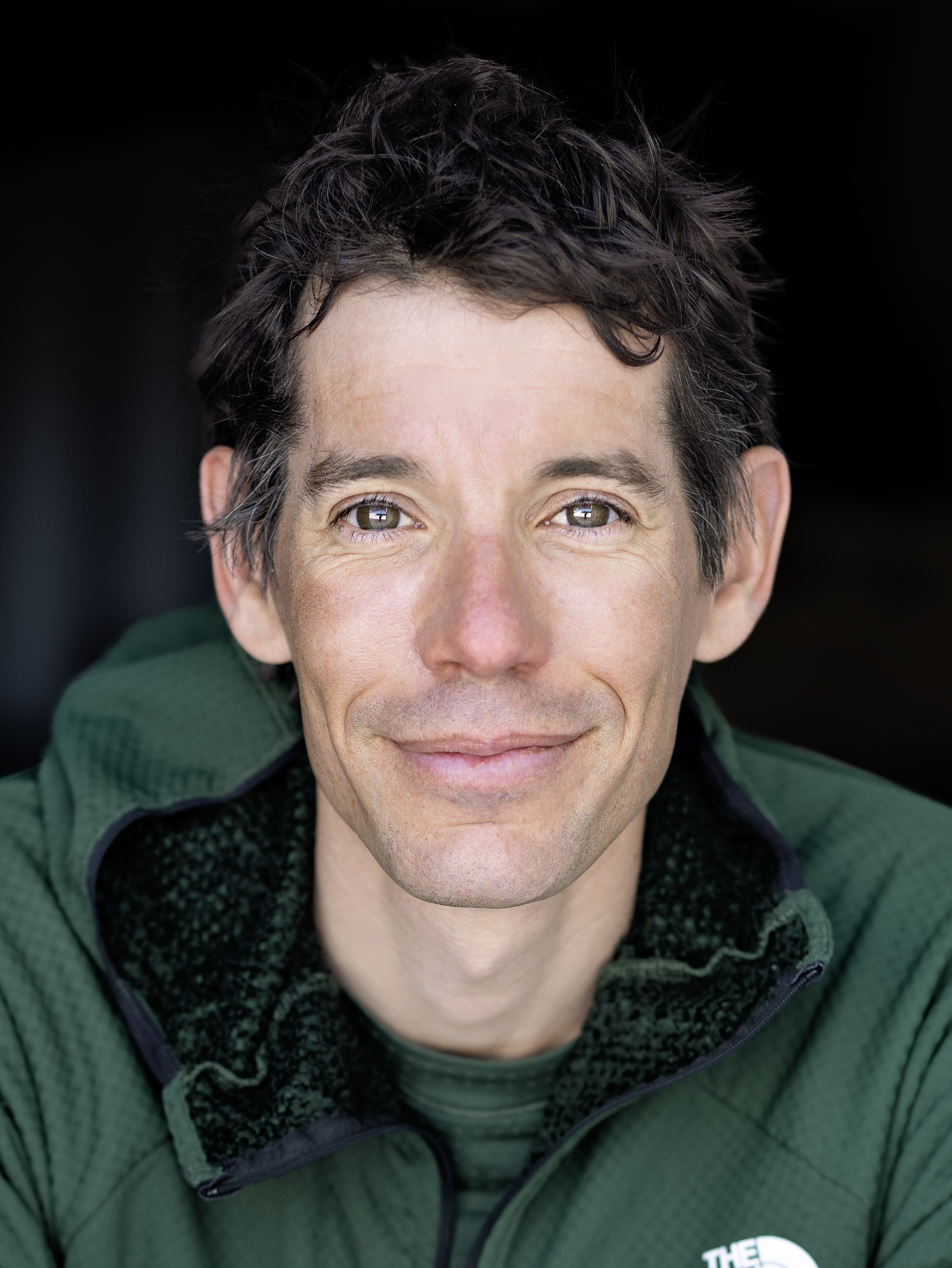
Alex Honnold in 2023

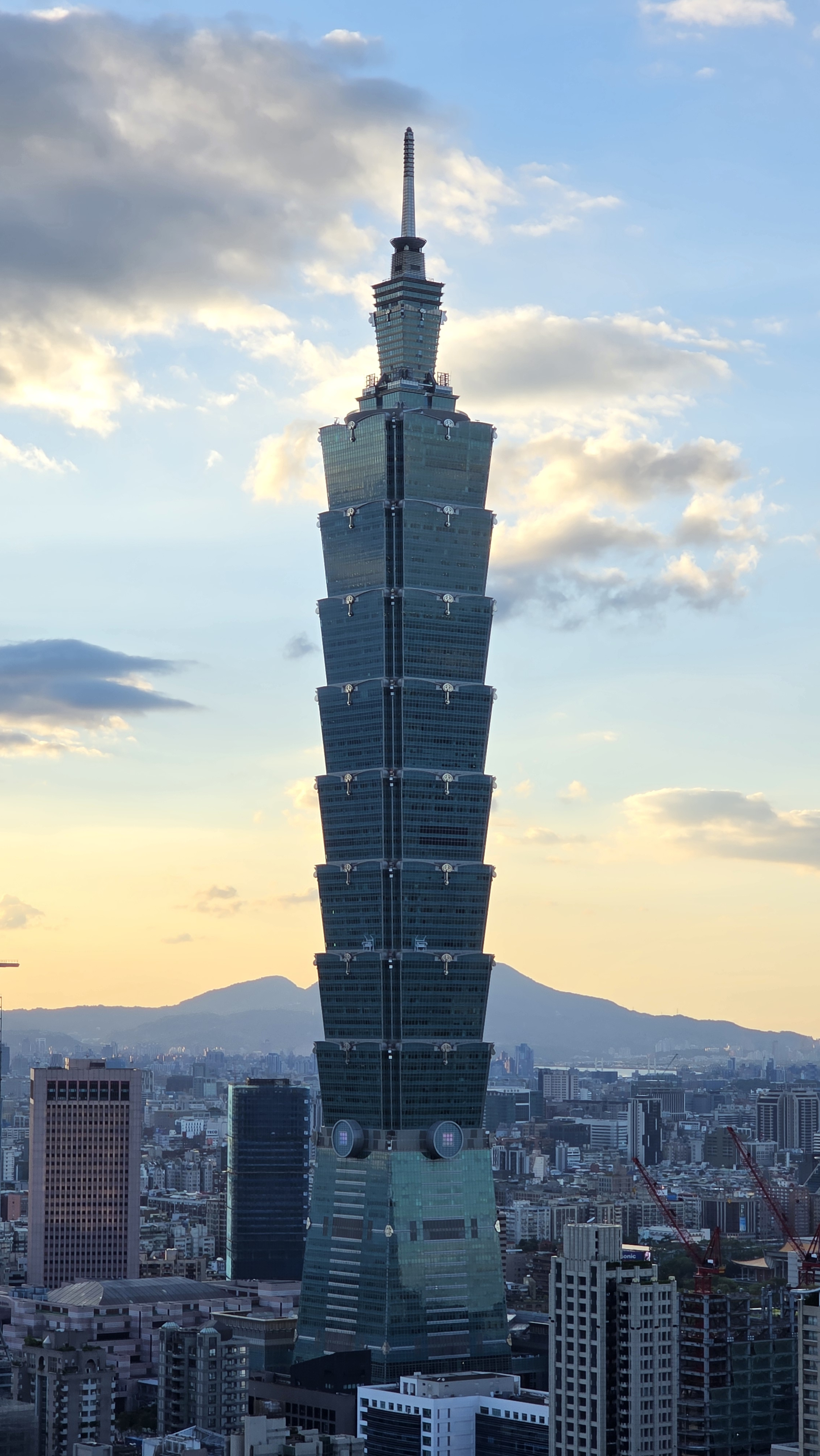
Taipei 101 in 2025

Taipei 101 is 508 meters (1,667 ft) tall and was the tallest building in the world from 2004 to 2009. As of 2026, it is the eleventh-largest skyscraper in the world and the tallest building in Taiwan. It was last climbed by Alain Robert in 2004, over the course of four hours in heavy rain and with a safety rope, meaning it was not a free solo climb. Robert, who has climbed about 200 such buildings, rates it at 6 out of 10 on his difficulty scale.

Honnold became famous in 2017 for his free solo climb of the El Capitan rock formation in Yosemite National Park, which was the subject of the Academy Award-winning documentary Free Solo. His climb of Taipei 101 was his first significant climb of a man-made structure.

Honnold was 40 years old during this buildering climb. He practiced climbing portions of the building to prepare for the live ascent, telling The New York Times that he climbed it with ropes "two or three" times. In advance of his climb, Honnold participated in a traditional Taiwanese blessing ceremony to pray for success.

In an interview in advance of the event, Honnold told Adam Skolnick of The New York Times that he would be paid "an embarrassingly small amount" for the climb, which the newspaper reported would be in the "mid-six figures". Saturday Night Live parodied the event the Saturday before it took place, with Mikey Day playing Honnold.

== Broadcast ==
The special aired live on January 25, 2026, one day later than originally scheduled due to inclement weather. Honnold began his climb at 9:00 a.m. local time and reached the top of the spire one hour and 31 minutes later. Plimsoll Productions was the lead producer. The event used "standard live-TV production safety protocols", according to People. The Taiwanese government and the Taipei Film Commission were organizers of the event.

While climbing, Honnold appeared to be relaxed, smiling and waving to onlookers inside and outside the building, and making occasional commentary through a live microphone. Though he mentioned that he was tired, he completed the ascent without incident, arriving at the top of the spire after one hour, 31 minutes, and 34 seconds. After it was complete, Honnold rappelled down to the 88th floor and exited through the interior of the building.

In addition to footage of Honnold climbing, the broadcast included live commentary from the panel of hosts and clips of Honnold training and spending time with his family. Netflix broadcast the climb on a 10-second delay so that, in the case of Honnold falling, the broadcast could be stopped before viewers would see the fall.

== Reception ==
Ed Power of The Telegraph gave the special three of five stars, on grounds that the broadcast was thrilling but monotonous, writing "Skyscraper Live draws you into a sort of Zen state, where you are both simultaneously riveted and slightly bored" and "There’s not much to see – and so, the audience will have found themselves in the weird position of both experiencing a pounding heart and occasionally stifling a yawn." According to The Independent, many viewers were unhappy with the live commentary from the panel of hosts, saying it added little to the viewing experience and was distracting.
