= The Measure of a Mountain =

1997 nonfiction book by Bruce Barcott

The Measure of a Mountain: Beauty and Terror on Mount Rainier
- Author: Bruce Barcott
- Published: October 1, 1997
- Publisher: Sasquatch Books
- Pages: 288
- ISBN: 1-57061-074-6
- Website: sasquatchbooks.com/books/the-measure-of-a-mountain/

The Measure of a Mountain: Beauty and Terror on Mount Rainier is a 1997 nonfiction work by Bruce Barcott about the natural and human history of Mount Rainier. Kirkus Reviews called it "enthralling, respectful, bitingly witty, and wise". Publishers Weekly said it "provid[es] clear information on the heritage, history and fascination this mountain creates". A review in a local Washington State newspaper said it was "the first book I've seen that gives you a sense of The Mountain's [Mount Rainier's] geologic history, natural history, political history, climbing history and native mythology, and how they fit together, all in one".
