= Weed the People (book) =

2015 book by Bruce Barcott

Weed the People: The Future of Legal Marijuana in America
- Author: Bruce Barcott
- Publisher: Time Books
- ISBN: 978-1-61893-140-5
- OCLC: 937667506

Weed the People: The Future of Legal Marijuana in America is a 2015 book written by Bruce Barcott and published by Time Books.

== See also ==
- List of books about cannabis
