= Bruce Barcott =

American editor, environmental journalist and author

Bruce Barcott is an American editor, environmental journalist and author. He is a contributing editor of Outside and has written articles for The New York Times Magazine, National Geographic, Mother Jones, Sports Illustrated, Harper's Magazine, Legal Affairs, Utne Reader and others. He has also written a number of books, including The Measure of a Mountain: Beauty and Terror on Mount Rainier (1997) and The Last Flight of the Scarlet Macaw: One Woman's Fight to Save the World's Most Beautiful Bird (2008). In 2009 he was named a Guggenheim Fellow in nonfiction.

Barcott was born in Everett, Washington, and raised in Alaska, California and Washington. After graduating from the University of Washington, he worked for Seattle Weekly for ten years as a writer and editor. He and his ex-wife, writer Claire Dederer, have two children.

He was a Ted Scripps Fellow in Environmental Journalism at the University of Colorado at Boulder. In 2004 his cover story about the Bush Administration's changes to the Clean Air Act for The New York Times Magazine was judged the year's best piece of explanatory reporting by the Society of Environmental Journalists.

He is also a co-host of Leafly's news podcast "The Roll-Up".

== Bibliography ==
- Northwest Passages: A Literary Anthology of the Pacific Northwest from Coyote Tales to Roadside Attractions (1994), Sasquatch Books, ISBN 978-1-57061-005-9
- The Measure of a Mountain: Beauty and Terror on Mount Rainier (1997), Random House, ISBN 978-1-4000-6293-5
- The Last Flight of the Scarlet Macaw: One Woman's Fight to Save the World's Most Beautiful Bird (2008), Random House, ISBN 978-1-4000-6293-5
- Weed the People: The Future of Legal Marijuana in America. Time Books. 2015. ISBN 978-1-61893-140-5.
