= Emma Twyford =

British rock climber

Personal information
- Born: 1986 (age 39–40) Exeter, England
- Education: Sheffield Hallam University; BSc Sport Science & Coaching
- Occupations: Rock climber, Route setter
- Website: www.emmatwyford.com

Climbing career
- Type of climber: Traditional climbing; Bouldering; Sport climbing; Competition climbing
- Highest grade: Redpoint: 9a (5.14d); Onsight/Flash: 8a (5.13b); Bouldering: 7C+ (V10)
- First ascents: Deux Mauvais Melons (8b+, 2023)
- Known for: First British woman to climb a 9a (5.14d) graded route
- Updated on 23 August 2026

Emma Twyford (born 1986) is a British female rock climber and competition climber from Cumbria in England who is known for her ascents in sport climbing, traditional climbing and in bouldering.

On 17 September 2019, she made the first female free ascent (FFFA) of The Big Bang at the Lower Pen Trwyn in North Wales, becoming the first-ever British female climber to ascend a 9a (5.14d)-graded sport climbing route. In 2019, the story of her ascent was released by filmmaker David Petts as a climbing documentary film: The Big Bang - The Emma Twyford Story, and it won the Best Climbing Film at the Kendal Mountain Festival (COVID delayed its general release to 2022).

Twyford is also known for her traditional climbing and has made the FFFA of several major British traditional climbing routes including Rare Lichen in 2013 (at E9 6c, she became the second-ever British woman to climb an E9-graded route), Strawberries in 2014 (one of the most famous British traditional E7-graded climbing routes), Nightmayer in 2018 (at E8 6c), and Yma O Hyd in 2025 (at E10 7a, she became the second-ever British woman to climb an E10-graded route).

Twyford was a British junior bouldering champion and represented Britain on the national competition climbing team for many years, coming 5th in competition lead climbing in the UIAA European Youth Cup in Birmingham in 2001. She also works as a route setter for competitions and a coach.

== See also ==
- Hazel Findlay, British traditional rock climber
- Rachel Pearce, British traditional rock climber
