= Women's Running =

Fitness magazine

Cover of Women's Running Magazine, March 2013

Women's Running, formerly Her Sports + Fitness is a magazine geared towards female running enthusiasts. Published 6 times yearly by Outside, it is the only women's-specific running magazine available in the North American market. According to the publisher it was created "to serve a rapidly growing community of female runners".

The magazine's editor-in-chief is Jen Ator, who was previously the fitness director of Women's Health for ten years.

== History ==
=== Founding ===
Before becoming Women's Running the magazine was first published in 2004 under the name Her Sports + Fitness, founded by former marketing executive and Martha Stewart apprentice Dawna Stone. Stone, also a triathlete, has said she got the idea to start an athletic magazine specifically designed for women after finding out Sports Illustrated for Women, her favorite magazine, was being discontinued.

In 2004, Her Sports won the Florida Magazine Association's Charlie Award for "Best New Magazine."

=== Rebranding ===
In 2008, Her Sports was renamed Women's Running, a change aimed at serving the growing community of female runners—a demographic also noticed by other industry magazines such as Runner's World. According to RunningUSA, the rebranding tripled newsstand sales and dramatically increased subscriptions.

=== Redesign ===
The magazine was redesigned in early 2012, unveiled for the first time in the March/April 2012 issue. The redesign included a new cover featuring celebrities and elite athletes, a "reader's corner" that featured issues popular on the magazine's social media websites, and the "parting shot" – dubbed "a sneak peek into the running life of a professional athlete."

=== Competitor Group Ownership ===
On June 1, 2012 Competitor Group announced their acquisition of Women's Running Magazine, WomensRunning.com, and the Women's Half Marathon Series for an undisclosed amount. "This is a watershed moment for our organization as we greatly expand our media and event portfolio with a collection of powerful assets from which we will create the largest participatory platform in the world dedicated to female athletes,” said Scott Dickey, CEO of CGI in a press release.

=== Current Owner ===
On October 12, 2017, Women's Running, along with other titles including VeloNews and Triathlete as well as book publisher VeloPress, were sold to Pocket Outdoor media. Women's Running was purchased by Outside in 2021.

=== Other ===
In 2016 Amelia Gapin became the first openly transgender woman to be featured on the cover of Women's Running.

== Circulation ==
The magazine has a nationwide circulation of 105,000 (unaudited). The publisher estimates the readership to be 192,000.
