= Summit (magazine) =

American monthly climbing magazine

- Frequency: Monthly
- Publisher: J. Crenshaw / H. Kilness
- Founded: 1955 - 1989 (as Summit Magazine) 1990-1996 (as Summit: The Mountain Journal) 2024 - Present (as Summit Journal)
- Country: United States
- Based in: Big Bear City, California
- Language: English
- Website: www.summitjournal.com
- ISSN: 0039-5056

Summit was America's first monthly climbing and mountaineering magazine, founded in 1955. It is currently published biannually under the name Summit Journal.

== History ==
Summit was founded in November, 1955 by Jene Crenshaw and Helen Kilness in Big Bear City, California. Under the leadership of Crenshaw and Kilness the magazine became very influential in US climbing circles and ran until 1989. Editors included Royal Robbins and David Roberts. Robbins' article "Nuts to You," in the May 1967 issue (Vol. 13, Issue 4), helped introduce clean-climbing techniques in the United States.

In 1990 a new owner David Swanson started Summit - The Mountain Journal, a quarterly publication with editor John Harlin III which ran until the summer of 1996.

In 2023, Michael Levy acquired the rights and announced that the title would relaunch in 2024 as Summit Journal.

== See also ==
- Climbing magazine
- Rock & Ice
