= Matt Segal =

American professional climber (born 1984)

Personal information
- Born: May 8, 1984 (age 42)
- Occupation: Professional climber
- Website: www.mattsegal.com

Climbing career
- Type of climber: Traditional climbing, Bouldering

Matt Segal (born May 8, 1984) is an American professional climber. He participates in a variety of climbing activities including single-pitch traditional climbing and bouldering.

== Early life and education ==
Originally from Miami, Florida, Segal learned to climb in a gym as a child. He studied religion at Naropa University.

== Career ==
Segal began climbing in 1998, competing in indoor competitions across the United States and Europe. After the 2004 climbing competition season, he transitioned to outdoor climbing.

At Squamish in 2006 Segal and his climbing partner Sonnie Trotter climbed The Shadow 5.13b (8a), The Grand Wall 5.13b, and The Black Dyke 5.13b on the Stawamus Chief all free in a single 12-hour session.

Matt Segal worked with National Geographic on an archaeological exploration of 800-year-old man-made caves high on rock faces in the Mustang Region of Nepal. He was recruited for his climbing skills as well as his education in religious studies.

In 2014, Segal was featured in the film Karsts of China, highlighting Enshi Grand Canyon National Park and the Stone Forest.

In 2015 Segal lived in Boulder, Colorado. He sometimes partners with Canadian climber Will Stanhope.

Segal has also begun climbing and paragliding with fellow climber Cedar Wright. The pair traveled to China in 2015 for National Geographic, where they were photographed with Emily Harrington climbing the Red Dragon sport route.

In 2016, he appeared with Harrington and Stanhope in the film Boys in the Bugs, which screened as part of the Reel Rock Film Tour. Also in 2016 Segal and Wright began paragliding down after their climbs.

== Completed traditional ascents ==
- Iron Monkey 5.14 (1st ascent FA) Eldorado Canyon, CO
- The End of the Beginning 5.13 (1st ascent FA) Rocky Mountain National Park, CO
- Cobra Crack 5.14b, Squamish, BC
- Deadline 5.14- (2nd all gear ascent) Boulder Canyon, CO
- Trippin 5.13 (2nd ascent) Eldorado Canyon, CO
- Free Line 5.13 R Eldorado Canyon, CO
- Frayed Line 5.13 R Eldorado Canyon, CO
- Surfs Up 5.13 R Eldorado Canyon, CO
- Death of a Cowboy 5.13- Indian Creek, UT
- Less than Zero 5.13- Indian Creek, UT
- Ruby's Café 5.13- (Flash) Indian Creek, UT
- Triple X 5.13 R/X (2nd ascent) Vedauwoo, WY
- Chief Link-Up: Black Dyke 5.13, Free Grand 5.13 and The Shadow 5.13 (one day with Sonnie Trotter, over 20 pitches total) Squamish, BC
- The Free Rider Grade IV 5.12+ (33 Pitches El Capitan) Yosemite, CA

== Bouldering ==
- Forced Entry V12 Grampians, Australia
- Lost For Life V12 Grampians, Australia
- Eternia V12 Rocky Mountain National Park, CO
- Sun Spot V11 Rocky Mountain National Park, CO
- Bush Pilot V11 Rocky Mountain National Park, CO
- Barbed Wired Beard V11 Rocky Mountain National Park, CO
