= Donald Welsh =

American magazine publisher

- Born: Donald Emory Welsh; October 6, 1943; Youngstown, Ohio, U.S.
- Died: February 6, 2010 (aged 66); Tortola, British Virgin Islands
- Education: Cleveland-Marshall College of Law; Columbia College
- Occupations: publisher, editor
- Employer(s): Fortune Rolling Stone; Outside Arthur Frommer's Budget Travel

Donald Emory Welsh (October 6, 1943 – February 6, 2010) was a magazine publisher and editor.

== Early life ==
Welsh was born in Youngstown, Ohio. His parents were Clevelle and Edward Welsh.

Welsh studied at Columbia College. While there, he was a member of St. Anthony Hall. He then attended the Cleveland-Marshall College of Law.

== Career ==
After being admitted to the Ohio bar, he worked for the Cleveland Trust Company. He soon moved on to the magazine business, starting at Fortune in the advertising department. From there, he moved to Rolling Stone, rising to the position of associate publisher. He went on to be the founding editor of Outside.

Welsh left Outside to run the magazine division of another business group, where he focused largely on children's magazines. He created more than twenty magazines, based on well-known franchises such as Looney Tunes, Mickey Mouse, the Mighty Morphin Power Rangers, the Muppets. He bought the division in 1987, and named it Welsh Publishing Group. He sold Welsh Publishing Group to Marvel Entertainment in October 1994, but agreed to stay on with the company.

In 1998, He co-founded Arthur Frommer's Budget Travel with Arthur Frommer. it sold some 70,000 copies of each issue in newsstand headed toward a circulation of 400,000 by the end of 1999, but struggled to expand its presence. It was sold to Newsweek in 1999. In 2002, he created Budget Living magazine to critical acclaim, but not commercial success. However, it won the general excellence award from the American Society of Magazine Editors.

He also created the magazine ForbesLife MountainTime with Forbes.

== Personal life ==
In 1996, Welsh married Bourne Floyd. They lived in Boston Corner, New York. They had a daughter named Leah.

Welsh died of drowning, in an accident in Tortola, the British Virgin Islands at the age of 66.
