= Outside (company) =

American company

Outside Inc.
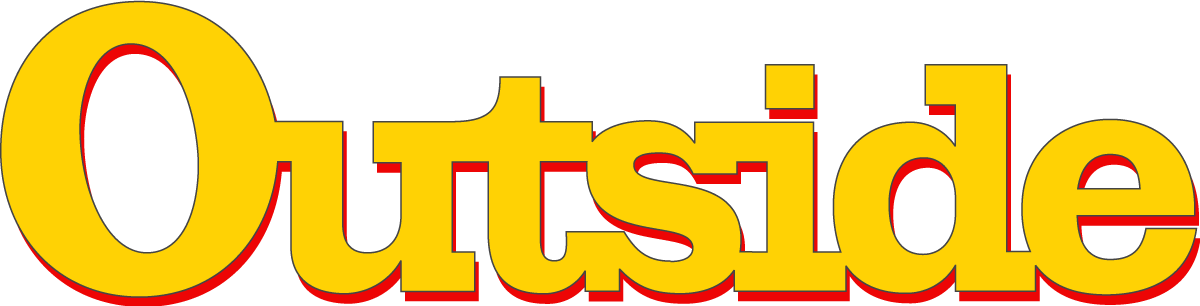
- Type: Private
- Industry: Publishing and sports-related operations
- Headquarters: Boulder, Colorado
- Area served: Worldwide
- Products: Magazines; Websites; Online mapping; Television production; Event management; Online education; Mobile apps; Marketing
- Website: outsideinc.com

Outside Inc., formerly called Pocket Outdoor Media until February 2021, is an American company focused on sports and recreation (especially outdoor sports), fitness and nutrition. It has various ventures such as Outside magazine, Outside TV, the Gaia GPS and Trailforks trail mapping apps, Climbing magazine, Peloton magazine, Rock & Ice magazine, Women's Running magazine and Yoga Journal. The company is headquartered in Boulder, Colorado.

== Overview and history ==
As Pocket Outdoor Media, the company received Series A venture capital financing from Jazz Venture Partners, Next Ventures, and Zone 5 Ventures, and announced the funding together with the acquisition of three divisions of Active Interest Media in June 2020.

In February 2021, Pocket Outdoor Media acquired Outside Integrated Media and renamed itself to Outside, Inc.

Outside Inc. is headquartered in Boulder, Colorado. As of July 2021, it also had offices in

- Carbondale, Colorado
- Denver, Colorado
- Easthampton, Massachusetts
- Frankfurt, Germany
- Melbourne, Australia
- New York City, New York
- Ojai, California
- San Diego, California
- San Francisco, California
- Santa Fe, New Mexico
- Squamish, British Columbia
- Toronto, Ontario

Company acquisitions have included:

- Three divisions of Active Interest Media, purchased in June 2020
- Big Stone Publishing, purchased in October 2020
- FinisherPix, a sports event photography company, purchased in November 2020
- Outside Integrated Media, purchased in February 2021
- Inkwell Media, a marketing agency, purchased in November 2021
- Roam Media, an online education brand, purchased in November 2021
- Fastest Known Time (FKT), purchased in March 2022.
- Stomp Sessions, an online action sports tutorials learning platform, purchased in October 2022 for integration into the Outside Learn operation

The company offers a monthly subscription service called Outside+ for bundled access to several of its websites, use of its mobile app navigation services, event discounts, and sports training programs.

== Brands and operations ==
Brands owned by the company include

- Fastest Known Time (FKT), an outdoor sports speed record tracking website (purchased in March 2022)
- Inkwell Media, a marketing agency (purchased in November 2021)
- Roam Media, an online education brand (purchased in November 2021)
- Pinkbike cycling website, CyclingTips website, and Trailforks GPS-enabled trail database and mobile app (purchased in July 2021)
- Outside Shop outdoor-related product sales website (purchased as the Cairn subscription box service and renamed in April 2021)
- Brands acquired via the purchase of Outside Integrated Media in February 2021:
  - Outside magazine
  - Outside TV television network (launched in 2010)
- Peloton magazine, the athleteReg sporting events organizing service and mobile app, and the Gaia GPS trail mapping mobile app (purchased in February 2021 separately from the purchase of Outside Integrated Media)
- Beta mountain biking magazine (launched in March 2021)
- Paleo magazine (purchased in November 2020)
- FinisherPix, a sports event photography company (purchased in November 2020)
- Gym Climber, Rock & Ice, and Trail Runner magazines (via purchase of Big Stone Publishing in October 2020)
- Brands acquired via the purchase of three divisions of Active Interest Media in June 2020:
  - Outside Business Journal, formerly SNEWS, a sports trade website and former trade magazine (rebranded in March 2021 after purchase as SNEWS)
  - Yoga Journal, Vegetarian Times, Ski, Climbing, Backpacker, Oxygen, Clean Eating, Better Nutrition, Muscle & Performance and NatuRx magazines
  - National Park Trips trip planning websites and magazines for National Parks
  - NASTAR, a recreational ski and snowboard racing program founded in 1968 by Ski magazine
  - Warren Miller Entertainment, an action sports film company
  - Fly Fishing Film Tour (F3T), a fly fishing film event program
- Roll Massif, an event production company purchased just before the Active Interest Media purchases of June 2020
- Women's Running, VeloNews, Triathlete, and Bicycle Retailer and Industry News magazines (owned prior to the June 2020 purchases from Active Interest Media)
- VeloPress book publishing (owned prior to the June 2020 purchases from Active Interest Media)
- VeloSwap biking and skiing expo event (owned prior to the June 2020 purchases from Active Interest Media)
- The Box, a fitness website and possibly a magazine
- Other "Outside" branded operations
  - Outside Books (book publishing)
  - Outside Events Cycling Series (cycling event program)
  - Outside Learn (online education)

Discontinued and divested brands:

- PodiumRunner, a defunct running magazine shut down in March 2022 (already owned by Pocket Outdoor Media prior to the June 2020 purchases from Active Interest Media)
- IDEA Health and Fitness Association, a membership association for fitness and wellness professionals (purchased from Active Interest Media in June 2020, sold in April 2022 to its CEO Amy Boone Thompson)
