= Hazel Findlay =

British rock climber

Personal information
- Nationality: British
- Born: Bristol, England, U.K.
- Education: University of Bristol, Bachelor of Arts (B.A.), Philosophy (2011)
- Website: www.hazel-findlay.com

Climbing career
- Type of climber: Trad climbing; Sport climbing; Big wall climbing
- Highest grade: Redpoint: 5.14d (9a) Sport 5.14c (8c+) Trad

Hazel Findlay (born May 1989) is a British traditional climber, sport climber and big wall climber. She was the first female British climber to climb a route graded E9, and a route graded 8c (5.14b). She did the third ascent of the Yosemite traditional route Magic Line 5.14c (8c+). She has free climbed El Capitán four times on four different routes and made many first female ascents on other routes. Climbing magazine gave her their Golden Piton Award (Alpine) for traditional climbing in 2013.

== Biography ==
Findlay was born in 1989, the daughter of climber Steve Findlay. She began climbing on the sea cliffs of Pembrokeshire with her father when she was six years old. She became a six-time junior national rock climbing champion but gave up competition climbing in favor of traditional climbing. She is a graduate of the University of Bristol, where she studied philosophy. She lives in North Wales. She married climber Angus Kille in Las Vegas in 2023.

== Notable climbs ==
In 2019, Findlay made the 3rd ascent of Magic Line (2nd ascent placing gear), a route graded 5.14b/c (8c/+) at Vernal Fall in Yosemite National Park. She made the first female ascent of a British E9 grade climb with her June 2011 climb of Dave Birkett's route Once Upon a Time in the South West (E9 6c) at Dyer's Lookout in Devon.

She is the first British woman to free climb El Capitán in Yosemite National Park, which she has done four times: she made the first female ascent of Golden Gate in 2011, the first female ascent of Pre-Muir Wall in 2012, and an ascent of Freerider in only three days in 2013. In 2017 she free-climbed the Salathé Wall.

She was the first person to free-climb Adder Crack (5.13a), in Squamish, British Columbia, in 2012. She was the first person to climb 'Tainted Love' in Squamish (5.13d). With Jack Geldard, she made the first ascent of the front face of the Aiguille de Saussure, a spire in the Mont Blanc massif, Chamonix, France, also in 2012. In 2022, along with Alex Honnold, she made a first free ascent of Ingmikortilaq, a 3,750-foot wall and one of the world’s tallest monoliths, in Greenland. A more complete list of Hazel's ascents can be found on theCrag.

Other first female ascents of trad routes by Findlay include:

- Air Sweden (5.13b R) in Indian Creek, Utah, in April 2010.
- 69 (5.13b/c) in Squamish, later in 2010.
- San Simeon (E8) in Pembrokeshire, in May 2011.
- The Doors (approx 5.13) in Cadarese, Italy, in 2012.
- Chicama (E9 6c) in Anglesey, in early 2013.
- First ascent of Tainted Love (5.13d R, 8b+, E9) in Squamish, in April 2018.
- Magic Line (5.14c R, 8c+, E10) in Yosemite, on 26 November 2019.
- Mission Impossible (E9 7a) on Gallt yr Ogof, Wales, on 22 September 2020.

As well as trad climbing, Findlay has also climbed sport climbing routes; most notably:

- In 2014, she climbed Fish Eye in Oliana, Spain, reaching a difficulty level of 8c/5.14b. Although not a first female ascent (the route had been climbed in 2010 by Daila Ojeda) it was the highest level attained by a British female climber.
- In 2017, she climbed Mind Control (8c), also in Oliana.
- In 2022, she climbed Esclatamasters (9a) in Catalonia, Spain.

== Awards and sponsorship ==
Climbing magazine gave Findlay their Golden Piton Award for traditional climbing in 2013, citing climbs including Chicama and Freerider.

She is professionally sponsored by Black Diamond Equipment, La Sportiva, Sea to Summit, Motion Nutrition.

She has launched a mental training business for climbers called "Strong Mind Climbing".

== Filmography ==
- Sea Fever: Classic Climbs of Pembroke (2003)
- Monkey See Monkey Do: Slate Monkeys (2009)
- Tent Bound in Devil's Bay (2011)
- Odyssey (2012)
- Reel Rock S1 E10: Spice Girl (2013)
- Africa Fusion (2014)
- Epic Climber (2015)
- Magnetic Mountains (2017)
- Reel Rock S4 E1: Break on Through (2017)
- Brit Rock II: Free Flow (2018)
- Expedition with Steve Backshall: Oman - Desert Fortress (2019)
- Pretty Strong (2020)
- Reel Rock S7 E3: Action Directe (2021)
- Reel Rock S7 E7: First Ascent/Last Ascent (2021)
- Black Diamond Presents: Foiled with Hazel Findlay (2022)
- Arctic Ascent with Alex Honnold (2024)
- Reel Rock S10 E1: Yeah Buddy (2024)
- The Sound (2025)

== See also ==
- Rachel Pearce, British traditional rock climber
- Emma Twyford, British traditional rock climber
