= European Outdoor Film Tour =

The European Outdoor Film Tour (EOFT) is the largest outdoor film tour in Europe, showing films on the themes of extreme sports, outdoors and adventure. Every year, the festival is held in hundreds of venues in about dozen countries. Number of participating countries varies slightly from year to year.

== History ==
In 2001, the European Outdoor Film Tour, founded by Joachim Hellinger and Thomas Witt, began movie screenings in 16 cities. For about two hours, various short films on extreme sports are shown in documentary form. The composition of the films changes from year to year. They are shown in theaters, universities and special event locations in the respective cities. Over the years, the number of cities where the films are shown has increased. In the 2014-2015 tour, the festival reached over 300 screenings in 163 cities and 14 countries. In the process, the EOFT attracted more than 200,000 viewers. In the past, at least one stage of the film festival has been held at BMW Welt. Every year, the audience votes online to select the best film of the respective program, which receives the Audience Award. Long standing sponsors of the festival are Mammut and Gore-Tex.
