= Clown Motel =

Clown-themed motel in Tonopah, Nevada, US

The Clown Motel
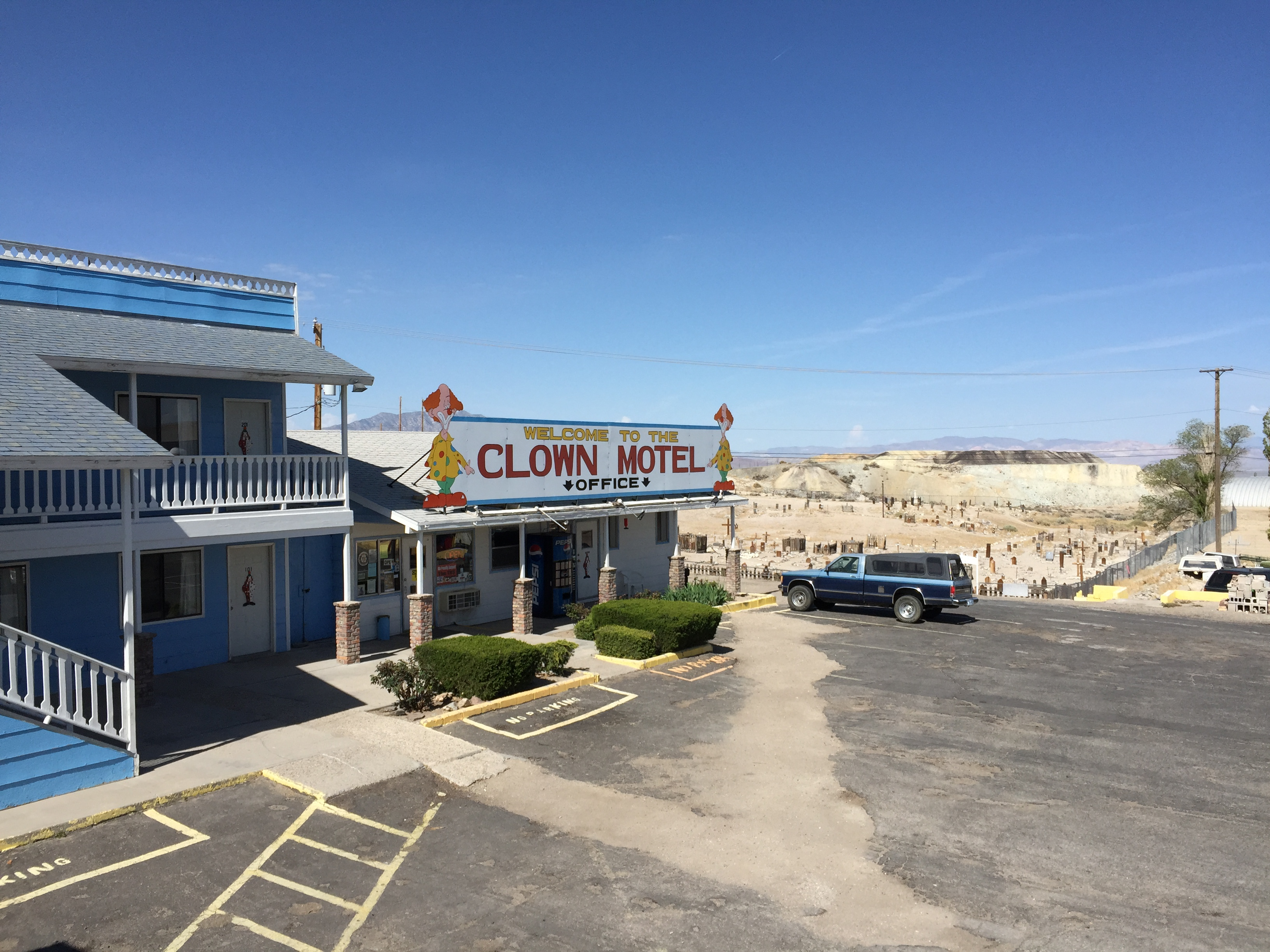
- The Clown Motel with Tonopah Cemetery visible.
- Alternative names: The World Famous Clown Motel

General information
- Location: 521 N Main St, Tonopah, Nevada, United States
- Coordinates: 38°04′20.14″N 117°14′15.72″W
- Opened: 1985
- Owner: Leory and Leona David (1985–1995); Bob Perchetti (1995–2016); Vijay Mehar (2019–present)

Other information
- Number of rooms: 31

Website
- theclownmotelusa.com

The Clown Motel is a clown-themed motel along north Main Street in Tonopah, Nevada, which has been referred to as "America's scariest motel". The building is located adjacent to the historic Tonopah Cemetery, where the father of the original owners is buried.

== History ==
The 33-room Clown Motel was opened in 1985 by Leroy and Leona David in honor of their late father Clarence David whose collection of over 150 clown statues was used to decorate the property.

In 1995, Bob Perchetti bought the motel and operated it for 22 years until 2017 when he put the property up for sale for $900,000. Two years later the property was purchased by Vijay Mehar who appointed his former art director family friend Hame Anand as CEO, who not only gave a new facelift to the motel but created a new identity as The World Famous Clown Motel and increased the collection from 600 clown statues to over 4,000 pieces of clown memorabilia.
