= Cedar Wright =

American rock climber and filmmaker (born 1975)

Personal information
- Born: March 16, 1975 (age 51) Tollhouse, California
- Education: California State Polytechnic University, Humboldt
- Occupations: Rock climber; filmmaker
- Spouse: Nellie Milfeld
- Website: www.cedarwright.com

Climbing career
- Type of climber: Big wall climbing; Alpine climbing; Traditional climbing

Cedar Wright (born March 16, 1975) is an American rock climber and climbing filmmaker based in Boulder, Colorado. He originally had his start big wall climbing in Yosemite and signed with The North Face in 2002. Wright is known for his climbing documentaries such as the Sufferfest series.

== Early life ==
Cedar Wright was born on March 16, 1975, in Tollhouse, California, in the rural foothills of the Sierra Nevada. He picked up photography in high school and attended the California State Polytechnic University, Humboldt, graduating with a bachelor's degree in English and creative writing. He first started climbing there when he was 21 after seeing people climb the area's sea cliffs and was introduced into climbing by his roommate. After college, he moved into his truck and worked as little as possible to let him have as much time climbing in different areas.

== Career ==
After being inspired by a National Geographic feature of the first American climbing expedition to Queen Maud Land, Wright arrived in Yosemite National Park in 1998 and joined the Stone Monkeys climbing group, being mentored by Sean Leary. For five years, he lived in Camp 4, was on the park's search and rescue team, and climbed in his free time, wintering at Joshua Tree National Park. Wright first signed with The North Face for an expedition in 2002, when he climbed the Hand of Fatima in Mali alongside Jimmy Chin and Kevin Thaw.

In 2012, Wright made a first ascent of a new route at Morcheka in Crimea with Emily Harrington, Matt Segal, and Cory Richards. In June 2013, he and Lucho Rivera made the first free ascent of the southwest face of Liberty Cap in Yosemite. Wright's first documentary, Sufferfest 1, a production with his close friend Alex Honnold, involved the duo climbing all of California's 14,000 ft (4,300 m) peaks by bike and had showings at the Banff Mountain Film Festival and Mountainfilm in 2013. He later followed it up the next year with a sequel, Sufferfest 2, in which they biked up forty desert towers.

In 2018, Wright, James Pearson, and Yuji Hirayama made the first ascent of Cape Enniberg in the Faroe Islands. During the trip, they also developed four new routes to climb Trælanípan. In 2023, Wright set up the Dirtbag Fund, which supported climbers that reject employment and other social norms to pursue their hobby; he distributed five grants of $3,000 in 2025.

== Personal life ==
Wright is married to Nellie Milfeld, a public defender and fellow climber. He occasionally practices mantra meditation while climbing.
