= Climbing (magazine) =

American rock climbing magazine

Coordinates: 40.024304°N 105.225206°W

- Cover of the magazine, October 26, 2015
- Frequency: Nine times a year
- Founder: Harvey T. Carter
- Founded: 1970; 56 years ago
- Company: Outside
- Country: United States
- Based in: Boulder, Colorado
- Language: English
- Website: climbing.com
- OCLC: 4040888

Climbing is a major US-based rock climbing magazine and one of the largest climbing magazines in the world by circulation. The headquarters is in Boulder, Colorado. It is published nine times a year.

Climbing was first published in 1970 by US climber, Harvey Carter. In 1972, Bill Dunaway, the owner of The Aspen Times, took over the magazine. In 1974, US climber Michael Kennedy was appointed editor of Climbing, and the magazine's international profile and readership grew substantially under his editorship. In 1987, Kennedy bought Climbing from Dunaway and in 1997, he sold the magazine to Cowles Enthusiast Media, and departed from the publication a year after the transaction. In 2007, Climbing was purchased by Skram Media, the publisher of Urban Climber Magazine. In 2010, Skram was sold to Active Interest Media (AIM), and in 2020-21, the media start-up Pocket Outdoor Media, acquired several divisions of AIM, which included Climbing, and also several other media companies, including its main competitor, Rock & Ice, and also the related publication, Outside; POM merged Climbing with Rock & Ice.

== Golden Pitons ==
Each year, Climbing gives out a number of awards, called the Golden Pitons. Award categories include: Sport Climbing, Breakout Performance, Climber of the Year, Rusty Piton, Lifetime Achievement, Comeback, Alpine, Boldest Move, and Competition.

== See also ==
- Alpinist magazine
- Summit magazine
- Rock & Ice
