= David Roberts (climber) =

American climber, mountaineer, and author (1943–2021)

- Born: May 29, 1943; Denver, Colorado, U.S.
- Died: August 20, 2021 (aged 78); Boston, Massachusetts, U.S.
- Education: Harvard University (B.S., Mathematics); University of Denver (Ph.D., English, 1970)
- Occupations: Climber, author
- Known for: Author of books on mountain climbing
- Parent(s): Walter Orr Roberts (father); Janet Smock (mother)

David Stuart Roberts (May 29, 1943 – August 20, 2021) was an American climber, mountaineer, college professor, and author of books and articles about climbing and the history of the American Southwest. He was particularly noted for his books The Mountain of My Fear and Deborah: A Wilderness Narrative, chronicling major ascents in Alaska in the 1960s, which had a major impact on the form of mountaineering literature.

== Early life and climbing in Alaska ==
Roberts was born in Denver, Colorado, on May 29, 1943. His father, Walter Orr Roberts, was an astronomer and scientist who headed the Harvard College Observatory in nearby Boulder; his mother, Janet Naomi Smock Roberts, was elected to its city council. Roberts attended Boulder High School, before studying mathematics at Harvard University, graduating in 1965. He was a member of and former president of the Harvard Mountaineering Club where he led exploratory first ascents of many peaks in Alaska. He went on to receive a Ph.D. in English from the University of Denver in 1970.

In thirteen seasons spent in the Alaskan wilderness, Roberts was well known for many first ascents, including the Wickersham Wall on Denali, the west rib of Mount Huntington, climbing in the Western Brooks Range and the Kichatna Spires, and on the east face of Mount Dickey. Roberts also named Alaska's Revelation Mountains, giving many of the peaks Biblical names because he had been reading the Bible as part of his English literature studies at the time.

== Career ==
Roberts was a professor of literature at Hampshire College, in Amherst, Massachusetts, from 1970 to 1979. He also designed the college's Outdoors Program. He was often acknowledged as the "dean" of American climbing literature and published extensively on mountaineering. He ultimately authored 32 books on the subject, as well as the celebrated adventures of historical figures. These included books on the Ancestral Puebloans and a biography on Jean Stafford.

Roberts also mentored other writers, most notably Jon Krakauer, who he taught at Hampshire. He contributed to Outside, as well as National Geographic, National Geographic Adventure, and The Atlantic Monthly. His final book, Into the Great Emptiness: Peril and Survival on the Greenland Ice Cap, is scheduled to be released in mid-2022, one year after his death.

== Personal life ==
Roberts married Sharon Morris in 1967. They did not have children. They resided in Cambridge, Massachusetts, before moving to Watertown.

Roberts died on August 20, 2021, at Brigham and Women's Hospital in Boston. He was 78, and was diagnosed with stage IV throat cancer six years before his death.

== Bibliography ==
- The Mountain of My Fear (1968) Vanguard Press. ISBN 9780814901922
- Deborah: A Wilderness Narrative (1970) ISBN 9780814906774
- Moments of Doubt: And Other Mountaineering Writings (1986) The Mountaineers. ISBN 0-89886-118-7
- Jean Stafford: The Life of a Writer (1988) ISBN 9780312302177
- Once They Moved Like The Wind: Cochise, Geronimo, and the Apache Wars (1993) ISBN 9780671885564
- Escape Routes: Further Adventure Writings of David Roberts (1997) The Mountaineers. ISBN 0-89886-509-3
- In Search of the Old Ones (1997) Simon & Schuster. ISBN 0-684-83212-7
- A Newer World: Kit Carson John C. Fremont and the Claiming of the American West (2001) Simon & Schuster. ISBN 0-684-87021-5
- Great Exploration Hoaxes (2001) Modern Library. ISBN 0-679-78324-5
- True Summit: What Really Happened on the Legendary Ascent on Annapurna (2002) Simon & Schuster. ISBN 0-7432-0327-5
- Escape from Lucania : An Epic Story of Survival (2002) Simon & Schuster. ISBN 0-7432-2432-9
- Four Against the Arctic: Shipwrecked for Six Years at the Top of the World (2003) Simon & Schuster. ISBN 0-7432-2431-0
- On the Ridge Between Life and Death: A Climbing Life Reexamined (2005) Simon & Schuster. ISBN 0-7432-5518-6
- Sandstone Spine: Seeking the Anasazi on the First Traverse of the Comb Ridge, photographs by Greg Child (2005) The Mountaineers. ISBN 1-59485-005-4
- The Pueblo Revolt: The Secret Rebellion that Drove the Spaniards Out of the Southwest (2005) Simon & Schuster. ISBN 0-7432-5517-8
- Devil's Gate: Brigham Young and the Great Mormon Handcart Tragedy (2008) Simon & Schuster. ISBN 1-4165-3988-3
- The Last of His Kind: The Life and Adventures of Bradford Washburn, America's Boldest Mountaineer (2009) William Morrow. ISBN 978-0-06-156094-1
- Finding Everett Ruess: The Life and Unsolved Disappearance of a Legendary Wilderness Explorer (2011) Broadway. ISBN 978-0-307-59176-0
- Alone on the Ice: The Greatest Survival Story in the History of Exploration (January 21, 2013) W. W. Norton & Company. ISBN 9780393240160
- Lost World of the Old Ones: Discoveries in the Ancient Southwest (April 2015) W.W. Norton & Company. ISBN 978-0-393-24162-4
- Limits of the Known (February 20, 2018) W. W. Norton & Company. ISBN 978-0-393-60986-8
- Escalante's Dream: On the Trail of the Spanish Discovery of the Southwest (July 16, 2019) W. W. Norton & Company. ISBN 978-0-393-65206-2
- The Bears Ears: A Human History of America's Most Endangered Wilderness (February 2021) W.W. Norton & Company. ISBN 978-1324004813
- Into the Great Emptiness: Peril and Survival on the Greenland Ice Cap (December 13, 2022) W. W. Norton & Company. ISBN 978-0-393-86811-1

=== Co-authored books ===
- Mount McKinley: The Conquest of Denali, with Bradford Washburn (1991) Harry N Abrams. ISBN 0-8109-3611-9
- Iceland: Land of the Sagas, with Jon Krakauer. (1998) Villard. ISBN 0-375-75267-6
- The Lost Explorer: Finding Mallory on Mt. Everest, with Conrad Anker. (2001) Simon & Schuster. ISBN 0-684-87152-1
- No Shortcuts to the Top: Climbing the World's 14 Highest Peaks, with Ed Viesturs. (2006) Broadway. ISBN 0-7679-2470-3
- K2: Life and Death on the World's Most Dangerous Mountain, with Ed Viesturs. (2010) Broadway. ISBN 0-7679-3260-9
- The Will to Climb: Obsession and Commitment and the Quest to Climb Annapurna—the World's Deadliest Peak, with Ed Viesturs. (2011) Crown. ISBN 0-307-72042-X
- Alone on the Wall, with Alex Honnold. (2015) W. W. Norton & Company. ISBN 978-0-393-24762-6

=== Edited books ===
- Points Unknown: The Greatest Adventure Writing of the Twentieth Century (2002) W. W. Norton & Company. ISBN 0-393-32378-1

== Selected awards ==
- 2018 Boardman Tasker Prize for Mountain Literature
- Prix Mediterrane
- Prix du Salon de Livre de Passy
- Prix d'Autrans
- American Alpine Club Literary Award
- Folio Magazine Award
- 2003 Grand Prize at Banff Mountain Book Festival, Escape from Lucania
- 2001 National Geographic Adventure ranked The Mountain of My Fear and Deborah among the 100 best adventure books ever written
