= Hand of Fatima (rock formation) =

Landform in Mali

- Gami Tondo, Needles of Gami
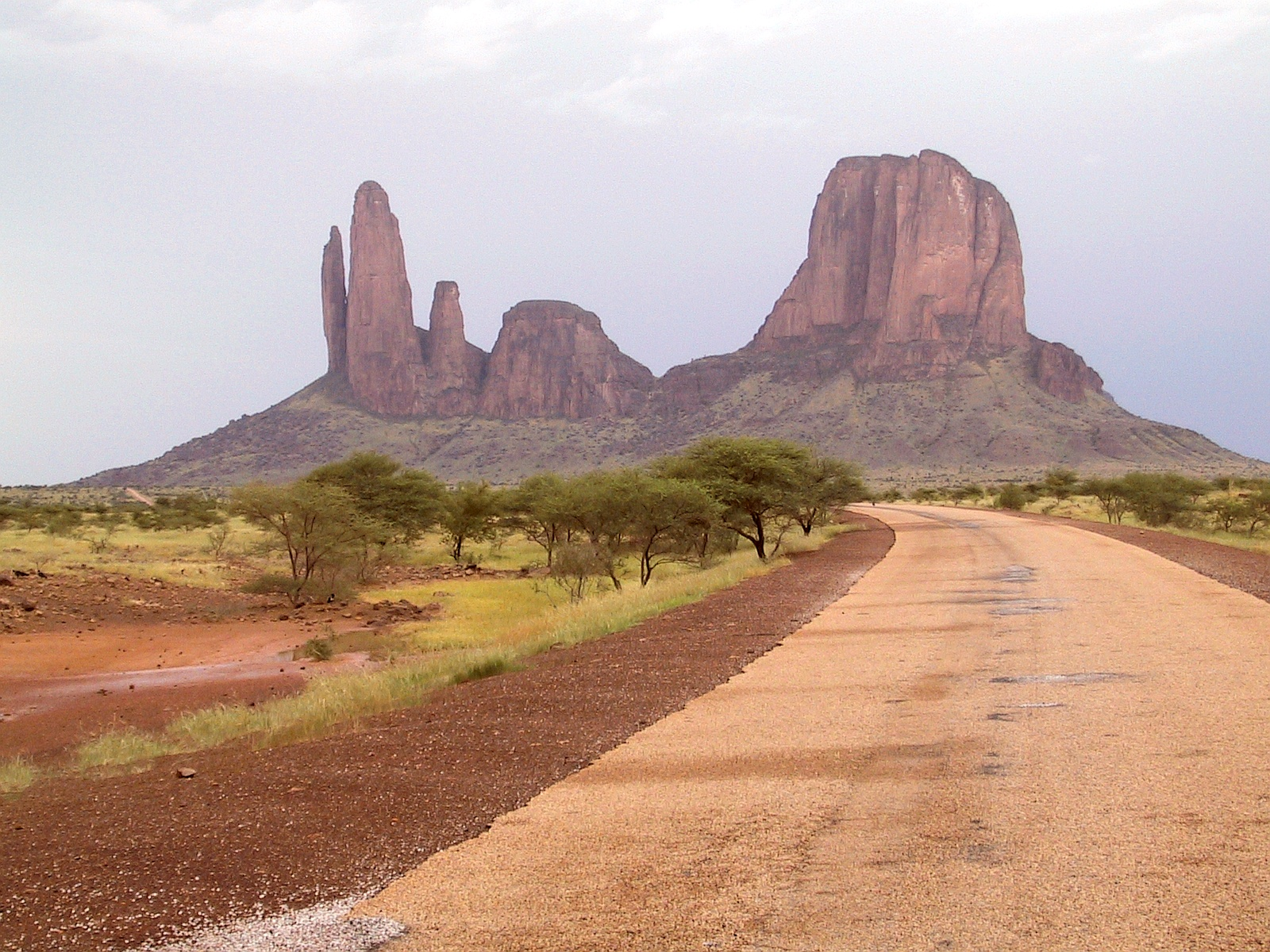

Highest point
- Coordinates: 15.246677°N 1.802920°W

Geography
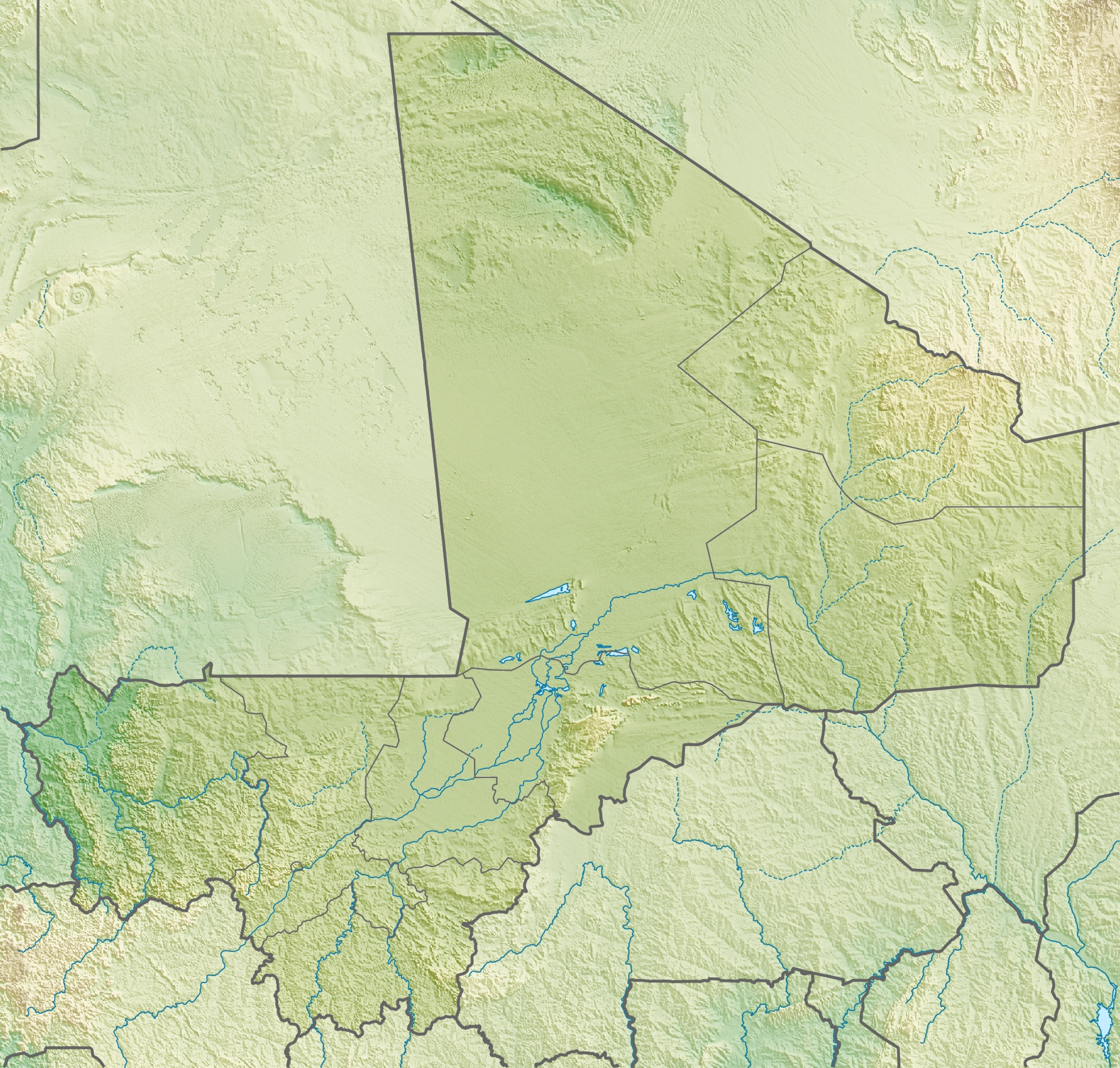
- Location within Mali
- Location: Mopti Region, Mali

The Hand of Fatima, also called Gami Tondo, and the Needles of Gami (French: La Main de Fatima or Aiguilles de Gami) is a rock formation in the Mopti Region of Mali near Hombori consisting of a number of sandstone pillars. The formation was named for its appearance of similarity to a human hand, particularly that of Muhammed's daughter, which is a protective symbol in Islamic tradition known as the Hamsa. The formation's "fingers" are named Kaga Pamari, Kaga Tondo, Wangel, Debridu, and Suri Tondo.

== Rock Climbing ==
The Hand of Fatima has drawn rock climbers to the area including the Italian climbing group, the Lecco Spiders, who made numerous ascents in December of 2006. Among the challenges available to climbers on the Hand of Fatima is an approximately 1,500 foot overhanging cliff face.

== See also ==
- Hombori
- Mount Hombori
- Monument Valley
