= Arctic Ascent with Alex Honnold =

TV series on climbing in Greenland

Arctic Ascent with Alex Honnold is a 2024 television series that follows climber Alex Honnold on an expedition to ascend Ingmikortilaq, a 1,143 metre sea cliff in Greenland, one of the highest unclimbed cliff faces.
