= Potrero Chico =

Rock climbing area in Mexico

Coordinates: 25°57′1.08″N 100°28′34.27″W

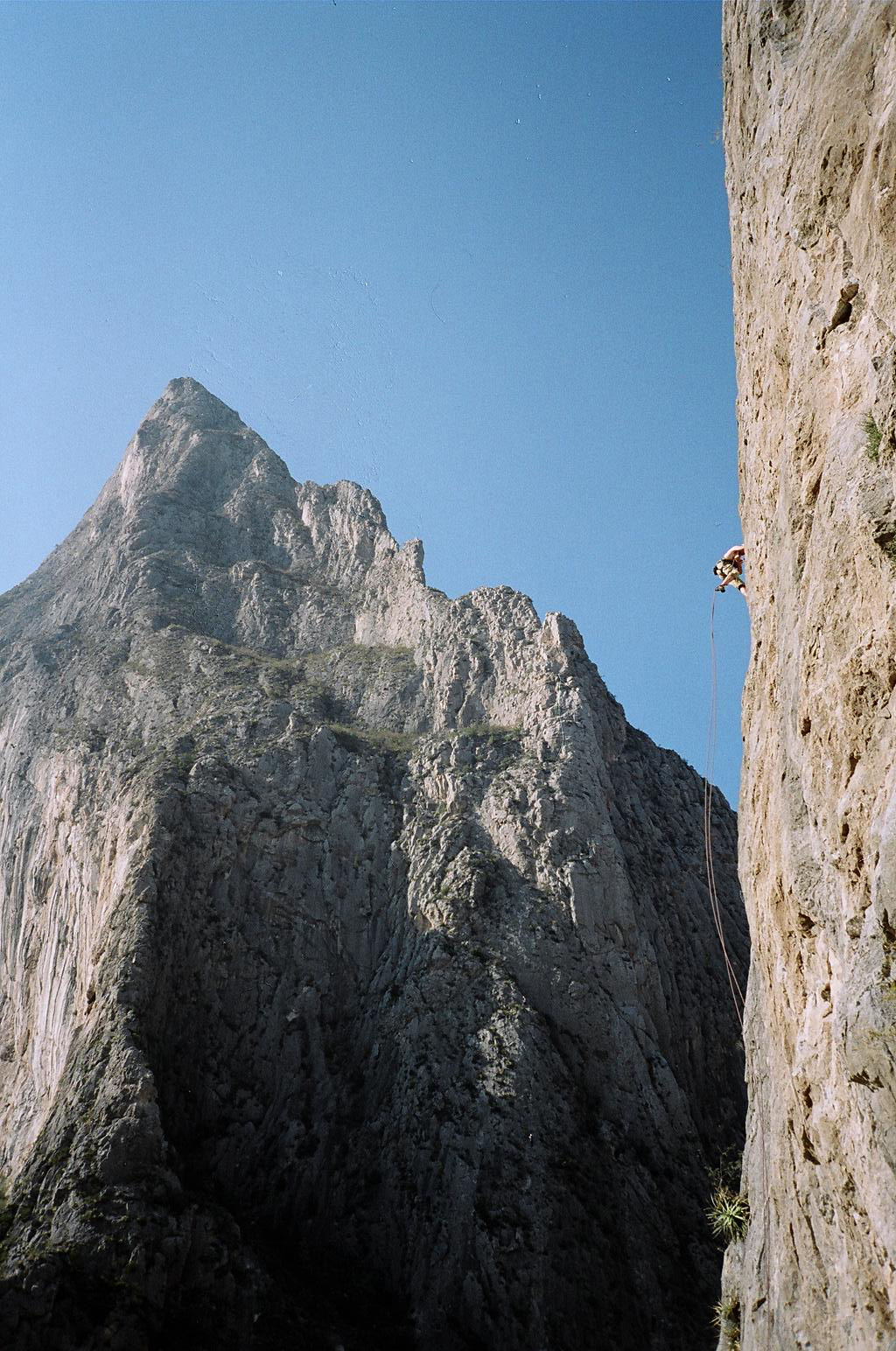
A view of El Toro and the Mota Wall

El Potrero Chico is a rock and big wall climbing area in the Mexican state of Nuevo León, 3 kilometres (1.9 mi) outside the town of Hidalgo, within the Sierra del Fraile protected area. El Potrero Chico is a unique geological formation of limestone cliffs and spires, some as high as 2,000 feet (610 m).

== Rock climbing ==
There is a large range of different climbs, most of them in the 5.8 to 5.13 grade. The type of climbing can range from steep overhanging faces to easy slabs. The rock is usually quite sharp. The climbs are mostly situated in a canyon at the entrance of the park, while the interior offers undeveloped mountain terrain with many mountain biking routes, ranging from very easy to expert options.

Rock climbers from Austin, Texas, notably, Jeff Jackson, Kevin Gallahger, Craig Pacinda, and Alex Catlin, along with Colorado climber Kurt Smith started developing the area in the 1990s. Development continued in the 21st century, notably by first ascensionists Alex Catlin, Ed Wright, and Dane Bass. Many climbers have attempted to build bridges with the local community, but there remains much work to be done.

== Geology ==
The history of the creation of Potrero Chico's massive limestone walls goes back over 200 million years. At its core, Potrero Chico is the result of a salt dome that pushed the existing limestone layers into the slanted vertical orientation that is seen today. With the limestone layers erected, the weathering process within the canyon began. An overflow from a nearby water source breached the edge of the vertical limestone and poured over. The rate of erosion depended on the velocity of the exiting water, and began to form the Canyon we see today.
