= Outside (magazine) =

American outdoors magazine

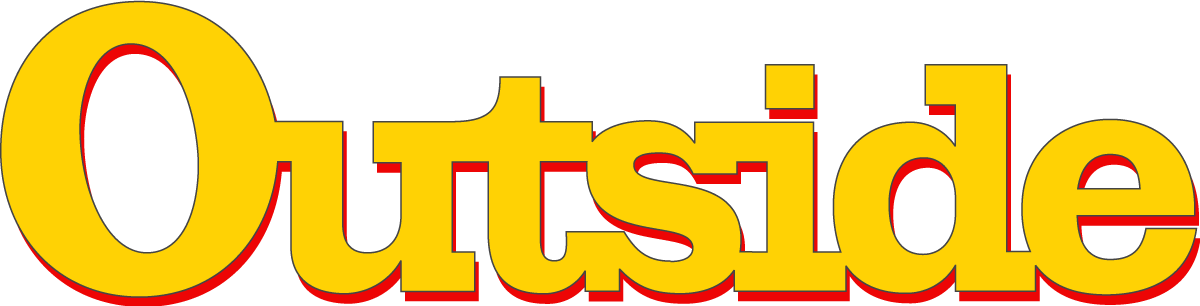

- Editor-in-Chief: Lawrence J. Burke
- Frequency: Quarterly
- Total circulation: 721,700 (2024)
- First issue: September 1977
- Company: Outside, Inc.
- Country: United States
- Based in: Boulder, Colorado
- Language: English
- Website: outsideonline.com
- ISSN: 0278-1433

Outside is a magazine focused on the outdoors. The first issue of the Outside magazine was published in September 1977. It is published by Outside Inc., a company that also owns various other ventures.

== History ==
Outside founders were Jann Wenner (the first editor in chief), William Randolph Hearst III (its first managing editor), and Jack Ford (an assistant to founding publisher Donald Welsh and a son of former U.S. president Gerald Ford). Wenner sold Outside to Lawrence J. Burke two years later. Burke merged it into his magazine Mariah (founded in 1976) and after a period of using the name Mariah/Outside kept the Outside name for the merged magazine.

In 2021, Burke sold Outside to Pocket Outdoor Media. In March 2025, 35 journalists signed a letter requesting their names be removed from the magazine’s masthead in protest over recent layoffs and censorship.

== Contributors ==
Christopher Keyes was the editor as of 2021. John Rasmus, one editor of Outside, launched the career of Jon Krakauer and other freelance travel and adventure writers. Though the magazine has tilted toward a more commercial aesthetic in recent years, it has also recruited figures from the literary world for freelance assignments. Writers whose work has appeared in Outside include Sebastian Junger, Bruce Barcott, Tim Cahill, Daniel Coyle, E. Annie Proulx, naturalist and author David Quammen, and Bob Shacochis. Songwriter David Berkeley also worked for Outside.

== See also ==
- Field and Stream
- Outdoor Life
- Sports Afield
