= Pauline Levasseur =

French politician (born 1991)

Member of the French National Assembly for Pas-de-Calais's 2nd constituency
- Incumbent
- Assumed office 22 October 2024
- Preceded by: Agnès Pannier-Runacher

Personal details
- Born: 24 July 1991 (age 34)
- Party: Renaissance (since 2017)

Pauline Levasseur (born 24 July 1991) is a French politician serving as a member of the National Assembly since 2024. She succeeded Agnès Pannier-Runacher, who was appointed minister of ecological transition.
