= Jean-Pierre Defontaine =

French politician (1937–2022)

Member of the French National Assembly
- In office 3 April 1978 – 17 June 2007
- Preceded by: position established
- Succeeded by: Jacqueline Maquet
- Constituency: Pas-de-Calais's 1st constituency

General Councilor of the Canton of Avesnes-le-Comte
- In office 2004–2015
- Preceded by: Louis Petit
- Succeeded by: Maryse Delassus; Michel Petit

Member of the Regional Council of Nord-Pas-de-Calais-Picardie
- In office 17 March 1986 – 15 March 1998

Mayor of Hénin-sur-Cojeul
- In office 14 March 1983 – 18 June 1996
- Preceded by: Jean Antoniazzi
- Succeeded by: Pierre Roussez

Personal details
- Born: 4 February 1937 Mametz, France
- Died: 1 January 2022 (aged 84) Hénin-sur-Cojeul, France
- Party: PRG

Jean-Pierre Defontaine (4 February 1937 – 1 January 2022) was a French politician. A member of the Radical Party of the Left, he served Pas-de-Calais's 1st constituency from 1978 to 2007. He also served as President of the football club RC Lens from 1976 to 1979. In 2015, a multipurpose venue was named after him in Hénin-sur-Cojeul. Defontaine died on 1 January 2022, at the age of 82.
