= Jacqueline Maquet =

French politician

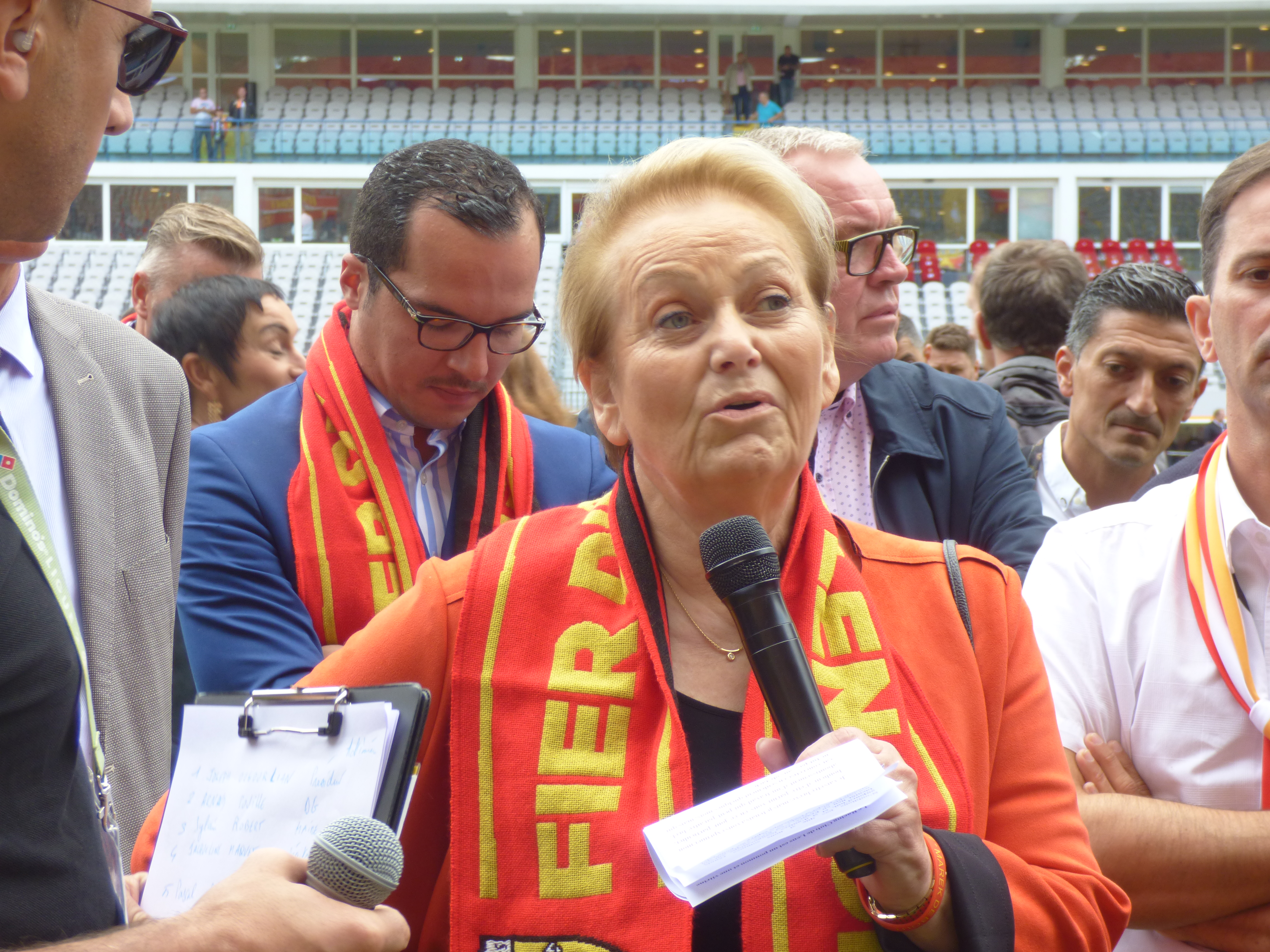
- Maquet in 2018

Member of the National Assembly for Pas-de-Calais's 2nd constituency
- In office 20 June 2012 – 9 June 2024
- Preceded by: Catherine Génisson
- Succeeded by: Agnès Pannier-Runacher

Member of the National Assembly for Pas-de-Calais's 1st constituency
- In office 20 June 2007 – 19 June 2012
- Preceded by: Jean-Pierre Defontaine
- Succeeded by: Jean-Jacques Cottel

Personal details
- Born: 13 May 1949 (age 76)
- Party: Socialist Party (2007-2017); Renaissance (2017–present)

Jacqueline Maquet (born 13 May 1949) is a French politician. She was a member of the National Assembly of France representing Pas-de-Calais 2nd constituency, and is a member of Renaissance. She was formerly a member of the Socialist Party.

== Political career ==
Maquet was elected to the National Assembly as a Socialist Party member representing Pas-de-Calais's 1st constituency in the 2007 French legislative election, succeeding Jean-Pierre Defontaine who had represented the constituency since 1978 for the Radical Party of the Left. She moved to stand in Pas-de-Calais's 2nd constituency for the 2012 French legislative elections and was elected to the vacant seat.

She was re-elected as a candidate for La Republic En Marche! (later Renaissance), the party of French president Emmanuel Macron, in the 2017 and 2022 French legislative elections. She faced allegations of opportunism over her decision to stand as a candidate for La Republic En Marche! in 2017.

Referring to herself as a "left-wing Macronist", she disagreed with the government's controversial pension reform plan that sparked protests and strikes across the country in 2020.

She stood down as a candidate for the 2024 French legislative election.
