= Pas-de-Calais's 1st constituency =

Constituency of the National Assembly of France

1st constituency of the Pas-de-Calais
- inline Constituency of the National Assembly of France

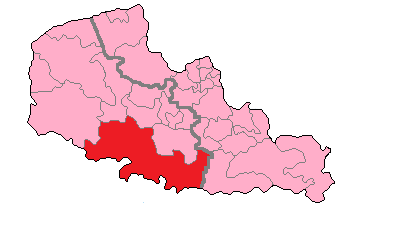
- Pas-de-Calais' 1st constituency shown within Nord-Pas-de-Calais
- Deputy: Emmanuel Blairy; RN
- Department: Pas-de-Calais
- Cantons: Aubigny-en-Artois, Auxi-le-Château, Avesnes-le-Comte, Bapaume, Beaumetz-lès-Loges, Bertincourt, Croisilles, Marquion, Pas-en-Artois, Saint-Pol-sur-Ternoise, Vitry-en-Artois
- Registered voters: 103,081

The 1st constituency of the Pas-de-Calais is a French legislative constituency in the Pas-de-Calais département.

== Description ==
Pas-de-Calais' 1st constituency covers a large rural chunk of the southern part of the department along the border with Picardie.

In the 2010 redistricting of French legislative constituencies, Pas-de-Calais' 2nd constituency was enlarged to include the entire of Arras having previously only contained the north of the city. Jacqueline Maquet who was the deputy for the 1st constituency moved to the 2nd constituency in the 2012 election.

The seat was held by the left from 1988 to 2017.

== Historic Representation ==
| Election | Member | Party |
|---|---|---|
| 1986 | Proportional representation - no election by constituency | |
| 1988 | Jean-Pierre Defontaine | PRG |
| 1993 | Jean-Pierre Defontaine | PRG |
| 1997 | Jean-Pierre Defontaine | PRG |
| 2002 | Jean-Pierre Defontaine | PRG |
| 2007 | Jacqueline Maquet | PS |
| 2012 | Jean-Jacques Cottel | PS |
| 2017 | Bruno Duvergé | MoDem |
| 2022 | Emmanuel Blairy | RN |
| 2024 | Emmanuel Blairy | RN |

== Election results ==
=== 2024 ===
| Candidate | Party | Alliance | First round | | | Second round | | |
| Candidate | Party | Alliance | Votes | % | +/– | Votes | % | +/– |
|---|---|---|---|---|---|---|---|---|
| Emmanuel Blairy | RN | | 38,755 | 54.08 | +18.47 | | | |
| Philippe Bolet | RE | Ensemble | 9,613 | 13.41 | -11.18 | | | |
| Marie Bernard | LR | UDC | 9,026 | 12.59 | -0.06 | | | |
| Jean-Michael Sauvage | LFI | NFP | 6,957 | 9.71 | -5.16 | | | |
| Jean-Jacques Cottel | DVG | | 6,637 | 9.26 | new | | | |
| Marie Berthoud | LO | | 680 | 0.95 | -0.65 | | | |
| Votes | | | 71,668 | 100.00 | | | | |
| Valid votes | | | 71,668 | 97.27 | -0.06 | | | |
| Blank votes | | | 1,295 | 1.76 | +0.01 | | | |
| Null votes | | | 715 | 0.97 | +0.05 | | | |
| Turnout | | | 73,678 | 70.00 | +20.12 | | | |
| Abstentions | | | 31,569 | 30.00 | -20.12 | | | |
| Registered voters | | | 105,247 | | | | | |
| Result | | | RN HOLD | | | | | |

=== 2022 ===
Legislative Election 2022: Pas-de-Calais's 1st constituency
| Party | Candidate | Votes | % | ±% |
|---|---|---|---|---|
| RN | Emmanuel Blairy | 18,153 | 35.61 | +12.23 |
| MoDem (Ensemble) | Bruno Duvergé | 12,396 | 24.32 | -3.34 |
| LFI (NUPÉS) | Eric Cagnache | 7,579 | 14.87 | −13.53 |
| LR (UDC) | Marie Bernard | 6,446 | 12.65 | −3.31 |
| PS | Michel Flahaut | 2,029 | 3.98 | N/A |
| REC | Geoffrey Fournier | 1,888 | 3.70 | N/A |
| Others | N/A | 2,484 | 4.87 | |
| Turnout | | 50,975 | 49.88 | −3.62 |
2nd round result
| RN | Emmanuel Blairy | 27,380 | 55.77 | +9.78 |
| MoDem (Ensemble) | Bruno Duvergé | 21,711 | 44.23 | −9.78 |
| Turnout | | 49,091 | 50.31 | +1.77 |
| RN gain from MoDem | | | | |

=== 2017 ===
| Candidate | Label | First round | | Second round | |
| Candidate | Label | Votes | % | Votes | % |
|---|---|---|---|---|---|
| Bruno Duvergé | MoDem | 15,037 | 27.66 | 24,770 | 54.01 |
| Agnès Caudron | FN | 12,710 | 23.38 | 21,093 | 45.99 |
| Michel Petit | LR | 8,676 | 15.96 | | |
| Jean-Jacques Cottel | PS | 8,415 | 15.48 | | |
| Gabriel Bertein | FI | 5,415 | 9.96 | | |
| Sylvie Joniaux | ECO | 1,179 | 2.17 | | |
| Arnaud Cugier | DLF | 891 | 1.64 | | |
| Maryse Massart | PCF | 429 | 0.79 | | |
| Jean-Paul Wallard | EXG | 358 | 0.66 | | |
| Carine Brabant | DIV | 313 | 0.58 | | |
| Jean-Marc Maurice | EXD | 313 | 0.58 | | |
| Mickaël Decottignies | DVD | 245 | 0.45 | | |
| Jérémy Lautour | EXG | 193 | 0.36 | | |
| Jean-Marie Monka-Octave | DVG | 189 | 0.35 | | |
| Votes | | 54,363 | 100.00 | 45,863 | 100.00 |
| Valid votes | | 54,363 | 97.34 | 45,863 | 90.52 |
| Blank votes | | 1,005 | 1.80 | 3,240 | 6.40 |
| Null votes | | 480 | 0.86 | 1,561 | 3.08 |
| Turnout | | 55,848 | 53.50 | 50,664 | 48.54 |
| Abstentions | | 48,533 | 46.50 | 53,721 | 51.46 |
| Registered voters | | 104,381 | | 104,385 | |
Source: Ministry of the Interior

=== 2012 ===
Legislative Election 2012: Pas-de-Calais's 1st constituency
| Party | Candidate | Votes | % | ±% |
|---|---|---|---|---|
| PS | Jean-Jacques Cottel | 23,196 | 37.26 | +4.90 |
| UMP | Michel Petit | 18,403 | 29.56 | −8.08 |
| FN | Jean-Pierre D'Hollander | 12,081 | 19.40 | +13.69 |
| FG | Xavier Schmidt | 3,420 | 5.49 | +2.70 |
| MoDem | Bruno Duverge | 2,680 | 4.30 | N/A |
| EELV | Serge Ravaux | 1,435 | 2.30 | −0.43 |
| Others | N/A | 1,043 | | |
| Turnout | | 62,258 | 60.39 | −4.31 |
2nd round result
| PS | Jean-Jacques Cottel | 31,658 | 52.59 | +0.50 |
| UMP | Michel Petit | 28,537 | 47.41 | −0.50 |
| Turnout | | 60,195 | 58.40 | −7.40 |
| PS hold | | | | |

=== 2007 ===
Legislative Election 2007: Pas-de-Calais's 1st constituency
| Party | Candidate | Votes | % | ±% |
|---|---|---|---|---|
| UMP | Philippe Rapeneau | 18,908 | 37.64 | |
| PS | Jacqueline Maquet | 16,257 | 32.36 | |
| DVD | Gérard Pavy | 3,886 | 7.74 | |
| FN | Joseph Gabriele | 2,866 | 5.71 | |
| CPNT | Isabelle Carre | 1,631 | 3.25 | |
| Far left | Sigrid Dumoncay | 1,406 | 2.80 | |
| PCF | Jean-Jacques Guillemant | 1,402 | 2.79 | |
| LV | Laura Sanchez | 1,369 | 2.73 | |
| Others | N/A | 2,508 | | |
| Turnout | | 51,657 | 64.70 | |
2nd round result
| PS | Jacqueline Maquet | 26,398 | 52.09 | |
| UMP | Philippe Rapeneau | 24,282 | 47.91 | |
| Turnout | | 52,537 | 65.80 | |
| PS gain from PRG | | | | |

=== 2002 ===
Legislative Election 2002: Pas-de-Calais's 1st constituency
| Party | Candidate | Votes | % | ±% |
|---|---|---|---|---|
| PRG | Jean-Pierre Defontaine | 16,071 | 31.39 | |
| UMP | Philippe Rapeneau | 11,861 | 23.17 | |
| UDF | Denise Bocquillet | 6,146 | 12.01 | |
| FN | Jean-Marc Maurice | 6,064 | 11.85 | |
| CPNT | Isabelle Carre | 2,495 | 4.87 | |
| DVD | Gerard Pavy | 1,895 | 3.70 | |
| LV | Christiane Ducamp | 1,388 | 2.71 | |
| PCF | Michella Jaffre | 1,123 | 2.19 | |
| Others | N/A | 4,148 | | |
| Turnout | | 52,780 | 67.84 | |
2nd round result
| PRG | Jean-Pierre Defontaine | 24,501 | 50.54 | |
| UMP | Philippe Rapeneau | 23,974 | 49.46 | |
| Turnout | | 51,377 | 66.04 | |
| PRG hold | | | | |

=== 1997 ===
Legislative Election 1997: Pas-de-Calais's 1st constituency
| Party | Candidate | Votes | % | ±% |
|---|---|---|---|---|
| PRG | Jean-Pierre Defontaine | 21,438 | 39.53 | |
| RPR | Jean-Marie Presteaux | 11,566 | 21.33 | |
| FN | Patrick Heaulme | 7,061 | 13.02 | |
| PCF | Lucien Capron | 3,952 | 7.29 | |
| DIV | Gérard Pavy | 3,282 | 6.05 | |
| DVD | Hervé Lamoril | 2,382 | 4.39 | |
| LV | Hélène Flautre | 2,322 | 4.28 | |
| DVE | Claudine Lescouf | 1,213 | 2.24 | |
| Others | N/A | 1,013 | | |
| Turnout | | 57,517 | 76.25 | |
2nd round result
| PRG | Jean-Pierre Defontaine | 33,134 | 60.22 | |
| RPR | Jean-Marie Presteaux | 21,888 | 39.78 | |
| Turnout | | 59,032 | 78.26 | |
| PRG hold | | | | |

== Sources ==
- Official results of French elections from 1998: "Résultats électoraux officiels en France" (in French).
