= Political positions of Emmanuel Macron =

Overview of Emmanuel Macron's political positions

Emmanuel Macron, the 25th president of France, positions himself as a liberal and a centrist. The political practice based on the positions and rhetoric of Macron has been colloquially referred to as Macronism (French: Macronisme). When he launched his party En Marche in April 2016, he said that it was "neither right nor left". By March 2017, Macron stated that he and his party were now "both right and left". Prior to the establishment of En Marche, some observers described him as a social liberal, while others called him a social democrat,, as he has been a member of the Socialist Party. During his time in the Socialist Party, he supported the party's centrist wing, whose political stance has been associated with Third Way policies advanced by Bill Clinton, Tony Blair, and Gerhard Schröder, and whose leading spokesman has been former prime minister Manuel Valls.

Macron is accused by some members of the yellow vest movement of being an "ultra-liberal president for the rich". Macron was dubbed the "president of the very rich" by former Socialist French president François Hollande. In the past, Macron called himself a "socialist"; since August 2015, he labelled himself as a "centrist liberal", refusing observations by critics that he is an "ultra-liberal" economically. During a visit to Vendée in August 2016, he said that he was not a socialist and merely served in a "left-leaning government". He has called himself both a "man of the left" and "liberal" in his book Révolution. Macron has since been labelled an economic neoliberal with a socio-cultural liberal viewpoint.

Macron created the centrist political party En Marche in an attempt to create a party that could cross partisan lines. Speaking on why he formed En Marche, he said there is a real divide in France between "conservatives and progressives". His political platform during the 2017 French presidential election contained stances from both the left and right, which led to him being positioned as a radical centrist by Le Figaro. Macron rejected centrist as a label, although political scientist Luc Rouban compared his platform to former centrist president Valéry Giscard d'Estaing, who is the only other French president to have been elected on a centrist platform.

Macron has been compared to Giscard d'Estaing due to their ability to win a presidential election on a centrist platform and for their similar governing styles. Both were inspectors of finance, were given responsibilities based around tax and revenue, both were very ambitious about running for the position of president, showing their keenness early in their careers, and both were seen as figures of renewal in French political life. In 2016, d'Estaing said himself that he was "a little like Macron". Observers have noted that while they are alike ideologically, d'Estaing had ministerial experience and time in Parliament to show for his political life while Macron had never been elected before.

== Economy ==
Macron has advocated in favour of the free market and reducing the public-finances deficit. He first publicly used the word liberal to describe himself in a 2015 interview with Le Monde. He added that he is "neither right nor left" and that he advocates a "collective solidarity". During a visit to the Puy du Fou in Vendée with Philippe de Villiers in August 2016, he stated: "Honesty compels me to say that I am not a socialist." Macron explained that he was part of the "left government" because he wanted to "serve the public interest" as any minister would. In his book Révolution, published in November 2016, Macron presents himself as both a "leftist" and a "liberal ... if by liberalism one means trust in man".

With his party En Marche, Macron's stated aim is to transcend the left–right divide in a manner similar to that of François Bayrou or Jacques Chaban-Delmas, asserting that "the real divide in our country ... is between progressives and conservatives". With the launch of his independent candidacy and his use of anti-establishment rhetoric, Macron has been labelled a populist by some observers, notably Valls, but Macron has rejected this term.

Macron is a supporter of the El Khomri law. He became the most vocal proponent of the economic overhaul of the country. Macron has stated that he wants to go further than the El Khomri law in reforming the labour code.

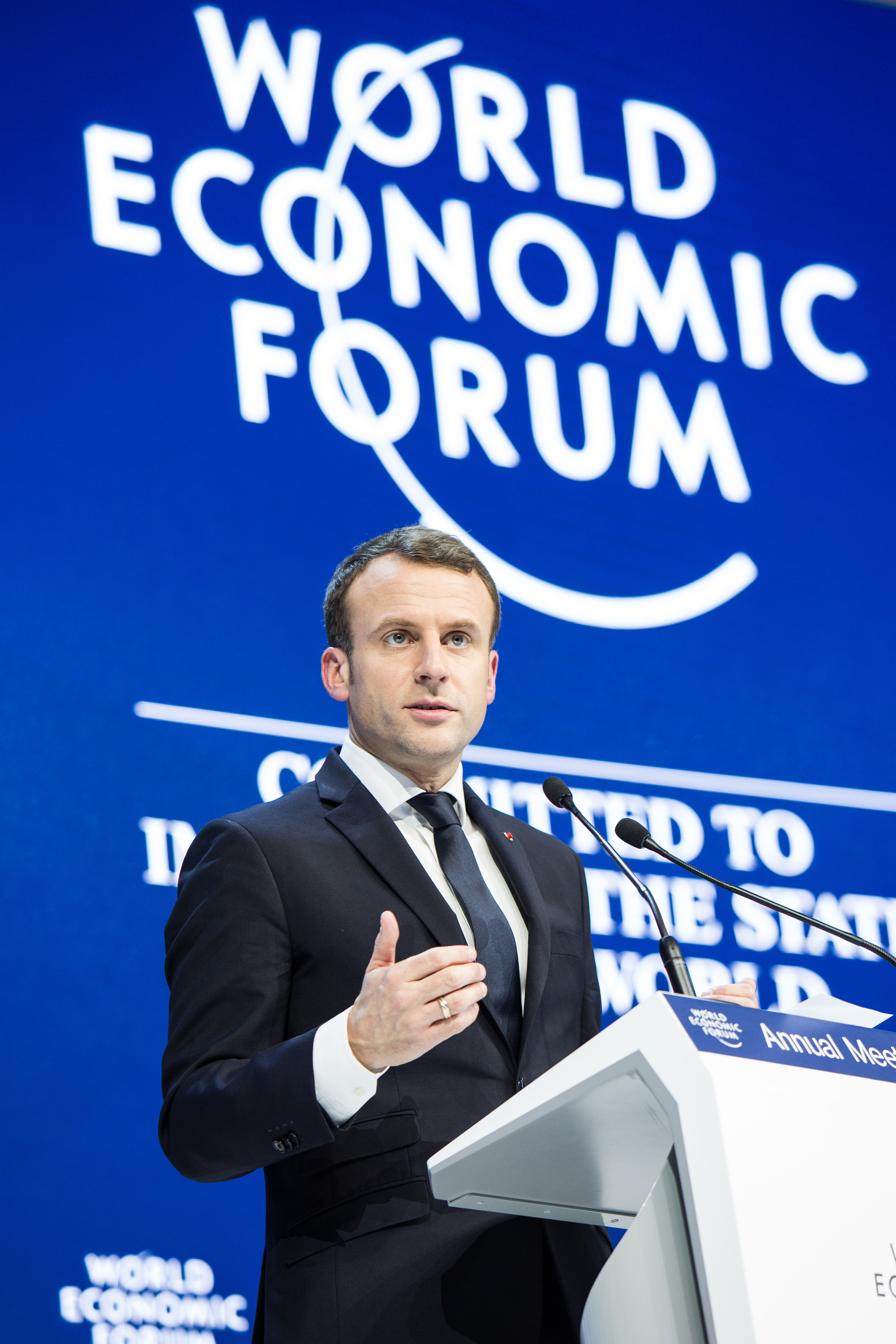
Macron addressing the World Economic Forum 2018 in Davos, Switzerland

Macron is in favour of tax cuts. During the 2017 presidential election, Macron proposed cutting the corporate tax rate from 33.3% to 25%. Macron also wanted to remove investment income from the wealth tax so that it is solely a tax on high-value property. Macron also wanted to exempt 18 million households from local residence tax, branding the tax as "unfair" during his 2017 presidential campaign.

Macron is against raising taxes on the highest earners. When asked about François Hollande's proposal to raise income tax on the upper class to 75%, Macron compared the policy to the Cuban taxation system. Macron supports stopping tax avoidance.

On 8 June 2021, Macron was slapped in the face during a visit to the town of Tain-l'Hermitage. The attacker was identified as Damien Tarel, who stated that he was associated with the yellow vest movement and the far-right, though he was also described as an "ideological mush". Tarel was sentenced to four months of imprisonment plus a suspended sentence of fourteen months.

Macron has advocated for the end of the 35-hour work week; however, his view has changed over time and he now seeks reforms that aim to preserve the 35-hour work week while increasing France's competitiveness. He has said that he wants to return flexibility to companies without ending the 35-hour work week. This would include companies renegotiating work hours and overtime payments with employees.

Macron has supported cutting the number of civil servants by 120,000. Macron also supports spending cuts, saying he would cut 60 billion euros in public spending over a span of five years.

He has supported the Comprehensive Economic and Trade Agreement (CETA) between Canada and the European Union and criticized the Walloon government for trying to block it. He believes that CETA should not require the endorsement of national parliaments because "it undermines the EU". Macron supports the idea of the Eurozone having a common budget.

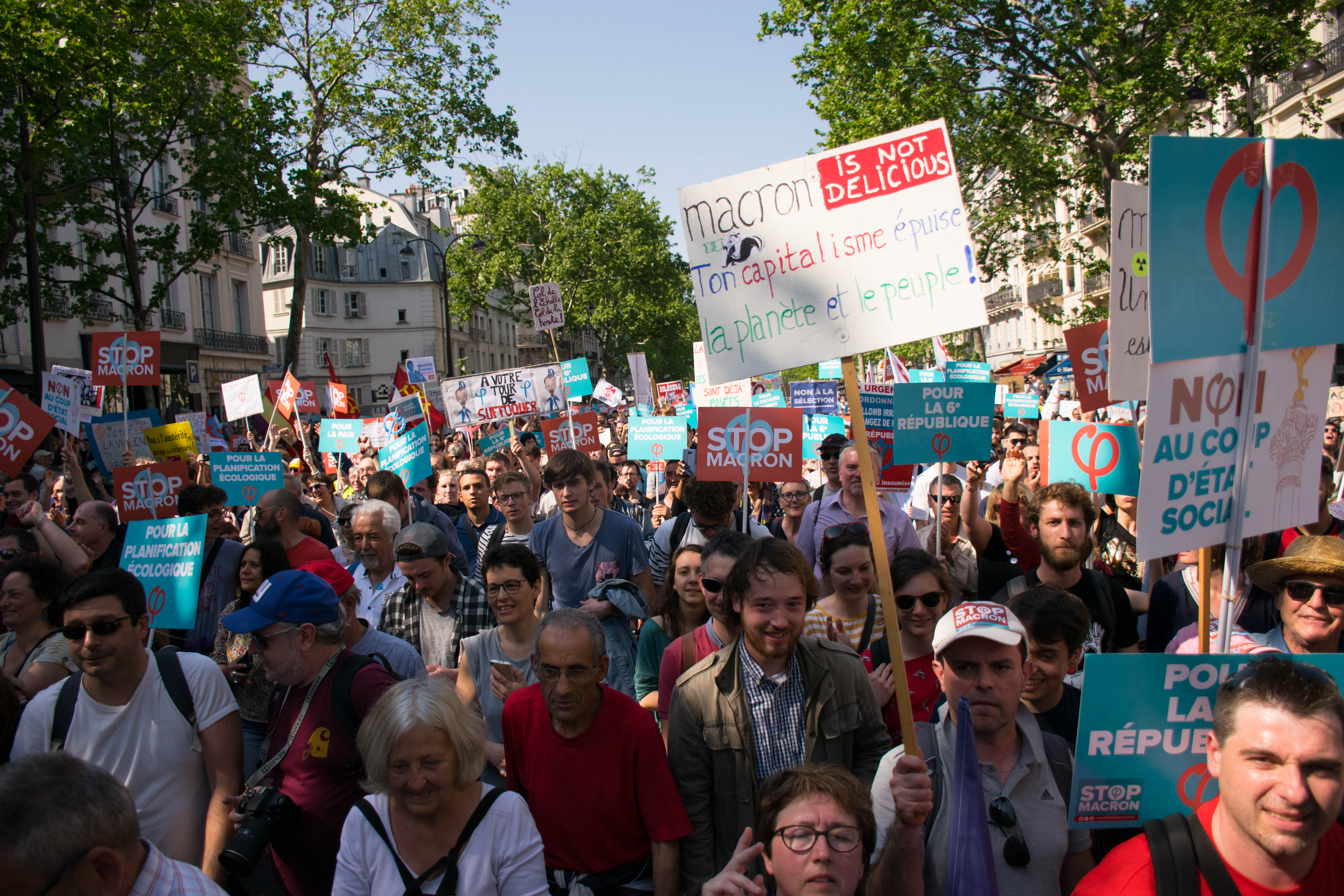
Protest against President Macron and his economic policies in Paris on 5 May 2018

Regarding the Transatlantic Trade and Investment Partnership (TTIP), Macron stated in June 2016 that "the conditions [to sign the treaty] are not met", adding that "we mustn't close the door entirely" and "need a strong link with the US".

In April 2017, Macron called for a "rebalancing" of Germany's trade surplus, saying that "Germany benefits from the imbalances within the Eurozone and achieves very high trade surpluses".

In March 2018, Macron announced that the government would spend 1.5 billion euros ($1.9 billion) on artificial intelligence to boost innovation. The money would be used to sponsor research projects and scientific laboratories, as well as to finance startup companies whose focus is AI within the country.

== Foreign policy ==
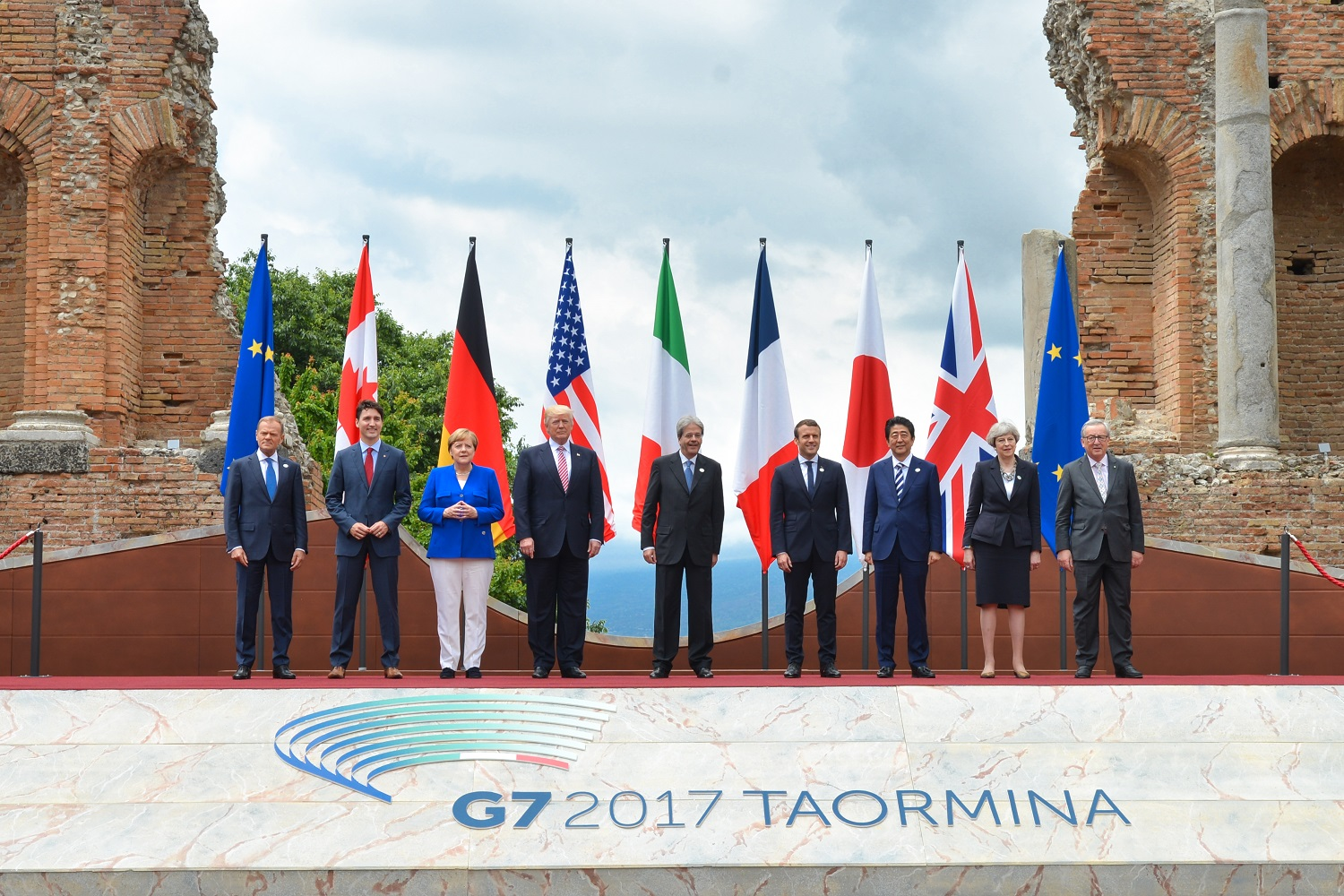
The G7 leaders, 26 May 2017

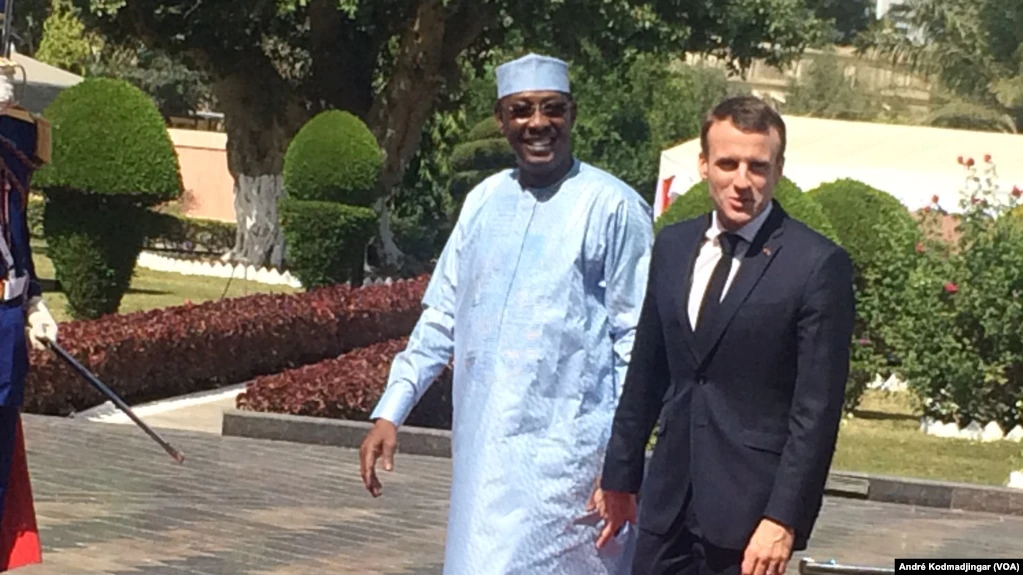
Macron with Chadian president Idriss Déby in N'Djamena, December 2018

=== Algeria ===
In 2017, Macron described France's colonization of Algeria as a "crime against humanity". He also said: "It's truly barbarous and it's part of a past that we need to confront by apologizing to those against whom we committed these acts." Polls following his remarks reflected a decrease in his support. In January 2021, Macron stated there would be "no repentance nor apologies" for the French colonization of Algeria, colonial abuses or French involvement during the Algerian independence war. Instead efforts would be devoted toward reconciliation.

=== Libya ===
Macron described the 2011 military intervention in Libya as a "historic error".

=== Middle East ===
In January 2017, he said France needed a more "balanced" policy toward Syria, including talks with Bashar al-Assad. In April 2017, following the chemical attack in Khan Shaykhun, Macron proposed a possible military intervention against the Assad regime, preferably under United Nations auspices. He has warned if the Syrian regime uses chemical weapons during his presidency he will act unilaterally to punish it.

He supported the continuation of President Hollande's policies on Israel, opposed the BDS movement, and refused to state a position on recognition of the State of Palestine during his first term. In May 2018, Macron condemned "the violence of Israeli armed forces" against Palestinians in Gaza border protests. However, in October 2023, he announced proposals "to prevent an escalation, free hostages, guarantee Israel's security and work towards a two-state solution". In July 2025 he announced that by September 2025 he would include France in the number of countries which recognise a Palestinian state.

In response to the Turkish invasion of northern Syria aimed at ousting U.S.-backed Syrian Kurds from the enclave of Afrin, Macron said that Turkey must respect Syria's sovereignty, despite his condemnation of Bashar al-Assad.

Macron has voiced support for the Saudi Arabian-led military campaign against Yemen's Shiite rebels. He also defended France's arms sales to the Saudi-led coalition. Some rights groups have argued that France is violating national and international law by selling weapons to members of the Saudi-led coalition fighting in Yemen.

=== North Korea ===
Macron has called for a peaceful solution during the 2017 North Korea crisis, though he agreed to work with US President Trump against North Korea. Macron and Trump apparently conducted a phone call on 12 August 2017 where they discussed confronting North Korea, denuclearizing the Korean Peninsula and enforcing new sanctions.

=== Myanmar ===
Macron condemned the persecution of Rohingya Muslims in Myanmar. He described the situation as "genocide" and "ethnic purification", and alluded to the prospect of UN-led intervention.

=== China ===
In response to the death of Chinese Nobel Peace Prize laureate Liu Xiaobo, who died of organ failure while in government custody, Macron praised Liu as "a freedom fighter". Macron also described as "extremely fruitful and positive" his first contacts with General Secretary of the Chinese Communist Party Xi Jinping. His foreign approach was described as neo-gaullist.

=== Armenia ===
In 2019, Macron announced that France would designate April 24 as a national day of remembrance for the Armenian genocide. After the 2020 Nagorno-Karabakh war, Macron pledged to supply defense equipment to Armenia, as well as humanitarian aid of 29 million euros to displaced Armenians from Nagorno-Karabakh. He is also in support of the International Court of Justice's decision on November 17, 2023, of which calls on the rights of ethnic Armenian residents to return safely to their homeland.

=== Turkey ===
Macron expressed concerns over Turkey's "rash and dangerous" statements regarding the 2020 Nagorno-Karabakh war between the armed forces of Azerbaijan and Armenia, further stating that he was "extremely concerned by the warlike messages". He also said: "A red line has been crossed, which is unacceptable. I urge all NATO partners to face up to the behaviour of a NATO member."

=== European Union ===
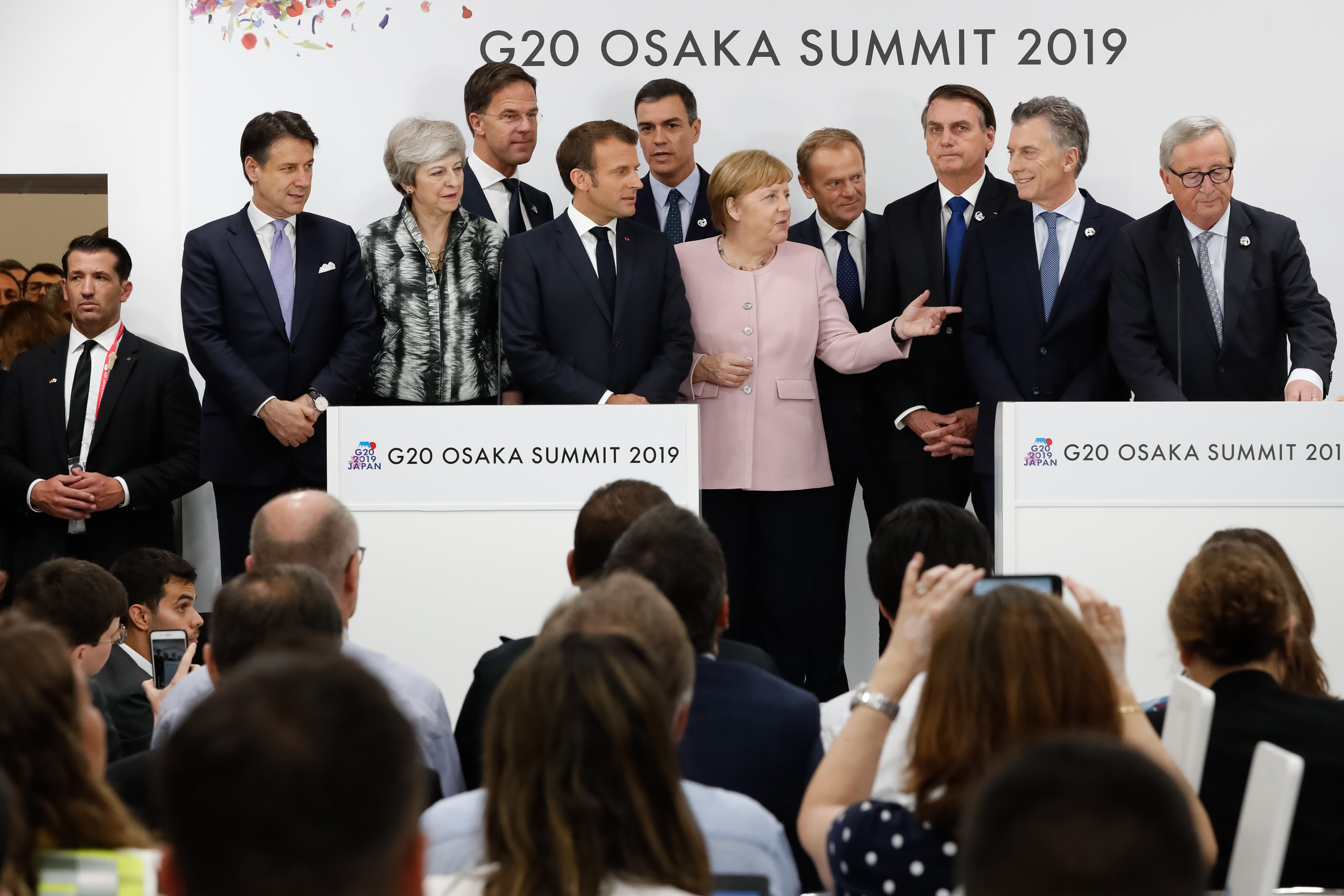
In June 2019, representatives of EU and Mercosur announced they had reached an EU–Mercosur Free Trade Agreement

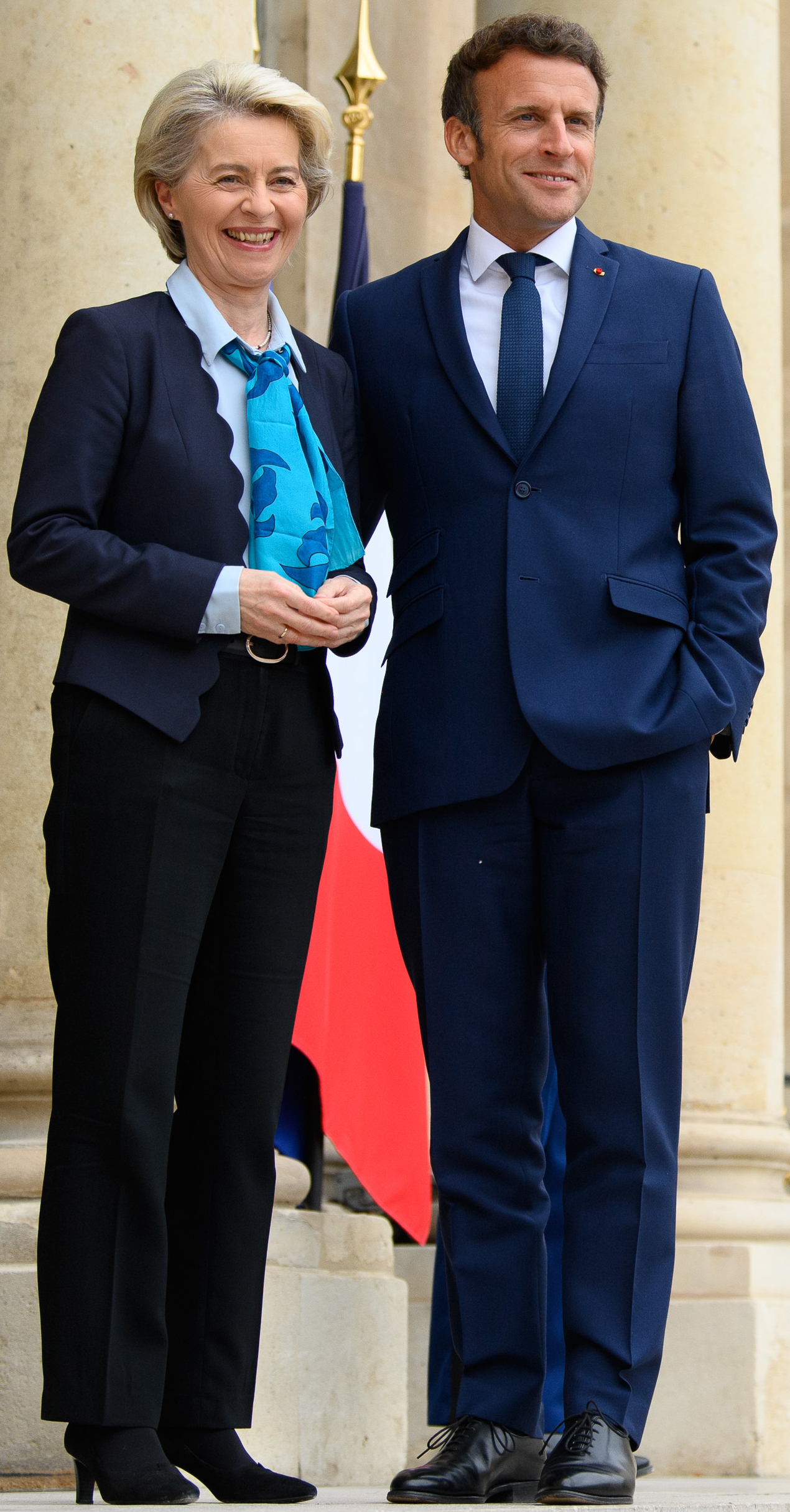
Macron with President of the European Commission Ursula von der Leyen in Paris, 3 June 2022

An article in the New York Times described Emmanuel Macron as "ardently pro-Europe" and stated that he "has proudly embraced an unpopular European Union."

Macron has been described by some as Europhile and federalist but he describes himself as "neither pro-European, eurosceptic nor a federalist in the classical sense", and his party as "the only pro-European political force in France".

In June 2015, Macron and his German counterpart Sigmar Gabriel published a platform advocating a continuation of European integration. They advocated the continuation "of structural reforms (such as labor markets), institutional reforms (including the area of economic governance)."

He also advocated the creation of a post of EU Commissioner that would be responsible for the Eurozone and the Eurozone's Parliament and common budget.

In addition, Macron stated: "I'm in favour of strengthening anti-dumping measures which have to be faster and more powerful like those in the United States. We also need to establish a monitoring of foreign investments in strategic sectors at the EU level in order to protect a vital industry and to ensure our sovereignty and the European superiority." Macron also stated that, if elected, he would seek to renegotiate the Treaty of Le Touquet with the United Kingdom which has caused a build-up of economic migrants in Calais. When Macron served as economy minister he had suggested the Treaty could be scrapped if the UK left the European Union.

On 1 May 2017, Macron said the EU needed to reform or face Frexit. On 26 September, he unveiled his proposals for the EU, intending to deepen the bloc politically and harmonize its rules. He argued for institutional changes, initiatives to promote EU, along with new ventures in the technology, defence and energy sectors. His proposals also included setting up a rapid reaction force working along with national armies while establishing a finance minister, budget and parliament for the Eurozone. He also called for a new tax on technology giants, an EU-wide asylum agency to deal with the refugee crisis, and changes to the Common Agricultural Policy.

On 16 June 2017, after meeting with Spanish Prime Minister Mariano Rajoy in Madrid, Macron stated, about 2017 Catalan independence referendum that "my partner and friend is all of Spain and my interlocutor is Mariano Rajoy". Following the referendum on 1 October and the favorable outcome for independence, Macron called Rajoy to convey his commitment to the "constitutional unity of Spain". On 10 October, the same day that Catalan President Carles Puigdemont suspended the declaration of independence, Macron flatly rejected a possible European mediation of the constitutional crisis and called for a peaceful resolution. Following the declaration of independence by Catalonia on 27 October, Macron joined the EU in supporting Spanish prime minister Mariano Rajoy.

In a conversation with BBC's Andrew Marr, Macron stated that theoretically if France should choose to withdraw from the EU, it would do so through a national popular vote. In November 2019, Macron blocked EU accession talks with Albania and North Macedonia, proposing changes to the EU Enlargement policy. In an interview with The Economist, Macron said that the EU was too reliant on NATO and the US, and that it should initiate "strategic dialogue" with Russia.

After the European elections in 2019, it was Macron in particular who prevented the leading candidate of the European People's Party, Manfred Weber, from becoming president of the European Commission. Previously it had been a tradition that the top candidate of the largest party always took over this post. Critics accused Macron of having by his actions ignored the democratic decision of the voters for political reasons, sacrificing democratic principles for his own interests.

=== Greece ===
In July 2015, as economy minister, Macron stated in an interview that any bailout package for Greece must also ease its burden by including reductions in the country's overall debt. In July 2015, while challenging the "loaded question" of the 2015 Greek referendum, Macron called for resisting the "automatic ejection" of Greece from the Eurozone and avoiding "the Versailles Treaty of the Eurozone", in which case the "No" side would win. He believed that the Greek and European leaders co-produced the Greek government-debt crisis, and that the agreement reached in summer 2015 between Greece and its creditors, notably driven by François Hollande, would not help Greece deal with its debt, and at the same time criticized the International Monetary Fund.

In June 2016, he criticized the austerity policies imposed on Greece as unsustainable, and called for the joint establishment of "fiscal and financial solidarity mechanisms" and a mechanism for restructuring the debt of Eurozone member states. Yanis Varoufakis, minister of finance in the First Cabinet of Alexis Tsipras, praised Macron, calling him "the only French Minister in the François Hollande's administration that seemed to understand what was at stake in the Eurozone" and who, according to him, "tried to play the intermediary between us [Greece] and the troika of our creditors, the EC, IMF, ECB even if they don't allow him to play the role".

==== Others ====
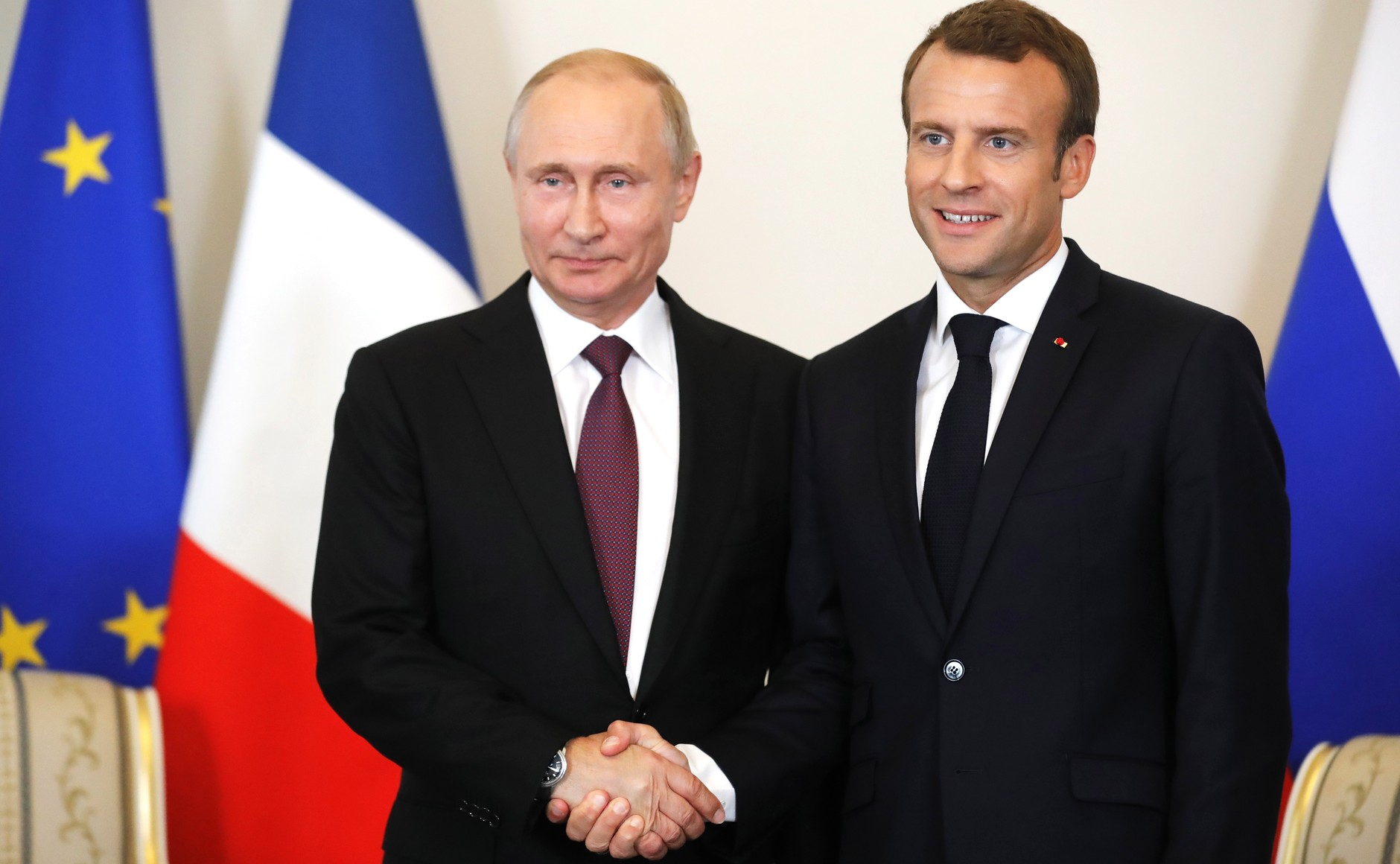
Macron with Russian President Vladimir Putin at the St. Petersburg International Economic Forum on 24 May 2018

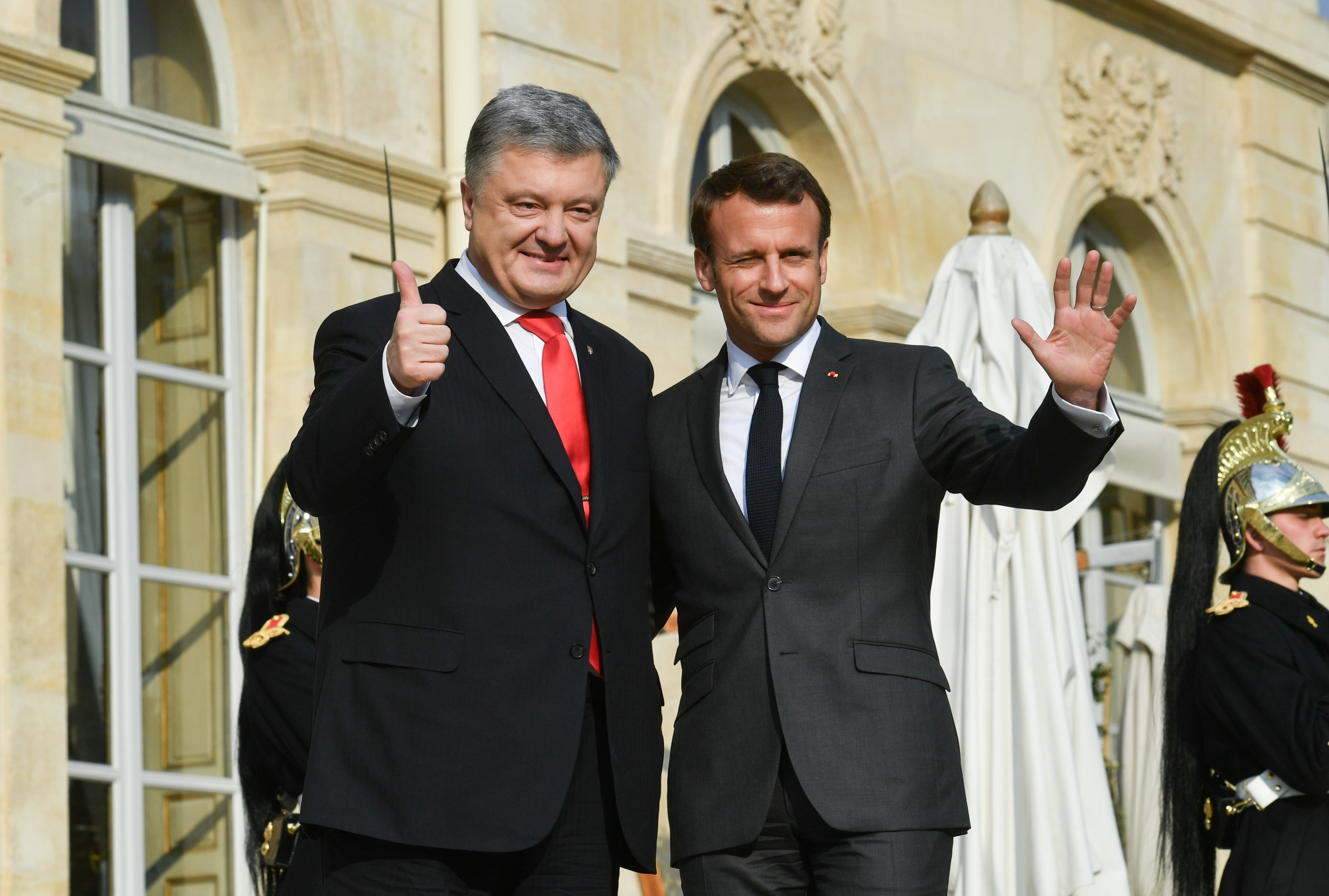
Macron with Ukrainian President Petro Poroshenko in Paris, 12 April 2019

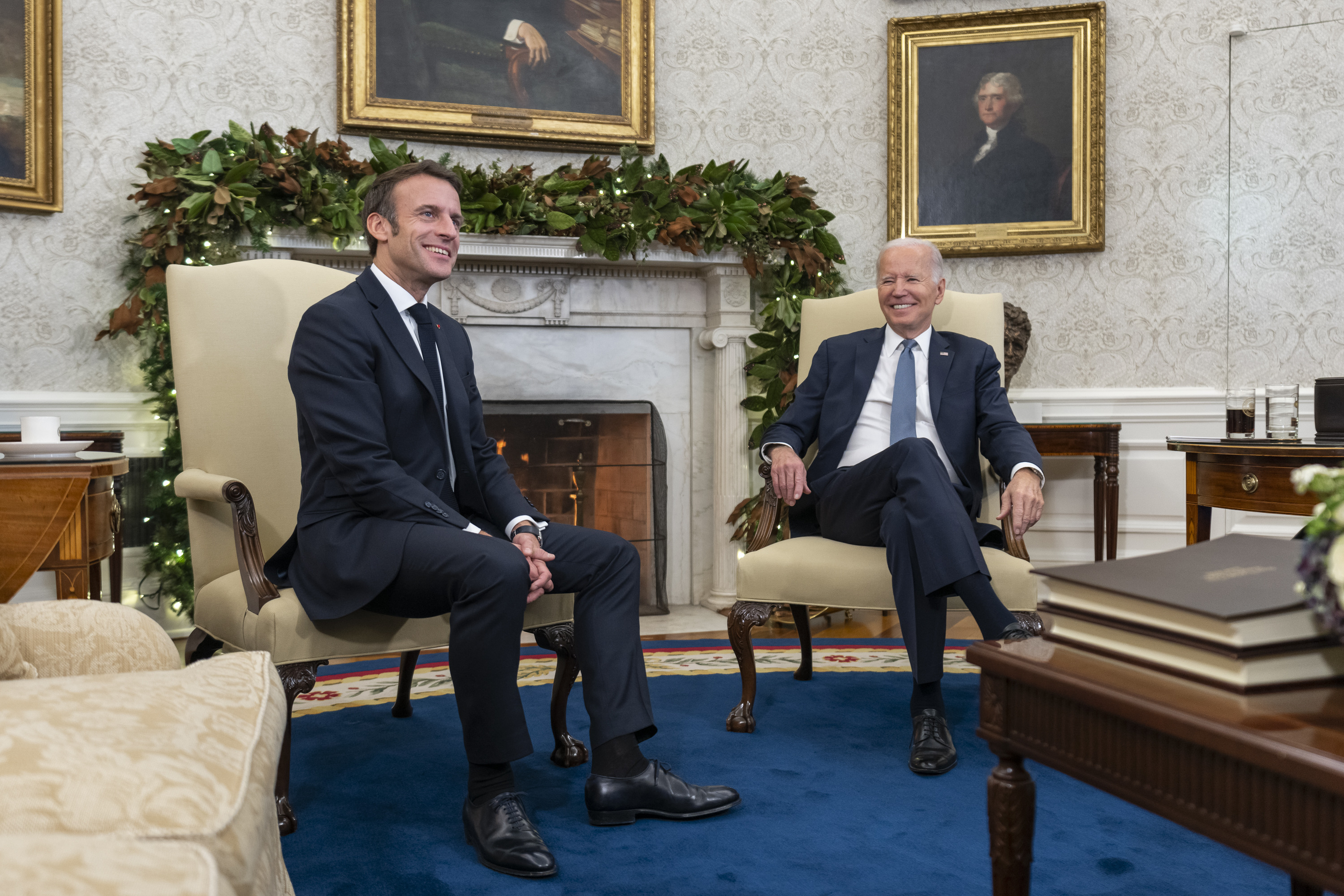
Macron with U.S. President Joe Biden in Washington, D.C., 1 December 2022

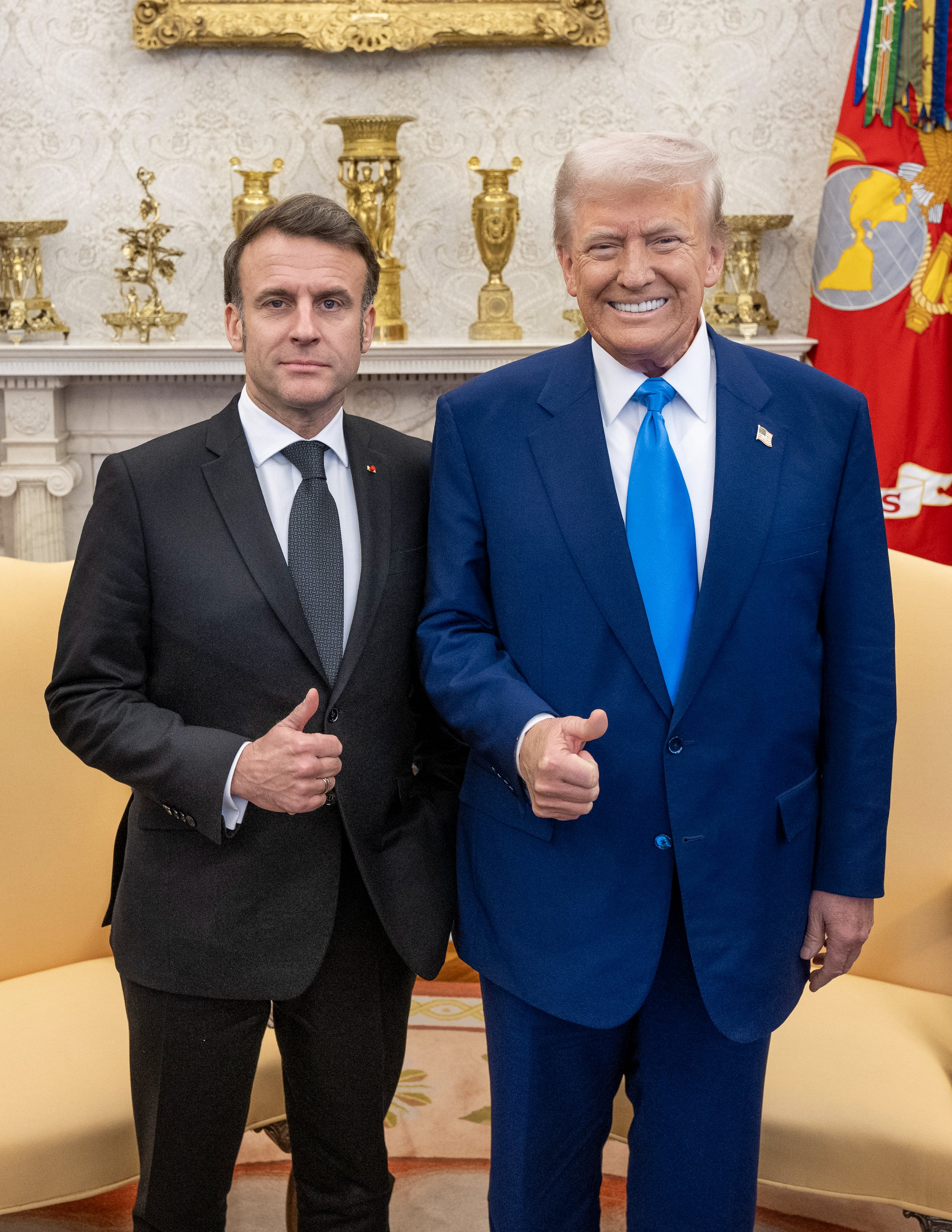
Macron with U.S. President Donald Trump at the White House, Washington, D.C., 24 February 2025

In 2012, Macron was a Young Leader with the French-American Foundation. He criticized the Franco-Swiss construction firm LafargeHolcim for competing to build the wall on the Mexico–United States border promised by U.S. President Donald Trump.

President Macron has supported NATO and its role in the security of eastern European states and also pressure on NATO partners like Poland to uphold what he called "European values". He said in April 2017 that "in the three months after I'm elected, there will be a decision on Poland. You cannot have a European Union which argues over every single decimal place on the issue of budgets with each country, and which, when you have an EU member which acts like Poland or Hungary on issues linked to universities and learning, or refugees, or fundamental values, decides to do nothing." Polish Foreign Minister Witold Waszczykowski said in response that Macron "violated European standards and the principles of friendship with Poland".

During a press conference with Vladimir Putin at the Palace of Versailles in May 2017, he condemned the Russian state media as "lying propaganda". The same month, he said: "we all know who Le Pen's allies are. The regimes of Orbán, Kaczyński, Putin. These aren't the regimes with an open and free democracy. Every day they break many democratic freedoms."

Macron has said that the European Commission needs to do more to stop the influx of low-paid temporary workers from Central and Eastern Europe into France.

=== Immigration ===
Macron supported the open-door policy toward migrants from the Middle East and Africa pursued by Angela Merkel in Germany during the 2017 election campaign and promoted tolerance towards immigrants and Muslims. Macron expressed confidence in France's ability to absorb more immigrants and welcomed their arrival into Europe, asserting that the influx will have a positive economic impact. However, he later stated that France could "not hold everyone" and cited migration as a major concern of voters. New migration measures were introduced which toughened controls on asylum and fixed quotas for foreign workers.

However, he believes that Frontex (the European Border and Coast Guard Agency) is "not a sufficiently ambitious program" and has called for more investment in coast and border guards, "because anyone who enters [Europe] at Lampedusa or elsewhere is a concern for all European countries".

In June 2018 the Aquarius (NGO ship) carrying 629 migrants rescued near Libya was denied entry to Sicilian ports by Italy's new interior minister Matteo Salvini. Italian PM Giuseppe Conte accused France of hypocrisy after Macron said Italy was acting "irresponsibly" by refusing entry to migrants and suggested it had violated international maritime law. Italy's deputy PM Luigi Di Maio said: "I am happy the French have discovered responsibility . . . they should open their ports and we will send a few people to France."

In advance of the 2024 French legislative election, Macron denounced the New Popular Front for its "totally immigrationist" program which he alleged would "abolish all laws controlling immigration" in the event of victory.

=== Security and terrorism ===
Macron believed that the proposed reform bill on deprivation of citizenship for French-born and naturalized citizens convicted on terrorism charges was not a "concrete solution" and believed that "the endless prolongation of the state of emergency raises legitimate questions". He advocated an increase in state funding of intelligence agencies.

Macron called for a restoration of community policing and considered that "the management of some major risks must be delegated to the associations or the private sector".

He considered that his proposal to provide each young adult a "Culture Pass" of €500 might encourage young people to discover the culture of France and deter terrorism.

Macron has endorsed proposals to make it mandatory for Internet companies to allow the government to access encrypted communications from customers.

Macron expressed deep regret at US President Trump's decision to withdraw U.S. armed forces from Syria.

In October 2019, Macron warned that Turkey would be responsible for helping the Islamic State to re-establish a Caliphate in Syria as he called on Turkey to stop its military offensive against Kurdish forces in the north of Syria.

== Environment ==
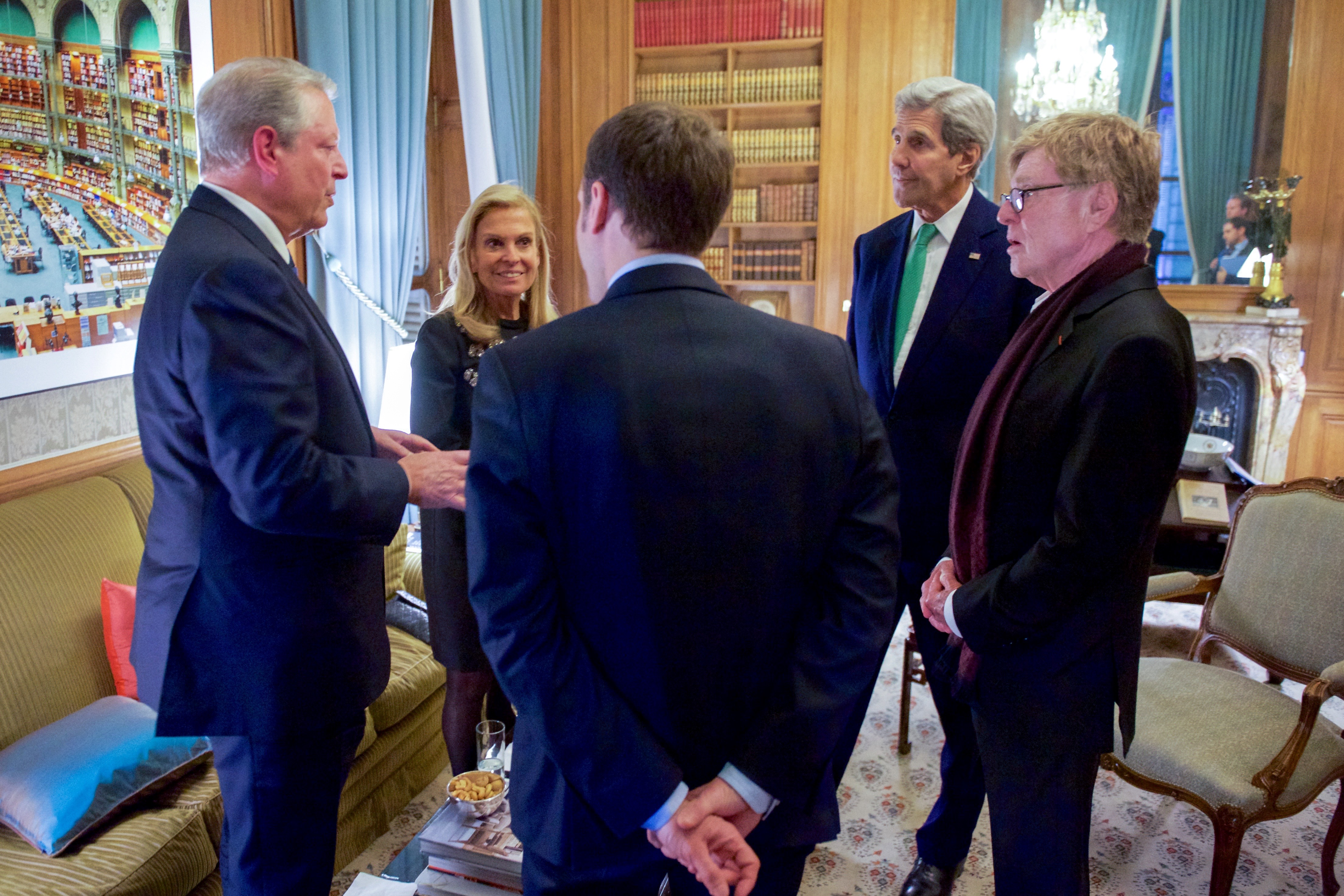
Macron with U.S. Secretary of State John Kerry, former U.S. Vice President Al Gore, Ambassador Jane Hartley and actor Robert Redford at the U.S. Ambassador's residence in Paris, 7 December 2015 amid the COP21 Climate Summit

Ahead of the 2015 United Nations Climate Change Conference, Macron called for acceleration of the ecological transition and advocated a "balance between ecological imperatives and economic requirements", an objective that the French government sought to achieve by fighting on "five fronts": "innovation", "simplification", "strengthening of our energy efficiency and [...] reduction of fossil fuel usage", "energy competitiveness" and "action in Europe and worldwide".

During the summer of 2016 in the aftermath of the Volkswagen emissions scandal, Macron, then Minister of the Economy, defended the use of diesel fuel, which he said was "at the heart of the French industrial policy". His position was criticized by several Socialists, including Paris mayor Anne Hidalgo. Macron also promoted using nuclear energy, which he considered "a French choice and a choice for the future". Nevertheless, in 2018, he committed to a policy of reducing the use of nuclear energy to 50% of the energy sources in France by 2035.

In 2016, Macron proposed that France "secures its supplies in the most strategic materials using three levers: the circular economy and the recovery of materials contained in the end of life of the products [...]; the diversification of supplies to overcome geopolitical risks [...] and to bring more competitiveness; the creation of new reasonably-sized mines in France, while following the best social and environmental standards".

Although he was sceptical about the construction of the Aéroport du Grand Ouest, Macron stated he believed the construction should start, since the people backed the project in the 2016 local referendum. However, after Macron's inauguration, Prime Minister Philippe said that plans for construction would be abandoned. He criticized Donald Trump for pulling the United States out of the Paris climate accord on 2 June 2017, and called for scientists to come to France to work together on climate change. On 19 September 2017, he launched a summit on the margins of the 72nd United Nations General Assembly to call for the adoption of a Global Pact for the Environment.

In 2018, Macron announced that France would commit €700 million to the International Solar Alliance, a treaty-based alliance to expand solar power infrastructure. The same year, Macron announced that France would phase out coal power, with the target of shutting down all coal-fired power stations (which make up about 1% of French energy generation) by 2021.

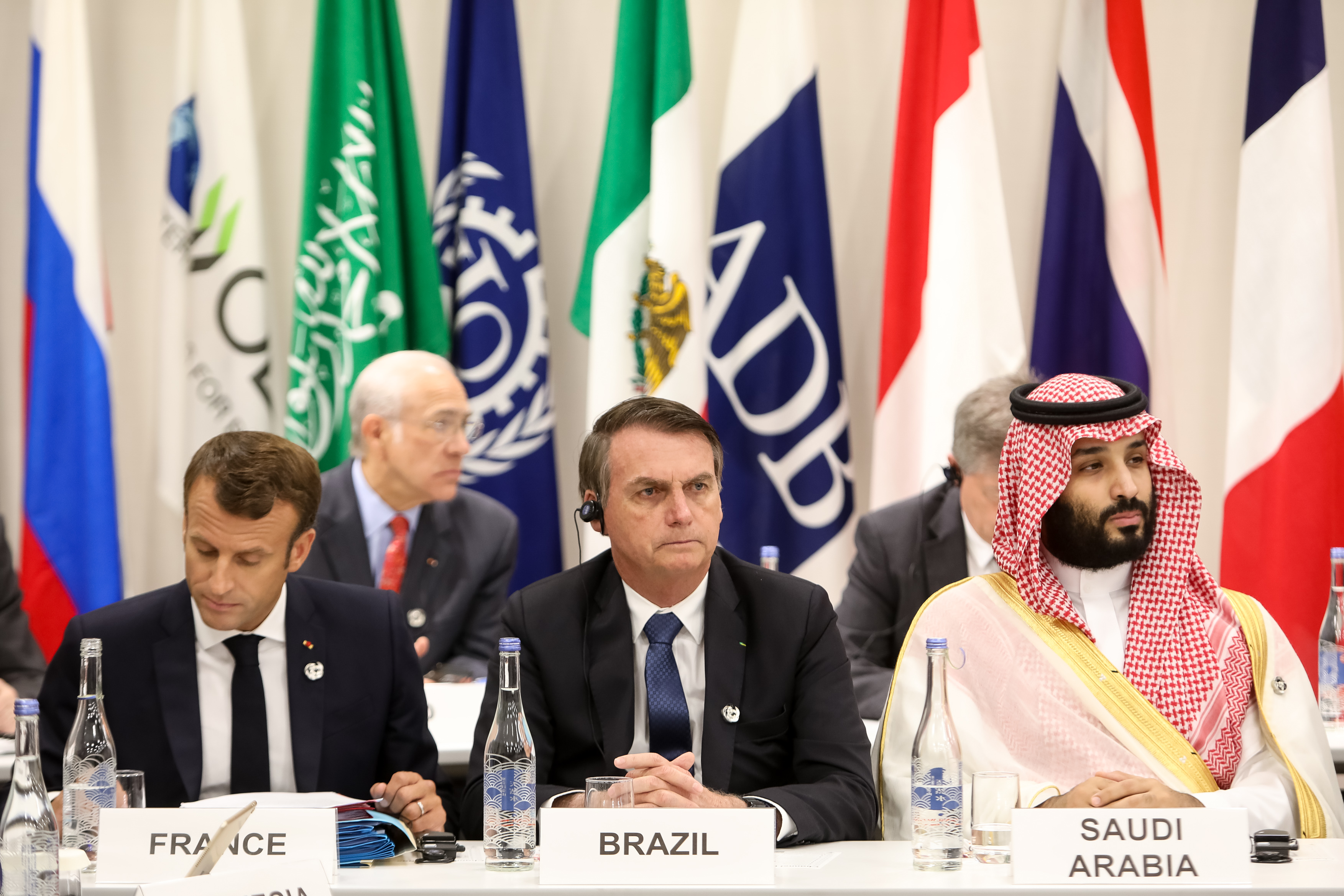
Macron, Brazilian president Jair Bolsonaro and Saudi crown prince Mohammad bin Salman at the 2019 G20 Osaka summit

In 2018, he pursued a petrol tax, albeit the tax stems from an earlier policy under his predecessor, François Hollande. A burgeoning grassroots movement, the yellow vests protests developed throughout France in November and December, extending even to the overseas territory of Réunion. On 4 December, Prime minister Édouard Philippe announced that the tax increase would be pushed back six months. The following day however, Macron scrapped the fuel tax increase altogether.

On 13 January 2019, he penned a 2,300-word letter addressing the nation in response to nine consecutive weeks of protests by the yellow vests movement, calling for three months of national debate to address grievances.

Macron called the 2019 Brazil wildfires an "international crisis" as the Amazon rainforest produces "20% of the world's oxygen". Macron stated he will refuse to ratify the EU–Mercosur Free Trade Agreement unless Brazil commits to protecting the environment.

Macron publicly supports ecocide being made a crime at the International Criminal Court. In 2021 the French government passed the Climate and Resilience Law, making "the most serious cases of environmental damage at national level" a crime.

== Secularism ==
Macron supports the principle of secularism (laïcité). He also said that "we have a duty to let everybody practice their religion with dignity". In July 2016, at the first meeting of En Marche, Macron expressed opposition to banning Muslim headscarves in universities, stating, "Personally, I do not believe we should be inventing new texts, new laws, new standards, in order to hunt down veils at universities and go after people who wear religious symbols during field trips."

In an interview with the French news magazine Marianne, Macron asserted that "secularism is not designed to promote a republican religion", and responded to comments by Valls and Jean-Pierre Chevènement regarding the practice of Islam in French society by condemning the notion that citizens should be "discreet" in their religious practice, stating that "historical precedents when we asked for discretion in matters of religion did not bring honor to the Republic."

In the same interview, Macron said of French Muslims, "I ask one thing: absolutely respect the rules while in public. Religious relationships are about transcendence, and I am not asking people to be moderate – that's not what I'm arguing. My own deep conviction is that a practising Catholic may believe that the laws of his religion go far beyond the laws of the Republic. I simply believe that when one enters the public realm, the laws of the Republic must prevail over religious law." He also condemned "religious schools that teach hatred towards the Republic, with instruction mainly in Arabic or, in other instances, which teach the Torah more than basic fundamentals." This statement triggered an intense negative reaction from the Fonds Social Juif Unifié (FSJU), an organization that runs Jewish religious schools in France.

On 2 October 2020, he unveiled a plan to defend France's secular values against what he termed as "Islamist radicalism", saying the religion was "in crisis" all over the world, prompting a backlash from Muslim activists. He announced that the government would present a bill in December to strengthen a 1905 law that officially separated church and state in France. Macron faced further backlash when after the murder of Samuel Paty, he defended the caricatures of Muhammad by Charlie Hebdo. Many Muslims called for French products to be boycotted in their countries, while European leaders supported his remarks.

== Islamic extremism ==
On 17 October 2023, after the Arras school stabbing and the Brussels shooting, carried out by Islamists in France and Belgium respectively, Macron stated that "Europe is seeing a rise of 'Islamist terrorism' and all states are threatened".

== Healthcare ==
In 2016 Macron supported stopping what he calls the "compartmentalisation of healthcare" by allowing private practitioners into public hospitals. Macron also supported investing money in medical science to develop new technology and find better ways to treat patients.

In 2017 Macron advocated for national health insurance covering optical, hearing and dental care. According to Les Echos, extending national health insurance coverage to optics, hearing and dental care would cost €4.4 billion a year.

== LGBT+ rights ==
In an interview published on 16 February 2017, Macron indicated that he was disappointed by the "humiliation" experienced by opponents of legalisation of same-sex marriage at the hands of La Manif pour tous during the push for passage of Law 2013-404. In a subsequent interview with Têtu in its edition of 28 February 2017, he said the law was both "desirable and necessary" but that the debate "fractured French society," and also denied allegations of a relationship with Mathieu Gallet, saying "if I'd been homosexual, I'd say so and I'd live it." In the same interview, he refused to announce his support for surrogacy but reiterated that he did support assisted reproductive technology for lesbian couples, which in an interview with Elle published on 8 May 2024 he announced plans to reduce waiting times for, while still maintaining his opposition to surrogacy, arguing that "it is not compatible with the dignity of women, it's a form of commodification of their bodies."

In 2022 Macron announced his support for proposals to make it easier for transgender people to change their legal gender, saying that "the people who embark on a transition process must be respected in their choices and their lives must not be made more complex by administrative procedures if useless." In 2024 Macron denounced the New Popular Front's proposals to make changing one's civil status easier by saying their program would include "completely absurd things like changing your gender at the town hall," comments for which he immediately faced criticism from LGBT+ rights organisations.

== Education ==
Macron supported giving more autonomy to schools and universities. Macron wanted to create a programme to make schools pay experienced teachers higher salaries and give them more educational freedom.

Macron wanted to combat the issue of income inequality in schools by attempting to improve working-class schools and providing incentives to better-off children to persuade them to attend working-class schools.

Macron wanted to make vocational education a priority. He has referred to Germany's system as one that his government would follow when putting forward measures relating to vocational education.

On 2 October 2020, Macron announced his intention to ban homeschooling with medical exceptions by 2021, in order to address separatist Islamic indoctrination, which he saw as conflicting with the secular values of the French Republic.

== On responsibility for the Holocaust ==
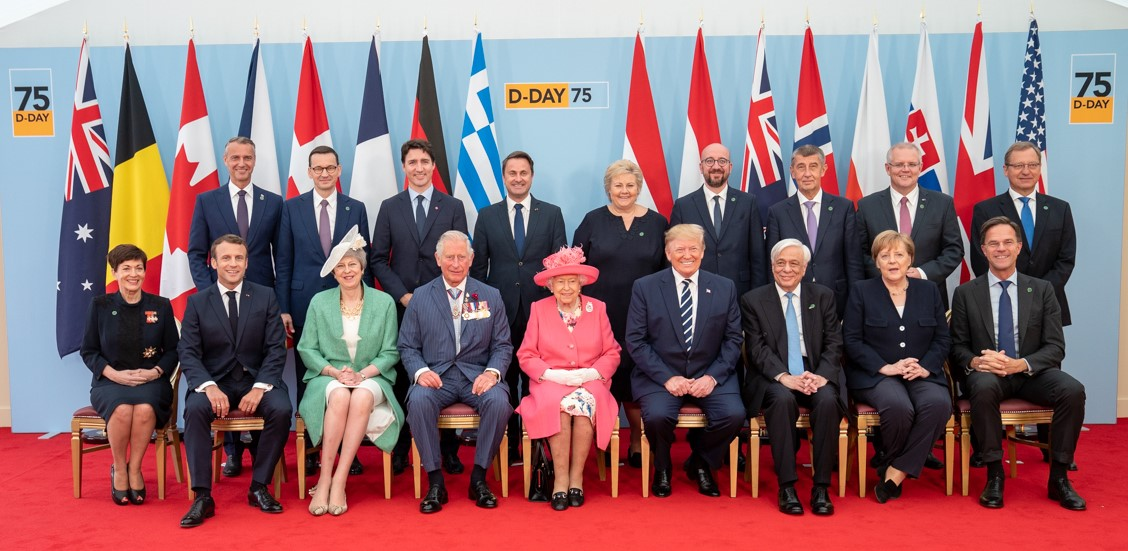
Macron with Queen Elizabeth II, Donald Trump, Theresa May, Angela Merkel, and other world leaders mark the 75th anniversary of D-Day in June 2019

In July 2017, while at a ceremony at the site of the Vélodrome d'Hiver where 13,000 Jews had been rounded up for deportation to death camps in July 1942, Macron denounced his country's role in the Holocaust and the historical revisionism that denied France's responsibility for the 1942 Vel' d'Hiv Roundup and the eventual deportation of 76,000 Jews. Earlier that year, Marine Le Pen, leader of the National Front, had stated in speeches that the government during WWII "was not France".

"It was indeed France that organised this [roundup]", Macron said, French police collaborating with the Nazis. "Not a single German took part," he added. Previous president Jacques Chirac had already stated that the government during the war represented the French state. Macron further stated: "It is convenient to see the Vichy regime as born of nothingness, returned to nothingness. Yes, it's convenient, but it is false. We cannot build pride upon a lie."

Macron made a subtle reference to Chirac's 1995 apology when he added, "I say it again here. It was indeed France that organized the roundup, the deportation, and thus, for almost all, death."

=== On anti-Zionism and antisemitism ===
In a 2017 speech condemning the historical collaboration of France with the Nazis, Macron also termed anti-Zionism as a new form of antisemitism. While addressing Prime Minister of Israel Benjamin Netanyahu, Macron stated that "we will never surrender to the messages of hate; we will not surrender to anti-Zionism because it is a reinvention of anti-Semitism." He also drew parallels between antisemitism in the past and present. He stated, "You only need to stop for a moment," adding, "to see, behind the new façade, the racism of old, the entrenched vein of anti-Semitism."

On 11th November, 2023, Macron expressed support for a ceasefire in the Gaza war. Despite recognising a right for Israel to defend itself and condemning the preceding attacks on Israel by Hamas, he said that there was "no justification" for the bombing of Gaza by Israeli forces, arguing that the bombardments "de facto" targeted civilians, especially women and children. Macron went on to express his wishes for other world leaders to join his calls for a ceasefire.

== On nationalism ==
During a ceremony commemorating the centenary of the Armistice of 11 November 1918, he referred to nationalism as the "exact opposite" of patriotism, and a betrayal of it, characterizing nationalism as "who cares about others". This prompted criticism that his definition was wrong.

== On George Floyd ==
In response to the 2020 George Floyd protests, Macron stated that he opposed racism and acknowledged systemic discrimination existed toward some people in France. He said that unlike other countries, controversial statues of French people from the colonial period would not be removed.

== New Caledonian independence ==
Macron expressed gratitude for the result of the 2020 New Caledonian independence referendum, thanking New Caledonians for their "vote of confidence" in the Republic. He also acknowledged those who had backed independence of the French Pacific territory of New Caledonia, calling for dialogue between all sides to map out the future of the region.

== See also ==
- Presidency of Emmanuel Macron
