= Charles Gheerbrant =

French politician (1924–2019)

Deputy for Pas-de-Calais's 2nd constituency in the National Assembly of France
- In office 1993–1997
- Preceded by: André Delehedde
- Succeeded by: Catherine Génisson

Mayor of Saint-Nicolas
- In office 1973–2001

Personal details
- Born: 13 September 1924
- Died: 23 April 2019 (aged 94)
- Political party: UDF

Charles Gheerbrant (13 September 1924 – 23 April 2019) was a French politician who served as a National Assembly Deputy (1993–1997) and as Mayor of Saint-Nicolas (1973–2001).
