= Bruno Duvergé =

French politician (born 1957)

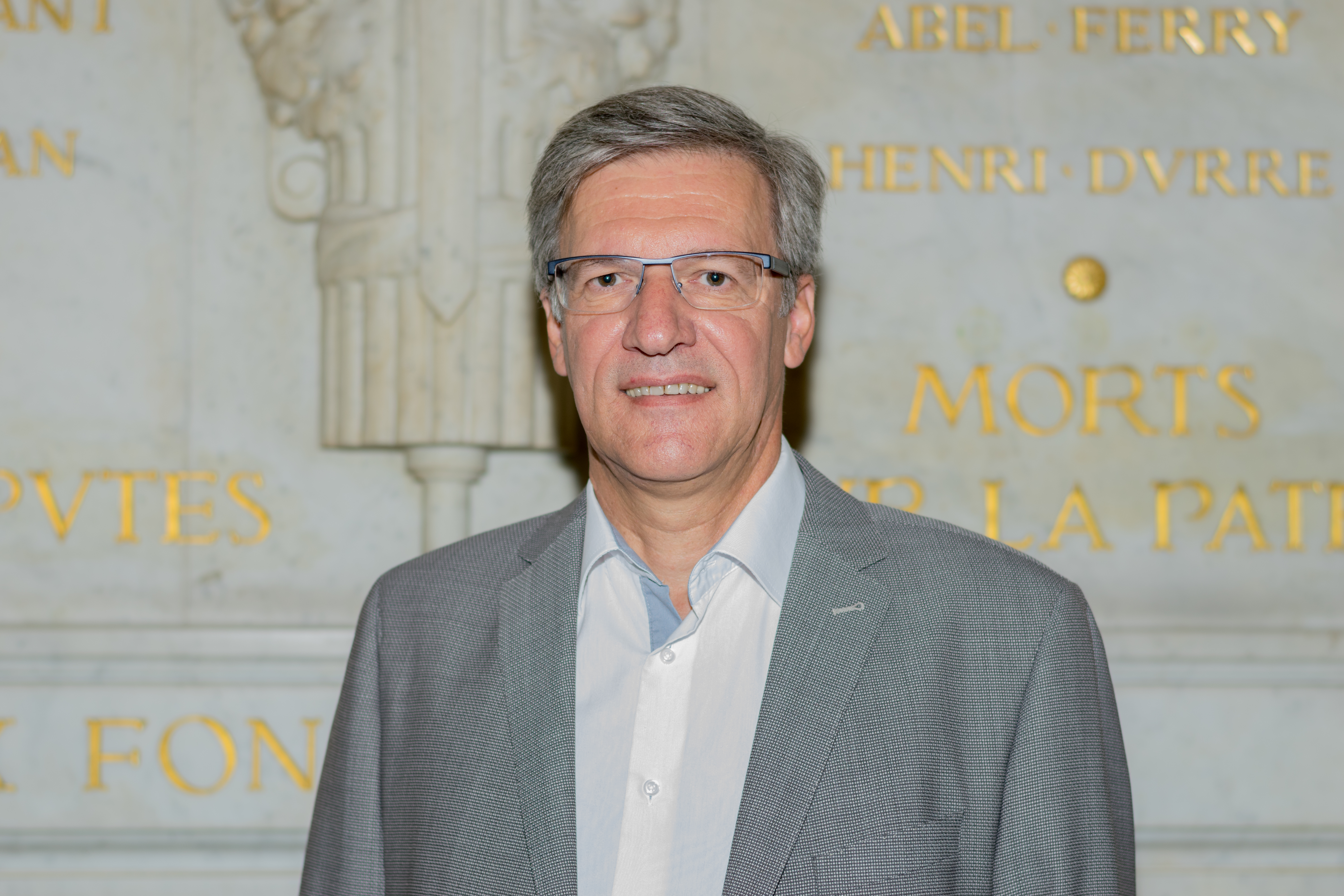

MP for Pas-de-Calais's 1st constituency
- Incumbent
- Assumed office 2017
- Preceded by: Jean-Jacques Cottel

Personal details
- Party: Democratic Movement
- Education: Emlyon Business School
- Occupation: politician

Bruno Duvergé (born 3 April 1957) is a French politician representing the Democratic Movement. He was elected to the French National Assembly on 18 June 2017, representing the department of Pas-de-Calais.
