= Institut national de l'audiovisuel =

French audiovisual archive

- Trade name: INA
- Type: Établissement public à caractère industriel et commercial
- Industry: Audiovisual
- Predecessor: ORTF
- Founded: January 6, 1975; 51 years ago
- Headquarters: Bry-sur-Marne, France
- Key people: Laurent Vallet (Director General)
- Revenue: ▲€37.9 million (2017); ▲€37.2 million (2016)
- Operating income: ▼€0.2 million (2017); ▲€1.9 million (2016)
- Net income: ▼€0.5 million (2017); ▲€2.8 million (2016)
- Number of employees: 1221 (2020)
- Website: institut.ina.fr

The Institut national de l'audiovisuel (French pronunciation: [ɛ̃stity nɑsjɔnal də lodjɔvizɥɛl]; transl. "National Audiovisual Institute"; abbr. INA) is a repository of all French radio and television audiovisual archives. Additionally it provides free access to archives of countries such as Afghanistan and Cambodia. It has its headquarters in Bry-sur-Marne.

Since 2006, it has allowed free online consultation on a website called ina.fr with a search tool indexing 100,000 archives of historical programs, for a total of 20,000 hours.

== Recordings ==
In the 1980s, it issued a large number of recordings on the label France's Concert Records. In the 1990s it launched its own label INA mémoire as the historical recording label of the Institut national de l'audiovisuel, and of the archives of Radio France.

== History ==
The Institut national de l'audiovisuel was founded in 1975 by a law of 1974 which split the ORTF into seven separate organisations. The INA is tasked with the purpose of conserving archives of audiovisual materials, research relating to them and professional training. In 1992, legal deposit was extended to television and radio, and the institute was to be the depository. This led to the establishment of the Inathèque in 1995, with the aim of conserving and making its holdings available to researchers and students. It was opened to the public in October 1998, at the Bibliothèque nationale de France - site François-Mitterrand. In 2002, legal deposit was extended to cable and satellite television and in 2005 to terrestrial digital television. From September 2006, the institute has been responsible for archiving 17 radio and 45 television services amounting to 300,000 hours per year.

== Presidents ==
Time	Person
1975-1979	Pierre Emmanuel
1979-1981	Gabriel de Broglie
1981-1983	Joël Letac
1983-1987	Jacques Pomonti
1987-1990	Janine Langlois-Glandier
1990-1994	Georges Fillioud
1994-1999	Jean-Pierre Teyssier
1999-2001	Francis Beck
2001-2010	Emmanuel Hoog
2010–2014	Mathieu Gallet
2014-2015	Agnès Saal
2015-	Laurent Vallet

== See also ==
- Groupe de Recherches Musicales
- François Bayle
