= Monique Barbut =

French politician (born 1956)

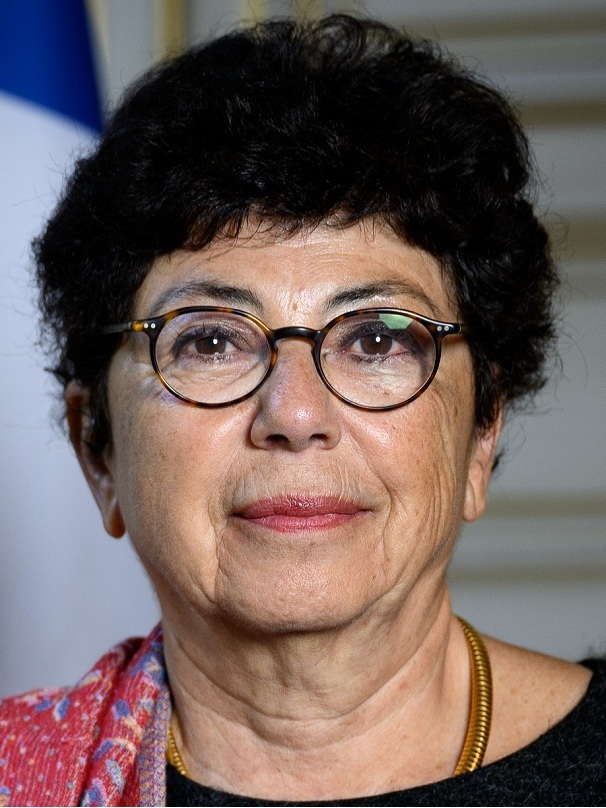
- Official portrait, 2025

Minister of Ecological Transition
- Incumbent
- Assumed office 12 October 2025
- Prime Minister: Sébastien Lecornu
- Preceded by: Agnès Pannier-Runacher

Personal details
- Born: 22 August 1956 (age 70) Safi, Morocco
- Party: Independent
- Education: University of Paris (BA, MPhil)

Monique Barbut (French pronunciation: [mɔnik baʁby]; born 22 August 1956) is a French civil servant and politician who has served as Minister of Ecological Transition in the second government of Prime Minister Sébastien Lecornu since 12 October 2025.

From 2013 until 2019, Barbut served as the Executive Secretary of the United Nations Convention to Combat Desertification (UNCCD). She was appointed to this position by the United Nations Secretary-General Ban Ki-moon on 16 September 2013.

== Early life and education ==
Barbut was born in Safi, Morocco, a few months after the end of the French protectorate in Morocco. Barbut obtained her Master of Philosophy in Economics and Bachelor of Arts in English from the University of Paris.

== Career ==
Due to her role in the French government in the 1992 Earth Summit and the establishment of the French Global Environment Facility, Barbut became the first chief executive officer of the French GEF. She subsequently held a number of high-ranking positions, including chief executive officer and chairperson of GEF (2006–2012) and director of the Division of Technology, Industry and Economics at the United Nations Environment Programme (2003–2006).

Later in her career, Barbut served as the special adviser to the chief executive officer of the French Development Agency (AFD) from 2012 to 2013. In 2019, she was a member of the "High-Level Group of Wise Persons" appointed by the Council of the European Union and charged with drafting recommendations on how to reform existing financial instruments for sustainable development managed by the European Commission, the European Investment Bank (EIB) and the European Bank for Reconstruction and Development (EBRD).

On 12 October 2025 she was appointed Minister of Ecological Transition in the second government of Prime Minister Sébastien Lecornu. She offered her resignation on 22 July 2026 to President Emmanuel Macron in protest of a bill passed by the French legislature that would allow the French Agency for Food, Environmental and Occupational Health & Safety (ANSES) to authorise for the use of acetamiprid and flupyradifurone, pesticides accused of harming bees. After meeting with President Emmanuel Macron, her resignation was ultimately rejected, and she remained in office.

== Other activities ==
- International Gender Champions (IGC), Member

== Honours ==
=== France ===
- 2008: Appointed Knight of the National Order of the Legion of Honour
- 2016: Promoted to Officer of the National Order of the Legion of Honour
