= Catherine Génisson =

French politician

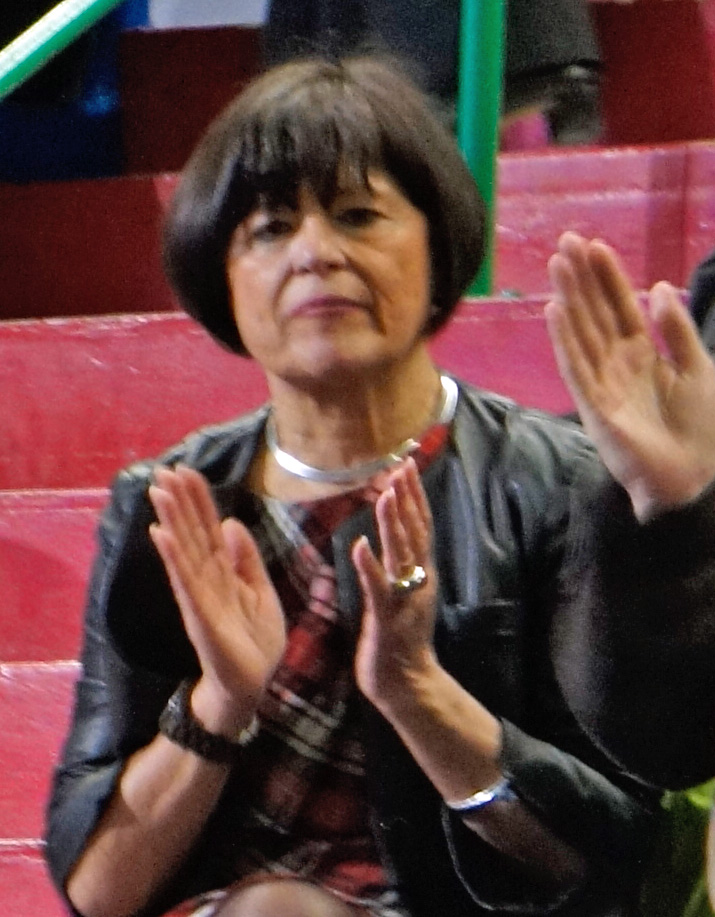
- Catherine Génisson French politician and senator

Deputy for Pas-de-Calais's 2nd constituency in the National Assembly of France
- In office 13 July 1995 – 30 September 2011
- Preceded by: Charles Gheerbrant
- Succeeded by: vacant until 2012 election Jacqueline Maquet

Senator for Pas-de-Calais
- In office 1 October 2011 – 1 October 2017

Regional Councillor of Nord-Pas-de-Calais
- In office 28 March 2004 – 13 December 2015

Personal details
- Born: 22 April 1949 (age 76) Paris

Catherine Génisson (born 22 April 1949) is a French politician of the Socialist Party (PS) who represented the Pas-de-Calais department in the National Assembly of France from 1997 to 2011 and later in the French Senate from 2011 to 2017.

== Political career ==
The daughter of painter Claude Génisson, Génisson was first elected to the French assembly in 1997 and was reelected in 2002 and 2007. She was elected to the French senate on September 25, 2011.

Ahead of the Socialist Party's 2008 convention in Reims, Génisson publicly endorsed Martine Aubry as candidate to succeed François Hollande at the party's leadership. In the party's 2011 primaries, she endorsed Aubry as its candidate for the 2012 presidential election.
