= Agnès Pannier-Runacher =

French politician and business executive

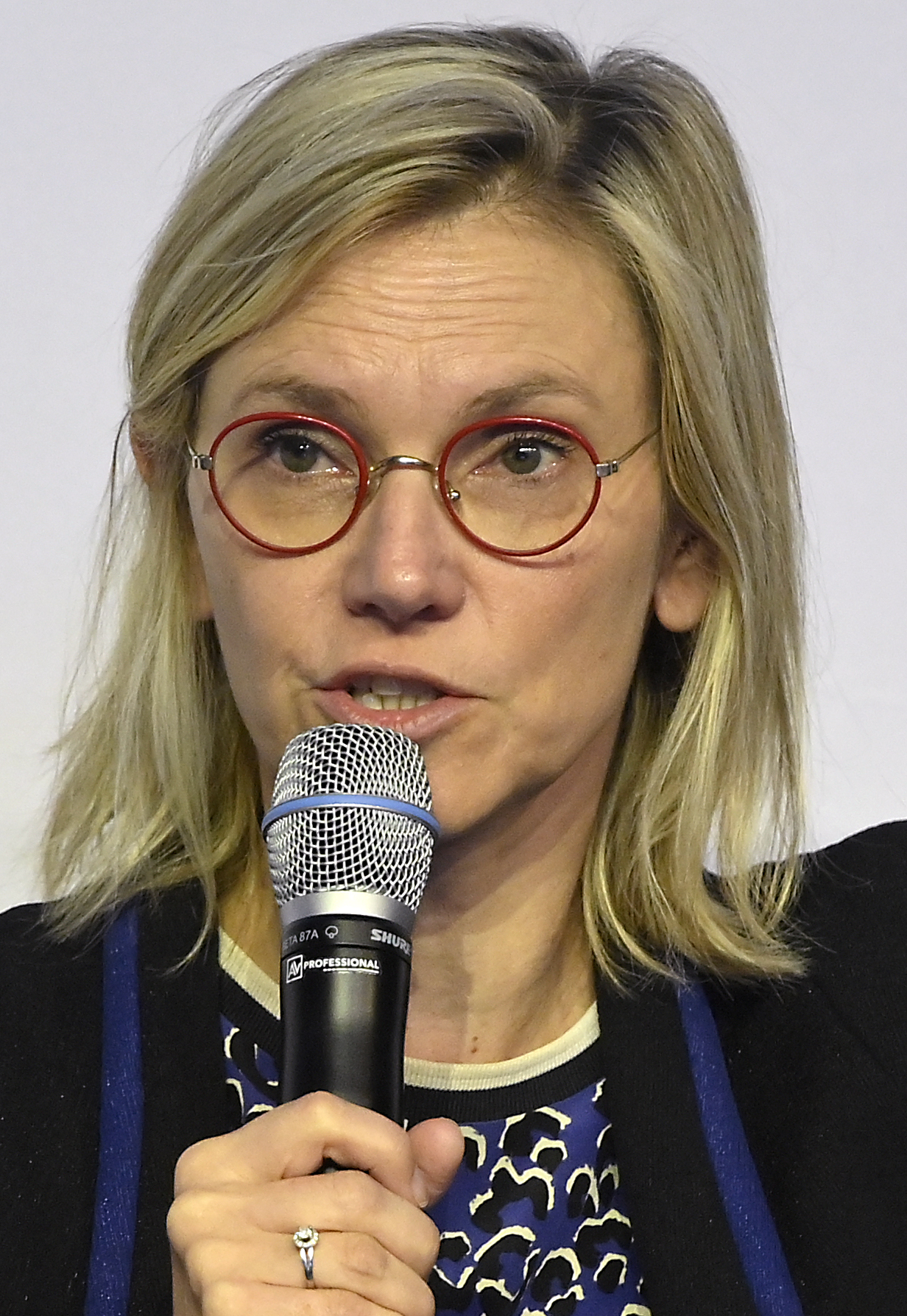
- Pannier-Runacher in 2023

Minister of Ecological Transition, Biodiversity, Forest, Sea and Fishing
- In office 21 September 2024 – 12 October 2025
- Prime Minister: Michel Barnier; François Bayrou; Sébastien Lecornu
- Preceded by: Christophe Béchu
- Succeeded by: Monique Barbut

Minister Delegate to the Minister of Agriculture and Food Sovereignty
- In office 8 February 2024 – 21 September 2024
- Prime Minister: Gabriel Attal
- Minister: Marc Fesneau

Member of the National Assembly for Pas-de-Calais's 2nd constituency
- In office 18 July 2024 – 21 October 2024
- Preceded by: Jacqueline Maquet
- Succeeded by: Pauline Levasseur

Minister for Energy Transition
- In office 20 May 2022 – 11 January 2024
- Prime Minister: Élisabeth Borne
- Preceded by: Ségolène Royal (as Minister of Ecology, Sustainable Development and Energy)
- Succeeded by: Roland Lescure (as Minister Delegate for Industry and Energy)

Minister Delegate for Industry
- In office 6 July 2020 – 20 May 2022
- Prime Minister: Jean Castex; Élisabeth Borne
- Minister: Bruno Le Maire
- Preceded by: Christophe Sirugue
- Succeeded by: Roland Lescure

Secretary of State for Economy and Finance
- In office 16 October 2018 – 6 July 2020
- Prime Minister: Édouard Philippe; Jean Castex
- Minister: Bruno Le Maire
- Preceded by: Delphine Gény-Stephann

Personal details
- Born: Agnès Runacher; 19 June 1974 (age 52) Paris, France
- Party: Renaissance (2022–present)
- Other political affiliations: Territories of Progress (2020–2022)
- Spouse: Marc Pannier (div. 2022)
- Domestic partner: Nicolas Bays (2023–present)
- Children: 3
- Education: HEC Paris; Sciences Po, ÉNA

Agnès Pannier-Runacher (French pronunciation: [aɲɛs panje ʁynaʃe]; born 19 June 1974; née Agnès Runacher) is a French business executive and politician of La République En Marche! (LREM) who served as the Minister of Ecological Transition in the successive governments of Prime Ministers Michel Barnier, François Bayrou and Sébastien Lecornu from 2024 to 2025.

Pannier-Runacher previously was State Secretary at the Ministry of Agriculture in the government of Prime Minister Gabriel Attal (2024) and Minister for Energy Transition in the government of Prime Minister Élisabeth Borne (2022–2024) and Secretary of State for Economy and Finance in the governments of successive Prime Ministers Édouard Philippe and Jean Castex (2018–2022).

== Early life and education ==
Pannier-Runacher was born in Paris, Ile-de-France on 19 June 1974. Her father was an executive at Perenco, an oil-and-gas company. She is a graduate of HEC Paris (1995), Sciences Po and the École nationale d'administration (ENA), where her classmates included Alexis Kohler. She describes her family's political outlook as "centre-left".

== Civil service career ==
Pannier-Runacher joined the French Civil Service in 2000. She first worked at the Inspection générale des finances and then joined the Assistance Publique – Hôpitaux de Paris in a managerial role from 2003 to 2006. In 2006 she joined the Caisse des dépôts et consignations as deputy director in charge of strategy and finances. In 2009 she became executive director of the Strategic Investment Fund.

== Business career ==
Pannier-Runacher joined the private company Faurecia in 2011. In 2013 she became deputy director at the Compagnie des Alpes in charge of development and performance of skiing and leisure centers.

== Political career ==
Pannier-Runacher was an early supporter of Emmanuel Macron during the 2017 French presidential election and is a member of the La République En Marche! party. Pannier-Runacher was a candidate in the 16th arrondissement of Paris in the 2020 municipal elections but was ultimately defeated. In early 2021, she announced her candidacy in that year's elections for the Regional Council of Hauts-de-France. In January 2022, Pannier-Runacher and Élisabeth Moreno jointly published a book on feminism. She was elected as the member of the National Assembly for the Pas-de-Calais's 2nd constituency in the 2024 legislative election, succeeding Jacqueline Maquet.

=== Secretary of State for Economy and Finance ===
Pannier-Runacher was appointed as Secretary of State for Economy and Finance, serving under the leadership of minister Bruno Le Maire, on 16 October 2018. At the time of her appointment, she was the highest-paid official to join the government, earning more than €500,00 per year.

Early in her tenure, Pannier-Runacher oversaw the 2.8 billion euros auction of 5G frequencies conducted by French regulator ARCEP in October 2020.

During the COVID-19 pandemic in France, Pannier-Runacher was put in charge of organizing and reinforcing the production and supply of materials for health care personnel and institutions, such as respirators, personal protective equipment and swabs. She also oversaw the ramp-up of the production of face masks in France.

She resisted calls from opposition figures such as Jean-Luc Mélenchon and Marine Le Pen, as well as the General Confederation of Labour to nationalise a factory which manufactured oxygen cylinders located in Gerzat, Puy-de-Dôme. Workers continued to maintain the equipment despite its closure in 2019 and had occupied the factory since January 2020, accusing Luxfer of intentionally creating a shortage by closing down the last oxygen cylinder manufacturing factory in Europe. Pannier-Runacher argued that the factory was not considered for nationalisation as it had no strategic value in the context of health independence.

She was promoted on 6 July 2020 under the new government of Jean Castex, attaining the status of minister as Minister Delegate for Industry, a newly created position which replaced that of the Secretary of State under the purview of the Ministry of Economy and Finance.

She led the French inter-ministerial task force participating in the negotiation for the procurement of Covid-19 vaccines.

=== Minister for Energy Transition ===
She was appointed Minister for Energy Transition under the Borne government on 20 May 2022. Her appointed was met with criticism over her lack of experience in the area under the purview of the ministry, as well as her family's ties with Perenco, the second-largest oil-and-gas company in France.

Pannier-Runacher launched an alliance of nuclear power-supporting European Union countries in March 2023 amid conflict with Germany over whether low-carbon hydrogen produced from nuclear plants should be considered equal to the hydrogen produced by renewable energy sources such as wind, solar, and hydropower by the EU.

In October 2023, Pannier-Runacher participated in the first joint cabinet retreat of the German and French governments in Hamburg, chaired by Chancellor Olaf Scholz and President Emmanuel Macron to settle differences relating to energy, industrial, and defence policies. One week later, the twenty-seven countries in the European Union reached an agreement to reform the European electricity market that had been hindered by Franco-German disagreements. The French government claims that the agreement will allow Électricité de France to build the six EPR nuclear reactors that had been announced in February 2022.

The minister is spearheading France's nuclear energy expansion push across the European Union, advocating for low-carbon nuclear power to be explicitly integrated into broader EU clean energy frameworks alongside renewables. According to the French government, the Nuclear Alliance met in June 2026 to discuss post-2030 energy plans. The organization said Europe must decarbonize and all fuels that are cost-effective and technologically commercial should be used. "Nuclear power is a sovereign and strategic technology that complements intermittent renewable energy sources, thanks to its inherently reliable and baseload nature."

She mobilized nearly 100 countries behind a legally binding global plastic lifecycle treaty, which was published by the French Ministry of Ecological Transition.

=== Minister Delegate to the Minister of Agriculture and Food Sovereignty ===
She was appointed Minister Delegate to the Minister of Agriculture and Food Sovereignty Marc Fesneau on 8 February 2024 in the Attal government.

== Other activities ==
- Elis, Independent Member of the Board of Directors (2014–2018)
- Bourbon, Independent Member of the Board of Directors (2009–2018)

== Personal life ==
Pannier-Runacher is in a relationship with Nicolas Bays, a former Socialist MP and longtime Macron supporter. She has three children.

In 2021, Pannier-Runacher moved to Lens, Pas-de-Calais, into a property rented by Bays from an estate company controlled by heirs of the late Olivier Dassault since 2017.
