= Pas-de-Calais's 2nd constituency =

Constituency of the National Assembly of France

2nd constituency of the Pas-de-Calais
- inline Constituency of the National Assembly of France

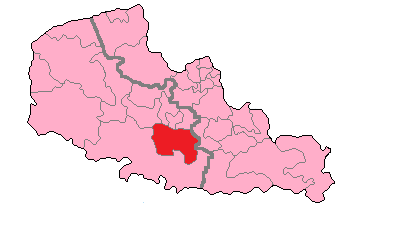
- Pas-de-Calais' 2nd constituency shown within Nord-Pas-de-Calais
- Deputy: Agnès Pannier-Runacher; RE
- Department: Pas-de-Calais
- Cantons: Arras-Nord, Arras-Ouest, Arras-Sud, Dainville, Vimy
- Registered voters: 84,287

The 2nd constituency of the Pas-de-Calais is a French legislative constituency in the Pas-de-Calais département.

== Description ==
Pas-de-Calais' 2nd constituency was enlarged as a result of the 2010 redistricting of French legislative constituencies to include the entire of Arras having previously only contained the north of the city. Politically Arras is famed for being the birthplace of revolutionary Maximilien de Robespierre.

The constituency is currently held by Jacqueline Maquet who had previously represented Pas-de-Calais' 1st constituency.

== Historic Representatives ==
Election	Member	Party
1988	André Delehedde	PS
1993	Charles Gheerbrant	UDF
1997	Catherine Génisson	PS
2002	Catherine Génisson	PS
2007	Catherine Génisson	PS
2012	Jacqueline Maquet	PS
2017	Jacqueline Maquet	LREM
2022	Jacqueline Maquet	RE
2024	Agnès Pannier-Runacher	RE

== Election results ==
=== 2024 ===
Candidate	Party	Alliance	First round			Second round		
Candidate	Party	Alliance	Votes	%	+/–	Votes	%	+/–
Alban Heusèle	RN		22,239	37.31	+12.63	25,028	44.16	-1.11
Agnès Pannier-Runacher	RE	Ensemble	12,838	21.54	-6.93	31,642	55.84	+1.11
Alexandre Cousin	LE	NFP	11,991	20.12	-2.36	withdrew		
Nicolas Desfachelle	DVC		8,303	13.93	new			
Makrouka Dhifallah	LR	UDC	2,180	3.66	-5.66			
Bruno Ladsous	ECO		946	1.59	new			
Nathalie Leblanc	REC		697	1.17	-2.01			
Béatrice Bouffart	LO		409	0.69	-0.42			
Votes			59,603	100.00		56,670	100.00	
Valid votes			59,603	97.60	+0.28	56,670	94.96	+5.54
Blank votes			981	1.61	-0.05	1,960	3.28	-3.49
Null votes			484	0.79	-0.23	1,045	1.75	-2.06
Turnout			61,068	68.93	+18.53	59,675	67.35	+18.45
Abstentions			27,528	31.07	-18.53	28,931	32.65	-18.45
Registered voters			88,596			88,606		
Result			RE HOLD					

=== 2022 ===
Legislative Election 2022: Pas-de-Calais's 2nd constituency
Party	Candidate	Votes	%	±%
LREM (Ensemble)	Jacqueline Maquet	12,234	28.47	-8.11
RN	Alban Heusele	10,604	24.68	+6.91
LFI (NUPÉS)	Morgane Rengard	9,660	22.48	−2.86
LR (UDC)	Emmanuelle Lapouille	4,004	9.32	−6.65
REC	Isabelle Georget	1,365	3.18	N/A
DVE	Bruno Ladsous	1,197	2.79	N/A
PA	Nathalie Zayonnet	1,053	2.45	N/A
PRG	Philippe La Grange	932	2.17	N/A
Others	N/A	1,925	4.48	
Turnout		42,974	50.40	−2.03
2nd round result
LREM (Ensemble)	Jacqueline Maquet	20,971	54.73	-10.78
RN	Alban Heusele	17,345	45.27	+10.78
Turnout		38,316	48.90	+2.19
LREM hold				

=== 2017 ===
Candidate	Label	First round		Second round	
Candidate	Label	Votes	%	Votes	%
Jacqueline Maquet	REM	15,889	36.58	22,847	65.51
Alban Heusele	FN	7,718	17.77	12,028	34.49
Alexandre Malfait	UDI	6,937	15.97		
Caroline Delplace	FI	5,531	12.73		
Antoine Détourné	PS	2,880	6.63		
Laure Olivier	ECO	2,051	4.72		
Véronique Loir	DLF	880	2.03		
Leïla Dutailly	PCF	548	1.26		
Ameline Clinckemaillié	DIV	338	0.78		
Abmajid Belhadj	EXG	307	0.71		
Audric Alexandre	DVG	260	0.60		
Michèle Dessenne	DVG	51	0.12		
Benjamin Charlier	DIV	44	0.10		
Votes		43,434	100.00	34,875	100.00
Valid votes		43,434	97.31	34,875	87.71
Blank votes		790	1.77	3,181	8.00
Null votes		410	0.92	1,707	4.29
Turnout		44,634	52.43	39,763	46.71
Abstentions		40,498	47.57	45,365	53.29
Registered voters		85,132		85,128	
Source: Ministry of the Interior

=== 2012 ===
Legislative Election 2012: Pas-de-Calais's 2nd constituency
Party	Candidate	Votes	%	±%
PS	Jacqueline Maquet	21,345	42.92	+4.12
UMP	Jean-Marie Prestaux	12,962	26.06	−9.23
FN	Dalila Decobert	8,440	16.97	+10.76
EELV	Laure Olivier	2,377	4.78	+2.10
FG	Sandra Dusautoir-Dionet	2,286	4.60	+2.04
DVD	Véronique Loir	1,222	2.46	N/A
Others	N/A	1,101		
Turnout		49,733	59.00	−6.84
2nd round result
PS	Jacqueline Maquet	27,626	59.27	+3.89
UMP	Jean-Marie Prestaux	18,982	40.73	−3.89
Turnout		46,608	55.30	−11.07
PS hold				

=== 2007 ===
Legislative Election 2007: Pas-de-Calais's 2nd constituency
Party	Candidate	Votes	%	±%
PS	Catherine Génisson	19,137	38.80	
UMP	Michel Ziolkowski	17,403	35.29	
MoDem	Denise Bocquillet	3,497	7.09	
FN	DD	3,063	6.21	
CPNT	Jean-Michel Becquet	1,529	3.10	
LV	Thierry Matezak	1,323	2.68	
Far left	Juliette Perrot	1,287	2.61	
PCF	Jean-Pierre Delezenne	1,263	2.56	
Others	N/A	816		
Turnout		50,382	65.84	
2nd round result
PS	Catherine Génisson	27,273	55.38	
UMP	Michel Ziolkowski	21,977	44.62	
Turnout		50,788	66.37	
PS hold				

=== 2002 ===
Legislative Election 2002: Pas-de-Calais's 2nd constituency
Party	Candidate	Votes	%	±%
PS	Catherine Génisson	15,812	32.71	
UMP	Francois Desmaziere	11,995	24.82	
FN	Catherine Salagnac	6,029	12.47	
PR	Jean-Marie Alexandre	3,644	7.54	
MPF	Jean-Francois Depret	3,298	6.82	
CPNT	Jean-Michel Becquet	2,230	4.61	
PCF	Jacques Patris	1,340	2.77	
Others	N/A	3,988		
Turnout		49,585	67.13	
2nd round result
PS	Catherine Génisson	24,766	54.16	
UMP	Francois Desmaziere	20,962	45.84	
Turnout		48,008	64.97	
PS hold				

=== 1997 ===
Legislative Election 1997: Pas-de-Calais's 2nd constituency
Party	Candidate	Votes	%	±%
UDF	Charles Gheerbrant	13,480	26.39	
PS	Catherine Génisson	13,115	25.68	
MRC	Jean-Marie Alexandre	11,844	23.19	
FN	Yvon-Marie Lherbier	7,344	14.38	
DVE	Gilles Pennequin	3,565	6.98	
DVD	Walter Lamiet	1,729	3.39	
Turnout		53,956	76.74	
2nd round result
PS	Catherine Génisson	29,317	56.89	
UDF	Charles Gheerbrant	22,216	43.11	
Turnout		55,013	78.23	
PS gain from UDF				

== Sources ==
- Official results of French elections from 1998: "Résultats électoraux officiels en France" (in French).
