= Ministry of Ecological Transition (France) =

Government ministry of France

- Ministère de la Transition écologique
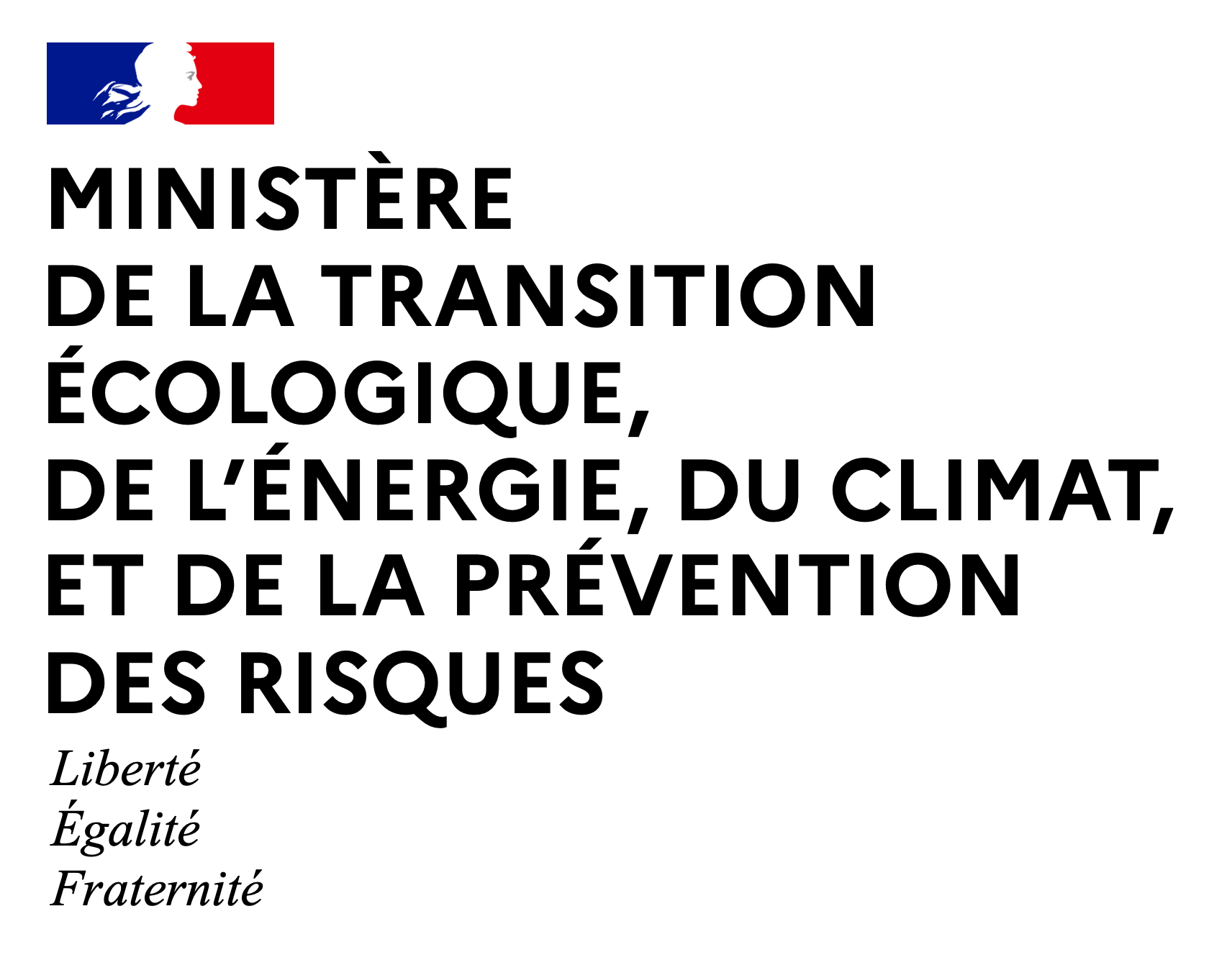

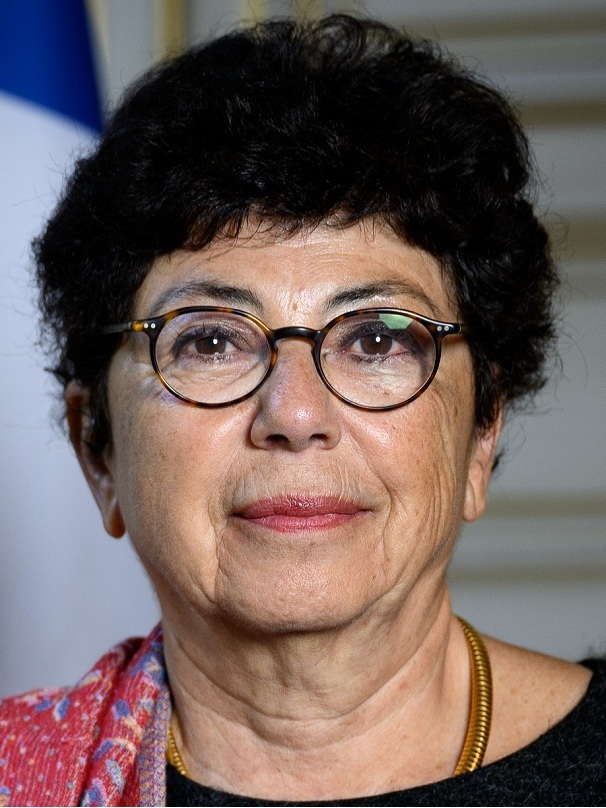
- Incumbent; Monique Barbut since 21 September 2024
- Member of: Council of Ministers
- Reports to: President of the Republic and to Parliament
- Residence: Hôtel de Roquelaure; 246 Boulevard Saint-Germain
- Seat: Paris, France
- Appointer: President of the Republic
- Term length: No fixed term Remains in office while commanding the confidence of the National Assembly and the President of the Republic
- Formation: 8 January 1971
- First holder: Robert Poujade
- Website: https://www.ecologique-solidaire.gouv.fr/

The Ministry of Ecological Transition (French: Ministère de la Transition écologique), commonly just referred to as Ministry of Ecology, is a department of the Government of France. It is responsible for preparing and implementing the government's policy in the fields of sustainable development, climate, energy transition and biodiversity. Monique Barbut was appointed Minister of Ecological Transition on 12 October 2025 in the Second Lecornu government.

The cabinet ministry is in Paris, while the ministry's administration is in the following places: Grande Arche Paroi Sud and Tour Sequoia, both in La Défense.

== History ==
On 8 January 1971, under President Georges Pompidou, the Ministry of the Environment (Ministère de l'Environnement) was created as a ministry subordinate to the Prime Minister of France. The first Minister of the Environment was Robert Poujade. From 1974 to 1977, the position was renamed Minister of Quality of Life; in 1978 it became Minister of the Environment and Way of Life. Sustainable development was added in 2002.

The ministry's administration is headquartered in Tour Sequoia and La Grande Arche, both in La Défense. The cabinet of the minister is within the Hôtel de Roquelaure, Boulevard Saint-Germain, Paris.

== Competencies ==
The ministry is responsible for the country's environmental policy (preservation of biodiversity, Climate Kyoto Protocol application, environmental control of industries), transportation (air, road, railway and sea regulation departments), national parks and housing policy. The ministry distributes funds to research agencies or councils. As of 2017, the ministry is also responsible for energy policy.

== Attached officeholders ==
=== Transports ===
The Minister delegate of Transport, currently Philippe Tabarot, is in charge of transport policy.

=== Housing ===
The Minister delegate of Housing, currently Vincent Jeanbrun, is in charge of housing policy.

=== Biodiversity ===
The Secretary of State in charge of Biodiversity is in charge of biodiversity policy. There is currently no such officeholder.

== Subordinate agencies ==
- Bureau of Enquiry and Analysis for Civil Aviation Safety (BEA)
- French Marine Accident Investigation Office (BEAmer)
- French Land Transport Accident Investigation Bureau (BEA-TT)
- Directorate General for Civil Aviation (DGAC)
- French Office for Biodiversity (OFC)

== Former names ==
- 1971: Ministry of the Protection of Nature and of the Environment (Ministère de la Protection de la nature et de l'environnement)
- 2007: Ministry of Ecology and Sustainable Development (Ministère de l'Écologie et du Développement durable)
- 2012: Ministry of the Environment, Sustainable Development and Energy (Ministère de l'Écologie, du Développement durable et de l'Énergie)
- 2016: Ministry of the Environment, Energy and the Sea (Ministère de l'Environnement, de l'Énergie et de la Mer)
- 2017: Ministry of Ecological and Solidarity Transition (Ministère de la Transition écologique et solidaire)
- 2020: Ministry of Ecological Transition (Ministère de la Transition écologique)
- 2024: Ministry of Ecological Transition, Energy, Climate and Risk Prevention (Ministère de la Transition écologique, de l'Énergie, du Climat et de la Prévention des risques)
- 2025: Ministry of Ecological Transition, Biodiversity, Forest, Sea and Fishing
- 2025: Ministry of Ecological Transition (Ministère de la Transition écologique)

== Ministers ==
Title	Minister	Party	Term start	Term end	Government	Notes
Minister for the Ecological and Solidary Transition	Nicolas Hulot	ecologist	2017-05-17	2017-06-19	Philippe 1	
Minister for the Ecological and Solidary Transition	Nicolas Hulot	ecologist	2017-06-19	2018-09-04	Philippe 2	
Minister for the Ecological and Solidary Transition	François de Rugy	La République En Marche!	2018-09-04	2019-07-16	Philippe 2	
Minister for the Ecological and Solidary Transition	Élisabeth Borne	La République En Marche!	2019-07-16	2020-07-03	Philippe 2	
Minister of the Ecological Transition	Barbara Pompili	La République En Marche!	2020-07-03	2022-05-20	Castex	
Minister of the Ecological Transition	Amélie de Montchalin	Renaissance	2022-05-22	2022-07-04	Borne	
Minister for Ecological Transition and Cohesion of the Territories	Christophe Béchu	Horizons	2022-07-04	2024-09-21	Borne	
Minister for Ecological Transition and Cohesion of the Territories	Christophe Béchu	Horizons	2022-07-04	2024-09-21	Attal	
Minister of Ecological Transition, Biodiversity, Forest, Sea and Fishing	Agnès Pannier-Runacher	Renaissance	2024-09-21		Barnier	
Minister of Ecological Transition, Biodiversity, Forest, Sea and Fishing	Agnès Pannier-Runacher	Renaissance	2024-09-21		Bayrou	
Minister of Ecological Transition, Biodiversity, Forest, Sea and Fishing	Agnès Pannier-Runacher	Renaissance	2024-09-21		Lecornu 1	
Minister for Ecological Transition, Biodiversity and International Negotiations on Climate and Nature	Monique Barbut	independent	2025-10-12		Lecornu 2	
