= Hénin-sur-Cojeul =

- Commune
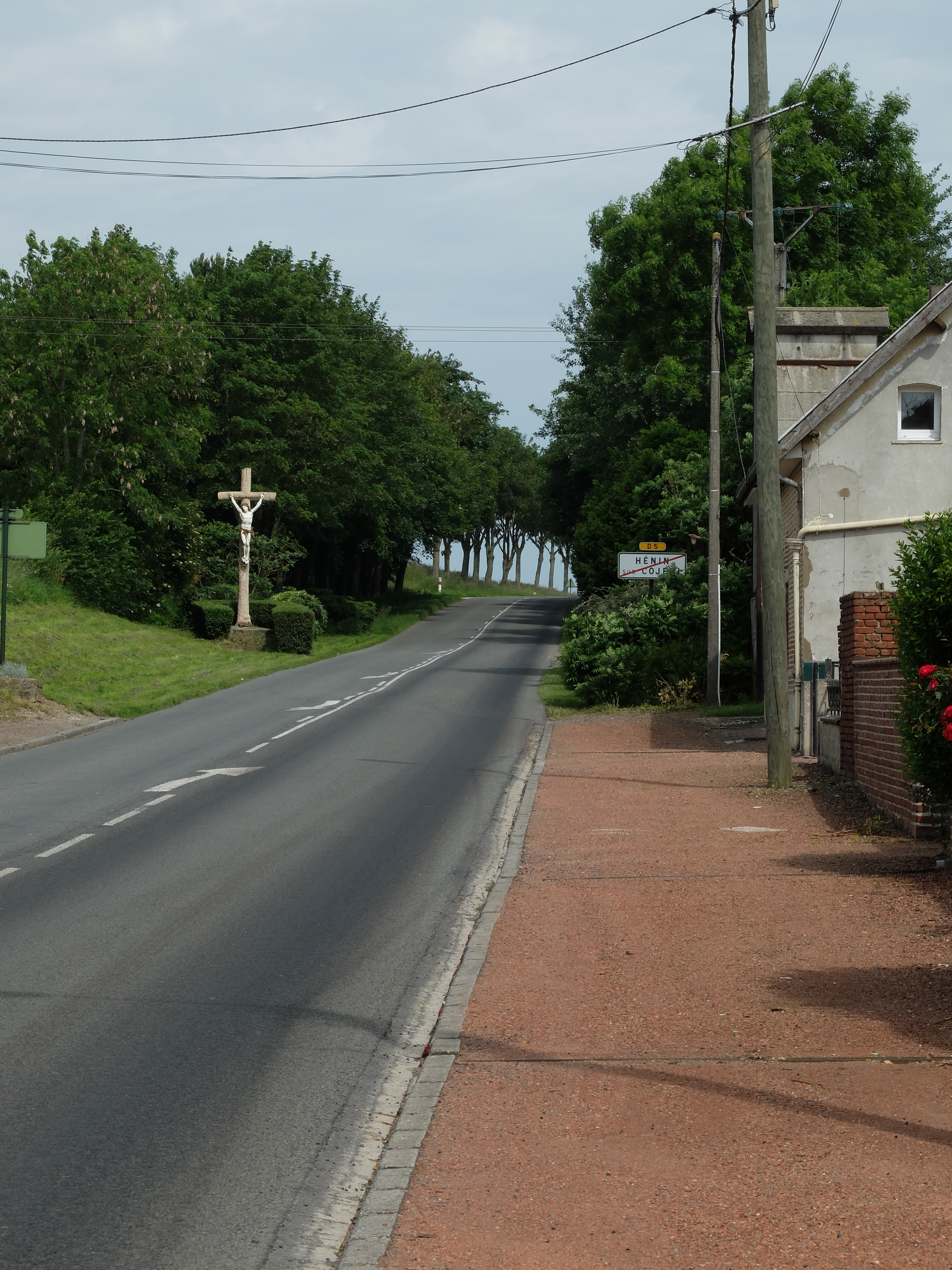
- The RD 5 road in Hénin-sur-Cojeul

- Coat of arms
- Location of Hénin-sur-Cojeul
- Location within France Location within Hauts-de-France
- Coordinates: 50°13′32″N 2°50′07″E
- Country: France
- Region: Hauts-de-France
- Department: Pas-de-Calais
- Arrondissement: Arras
- Canton: Arras-3
- Intercommunality: CU Arras

Government
  - Mayor (2020–2026): Olivier Maury
- Area^{1}: 6.81 km^{2} (2.63 sq mi)
- Elevation: 65 m (213 ft)
- Highest elevation: 106 m (348 ft)
- Lowest elevation: 63 m (207 ft)
- Population (2023): 528
  - Density: 77.5/km^{2} (201/sq mi)
- Time zone: UTC+01:00 (CET)
  - Summer (DST): UTC+02:00 (CEST)
- INSEE/Postal code: 62428 /62128
- ^{1} French Land Register data, which excludes lakes, ponds, glaciers > 1 km^{2} (0.386 sq mi or 247 acres) and river estuaries.

Hénin-sur-Cojeul (French pronunciation: [enɛ̃ syʁ kɔʒœl]) is a commune in the Pas-de-Calais department in the Hauts-de-France region of France 6 miles (10 km) southeast of Arras.

== Population ==
Historical population
Year	Pop.	±% p.a.
1968	344	—
1975	324	−0.85%
1982	367	+1.80%
1990	365	−0.07%
1999	372	+0.21%
2007	443	+2.21%
2012	498	+2.37%
2017	527	+1.14%
2023	528	+0.03%
Source: INSEE

== See also ==
- Communes of the Pas-de-Calais department
