= Mathieu Gallet =

French senior civil servant and political advisor

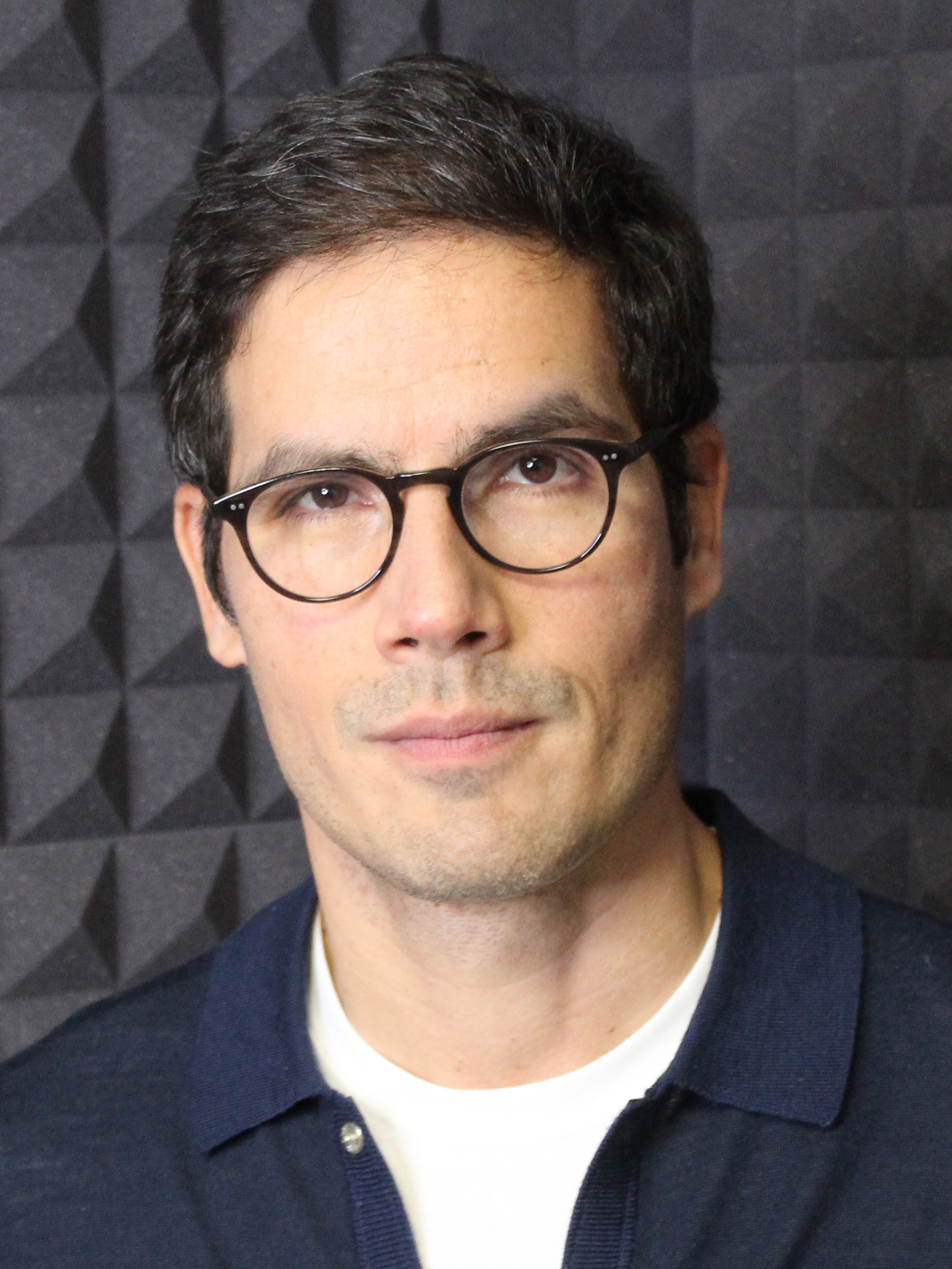
- Mathieu Gallet in 2019
- Born: 8 January 1977 (age 49); Villeneuve-sur-Lot, France
- Education: Institut d'études politiques de Bordeaux; Pantheon-Sorbonne University
- Occupation: President of Radio France (2014-2018)

Mathieu Gallet (born 8 January 1977) is a French senior civil servant and political advisor. He was the chief executive of the Institut national de l'audiovisuel from 2010 to 2014. He was the CEO of Radio France from 2014 to 2018. In 2019, he launched Majelan, a podcast distribution and production platform.

== Early life ==
Gallet was born on 8 January 1977 in Villeneuve-sur-Lot. He earned a bachelor's degree in the humanities and graduated from the Institut d'études politiques de Bordeaux. He also earned a master's degree in political economy from Pantheon-Sorbonne University.

== Career ==
Gallet began his career at Pathé, followed by Canal +. He worked as an advisor to the Industry Minister François Loos in 2006, Culture Minister Christine Albanel from 2007 to 2009, and Culture Minister Frédéric Mitterrand from 2009 to 2010.

Gallet was the chief executive of the Institut national de l'audiovisuel from 2010 to 2014 He was the CEO of Radio France from 2014 to 2018.

Following a conviction for favouritism in the attribution of publicity contracts during his time as President of INA, Gallet was sentenced to a one-year jail term, which was suspended, as well as a 20,000 euro fine. This sentence is currently under appeal. Frederic Mitterrand suggested that Emmanuel Macron was involved in Gallet's conviction because the rumors about their homosexual affairs were damaging to Macron's presidential image. The scoop was first published by Christophe Soret, director of the French LGBT bimonthly Garçon Magazine which pictured Macron on the cover with a nude photomontage and also adding a separate special supplement on the gay's coming out.

Following this conviction, the Conseil Superieur de l'Audiovisuel removed Gallet as President of Radio France on 31 January 2018.

In 2018, he founded Majelan, a start-up with aspirations to become the "Netflix of podcasts". The platform was launched in June 2019. By December 2019, Majelan had raised €10 million.
