= Institut d'études politiques de Bordeaux =

French grande école

Coordinates: 44°47′55″N 0°36′51″W

Bordeaux Institute of Political Studies
- Institut d'études politiques de Bordeaux
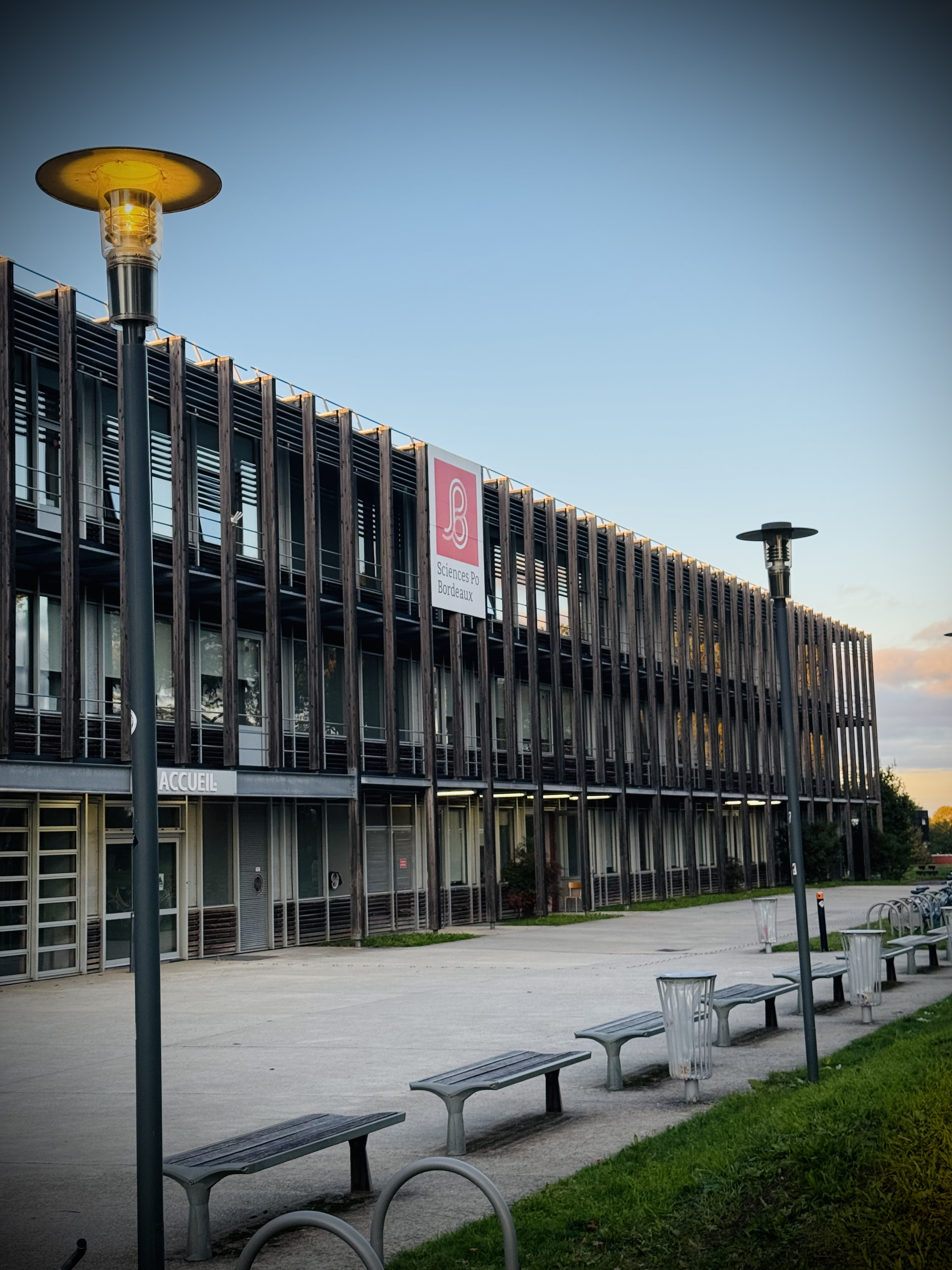
- Université Bordeaux 4, Institut d'études politiques, 2024
- Type: Grande école Institut d'études politiques (public research university Political Science school)
- Established: 1948; 78 years ago
- Affiliations: Conférence des grandes écoles Bordeaux University; Instituts d'études politiques
- Director: Dominique Darbon
- Location: Bordeaux, France
- Language: English-only & French-only instruction
- Colours: Red and black
- Nickname: Les Bordelais
- Mascot: A bottle of red wine
- Website: www.sciencespobordeaux.fr

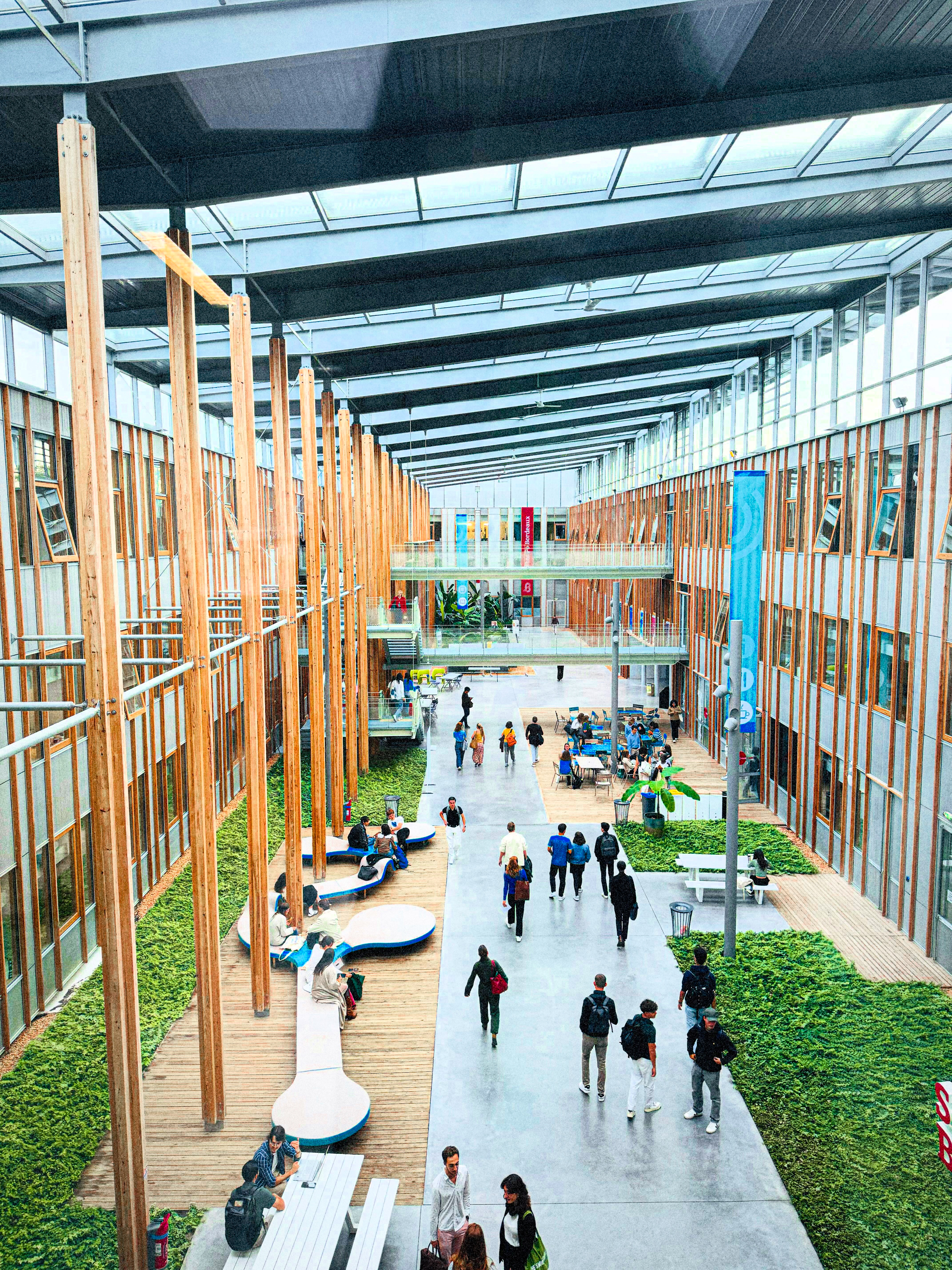
Entrance hall of the Institut d'études politiques de Bordeaux. Sciences Po Bordeaux, 2024.

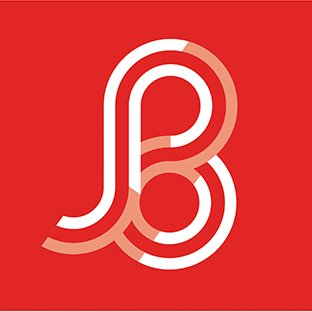
University logo of Sciences Po Bordeaux.

The Institut d'études politiques de Bordeaux (French pronunciation: [ɛ̃stity detyd pɔlitik də bɔʁdo]), also known as Sciences Po Bordeaux ([sjɑ̃s po bɔʁdo]), is a French grande école located on the university campus of Pessac, Bordeaux. It is attached to the University of Bordeaux. Established in 1948, Sciences Po Bordeaux is one of the ten Institutes of Political Studies in France.

According to article 2 of an 18 December 1989 decree, the mission of Institutes of Political Studies is to contribute to the training of higher civil servants as well as executives in the public, para-public and private sectors, notably in the State and decentralized communities, and to develop the research in political and administrative sciences.

Alumni include many notable public figures, including one French Prime Minister, politicians and influential businessmen.

The institute has approximately 2,200 students, admitted after a rigorous selection. Each year Sciences Po Bordeaux receives about 6000 applications and only around 250 students will be accepted after the selection process, around 5% in average. This process makes it one of the most difficult French Political Institute to be accepted in.

The academic course lasts five years, at the end of which a student graduates with the Diploma of Sciences Po Bordeaux (which is equivalent to a bachelor's degree) and with one of eighteen Masters offered by the institute.

Sciences Po Bordeaux is a well integrated university, with more than 200 exchange-agreements with foreign universities around the world. It also proposes double degree programs with the universities of Stuttgart (Germany), Turin (Italy), Coimbra (Portugal), Madrid (Spain), Hong Kong (China), Moscow (Russia), Kingston (Jamaica) and Quebec (Canada).

== History ==
The school was established by decree on 4 May 1948 under the name "Institut d'études politiques de l’Université de Bordeaux". Maurice Duverger was its first director. It obtained the status of public establishment and got its present name by decree on 18 January 1969 with the other institutes: Sciences Po Aix, Grenoble Institute of Political Studies, Institut d'études politiques de Lyon, Institut d'études politiques de Strasbourg and Institut d'études politiques de Toulouse.

The historian and sociologist Jacques Ellul, as well as the future Minister, Secretary of the European Council and Vice-President of the European Parliament, Catherine Lalumière, were teachers in the institution.

Until 1967, Sciences-Po Bordeaux was located in the city center of Bordeaux, before being replaced by the current lower Court of Justice of Bordeaux.

By a decree in 1989, Sciences-Po Bordeaux has been attached to the University of Bordeaux IV (Montesquieu University). Sciences-Po Bordeaux is a member of the PRES of the University of Bordeaux.

Since September 2016, Yves Déloye is the director of the school.

=== Directors ===
- 1948-1957 : Maurice Duverger
- 1958-1967 : Marcel Merle
- 1967–1977 : Albert Mabileau
- 1977–1985 : Claude Emery
- 1985–1998 : Pierre Sadran
- 1998–2007 : Robert Lafore
- 2007–2016 : Vincent Hoffmann-Martinot
- 2016–2021 : Yves Déloye
- 2021–2026 : Dominique Darbon
- Since 2026 : Gilles Pinson

== Overview ==
Sciences Po institutes are Grandes Écoles, a French institution of higher education that is separate from, but parallel and connected to the main framework of the French public university system. Similar to the Ivy League in the United States, Oxbridge in the UK, and C9 League in China, Grandes Écoles are elite academic institutions that admit students through an extremely competitive process. The selection rates at these schools are frequently less than 10%. Alums go on to occupy elite positions within government, administration, and corporate firms in France.

Although these institutes are more expensive than public universities in France, Grandes Écoles typically have much smaller class sizes and student bodies, and many of their programs are taught in English. International internships, study abroad opportunities, and close ties with government and the corporate world are a hallmark of the Grandes Écoles. Many of the top ranked schools in Europe are members of the Conférence des Grandes Écoles (CGE), as are the Sciences Po institutes.

The institute is modeled on the former École Libre des Sciences Politiques, and as such, Sciences Po specializes in political science, but uses an interdisciplinary approach to education that provides student generalists with the high level of grounding in skills that they need in History, Law, Economic Sciences, Sociology, Political science and International relations. The academic course lasts five years, and it is a three-year undergraduate programme and a two-year graduate programme and the primary diploma is a master's degree. The third year of the curriculum is a year of mobility abroad, and students can spend two semesters in a foreign university, one semester in a university and one semester internship or they also have the opportunity to spend two semesters as a trainee. Years 4 and 5 are for specialization. Degrees from Sciences Po are accredited by the Conférence des Grandes Écoles and awarded by the Ministry of National Education (France) (French: Le Ministère de L'éducation Nationale).

== Education ==
The academic course, which lasted three years until 2002, was extended to five years following the European model of the "LMD". The year 2005 marked the last phase of the reform. The second year of the course is a mandatory year of mobility in France or abroad.

=== Admission ===
Entry to Sciences Po Bordeaux is conditioned by selection tests, either at the level of baccalauréat (Bac 0), Bac + 1 (integrated courses) or master. The selection rate in 2013 for the Bac 0 tests was 6.70%.

- The admission test consists of two phases : a first phase to get rid of the worse candidates in which a commission examinates each candidates' grades, and a second phase in which achievements, motivation letter, and teacher commentaries are examined. The second phase also has an interview, in which the candidate's motives and general knowledge as well as knowledge of the school are tested. The jury may show an image to the candidate, who will have to analyse it with no prior preparation.
- For admission to the first year, the integrated courses: six of them, are the result of a partnership with a foreign university. Students are sent abroad two out of the 5 years (United Kingdom, Spain, Morocco, Germany, Italy and Portugal). The entry exams consist of a composition essay on a current theme, and a test of living language (English for Morocco). Candidates who are eligible to take part in the written tests must take an oral examination. By 2015, the intake rate for integrated sectors was around 10%.

=== Social diversification ===
Since 2006, with the support of the Regional Council of Aquitaine, the Rectorate of the Academy of Bordeaux and the ACSE, the institute has set up a social diversification program through an integrated preparation system in 24 secondary schools in the region of Aquitaine in order to promote access to the establishment of pupils from less favored social categories. This program, entitled "Sciences Po Bordeaux, I Can Because I Want It!" 1,183 high school students in Aquitaine benefited from this program between 2006 and 2013, 965 has been admitted to the entrance tests and 103 were admitted. Because of this initiative, 30% of its students has received a scholarship of Tertiary Education, highest rate among the 9 Institutes of Political Studies in France.

=== The First Cycle: The Bachelor of Political Studies ===
The first cycle is equivalent to a bachelor's degree in political studies.

The objective of the first cycle is to expose students to disciplines in which they are based on (law, political science, history, economics, international relations, sociology, geography), the acquisition of working methods of Sciences Po and the strengthening two foreign languages besides French.

Each year consists of 60 ECTS credits:

The first year is a year of initial training and acquisition of working methods.

The second year consists of a year of compulsory exchange, in the form of a year of study or an internship. Sciences Po Bordeaux has more than 250 academic partner universities in Europe and the rest of the world. Students are also allowed to pursue their studies in France, in a different institution.

The third year is a year of consolidation and orientation to the master's degree.

=== The Second Cycle: Diploma of the Institute of Political studies ===
The Diploma of the Institute of Political Studies is equivalent to a master's degree. The second cycle consists of two years with 60 ETCS per year. Students are required to choose their master, in other word, their specialisation.

During the two years of master, at least one semester is devoted to an internship, which normally lasts for 6 months to prepare students for their future career.

For masters which are research based, an in depth dissertation which lasts for at least 6 months will be required instead of an internship.

There are 4 majors in Sciences Po Bordeaux for the master's degrees and each major consists of different master's degrees as follow:

==== Major in Public Administration and Management ====
Master of Public Administration - Master of Expertise in Public Affairs and Public Business Law (dual degree with the University of Bordeaux)

==== Major in International Affairs ====
Master of Applied Geoeconomics - Master of International Cooperation and Development - Master of Risk Management in Southern Countries - Master of European Integration and Global Development (in partnership with the University of Moscow) - Master of Politics and Development in Africa and the Countries of the South - Master of International Relations (Also Known as the Bordeaux International Relations Degree which is in English) - Master of International Policy - Master of Interdisciplinary and Inter-University Joint Dynamics of the Afriques (with the University of Bordeaux)

==== Major in Politics, Society and Communication ====
Master of European Affairs - Master of Public Affairs and Interest Representation - Master of Journalism - Master of Public Communication and Policy - Master of Policy Professions - Master of Society, Powers and Representations - Master of Metropolitan strategies and governance

==== Major in Management of Projects and Organizations ====
Master of Management of Enterprises and Organizations - Master of Development of Enterprises of the Social and Solidarity Economy - Master of Management of Cultural Projects and Territorial Development - Master of Governance in the Ecological Transition

=== Double Degrees ===
Sciences Po Bordeaux has set up double degrees with its partners around the globe. Students will obtain a double degree from Sciences Po Bordeaux and the partner institution.

There are eight double degrees as follows:
France – Caribbean Network in partnership with University of the West Indies and Guyana of Schoelcher (Martinique) and the University of West Indies of Kingston (Jamaica)
France – Germany, in partnership with the University of Stuttgart
France – Hong Kong, in partnership with the Hong Kong Baptist University
France – Italy, in partnership with the University of Turin
France – Morocco integrated in partnership with the Mundiapolis University of Casablanca
France – Portugal, in partnership with the University of Coimbra
France – Russia in partnership with the Patrice Lumumba Peoples' Friendship University of Russia
France – Spain, in partnership with the Autonomous University of Madrid

=== School of Postgraduate studies ===
Sciences Po Bordeaux is a member of the Doctoral School "Society, Politics, Public Health". This doctoral school is in cooperation with School of Sciences Sociales: Society, Health and Decision from the University of Bordeaux and the previous doctoral school of Political Science from University of Bordeaux and Institut d'Etudes Politiques, Bordeaux.

This school offers doctorates in:

- Political science
- Sociology

=== Other courses offered at Sciences Po Bordeaux ===
==== The preparation of the French Administrative Examination ====
In accordance with its original objective, the IEP contributes to the training of public service executives, both through initial training and through preparations for administrative examinations. There are three specific preparations available for initial training (after the diploma, a bachelor's degree or a master's degree) or in continuing education (employees, civil servants):

- The General Administration Preparation Center (CPAG) for category A civil service recruitment examination;

These examinations included the National School of Administration, the National Institute of Territorial Studies (INET) and the School of Higher Studies in Public Health (EHESP);

- The preparation for the aggregation and CAPES of economics and social sciences.

==== Continuing education ====
IEP has developed a range of continuing education courses for elected officials, executives of public, parapublic and voluntary organizations as well as corporate executives. These included short courses (1 day) or certifying courses (15 days).

These courses are specialised in IEP's areas of expertise: management, international affairs, territorial governance, social action, communication and management.

The courses are taught by IEP professors and qualified external speakers regarding to the subjects.

==== Summer thematic School ====
In order to diversify its training offer, Bordeaux Political Institute has for several years embarked on a policy of developing a summer thematic schools . These training modules are broadly open to societal issues (in the field of international relations as well as defense and internal political or administrative transformations). They also aim to enhance the social science research produced in the two research units : the Center Émile Durkheim and Les Afriques dans le monde (LAM).

In the recent past, these thematic schools have also strengthened a number of institutional partnerships, notably with the French Association of Political Science, the CNRS or the University of Laval. As a privileged partner of the University of Bordeaux for several years, University of Laval is particularly concerned by two recurrent training modules: the School of International Relations (Hautes Études Internationales / Sciences Po Bordeaux) on "The spirit of democracy" (Department of Political Science, University of Laval/ Sciences Po Bordeaux / Free University of Brussels). As such, these two programs are organized alternately in Bordeaux and in the partner institutions.

This training program, funded in part by Sciences Po Bordeaux, also benefits from the regular support of the IdEx Bordeaux International Summer Schools program, the CNRS Thematic Schools Program and the International Cooperation Fund of the Region Nouvelle-Aquitaine.

== Campus ==
Before 1967, Sciences Po Bordeaux was based in Bordeaux itself, at No. 4 Rue du Maréchal-Joffre, the present seat of the Court of First Instance of Bordeaux. Since then, it has been located on the University Estate of Talence-Pessac-Gradignan.

From June 2013 to April 2015, the Bordeaux Institute of Political Studies began a complete restructuring of its premises. A total investment of 26 million euros is allocated to this project with 25 million by the Regional Council of Aquitaine and 1 million by the city of Pessac. This work increases the capacity of the school from 1850 to 3000 students and the total area of the building from 8 400 m^{2} to 15 200 m^{2} . Four new lecture halls were named after Jacques Ellul, Étienne de La Boétie, Aliénor d'Aquitaine and Simone Veil.

== Student's life ==
Sciences Po Bordeaux has a number of student associations and organizations. In 2013, 34 student associations were registered with the school. Four main associations contribute to campus life: the Student Office (BDE), which organizes events, integration activities and the graduation ceremony; the Arts Association (BDA), covering theatre, dance, music, cinema and photography; Erasmix, an association for Erasmus students; and the Sports Association (AS).

Other societies: a Campus Radio, Podcasts, a wine casting club, a law society entrepreneurship association, newspapers, political groups, cultural exchange clubs, student unions, Think tanks....

== Alumni ==
A large number of former students have pursued a successful career in politics, senior civil service, media, scientific research or business in France and around the world. Others have played an important role in the fields of Art or Literature.

=== Politicians ===
- Damien Abad (Member of Parliament, President of the Ain Departmental Council)
- Florent Boudié (Member of Parliament)
- Pascal Canfin (MEP, former Deputy Minister for Development)
- Fanélie Carrey-Conte (Member of Parliament)
- Bernard Cazeneuve ( Class of 1985) (former Prime Minister)
- Paul-Marie Coûteaux (former Member of the European Parliament and President of SIEL)
- François Dagnaud (mayor of the 19th arrondissement of Paris)
- François Deluga (Chairman of the CNFPT, former MP, mayor of Teich)
- Jean Espilondo (former MP, mayor of Anglet)
- David Habib (Member of Parliament)
- Marie Lebec (Member of Parliament)
- David Lisnard (Mayor of Cannes, Vice-President of the General Council of Alpes Maritimes)
- Noël Mamère (former MP, mayor of Begles, ecologist candidate in the 2002 presidential election)
- Marie Récalde (Member of Parliament)
- Laura Slimani (former National President of the Young Socialist Movement, former president of the Young European Socialists)
- Jean Valleix (former Member of Parliament)
- Karfa Diallo (Regional Councillor for Nouvelle-Aquitaine)

=== Senior civil servants ===
- Bernard Boucault (former Prefect of Police of Paris)
- Mathieu Gallet (CEO of Radio France)
- Anne Guerin (State Councilor, President of the Bordeaux Administrative Court of Appeal)
- François Rivasseau (Ambassador of the European Union to the United States)
- Mohamed Berrada (Former Ambassador of Morocco in France)
- Bruno Lasserre (State Councilor, vice-president of the French State Council, former President of the Competition Authority)
- François Toujas (Inspector General of Social Affairs, President of the French Blood Establishment)

=== Business sector ===
- Christian Blanc (former CEO of Air France and RATP, former member of parliament, former Secretary of State for Development of the Capital Region)
- Bertrand Belinguier (former general manager of GAN and former president of the PMU)
- Éric Ducournau (Chief Executive Officer of Pierre Fabre-Dermocosmetique Laboratories)
- Mathieu Gallet (former CEO of Radio France)
- Nicolas de Tavernost (Chairman of the Board of the M6 television network)
- Jean-Louis Triaud (wine grower and president of FC Girondins de Bordeaux)

=== Journalists ===
- Florent Gautreau (newspaper in France 2)
- Thomas Hugues (journalist at France 5)
- Éric Jean-Jean (host and presenter of radio and TV)
- Anne-Sophie Lapix (journalist at France 2)
- Martin Weill (journalist at the Petit Journal of Canal+, then on TMC in the daily Quotidien)
