= Heïdi Sevestre =

French glaciologist

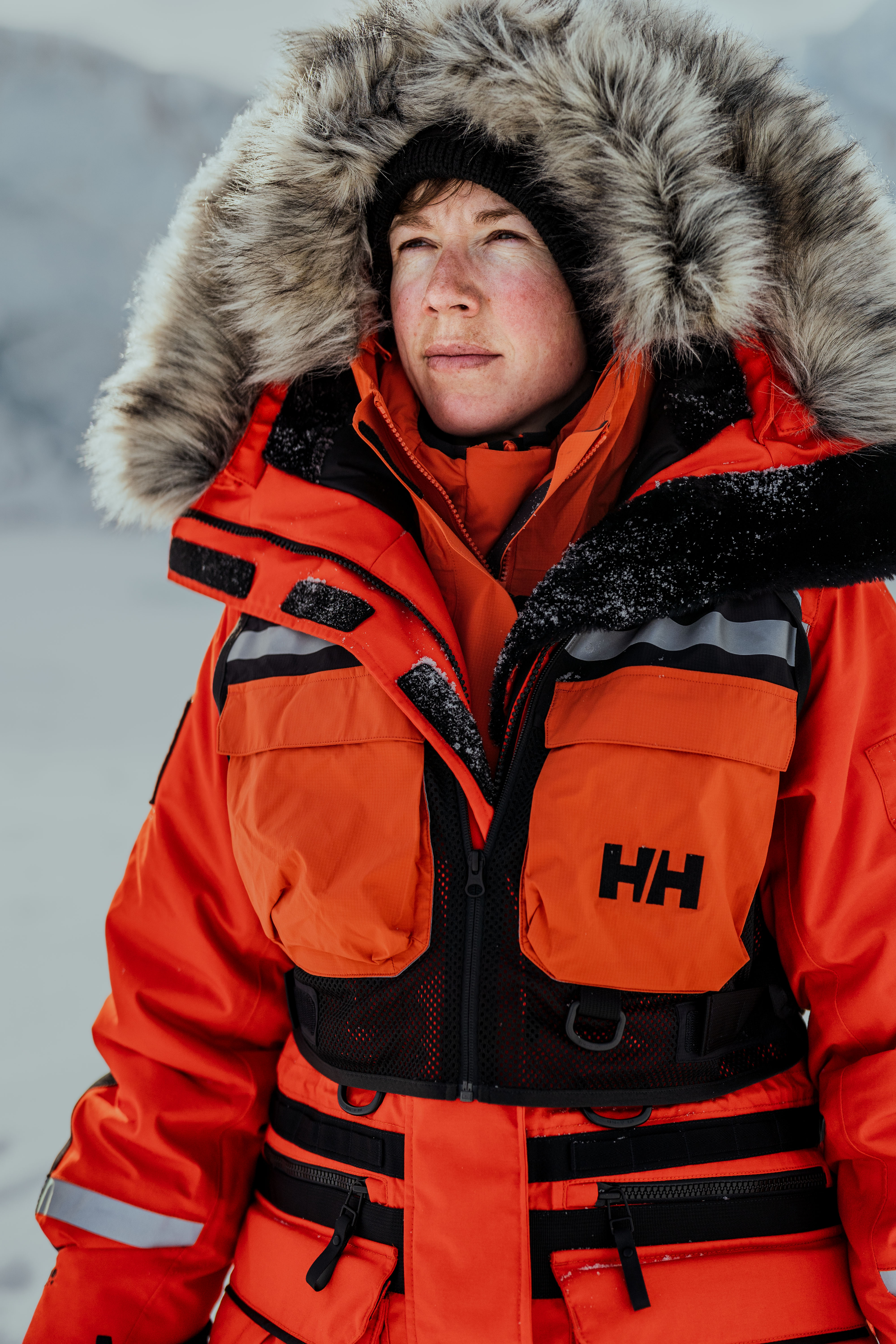
- Born: Heïdi Sevestre; 11 March 1988 (age 38); Annecy, Haute-Savoie, France
- Citizenship: French
- Education: University of Oslo; University of Svalbard; Jean Moulin University Lyon III
- Occupations: Glaciologist, explorer, lecturer
- Awards: Explorers Club 50 (2026); Veolia Foundation Environmental Book Prize (2024); Shackleton Medal (2022); European Young Leader (2024); Prix du Rayonnement Français Environnement (2023)
- Scientific career
- Fields: Glaciology
- Institutions: University Centre in Svalbard; University of St Andrews
- Website: heidisevestre.com

Heïdi Sevestre (born on 11 March 1988 in Annecy, Haute-Savoie) is a French glaciologist.

== Biography ==
=== Early life ===
Born in 1988 in Annecy, Haute-Savoie, and grew up in Gruffy, near Semnoz, the Bauges massif and the Aravis Range. At the age of 17, she participated in a Chamonix–Zermatt ski expedition for the TSR program Passe-moi les jumelles, during which she developed an interest in glaciers.

=== Education ===
She earned her scientific baccalaureate with a specialization in biology and ecology from ISETA, formerly an agricultural secondary school in Poisy. She subsequently attended the École supérieure européenne d'ingénierie de l'espace rural, also in Poisy. In late 2011, she began doctoral studies at the University Centre in Svalbard. She was admitted to the doctoral programme of the Faculty of Mathematics and Natural Sciences at the University of Oslo, where her research was supervised by Douglas I. Benn of UNIS and Jon Ove Hagen of the University of Oslo. Her thesis examined the dynamics of glacier surges and involved fieldwork in Ny-Ålesund, Tempelfjorden, and Van Mijenfjorden. She completed her thesis in October 2015, after publishing in the Journal of Glaciology and the Journal of Geophysical Research.

=== Early career ===
Shortly after defending her thesis in 2015, Sevestre spent two months in Antarctica studying the Larsen C Ice Shelf as part of the MiDAS project. The project was led by Bryn Hubbard of Aberystwyth University and Adrian Luckman of Swansea University, with support from the British Antarctic Survey.

In December 2017, she appeared on the cover of Science magazine. In April 2018, she became a postdoctoral fellow at the University of St Andrews. She has also served as a guest lecturer at the University Centre in Svalbard.

=== Expeditions ===
==== Climate Sentinels (2021) ====
In April 2021, Sevestre crossed Spitsbergen with scientists Anne Elina Flink, Nina Adjanin, Silje Smith-Johnsen, Alia Khan, and Dorothée Vallot. The team collected snow samples to study how pollution contributes to glacier melting in the Arctic.

==== Arctic Ascent (2022) ====
In 2022, Sevestre participated in a six-week expedition to eastern Greenland. During the expedition, climbers Alex Honnold and Hazel Findlay completed the first ascent of Ingmikortilaq, a 1,200-metre monolith. Sevestre conducted measurements to study the effects of climate change on the Greenland ice sheet.

In July 2024, she completed a 1,500-kilometre kite-ski expedition across the Greenland ice sheet with French adventurer Matthieu Tordeur, travelling from Ilulissat to Qaanaaq.

In August 2024, she joined an expedition to Uganda to study the tropical glaciers of the Rwenzori Mountains.

==== Under Antarctica (October 2025–January 2026) ====
Between October 2025 and January 2026, Sevestre and Tordeur undertook an approximately 4,000-kilometre kite-ski expedition across Antarctica. Their route extended from Novolazarevskaya Antarctic station to Union Glacier Camp and passed through the South Pole of Inaccessibility and the geographic South Pole. Sevestre became the first woman to complete this crossing of Antarctica.

The expedition was conducted under the auspices of UNESCO and the Decade of Action for Cryospheric Sciences. Using two ground-penetrating radars, the team mapped the ice sheet to study the effects of climate change. They departed on 3 November 2025 and reached the Soviet Pole of Inaccessibility on 14 December. An educational programme developed by the association Témoins Polaires followed the expedition and involved more than 300,000 students from 41 countries.

== Science communication ==
Sevestre has worked on climate education and science communication. She hosted young climate ambassadors from the Gers departmental council in Svalbard and organized a visit to UNIS for students from ISETA. She supports the La Rochelle-based project "Demain, c'est nous", created by François Bernard, a technology teacher at the Fénelon Notre-Dame school.

In December 2019, she gave a TEDx talk in La Rochelle on making climate science clearer and more accessible.

Sevestre formerly served as director of scientific communication for the International Cryosphere Climate Initiative. She was also appointed project coordinator for the Arctic Monitoring and Assessment Programme and is a member of the International Explorers Club.

== Books ==
- With François Bernard, preface by Cyril Dion, Demain, c'est nous: Plaidoyer pour l'éducation au changement climatique, éditions du Faubourg, 2023, 214 pages. ISBN 978-2493594181.
- With Isabelle Marrier, Sentinelle du climat, HarperCollins, 2023, 224 pages. ISBN 979-1033916932.
- Sentinelle: Voyage au coeur des glaciers, HarperCollins, 2025, 144 pages. ISBN 9791033924791.

== Television and radio ==
=== Terres extrêmes ===
From 2017 to 2019, Sevestre presented the documentary series, Terres extrêmes, for the French public channel France 5.

Produced by Pernel Média, the series examined natural phenomena and human adaptation in different regions. The episodes were:

- Episode 1: "Iceland", directed by Laurent Lichtenstein.
- Episode 2: "Chile", directed by Laurent Lichtenstein.
- Episode 3: "California", directed by Laurent Lichtenstein and Marina Boyenval.
- Episode 4: "Japan", directed by Frédérique Mergey.
- Episode 5: "The Green Hell", directed by Laurent Lichtenstein and Liza Fanjeaux.
- Episode 6: "The Emirates Facing the Desert", directed by Lila Salmi and Jean-Luc Guidoin.

=== Il faut sauver ===
In late 2019, Sevestre began working on Il faut sauver, a television programme created by Laurent Lichtenstein and Nicolas Plain and broadcast by Ushuaïa TV. The first episode aired on 20 February 2020.

=== Other appearances ===
- France 2: La banquise Eldorado, Svalbard, 2013.
- Time TV Portugal: Corrida contra o Tempo, race against, 2015.
- France 5: Vue sur terre Norvège, 2015/2016.
- Time magazine, United States: The Cold Life, 2016.
- National Geographic Netflix: One Strange Rock in Svalbard, episode 1.
- A Day in the Life of Earth, Les Forces de la Terre, United Kingdom, filmed in Iceland in 2018.
- Sur le front des glaciers with Hugo Clément, March 2020.
- Ushuaïa TV: En Terre ferme with Jean-Louis Étienne, April 2021.
- National Geographic: On the Edge with Alex Honnold and Hazel Findlay in Greenland, 2022.
- TV5 Monde: Pourquoi on se bat, episode 2, by Camille Étienne and Solal Moisan, April 2023.
- France 2: Les Super-pouvoirs de l'océan, with Hugo Clément and Léa Salamé, November 2023.
- LCP: Heïdi's Ice by Pierre Dugowson: four episodes whose objective is to follow the scientist in her work in order to raise public awareness about climate disruption, December 2023.
- France 5: Échappées belles: Dolomites, l'Italie des sommets with Ismaël Khelifa, January 2024.
- Les Others: Les baladeurs: Les larmes du glacier Conejeras, an episode about the tropical glacier located in Colombia, sacred to Indigenous populations. It presents several expeditions, from 2019 to its recent disappearance.
- Glaciers d'Arctique, état des lieux, by Pierre Dugowson, 2025.
- TF1+ / Ushuaïa TV: Play4Life: the committed musical event that reveals the urgency of taking action for the living world, with J.-M. Jancovici, Marine Calmet, Gilles Boeuf, and Olivier Hamant, September 2025.

=== Segments on France Culture ===
Since 1 September 2023, Sevestre has presented "Le biais d'Heïdi Sevestre", a weekly segment about glaciers and climate change on Les Matins de France Culture.

== Awards and distinctions ==
- Winner in 2022 of the first Shackleton Medal for the Protection of the polar regions, awarded by an international jury of polar experts chaired by Professor Lewis Dartnell at the Royal Geographical Society in London.
- Grand Prize for Environmental Influence, an award presented in March 2023 by Olivier Poivre d'Arvor, ambassador for the poles and maritime issues.
- Vakita Awards: Scientist of the Year 2023.
- 2024 Environmental Book Prize from the Veolia Foundation for her book Sentinelle du climat.
- Honorary citizen of the city of Nice and recipient of the city medal, presented by the mayor, Christian Estrosi, on the occasion of the 2025 United Nations Ocean Conference.
