= Quarian =

Fictional species in the Mass Effect series

- Mass Effect race
- A typical male quarian, as presented in Mass Effect 3
- First appearance: Mass Effect (2007)
- Created by: BioWare

In-universe information
- Home world: Rannoch

The Quarians are a fictional extraterrestrial humanoid species in the Mass Effect multimedia franchise developed by BioWare and published by Electronic Arts. The quarians and their backstory are introduced in the first Mass Effect through the companion character Tali'Zorah, with quarian society as a whole playing a more prominent role in its sequels.

Within the Mass Effect universe, the quarians' backstory represents a cornerstone of the series' recurring theme of conflict between synthetic and organic life. They perpetually wander the Milky Way galaxy as a nomadic people after they were driven from their homeworld Rannoch by a synthetic race of their own creation, the geth. Shunned by the rest of interstellar society for unleashing a potentially dangerous collective of self-aware artificial intelligence (AI) lifeforms onto the galaxy, the quarians harbor a desire to retake their homeworld from the geth, which is the basis of a major storyline in the original Mass Effect video game trilogy. The quarians' history of struggle with the geth, immunodeficient physiology and status as a marginalized community within series lore have generated discussion among commentators.

== Background ==
Approximately three centuries before the events of Mass Effect, the quarians created the geth as an AI workforce to serve as a cheap and efficient source of manual labor. Once the geth advanced from their rudimentary origins to a more sophisticated collective intelligence, achieved through a shared neural network developed by their creators with the intention of enabling their servants to carry out more complex tasks by pooling together processing power, they began displaying initial signs of self-awareness and start asking their creators existential questions. The quarians panicked and attempted to broadcast a signal to shut down all geth; in response, the geth refused to accept commands concerning their deactivation and rebelled against their creators, successfully driving them into exile following a war.

The surviving quarians wander the galaxy as the Migrant Fleet, a massive flotilla of ships of various roles and sizes, some of which are salvaged or secondhand vessels sustained with recycled technology. Other species tend to look down on the quarians, seeing them as undesirable scavengers or condemning them for allowing the geth to emerge as a potential threat to the rest of the galaxy.

== Concept and design ==
Tali'Zorah or Tali, a companion of Commander Shepard, served as the only example of a quarian in the first Mass Effect. Tali's initial concept drawings were finished before the geth's final design, though their "flashlight head" look thematically informed the aesthetic of her helmet's appearance along with the rest of the quarians'. While Tali is the only quarian squadmate available to the player throughout the series, another quarian character dubbed "The Crazy Quarian King" by BioWare senior staff member Mac Walters was originally planned for inclusion in Mass Effect 2. In an interview with GameSpot, Walters explained that the concept behind the character originated as an inspiration from an unhinged Irish character portrayed by David O'Hara in the 1995 film Braveheart, and that this quarian character is meant to be middle-aged and whimsical about his desire for revenge against the geth for the deaths of his loved ones and comrades.

The quarian Migrant Fleet is envisioned to be over 50,000 ships strong with a distinctly refugee feel and all available space crammed with cargo, akin to a caravan filled with hoarded goods. The liveship, a large spherical vessel designated as food supply production centers for the quarian civilization, is designed to stand out among the many ships of the Migrant Fleet. Its spherical design is intended to communicate its effectiveness in maximizing the quarians' yield of cultivated crops. Other ships are intentionally designed to show they have been lived in for a long time: one type of ship has a central ring at its heart, with cargo modules strapped on to them to show quarian ingenuity when they run out of living space.

A section of the plot of Mass Effect 3 takes place in Rannoch, the quarian homeworld. The developmental team wanted to create a world which seemed consistent with two architectural styles: the aesthetic of the quarian Migrant Fleet, and the utilitarian geth architecture. The team decided to retain an industrial style for Rannoch's quarian environments; it is supplemented with modular stainless steel sections inspired by the Lloyd's building in London's main financial district, with no hard line between interior and exterior environments as they are meant to blend. The team wanted to show that the geth had kept Rannoch in an almost-pristine state throughout their occupation of the planet, and so refrained from depicting any pre-existing battle damage in the planet's environments.

Prior to the reveal of Tali's face in Mass Effect 3, the facial features of a quarian were uncertain as they are never seen without their visors within the game engine. BioWare artists regularly drafted variations on Tali's face throughout the series' development, and the decision on whether to provide a definitive reveal of her face was a long-standing internal debate. Concept artist Matt Rhodes in particular envisioned the quarians to be more alien-looking, with white skin, cat-like eyes and a lack of hair, and thought it would be a good opportunity "to push players to the edge" by subverting their expectations of what Tali's true appearance would be like. The final design for a quarian's face, as conveyed by a modified stock photo depicting an unmasked Tali, has human-like features and hair but with all-white eyes.

== Attributes ==
=== Biology ===
Quarians are largely human-shaped. They have distinctly curved lower legs that make for a seemingly digitigrade appearance. Quarians are generally shorter and of slighter build compared to humans. Their hands consist of a thumb and two fingers, while their feet have two large, prominent toes. Like the turians, quarian biochemistry is based on dextro-amino acids, which sets them apart from most other species, including humanity, which are based on levo-amino acids. They cannot eat human food, or ingest any substance that is based on levo-amino acids.

According to series lore, quarians have compromised immune systems due to the relative lack of microbes in their homeworld, which further atrophies after living aboard sterile starships for generations, to the point where their body's ability to fight diseases is compromised or entirely absent. As a result, the quarians always wear their environmental suits, which are built from a scavenged assortment of materials, and their faces obscured by the visors on their helmets. Sexual contact with other species is a significant and potentially fatal biological hazard for a quarian.

=== Culture ===
The quarian government is depicted as an amalgamation of ship-based representative councils and military dictatorship. Fleet operations are overseen by a judicial review body known as the Admiralty Board, which consists of a panel of admirals who form determinations which are legally binding through consensus, and it is empowered to overrule the civilian government during times of emergency. Due to the circumstances of their living conditions, the Migrant Fleet operates on a subsistence-centric economy, with much of their efforts directed towards the perpetual salvage and repair of used technology and the cultivation of essentials such as food, water and air, with little infrastructure for heavy industries. The quarians live on a vegan diet out of practical, as opposed to ethical, concerns: this is because the amount of water required to sustain livestock is exponentially more than the amount plant life need to grow, and that water supplies are conserved very carefully onboard starships.

Because the quarian government is obliged to provide essentials and medical support for every individual, its leadership strategically determines the course of the Fleet to bring in resources and income. All young quarians must participate in a rite of passage to adulthood known as a Pilgrimage, where they leave their home ships and experience the world outside the Migrant Fleet, and may not return until they have recovered something of value to bring back to their communities. The quarians as a community are generally unwelcome in much of explored space, though individual quarians often manage to secure work as miners, engineers and technicians on numerous worlds by leveraging their people's reputation for their knowledge and skill with technology. The Migrant Fleet has at its disposal several hundred warships to serve as its defense, but it is not considered a credible threat by other civilizations due to the precarious existence and rag-tag nature of the Fleet as a whole.

Keelah se'lai, a well known quarian phrase within the Mass Effect universe which means "by the home world I hope to see one day", refers to the quarians' desire to return to their homeworld, which had been under geth occupation since their defeat.

== Appearances ==
The quarians are first introduced through Tali, who is the only representative of her people to appear in the first Mass Effect. The quarians are also featured in the backstory of the game's primary antagonistic faction, the geth. During her pilgrimage journey, Tali encounters a geth unit by chance and disables it for study, as the geth rarely venture outside of geth space. When she recovers information from the unit's memory core, she unwittingly discovers a connection between a geth faction and the turian agent Saren Arterius, who answers directly to the Citadel Council. Upon her arrival at the Citadel, Tali intends to trade the information in return for a safe refuge from a powerful information broker known as the Shadow Broker, but is saved by Commander Shepard from a rogue agent of the Shadow Broker who attempts to silence her permanently.

Quarian culture and society is depicted with greater detail in the tie-in novel Mass Effect: Ascension, and in the main series sequel Mass Effect 2. Numerous quarian characters are introduced in Mass Effect 2, with several playing prominent roles for the remainder of the original trilogy's narrative arc. For example, Shepard first learns of a connection between the abductions of human colonists and a mysterious insectoid race known as the Collectors from Veetor'Nara, a quarian who resides in a remote human settlement as part of his Pilgrimage journey, who escaped the attention of the Collectors while all the other humans were taken. Tali is once again available for recruitment as a squad member; her backstory and side mission explore the intricacies of the quarian political and legal system, as well as the rise of irredentism throughout quarian society with regards to the reclamation of their homeworld Rannoch.

In Mass Effect 3, Shepard is tasked with securing an alliance with the quarians to assist in the war effort against the Reapers; in return, the quarian leadership request Shepard's assistance in battling the geth occupation of Rannoch. During the course of the war, Shepard may access a geth server to disable geth fighter squadrons which are assaulting quarian lifeships, where the truth about the origins of the geth rebellion and the ensuing conflict from their perspective may be revealed. At the end of the story arc, players are presented with three possible outcomes to resolve the geth and quarian conflict. Two of these, where Shepard sides with either the geth or the quarians which results in the apparent extinction of the other race, are available to all players regardless of any prior decisions being carried over up to that point in the narrative. The third resolution to this conflict, a peaceful ceasefire between the two sides, requires a specific number of choices to be made by the player in both Mass Effect 2 and Mass Effect 3, most of which are made during entirely optional events. Quarians of both genders and various classes are also available as player characters in the multiplayer mode of Mass Effect 3.

The quarians do not appear in Mass Effect: Andromeda; instead, the story of a contingent of quarian colonists is told in the game's tie-in novel Annihilation, where they form the majority of the colonists on board the ark ship Keelah Siyah, which is bound for the Andromeda Galaxy as part of the Andromeda Initiative.

=== In other media ===
The quarians are featured as a themed skin for Anthem player characters, released on November 7, 2019, in commemoration of "N7 Day", an informal celebration of the Mass Effect franchise observed annually.

== Reception and analysis ==
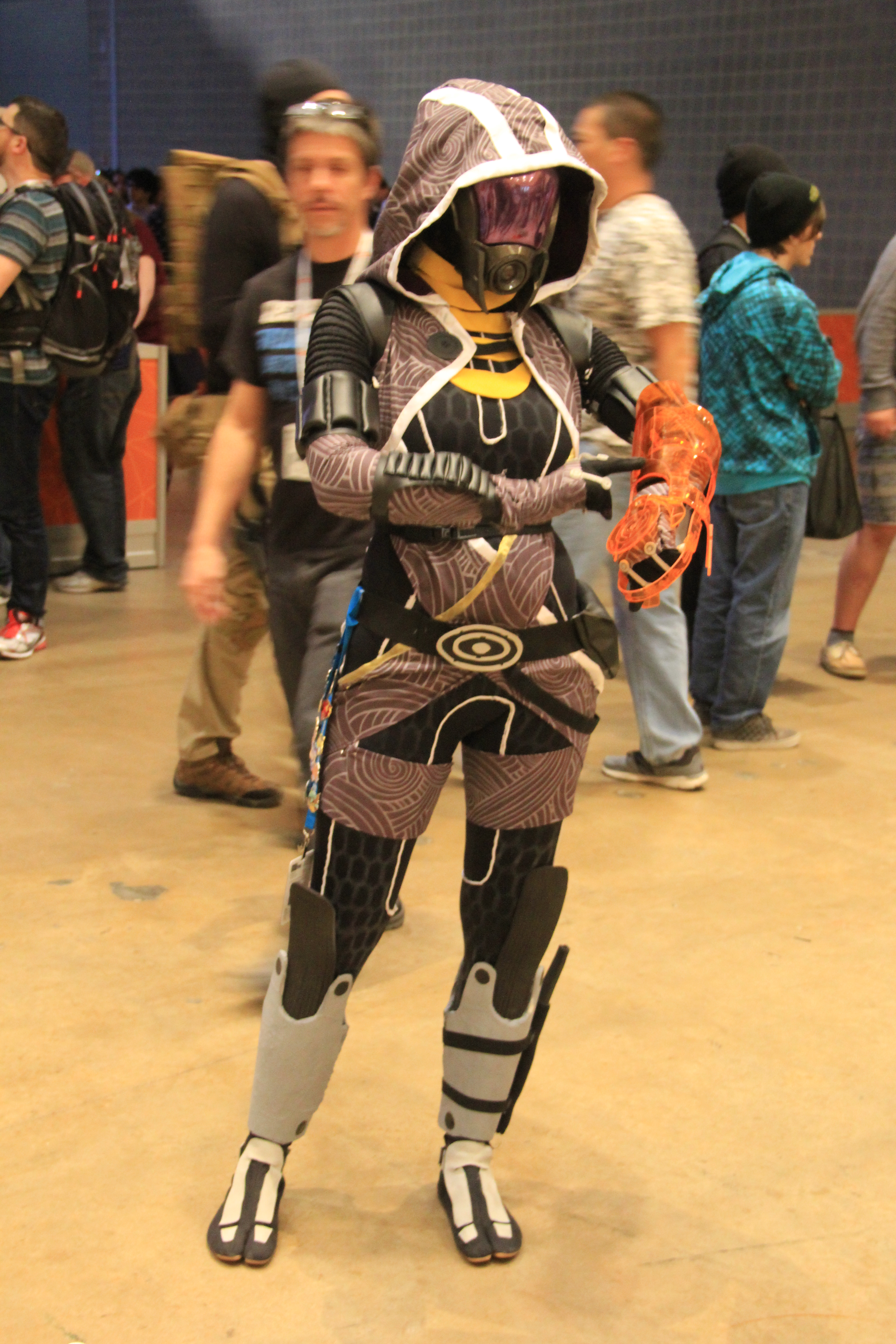
A cosplayer portraying Tali'Zorah, the most prominent quarian character in the Mass Effect series.

According to player statistics released by BioWare for Mass Effect 3 in March 2013, 27% sided with the quarians, 37% with the geth, and 36% achieved a truce between both sides.

Several commentators have discussed the quarians within the context of intercultural friction. Kurt Kalata from Hardcore Gamer 101 noted the similarity of the quarian's plight to the central premise of the 2004 remake of Battlestar Galactica. Kalata also found their conflict with the geth as engrossing and compelling as the Syreen and Mycon conflict of Star Control II. Gerald Vorhees described the cultural and political tensions between the geth and quarians, exemplified by the tensions between Tali and the geth unit known as Legion, to be one example out of several scenarios throughout the series which highlight its function as cultural technologies which legitimizes neo-liberal multiculturalist ideology. Citing Gayatri Chakravorty Spivak’s ‘Can the Subaltern Speak?’, Vanessa Erat discussed the quarians as an aspect of what she perceived to be BioWare's attempt at recreating past imperialist-colonialist tensions while conforming to an elitist, anthropocentric perspective. Erat posited the quarian's conflict with the geth within the context of the Arab–Israeli conflict, and highlighted their self-inflicted diaspora, questionable positioning of remembered history and the revelation of historical irregularities when combined with correlating characteristics. Erat opined that since the quarians are seemingly evaluated based upon their worth to humanity in Mass Effect 3, she posed a question as to whether the quarians, as a "silenced" marginalized community at the fringes of the galactic society, are ultimately granted autonomous voices in the game design, and the extent to which players could enforce their agency when Shepard intervenes in their war with the geth. On the other hand, Thomas Faller noted that Mass Effect 3 acknowledges the geth as equal to the quarians and gives players the possibility to choose an artificial intelligence over organic life at the climax of the war on Rannoch, ultimately putting synthetic and organic beings on an equal footing. Moreover, the game also gives players the chance to bring peace to both races and to end the long-lasting conflict.

In a paper about "cripping strategies" in his reading of the Mass Effect series for disability representation, Adan Jerreat-Poole observed that quarian culture "radically repositions" disability and technology to be valued and shared embodiments. He remarked that illness and disability are ever-present in quarian society, which produces an interdependent community where illness is intertwined with what he described as "affect, embodiment, and community in ways that underscore and celebrate both the interdependence of disability and the possibility for illness to enable radical forms of connection". To Jerreat-Poole, the quarians' state of being breaks down the boundaries between machine, person, and other lifeforms, and at the same time challenges the perspective of a settler colonial power fantasy about the concepts of humanity and independence. Since the quarians are seemingly empowered by contagion and community-minded interdependence, Jerreat-Poole suggested that they offer a compelling mode of what a functional "crip" community would be like, where intimacy is associated with illness, and emotional vulnerability is tied to physical and biological vulnerability.

Jerreat-Poole also noted that numerous aesthetic aspects of quarian culture "superficially borrows from a mish-mash of Western stereotypes of "othered" races to create a patchwork "exotic" body of colour", citing for example headscarves worn by quarian females and the "Pilgrimage" rite to be evocative of stereotypes of Islamic religious practices, and the manner in which Tali's voice actress described her character's accent using a derogatory term for the Romani people. He argued that an alien body which represents "exoticified people of colour", with reference to model Hammasa Kohistani's likeness being used as the visual reference for Tali's unmasked face, is "disturbing and harmful", particularly when juxtaposed with real-world realities of discrimination on the basis of race, religion, and migrant status, as well as the history and present threat of war.

Analyzing the various romance options available to players in Mass Effect 2, Megan Blyth said that the exclusivity of a quarian character as a sexual partner for a male Shepard reveal assumptions about gender underlying the game's development, which in her view imply that the game's designers anticipated differing standards of what affirms a character's attractiveness between players performing as a male or female Shepard, and that in this case those playing a female Shepard do not have access to a vulnerable, human-like alien romantic interest like her male counterpart. Eva Zekany from Central European University noted that quarians conform to conventional human beauty standards despite their obscured facial features, and that an interspecies romance between humans and quarians present little challenge or difficulty as long as the former is careful with quarian customs of bodily care due to their fragile immune systems.

Following the COVID-19 pandemic, commentators noted similarities between the plight of the quarians, who were forced to wear masks and be hyper-aware of potential risks from infection, and the experiences of people during lockdowns.

== Cultural references ==
The quarian phrase keelah se'lai has been referenced by Amazon's Echo device; it is triggered as an automated answer if the phrase "Does this unit have a soul?" is spoken.

An advanced persistent threat (APT) group which targets various states' Ministries of Foreign Affairs as well as telecommunication companies in Africa and the Middle East since the late 2010s utilizes custom backdoors as part of its modus operandi; one variant which was used to target the Syrian Ministry of Foreign Affairs in 2012, as well as the US State Department in 2013 is termed "Quarian".
