= Yann Barthès =

French journalist and producer (born 1974)

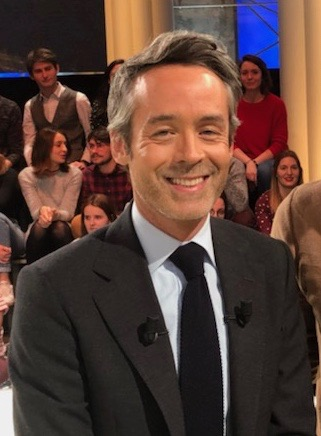
- Barthès in January 2019
- Born: Yann Romain Barthès; 9 October 1974 (age 52); Chambéry, France
- Education: Bordeaux Montaigne University
- Occupation: Television journalist
- Years active: 2002–present

Yann Romain Barthès (born 9 October 1974) is a French journalist, TV presenter and producer, best known for hosting the television segment Le Petit Journal and the TV talk show Quotidien.

== Early life and career ==
Barthes was born on 9 octobre 1974 in Chambéry, France. He initially studied English at the University of Savoy in Chambéry before switching to journalism, which he studied from 1995 and 1998 at the Institute of Information Science and Communication at the Bordeaux-Montaigne University, in Bordeaux.

Barthès became a journalist in 2002 on the show + Clair, a weekly program dealing with media issues, which aired on Saturday afternoons on Canal +.

In 2004, he joined the TV programme Le Grand Journal, where he presented a nightly segment entitled Le Petit Journal People (The Little News Report - Celebrities). From 2007, he also presented Le Petit Journal Actu (The Little News Report - Current Events). In 2011, Le Petit Journal became a separate program, with Barthès as the main presenter.

On 9 May 2016, it was announced that Barthès would be leaving the show after 23 June 2016 and that Barthès and his team would begin two new programmes to be broadcast on the channels TMC and TF1 later in the year, including the daily show Quotidien. Quotidien was first broadcast on TMC on 12 September 2016.

== Personal life ==
Yann Barthès and his partner Laurent Bon are known for keeping their private life out of the media. He has not publicly disclosed details of his family or romantic relationships, and he has maintained this discretion alongside his producing partner Laurent Bon, with whom he co-runs the production company Bangumi.

Comedian Panayotis Pascot, who was part of the Quotidien team, has said that Yann Barthès and producer Laurent Bon together taught him a great deal.

== TV shows ==
2004 - 2016 :

- Le Petit Journal - Canal+

Since 2016 :

- Quotidien - TMC
- Quotidien Express - TMC

Variations of Quotidien :

- Les Q d'Or (2016) - TMC
- Le Tattoo Show (2017) - TMC
- Le Toutou Matou Show (2017) - TMC
- Le Tif Show (2017) - TMC
- Le Summer Show (2017) - TMC
- Les Q d'Or 2017 (2017) - TMC

=== Substitute hosts ===
When Yann Barthès is absent from Quotidien on TMC, he is replaced (in French: "joker" ) at short notice:

- 26 January 2017: with Barthès ill, the show is shared among its reporters, including Vincent Dedienne, Hugo Clément and Valentine Oberti.
- 19 January 2018: Martin Weill stands in.
- 13 March 2020: Weill stands in again.
- 9 October 2026: Salhia Brakhlia, who rejoined the team in September, presents an edition alone.

==== Cartoon remplacement ====
Separately, on 18 June 2015, during the Annecy International Animation Film Festival, Le Petit Journal aired an entirely animated edition on Canal+, with Barthès appearing as a cartoon version of himself.
