= Martin Weill =

French television journalist (born 1987)

- Born: 11 April 1987 (age 39); Paris, France
- Education: École supérieure de journalisme de Lille
- Occupation: Television journalist

Martin Jean Weill (born 11 April 1987 in Paris, France) is a French television journalist. Since September 2016 he has worked as a foreign correspondent for the nightly news and entertainment programme Quotidien, broadcast on TMC. From 2013 to 2016 he worked in a similar role on Canal+'s Le Petit Journal.

== Biography ==
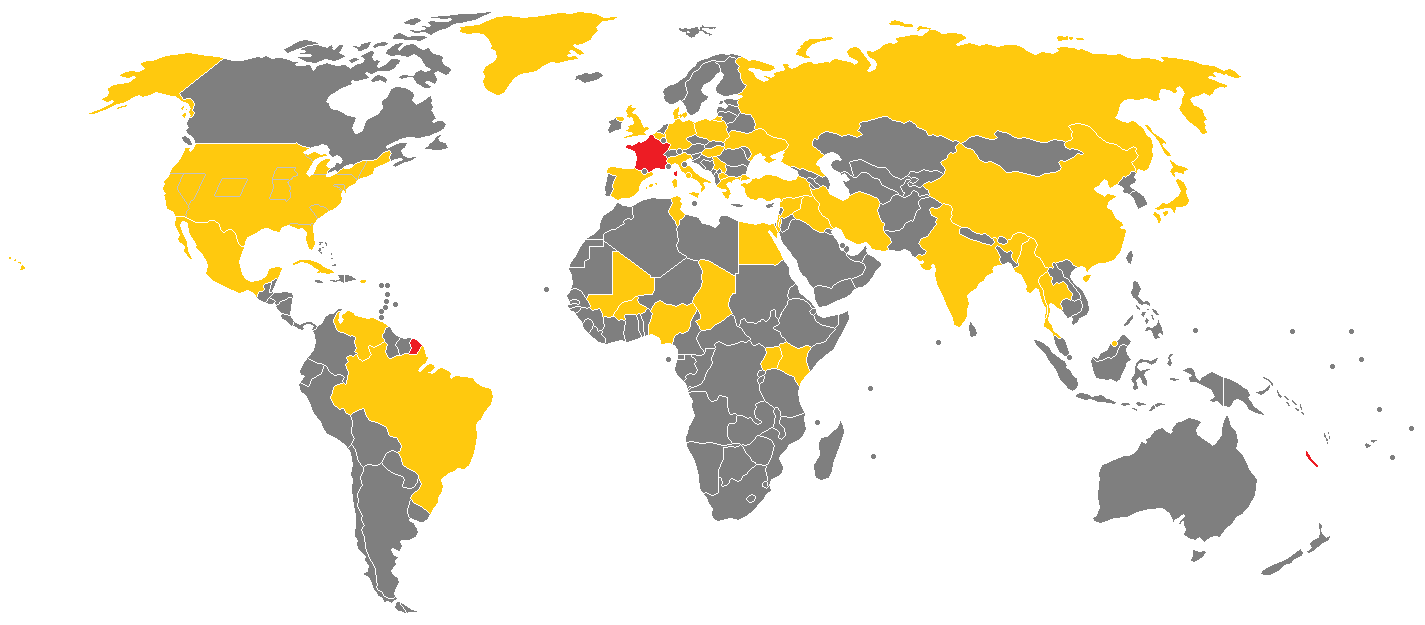
Countries visited by Martin Weill.

Son of Pierre-Alain Weill, a printer, entrepreneur and socialist local politician, Martin Weill studied history at Paris-Sorbonne University and went on to study at the Institut d'études politiques de Bordeaux and at the University of Cardiff before graduating from the École supérieure de journalisme de Lille. From there he began his journalistic career, aged 26, at the French national television channel TF1, producing reports for the 1 pm and 8 pm news programmes.

From September 2012 to June 2013, Weill worked as a reporter for Canal+'s Sunday afternoon programme Le Supplément. Since 26 August 2013 he has worked as a special correspondent for the nightly news and entertainment programme Le Petit Journal, hosted by Yann Barthès. He has reported from a large number of countries around the world; in January 2016 it was reported that he had accumulated 553 803 kilometres of travel in a little over two years of working for Le Petit Journal, or the equivalent of 14 trips around the world. Weill speaks English, French, Spanish, and some Portuguese.

In the days following the November 2015 Paris terror attacks, Le Petit Journal sent its reporters on to the streets of Paris to document the public's reactions. Weill recorded an interview with a six-year-old boy named Brandon, who, when asked if he understood why the attackers had done what they had done, responded: "Yes, because they're really, really mean. Bad guys are not very nice. And we have to be really careful because we have to change houses." Videos of the interview went viral in both the French- and English-speaking world. Brandon and his father were later invited to Le Petit Journal's studio to be interviewed once again by Weill and Barthès.

== Criticisms ==
The association Acrimed strongly criticized Le Petit Journal's international reports, arguing that there was no real merit in the number of kilometers traveled or countries visited, and that "the omnipresence of reporter Martin Weill" was not very compatible with delivering quality international information.

In early December 2017, journalist Nassira El Moaddem accused Hugo Clément and Martin Weill of "harassment," "sexism," and "racism" during their time as students together in 2012.
