= Sergio Parisse =

Italy international rugby union player

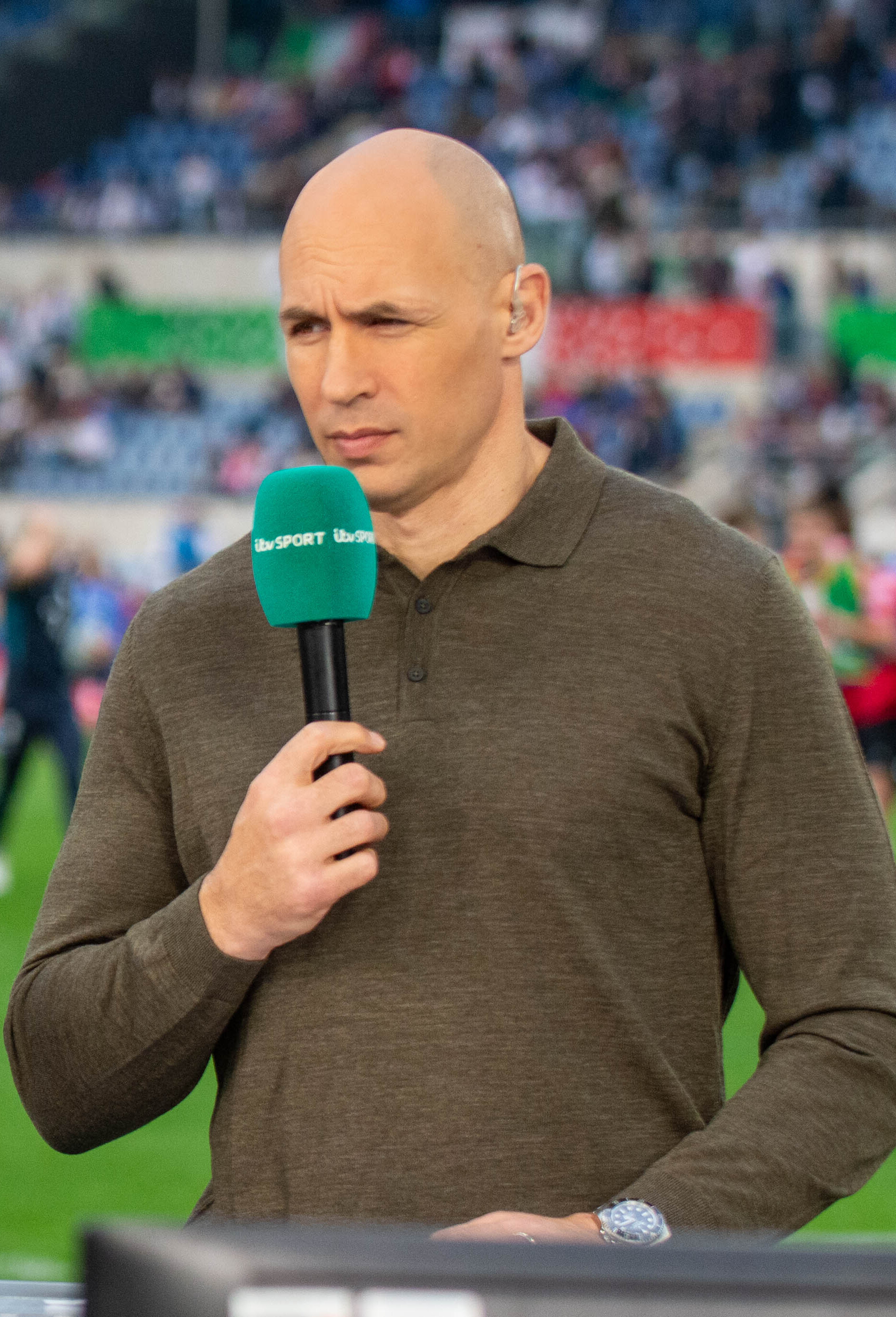
- Parisse with ITV Sport in 2026
- Born: Sergio Francesco Parisse; 12 September 1983 (age 43) La Plata, Buenos Aires, Argentina
- Height: 1.96 m (6 ft 5 in)
- Weight: 113 kg (17 st 11 lb; 249 lb)

Rugby union career
- Position(s): Number Eight, Flanker
- Current team: Toulon (lineout coach)
Amateur team(s)
| Years | Team | Apps | (Points) |
| 2002–2003 | Universitario de La Plata | | |
Senior career
| Years | Team | Apps | (Points) |
| 2003–2005 | Benetton Treviso | 64 | (55) |
| 2005–2019 | Stade Français | 265 | (238) |
| 2019–2023 | Toulon | 65 | (40) |
| Total | | 395 | (333) |
International career
| Years | Team | Apps | (Points) |
| 2002–2019 | Italy | 142 | (83) |
Coaching career
- Years: Team
- 2023–: Toulon (Lineout)

Sergio Francesco Parisse (Italian pronunciation: [ˈsɛrdʒo paˈrisse]; born 12 September 1983) is an Italian-Argentine former rugby union player. He is currently the lineout coach for French club Toulon. He played for the Italy national team from 2002 until the 2019 Rugby World Cup. Parisse is Italy's most-capped player, and currently the seventh most-capped player of all time. He was the first Italian rugby union player to be nominated for the IRB International Player of the Year, in 2008 and again in 2013. Parisse is widely considered one of the greatest number eights of the modern era, and among the greatest Italian rugby player of all time. He also holds the joint record of playing in five Rugby World Cups.

== Early life ==
Parisse was born in La Plata, capital of Province of Buenos Aires, Argentina, to Italian parents. His father, also Sergio, played for L'Aquila Rugby, with whom he won the Italian club championship in 1967 before his job with the Italtel took him to Argentina in 1970. His family spoke Italian at home and every year Sergio would go on holiday to Italy.

== Career ==
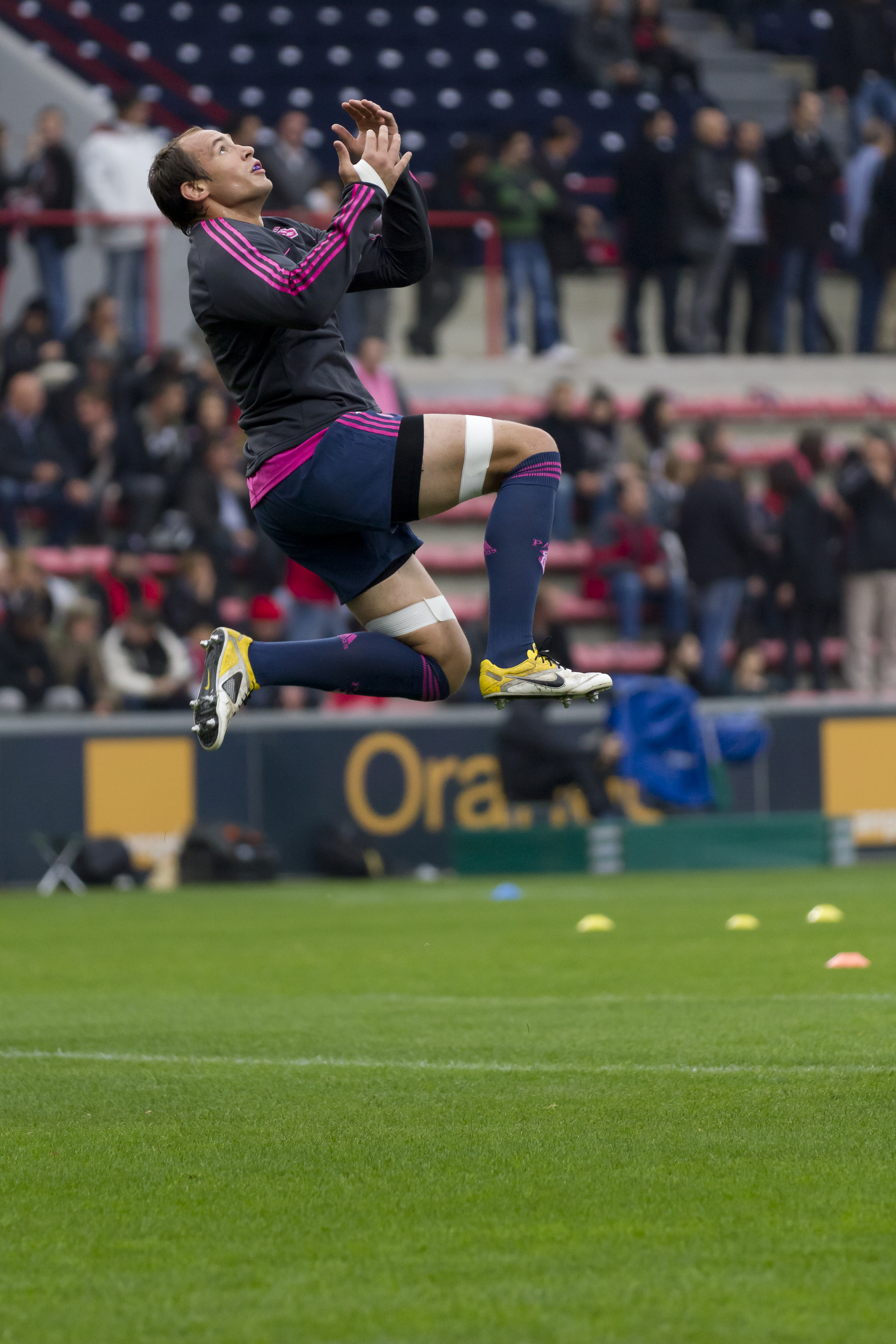
Sergio Parisse jumps to catch an up and under during a warm up session in Toulouse

Parisse played junior rugby divisions and his first senior division for Club Universitario de La Plata, at La Plata city.

In 2003, Parisse moved to Italy permanently to pursue a rugby career. He signed for Benetton Treviso where he played for four years before being lured to Stade Français by then president Max Guazzini in 2005. He had a long and successful career with the Parisian team, staying there for 14 seasons and winning two Top 14 titles. In 2019, he cut ties with the club after disagreements with the coaching team led by South African Heyneke Meyer. Although it was rumoured that he could go back to finish his career with his first professional club, Treviso, Parisse signed for Top 14 rivals Toulon.

== International career ==
Parisse was eligible to play international rugby for Argentina, the country of his birth, and Italy, the country where his parents are from. At just 17 years old, he played for Italy U20s in the Junior World Championship in Chile. There he was spotted by Argentine selectors and approached in an attempt to persuade him to switch his allegiance to the Pumas set-up. When asked if he had any regrets on staying on with Italy, he answered “I have no regrets at all (...) it never occurred to me not to play for Italy. My parents are Italian, we were brought up speaking Italian and returned home to L’Aquila every summer. To play for Italy was a dream, to play for my culture and my family. When you pull on a jersey, it is not just a piece of clothing for the day, a convenience. Loyalty, honour and trust - these are the things that mean a lot to me"

Parisse made his full Test debut for the Italy national team in June 2002, being capped at the age of 18 by then Azzurri coach John Kirwan, in a 64–10 defeat to New Zealand in Hamilton.

Though Italy failed to make it beyond the pool stage of the 2007 Rugby World Cup, Parisse played well.

Parisse continued his form into the 2008 Six Nations Championship. Parisse won his 50th cap for Italy against England in the 2008 Six Nations Championship at the age of 24. Parisse is also the Italian captain, appointed in 2008 by Nick Mallett in place of Marco Bortolami. In September 2008 Parisse was nominated for IRB International Player of the Year alongside Dan Carter, Ryan Jones, Shane Williams and Mike Blair.

Parisse missed most of the 2009–10 Top 14 season with a serious knee injury that ruled him out of the 2010 Six Nations Championship.

Parisse captained Italy in the 2011 Rugby World Cup in New Zealand. Italy finished third in their group, one place short of qualification, after two losses against Australia and Ireland on top of their two wins against USA and Russia. Parisse scored a total of two tries at the tournament.

He captained Italy in the 2012 Six Nations Championship. Italy had a mixed championship with losses against France, Wales, England and Ireland but also victory against Scotland to avoid the wooden spoon. Parisse again captained Italy for the 2013 Six Nations Championship. The campaign started very well for the Italians when they beat France for only the second time ever, with Parisse himself scoring a try. The following week Italy lost 33–10 to Scotland in an underwhelming performance at Murrayfield. Parisse missed Italy's match with Wales on 23 February 2013 due to abusing a referee in a club game with Stade Français Paris. Italy struggled without their captain and lost 26–9. Parisse returned for Italy's next game against England and despite England being massive favourites Italy put in a competitive display to only lose by seven points, 18–11.

In the last week of the 2013 championship, Italy beat Ireland for the first time ever in the championship by a margin of 22–15 making it one of Italy's most successful Six Nations ever.

== Postponed retirements ==
Parisse had planned to retire from international rugby after the 2019 Rugby World Cup but decided to postpone his retirement due to the cancellation of the fixture against New Zealand because of Typhoon Hagibis. He later announced he would retire after the 2020 Six Nations Championship, where he could play in front of his home crowd at the Stadio Olimpico one more time. Unfortunately, the match against England in March was cancelled due to the COVID-19 pandemic and Parisse again postponed his retirement. In an interview with Will Greenwood in late 2020, Parisse stated that he would keep in touch with Italian national side head coach Franco Smith in order that he might be able to retire after participating in the 2021 Six Nations. Italy started the 2021 championship with Luca Bigi as captain in place of Parisse.

== Personal life ==
He is a keen skier, but has done it less often after French teammate Sylvain Marconnet broke his leg skiing in 2007.

Parisse married Alexandra Rosenfeld, Miss France 2006 and Miss Europe 2006, in early 2010 in Hérault, Rosenfeld's home department. Their daughter, Ava, was born on 23 August 2010 in Béziers. Rosenfeld and Parisse divorced in April 2013.

Parisse married Silvia Bragazzi in 2014.

Parisse has appeared on Dieux du Stade on numerous occasions.

Parisse's family are native Italian speakers, and he was raised bilingual in Italian and Spanish. He also speaks French and English.

== Style of play ==
Parisse is known for having many qualities, among them, powerful running ability, poised offloading and supreme awareness. He is regarded as a powerful ball-carrier, athletic and furiously committed; a useful line-out option, defensively sound, and blessed with handling, pace and footwork. As a team-mate at Stade in Paris, England lock Tom Palmer described him as "a high-quality player, a very good and powerful athlete, who combines that with being very skilful. He has a high work-rate, so he has everything you need to be a top player."

Ireland legend Paul O'Connell has also waxed lyrical about Parisse. "Sergio has everything. He catches high balls, he chases high balls, he chips, he can make turnovers on the ground, he intercepts, he’s a phenomenal carrier, if he has to go straight he has great footwork, he’s a brilliant passer, he pressurises the referee. He does it all."

== Legacy ==
Parisse has often been praised for maintaining his high standards and world-class performances even as a part of a lacklustre era for Italian rugby. About this fact, he stated that "Obviously I did not achieve a lot of wins in the Italy jersey but that doesn't make me feel any less proud. I have always hated defeat but that does not make me feel like a failure. I was not playing for New Zealand, so I knew there would be more defeats than victories, but as captain you have to set an example. My job as captain was not just to make speeches. The day after a game, you might wake up and feel dead because you've given a lot of emotion, but you've failed to win. You lose by three points and you're overthinking. "Why did we lose? How do we get better? Why didn't our plan work?" But you have to keep going. Again. Again. Again. It is easier to captain a team when you are winning 80 per cent of the time, sure, but you stay positive."

He has played in 142 tests, of which he has lost 106.

Parisse played in five Rugby World Cups, making his debut in the 2003 tournament hosted by Australia, and going on to play in France (2007), New Zealand (2011), England (2015) and Japan (2019). He's only the third player to achieve such a feat, along with fellow Italian back-rower Mauro Bergamasco and Samoan midfielder Brian Lima.

With 69 appearances, Parisse is the most-capped player in Guinness Six Nations history.

He's the fourth player with most international caps (142) in world rugby, only behind All Blacks legend Richie McCaw, Wales stalwart Alun Wyn Jones and Australian prop, James Slipper.

Parisse has been twice nominated for the prestigious World Rugby Player of the Year award, losing to Welsh speedster Shane Williams in 2008 and All Blacks icon Kieran Read in 2013. To date, he's the only Italian to be nominated. In 2024, he became the first Italian player inducted into the World Rugby Hall of Fame.

When Italy coach Franco Smith was asked how to replace Parisse, he was straightforward, "You don't. The more you want to replace him, the more difficult it is going to be. He's one of a kind. There are a lot of rugby personalities around the world that have never been replaced. You lose them forever, but there are new personalities that can develop. He's overshadowed Italian rugby, for the right reasons, for a very long time. Now it's time to shine a light on others who can develop with Sergio as their example."

== Honours ==
- National Championship of Excellence
  - Champions Treviso: 2002–03, 2003–04
- Coppa Italia
  - Champions Treviso: 2004–05
- French Top 14
  - Champions Stade Français: 2006–07, 2014–15
- European Challenge Cup
  - Champions Stade Français: 2016–17
  - Champions RC Toulon: 2022–23
  - Runners-up (2) 2010–11, 2012–13
- World Rugby Hall of Fame
  - Inductee 169: 2024
