= Tali'Zorah =

Video game character

- Mass Effect character
- Tali as presented in The Art of the Mass Effect Universe
- First appearance: Mass Effect (2007)
- Voiced by: Ash Sroka

In-universe information
- Race: Quarian
- Class: Machinist
- Skill: Technology

Tali'Zorah, or Tali in short, is a character in BioWare's Mass Effect franchise, who serves as a party member (or "squadmate") in all three games in the Mass Effect trilogy. She is of the quarian alien race. Within the series, she is a skilled technician and the daughter of Rael'Zorah, a member of the quarian judicial review Admiralty Board. Ash "Liz" Sroka voices Tali in each of her appearances. Outside of the trilogy, Tali appears in Mass Effect: Homeworlds, a comic series with individual issues on each of several Mass Effect 3 squadmates.

Tali was initially the only quarian in the series. In the sequels, more extreme variations of her design were discarded in favor of revisions on her previous look. The Mass Effect 3 development team considered her removal from the squad, but ultimately chose to include her due to staff interest. The team also debated whether to reveal her masked face.

Tali has been received positively, and is one of the series' most popular characters. Her true appearance was a common online discussion topic amongst fans, though her face, upon its reveal, was criticized for being based on a stock photo, and was later replaced in a remaster. Various merchandise for the character, as with other of the series' squadmates, has been released.

== Character overview ==
Tali is a quarian, one of a nomadic alien race driven from their homeworld, Rannoch, by a race of software-based intelligences which they created, the geth. Her full name is Tali'Zorah vas Neema nar Rayya; per traditional quarian naming customs, her name means "Tali'Zorah, crew of the Neema, born on the Rayya." We are first introduced to Tali in Mass Effect 1, where she is on her pilgrimage and therefore not yet a crew member of the Neema until Mass Effect 2.

As a quarian, Tali must wear a full-body environmental suit due to her race's weaker immune systems, which also has the effect of hiding her physical appearance and facial features. Tali is first introduced on her Pilgrimage, a quarian rite where young adults leave to obtain a gift for a captain so as to be allowed to join their crew. Having completed this after the first game, her design in Mass Effect 2 and 3 reflects her new maturity. In both Mass Effect 2 and Mass Effect 3, Tali's default appearance can be changed to various alternate outfits; Mass Effect 2 unlocks one outfit by completing her loyalty mission while another requires buying the "Alternate Appearance Pack 2", and Mass Effect 3 offers one alternate from the start and unlocks another by buying the From Ashes DLC.

Tali is a skilled technician and engineer, and renowned in the quarian Migrant Fleet, the spaceship collective home to the race. She has additional pressure to excel as the daughter of Admiral Rael'Zorah, though the Admiralty position is not technically hereditary. Her father was also strict and had high expectations, and tried to set an example for the rest of the fleet; this made him distant and saddened Tali. Thanks to her father, she also received some of the best military training available on the fleet.

== Creation and development ==
Tali as she appears in the first Mass Effect. Her appearance differs from future games, where the design would be refined and is less "mature".

Tali initially served as the only example of a quarian. Initial concept drawings for Tali and the quarians were finished before the geth's, but the final geth design then influenced the quarian look. More extreme designs for her Mass Effect 2 appearance were discarded for a "more polished" version of her original "iconic" look instead. Her final new appearance was chosen as it distinguished the character from other quarians introduced in the second game. Tali's Mass Effect 3 redesign proved difficult due to the team's passionate views about her character, though ME3's art director, Derek Watts, felt that most fans had been supportive of the changes to characters' designs.

During BioWare's naming meetings, prior to the release of the first game, Tali's name had been "Talsi Orah", with Orah as the familiar name. However, this was changed for both its connotations of softness, which did not fit with the direction they wanted to take the character, and its awkward pronunciation. Tali's name changes over the course of the series. Her birth ship was the Rayya, as evidenced by her full name, "Tali'Zorah nar Rayya", in the first game. At the start of Mass Effect 2, she is called "Tali'Zorah vas Neema", showing that, having completed her Pilgrimage, she has become part of the crew of the Neema. During her loyalty mission in 2, her name changes to "Tali'Zorah vas Normandy", as she officially joins Commander Shepard's Normandy SR-2 crew.

New York City actress Ash ("Liz") Sroka voices Tali throughout the Mass Effect trilogy, her first role in a video game. Sroka auditioned for three different roles: the female Commander Shepard, Tali'Zorah, and one other female character. After initially receiving the role of Tali, she was still unsure of how much material there was. Ginny McSwain gave voice direction, and would generally take two takes—the first to use, the second as back-up, and occasionally a third or more if the recording did not fit with what she wanted. Recording sessions would generally last about four hours. Sroka uses an accent described as "unidentifiable pseudo-Eastern European" to voice the character.

Sroka described Tali as being highly loyal and "grounded in her beliefs" but also having a certain "humility" to her. Sroka also underlined her vulnerability, which she felt was one of the character's strengths. She described the possible romance with player-character Commander Shepard as her "sexual awakening", which she also felt helped demonstrate the character's vulnerability. Sroka herself is not a gamer, though she says she enjoys the character of Tali and is happy to have landed the role.

Like Garrus Vakarian, Tali was not an option for player romantic pursuit in the first game as the developers were unsure whether the alien characters would be emotionally compelling. Tali's romance event tree was added in Mass Effect 2 due to fan demand and her ability to express human emotion. This romance, if pursued in the second game, can be continued in Mass Effect 3. The romance event tree in 2 was written by Trick Weekes. Mass Effect 2 lead writer Mac Walters commented that "[t]he choice should be in 'who' you romance, not so much 'how'", with each of the characters having different-natured romances depending on their individual personalities.

Each squad member in Mass Effect 2 had music composed for them, intended to convey their character; BioWare gave the composers detailed character studies for each to help. Tali's theme was created by Jimmy Hinson, who had generally made game remixes beforehand. Hinson worked from his home in Tennessee and made his pieces using FL Studio 9. Although they were given full access to the game's content, Hinson chose to avoid looking beyond what he absolutely needed to look at to write the tracks, due to wanting to experience the game fresh upon its release. In addition to Tali, Hinson also wrote tracks for Samara and Grunt, as well as various other tracks in the game.

The game artists regularly drafted variations on Tali's face throughout the series' development. BioWare's position on whether to reveal her face was a long-standing internal debate, and the developers announced they were still unsure during Mass Effect 3's development. Concept artist Matt Rhodes felt it would interesting to see how players compared her personality to her appearance, and how they would respond to an appearance that challenged their expectations as "a little too alien, just a little too repellant". They were aware that either decision would likely annoy some people, and that no reveal could universally fit all views of Tali. BioWare wished to unveil her face in a "tasteful way" outside of the game engine, and decided that a gift from Tali would be the best way. A stock photo was used to ensure the face's closeness to a real photograph. An in-game photo of Tali's face is available as a gift to the player-character Commander Shepard upon pursuing her Mass Effect 3 romance event tree.

BioWare considered not making Tali a squadmate in Mass Effect 3. Some writers, such as Weekes, felt passionately about her inclusion, which led the team to believe that the players could share their passion. Preston Watamaniuk, lead designer for the Mass Effect series, found Tali's death in 3 was the toughest for him to plan, though he felt it needed to be possible due to the option of wiping out the quarians.

== Appearances ==
=== Mass Effect ===
The first game of the trilogy, 2007's Mass Effect, marks Tali's first appearance. Whilst on her Pilgrimage, Tali discovers that a rogue Spectre (elite agent of the galaxy's central government), Saren, is working with the geth and has attacked Eden Prime, humanity's first space colony. She arranges for a meeting to trade with the Shadow Broker, but is betrayed by its organizer, the thug Fist, who pretends to organize a meeting but instead has sent her into an ambush. Commander Shepard, the player-character, rescues her. Tali gives the evidence to the Commander, and Saren consequently loses his Spectre status. Shepard is then sent to hunt down Saren, and Tali joins the player-character's squad. Tali can join the player-character on missions and is available for personal conversation aboard Shepard's spaceship, the Normandy.

Onboard the Normandy, Tali is initially excited to be there, intrigued by the advanced technology used to power the Normandy, and stays in the engine room as a result. The next time Shepard speaks to her, though, Tali now seems saddened and withdrawn. She tells Shepard that she's losing sleep since the Normandy's engines run so quietly compared to ships in her home flotilla, where quiet ships indicate a bad engine or a malfunctioning air filter, plus the ship, due to how it's spread out, seems emptier. This results in Tali feeling slightly homesick and she ponders if the true purpose of the Pilgrimage is to remind her people of what they still have. The next time Shepard speaks to her, Tali's spirits are back up, having adjusted to living on the Normandy, plus how the crew has been treating her like one of their own, especially Shepard. She thanks Shepard for this, saying that quarians are treated as second-class citizens by other races and Shepard is the first to treat her as an equal. If the player completes a particular side-mission involving the geth and then speak to Tali afterward, she will ask if she can have a copy of the geth data that Shepard recovered, explaining that it is exactly what she needs to complete her Pilgrimage. If the player allows her to have a copy, Tali is overly happy, promising to pay back Shepard by helping them defeat Saren. If the player declines, Tali will still promise to stay to fight Saren, but will then leave afterward so she can finish her Pilgrimage.

=== Mass Effect 2 ===
Tali returns in the 2010 sequel, during the game's second mission on the human colony world Freedom's Progress, leading a group of quarians in search of a quarian named Veetor, who is on his own Pilgrimage. The colony has been attacked by the "Collectors," its human colonists abducted, and Tali agrees to work with Shepard in order to help search for Veetor, over the objections of her team. The quarian team rush to Veetor's location only to be defeated by mechanical guards that have been reprogrammed to shoot on sight by the fearful Veetor; Shepard's squad arrives too late to save all of the quarians, but they manage to eliminate the guards and calm Veetor. After learning what Veetor witnessed during the attack, Shepard can either send Veetor back to the Migrant Fleet with Tali to be treated for his trauma, or to hand the quarian over to Cerberus, Shepard's employers, for further questioning about the Collectors.

Tali later appears on the planet Haestrom, a former quarian colony, where Shepard is sent to recruit her. She and a team of quarian soldiers were sent to investigate a star aging faster than usual and are under attack by a geth patrol that spotted their activity. After Shepard eliminates the attacking geth and meets her in the bunker in which she had been trapped with her equipment, Tali departs with Shepard on the mission to investigate and stop the Collectors, receiving permission from the Admiralty Board after the fact.

Tali's "loyalty mission," an optional mission that reveals more of a squad member's past which is meant to increase loyalty, puts her on trial before the Admiralty Board, facing possible exile for bringing active geth parts to the Flotilla, a charge she denies. Tali admits to Shepard that she did send her father inert geth components to develop more effective weapons, but asserts that they could not spontaneously activate. When the Normandy crew arrives on the vessel hosting the trial, Tali is referred to as "Tali'Zorah vas Normandy," an unexpected revelation that she has been formally reassigned without any notice; this development means that Shepard, as Tali's captain, will represent her in trial. The admirals reveal during the trial that geth have taken over a ship, the Alarei, and that Tali's father was on the ship when the geth took over and he is presumed dead. Given the evidence supporting the grave accusations, Tali has the option to board the Alarei to search for evidence of her innocence and to clear the geth infestation; on board the Alarei, Tali and Shepard discover her Rael'Zorah's remains and logs documenting his experiments on the geth, reactivating and assembling the components Tali sent him, and that he is to blame for the attack. Tali asks Shepard not to reveal the information they discover, as it would disgrace his otherwise good name. At the trial, the player chooses whether Shepard withholds the new evidence (Tali is exiled with Rael'Zorah's good name intact) or submits it (Tali is innocent at the cost of her father's reputation). If the player completes certain actions prior to undertaking the mission (saves Kal'reegar, sends Veetor back to the fleet, talking to both of them and finally talking to all the Admirals) they may choose to incite the crowd to show popular support for Tali and her previous service record (Tali is found innocent without disgracing her father). Finally, if the player has enough Morality points (Paragon/Renegade points) they may charm or intimidate the admirals to find Tali innocent without disgracing her father.

Tali can die during the final mission of the game—the "Suicide Mission"—depending on the player's choices. Her chances of dying increase if the player submits the evidence against her will, or does not complete her loyalty mission.

=== Mass Effect 3 ===
Unless the player imports a Mass Effect 2 saved game where Tali cannot appear in Mass Effect 3, Tali shows when the Commander moves to recruit the quarian fleet in the fight against The Reapers, powerful sapient synthetic-organic starships with intentions to harvest all organic life in the galaxy. Tali joins the squad, and her conversation options tell of the quarians' new attack on the now Reaper-allied geth, in a bid by the quarians to try and reclaim their homeworld. Depending on the player's choices in the second game, Tali may either be an Admiral or merely an advisor on how to defeat the geth. Eventually, the player must choose between saving the geth or the quarians, or, if certain conditions are fulfilled, negotiating a stand-down and saving both parties. If the player sides with the geth and lets the quarians die, Tali commits suicide by jumping off a cliff; otherwise, she fully joins the squad and can be found interacting with other Normandy crew members. Both Admiral Daro'Xen vas Moreh and Admiral Shala'Raan vas Tonbay fulfill Tali's narrative role in saved games where Tali is deceased by the events of Mass Effect 3, and neither character join Shepard's squad.

The downloadable add-on Mass Effect 3: Citadel adds a number of character moments for Tali, including (depending on dialogue and event choices or whether Shepard is in a romance with her) revealing her love of romantic movies, her talent for singing and doing impressions of the Normandy, and the fact she cannot hold her liquor very well.

=== Mass Effect: Homeworlds ===
The second issue of the comic Homeworlds was revealed to focus around Tali's past. Released on May 30, 2012, the issue tells of the beginning of her Pilgrimage, and the events leading up to her appearance in the first game. Originally intending to take the quarian ship Honorata to the planet Illium, along with Keenah'Breizh, in search of valuable items, they discover geth activity on an unidentified ice planet. Tali extracts the memory core from one of the geth, and discovers a recording of a conversation between Saren and Matriarch Benezia discussing the attack on Eden Prime.

Once they arrive at Illium, the crew is attacked by a group of mercenaries including Commander Jacobus, hired by Saren, leaving Tali and Keenah the only survivors. The two stowaway on a ship to the Citadel, though are uncovered and turned over to C-Sec once they arrive. Though they try to tell of the evidence they have found, they are ignored and told to leave the Citadel. Later, they are suddenly attacked by Jacobus, injuring Tali and mortally wounding Keenah. After being chased through the Citadel, Tali eventually traps Jacobus in an incinerator, killing him, though Keenah collapses and dies.

Tali then arrives at Dr. Michel's clinic, who treats her wounds. She is told to go to the bar Chora's Den by Barla Von, and put into contact with the Shadow Broker, setting the stage for her entry into the first Mass Effect game.

== Reception ==
Tali has received a positive critical response. Writing for UGO, Evan Saathoff listed Tali as his fourth best video game companion, comparing her as the "innocent, girl next door experience" to the sexiness of Halo's Cortana. GamesRadar+'s Carolyn Gudmundson listed Tali as one of several video game characters she'd "go gay for", noting her "kind personality and air of mystery", as well as her technical genius and accent. Upon hearing news for a potential Mass Effect film, Dan Ryckert of Game Informer looked at the different characters and felt Famke Janssen would be best suited to play the role of Tali—due to having a similar body to the character and having played Xenia Onatopp, a Russian-accented soldier, in the 1995 Bond film GoldenEye.

Within the trilogy, Tali is one of the most popular characters, with various sources describing her as a fan favorite. Steven Hopper, writing for IGN, listed her as his second favorite Mass Effect teammate after Garrus Vakarian, praising her "endearing geekiness" and the story that follows her. Similarly, UGO's Sal Basile listed her as the fourth best squadmate in Mass Effect 3, giving credit to her in-game abilities. Kate Gray from Kotaku was shocked and horrified by Tali's sudden death as an unforeseen consequence of her decision making during her initial Mass Effect 3 playthrough, which made her realize that for her, Tali had changed over the course of the trilogy "from a voiced collection of tech skills into a person whose input and companionship I valued... not, at least, until it was too late". Kirk Hamilton, of Kotaku, also felt her one-on-one dialogue scene in the Citadel DLC was the best out of all the squadmates'. A reader's poll published by IGN in December 2014 for their top ultimate RPG party choices placed Tali at #20 under the reserves section. Another reader's poll published by PC Gamer in 2015 reveal that Tali was the third most popular love interest for Shepard, and was overall the second most popular Mass Effect character. A poll of series fans held for the 2016 edition of Guinness World Records: Gamer's Edition showed that Tali was the second most popular romantic choice among respondents. In a 2016 article, PC Gamer ranked Tali the sixth best companion of the Mass Effect series. PC Gamer staff praised the character's story arc which spans across the entire trilogy, and "her personal conflict with Legion is a genuinely tense balancing act, and Tali's loyalty mission deepens your understanding of the geth/quarian conflict and the quarian customs".

The first person named after a Mass Effect character, Tali'Zorah, was born on 7 January 2014. Her parents are fans of the Mass Effect series. Nevertheless, PC Gamer's Andy Kelly listed the character as one BioWare character he hated, expressing confusion at her popularity and calling her "One of the dullest characters in BioWare history."

=== Tali's face ===
Tali's face as depicted in a photo in Mass Effect 3. The image was criticized for its stock photo origins.

Tali's unmasked face and its potential appearance have been subject to discussion by both critics and fans. Video game developer for BioWare Casey Hudson, in an interview, acknowledged depictions of Tali's face as the most common fan art. Jordan Boughman, writing for GamesRadar+, highlighted a piece of fan art that he enjoyed and which a BioWare developer had retweeted. Before Tali's face was revealed, IGN's Scott Nichols concluded that fans did not just want to see her face, but also "the expressions it can make, adding yet another level of emotional depth and complexity to a fan favorite character". PC Gamer's Tom Francis also included the face in his list of 15 things he wanted to see in Mass Effect 3.

Early concept art depicted Tali as being hairless, with pale skin and cat-like eyes, described as "a little too alien" and potentially repellent to players, challenging their expectations. GamesRadar+ writers Mikel Reparaz and Tyler Nagata echoed this sentiment, feeling that her face should look unusual or unsettling, citing the game's other races. However, this idea was ultimately dropped in favor of an attractive, human-like appearance. The use of a Photoshopped stock photo (of Miss England model Hammasa Kohistani) met with wide criticism from fans, who believed it to be rushed. Kotaku's Luke Plunkett, describing it as a "crushing disappointment", highlighted an artwork by deviantArt artist "K4ll0" that depicted a more alien face. Some critics debated the significance of her appearance, with GameZone's Matt Liebl saying that "no matter what [the developers] did, it would be met with criticism". Fans also expressed disappointment that her face was revealed in a picture, while the romantic scene between her and Shepard was cut far shorter than other characters, and attempted to make replacement scenes to "fix" the omission.

Later acknowledging the backlash, the 2021 Mass Effect Legendary Edition compilation removed the modified stock photo of Kohistani and replacing it with a unique computer-generated humanoid face with all-white eyes, while retaining her human-like appearance. Overall, fan reception towards the change has been positive, although it was also met with disappointment from some quarters that the developers opted to maintain her human-like appearance rather than making her appear more alien.

=== Promotion and merchandise ===
Like other characters in the trilogy, Tali has been subject to various merchandise. DC Direct included Tali their first line of Mass Effect 2 squadmate figures, first revealed in January 2010 and then released in April 2011. A second figure was announced during Comic-Con 2012, as part of Square Enix's second line of Play Arts Kai Mass Effect figures (along with the female Shepard). BioWare also officially endorsed an originally fan-made plushie of the character, selling it on their online store. Dark Horse's Mass Effect playing cards feature Tali as the Queen of Hearts, alongside other Mass Effect 2 characters in other roles.
