= Foot model =

Kind of fashion model

A foot model is a person who models footwear, which can include accessories such as shoes, socks, jewellery and other related items. It is mostly used for advertisements.

== Description ==
A foot model is a person who models footwear, which can include accessories such as shoes, socks, jewellery and other related items. Foot modeling is mostly used in the advertisement of shoes, foot jewellery, socks, toenail polish, fungus treatments, foot supports, etc.

== Models ==
Famous foot models include Zara Miller, Ashleigh Morris, Claire Kesby-Smith, Beverley Brown, Hannah Howells, Scott Adams, and Elisha Cuthbert. Zara Miller, Beverley Brown, and Hammasa Kohistani are well known foot models in the U.K. Scott Adams was the most sought after foot model in the U.S. from the mid-1970s until he retired in 1995. He was the top model for Dr. Scholl's during that period.
