= Alexandra Rosenfeld =

French model

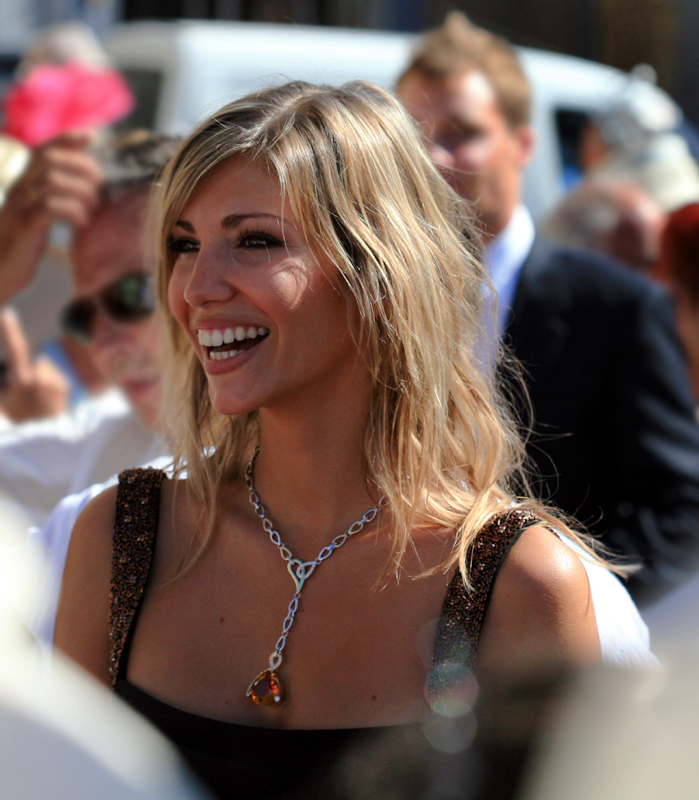
- Alexandra Rosenfeld in July 2007
- Born: 23 November 1986 (age 39); Béziers, Hérault, France
- Height: 1.73 m (5 ft 8 in)
- Spouse: Sergio Parisse (2010–13) (divorced)
- Partner: Jean Imbert (2013–2014)
- Children: 2
- Beauty pageant titleholder
- Title: Miss Europe 2006; Miss France 2006; Miss Languedoc 2005; Miss Pays d'Hérault 2005
- Hair color: Blond
- Eye color: Brown

Alexandra Rosenfeld (born 23 November 1986) is a French beauty pageant titleholder who was elected Miss France 2006. Representing the region of Languedoc, she succeeded Cindy Fabre as the 77th Miss France on 3 December 2005. She was crowned Miss Europe 2006.

== Early life and education ==
Alexandra Rosenfeld was born in Béziers in the department of Hérault. She is Jewish. She has blonde hair and brown eyes and is 5 ft 8 in (1.73 m) tall.

Rosenfeld studied tourism in Pézenas. She has practised athletics since the age of 10 at the athletics club of Pézenas.

== Beauty pageants ==
=== Miss France ===
Rosenfeld was elected Miss Pays d'Hérault in 2005 and was elected later that year Miss Languedoc-Roussillon. She was then elected Miss France 2006 on 3 December 2005 at Cannes at a television show broadcast on the channel TF1 and hosted by Jean-Pierre Foucault. She succeeded Cindy Fabre and became the 77th Miss France.

=== Miss Europe ===
She was elected Miss Europe 2006 on 27 October in Kyiv, Ukraine. She was the last Miss Europe until the contest was revived in 2016.

She represented France at the election of Miss Universe on 23 July 2006.

== Television ==
Rosenfeld was a member of the jury at the election of Miss France 2013 and has appeared in the adventure show Fort Boyard on France 2 and as the mystery passenger in an episode of the ninth season of the French version of Peking Express on channel M6. She was a member of the jury on 11 March 2013 in an episode of the French version of Top Chef on M6.

== Personal life ==
In February 2006, Rosenfeld, who is Jewish, took part in a demonstration against anti-Semitism, which took place after the brutal murder of a young Jew in Paris.

Rosenfeld married Italian rugby player Sergio Parisse on 5 July 2010 at Saint-Thibéry. The couple had a daughter, Ava. The godmother is Valérie Bègue. Rosenfeld and Parisse divorced in April 2013. In May 2018 she met the journalist Hugo Clément and fell in love immediately. They moved together to Paris. On 7 July 2019 she announced that she was pregnant with her second child, a daughter named Jim.

Awards and achievements
Preceded by (Germany) Shermine Shahrivar	Miss Europe; 2006	Succeeded by Pageant cancelled
Preceded by (Normandy) Cindy Fabre	Miss France; 2006	Succeeded by (Picardy) Rachel Legrain-Trapani
Preceded by Charlotte Ledet	Miss Languedoc; 2005	Succeeded by Stephanie Pomarès
