= Eleanor Glynn =

English model and beauty queen

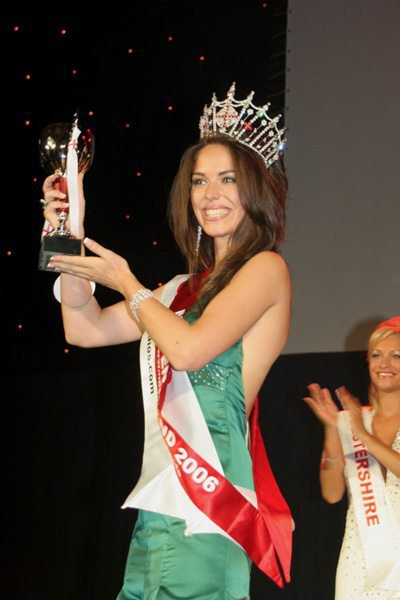
- Glynn at Miss England 2006
- Born: Eleanor Mary Anne Glynn; 28 March 1986 (age 40); Sandford-on-Thames, Oxford, England
- Occupations: Model; beauty pageant titleholder
- Beauty pageant titleholder
- Title: Miss England 2006
- Major competitions: Miss England 2006 (Winner); Miss World 2006 (Unplaced); Miss Europe 2006 (Unplaced)

Eleanor Mary Anne Glynn (born 28 March 1986) is an English model and beauty pageant titleholder. She won the Miss SIXTV Oxfordshire title in 2003, the Miss Oxfordshire title in 2006, and the Miss England 2006 title on the 14 July 2006, she later went on to represent England in the Miss World 2006 contest in Poland and then Miss Great Britain in the Miss Europe 2006 contest in Ukraine.

== Biography ==
Glynn started learning piano in Oxfordshire and attended The Virtuoso songwriting contest held in Reading in 2004. Glynn was part of the Miss World 2006 talent show; performing "Since U Been Gone", hosted in Wrocław. This was followed by a performance at City of Music.

Glynn has taken part in the filming of two music videos, the first was for Chico's "Curvy Cola Bottle Body Baby" (which was filmed at Pinewood); the second was for Zak Knight's "All Over Again" (produced and directed by company Pixelloft).

Glynn recorded a 2007 Rugby World Cup song with a group called 'The Miss England Girls', entitled "Come on England (Time for Glory)"; this was recorded and released with ShaileRyde.

== Beauty pageant career ==
Glynn won Miss SIXTV Oxfordshire in 2003, and participated in Miss England 2004, which was held in London. She also won Miss Oxfordshire in 2005 and participated in Miss England 2006, which was held in Leicester, winning the competition. She then participated in Miss World 2006, which was held in Poland, and represented Great Britain in the Miss Europe 2006 competition in Ukraine. She was a member of the judging panel of Miss England 2008.

=== Modelling ===
During her year as Miss England, Glynn made local and national headlines having campaigned to ban size zero models from London Fashion Week, and had a spread and photoshoot in Hello.

Honorary titles
Preceded by Hammasa Kohistani	Miss England; 2006	Succeeded by Georgia Horsley
