= Salhia Brakhlia =

French journalist

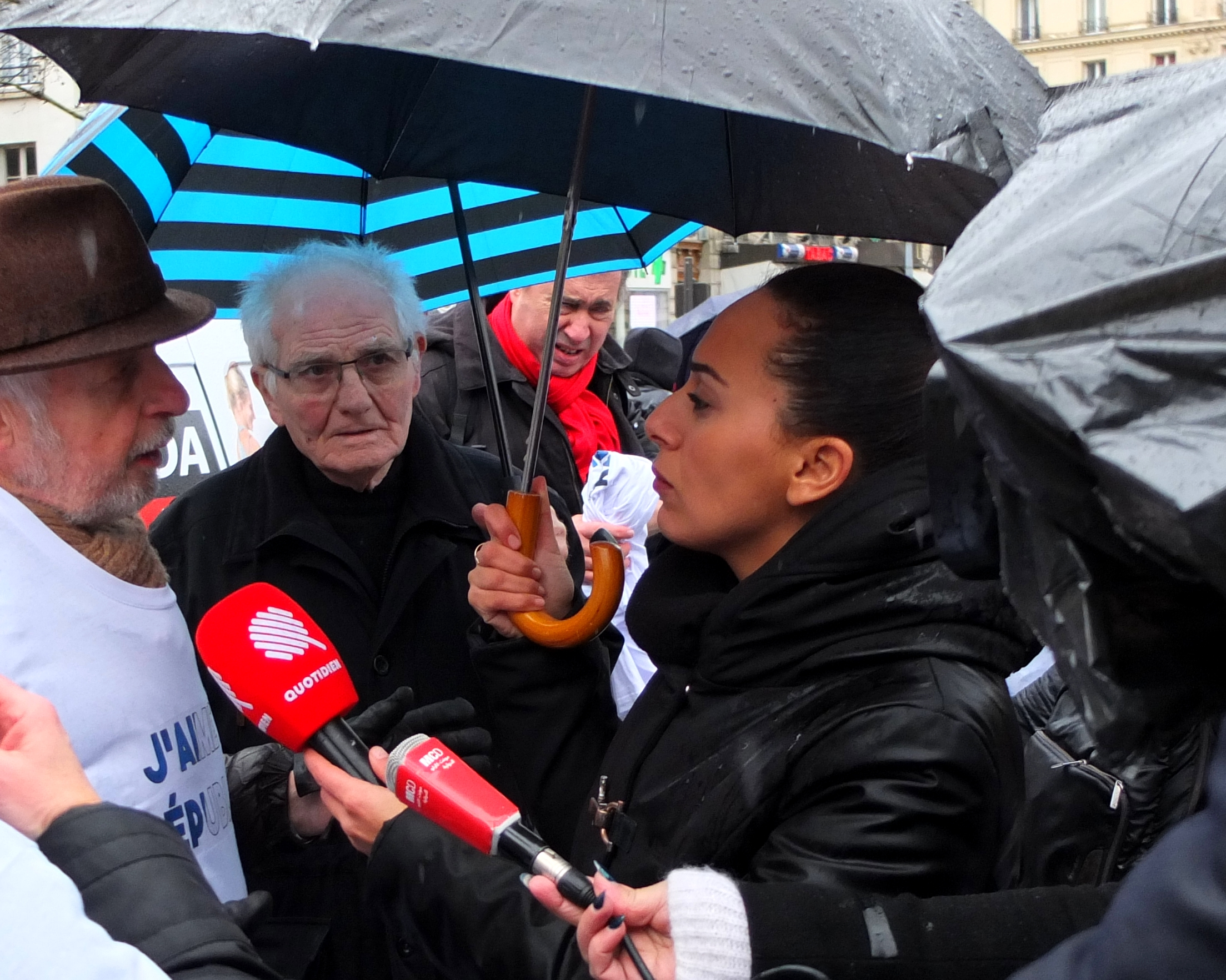
- Salhia Brakhlia in 2019.
- Born: 13 May 1986 (age 40); Condé-sur-l'Escaut, Nord, France
- Education: University of Paris 1 Panthéon-Sorbonne
- Occupation: Journalist
- Employer: France Info

Salhia Brakhlia (born 13 May 1986; Condé-sur-l'Escaut) is a French political journalist. She has contributed to television programs on Canal +, BFM TV, TMC (for the Quotidien program) and France Info since 2020.

== Biography ==
Her parents, originally from Algeria, work in a transport company they founded. She followed higher education at the Sorbonne (DEUG in history and political science) then joined the school of journalism in Nice. In September 2007, she started an internship at the Grand Journal de Canal, where she compiled the biographical files of the guests. She then joined Le Petit Journal in August 2008. She left Canal and joined BFM TV, where she continued political reporting for the program L'œil de Salhia Brakhlia.

In June 2018, she left BFMTV and joined TMC in season 3 of the show Quotidien. In August 2020, she joined the France Info radio station as a political journalist. In June 2021, the daily Le Parisien announced that Brakhlia was leaving Quotidien and would devote herself to the morning show of France Info as well as special evenings on public service, in the approach to the French presidential election of 2022.
