= Miss Europe 2006 =

International beauty pageant

- Date: 27 October 2006
- Presenters: Jean-Pierre Foucault & Victoria Lopyreva
- Venue: Kyiv, Ukraine
- Broadcaster: TMC
- Entrants: 33
- Placements: 12
- Debuts: Montenegro, Serbia
- Withdrawals: Croatia, Gibraltar, Israel, Ireland, Latvia, Portugal, Russia, Serbia & Montenegro
- Returns: Albania, Austria, Georgia & Great Britain
- Winner: Alexandra Rosenfeld; France

Miss Europe 2006, was the 58th edition of the Miss Europe pageant and the third and final edition under Endemol France. After this years contest, the pageant was planned for 2007, 2008 & 2009 with it being held in places in Moscow and Beirut. The contest, however, was not held after 2006 and Endemol France stopped the pageant after this edition. The Miss Europe pageant went unheld until 2016 when the newly formed Miss Europe Organization started the pageant back up. This year's pageant was held in Kyiv, Ukraine on 27 October 2006. Alexandra Rosenfeld of France was crowned Miss Europe 2006 by outgoing titleholder Shermine Shahrivar of Germany.

== Results ==
=== Placements ===
Placement	Contestant
Miss Europe 2006	France – Alexandra Rosenfeld
1st Runner-Up	Ukraine – Alena Avramenko
2nd Runner-Up	Spain – Laura Ojeda Ramirez
3rd Runner-Up	Poland – Katarzyna Borowicz
4th Runner-Up	Belarus – Yuliya Sindzeyeva
Top 12	Armenia – Marina Vardanyan; Belgium – Kaat Vermeeren; Finland – Sini Vahela; Germany – Daniela Domröse; Moldova – Yekaterina Vigovskaya; Norway – Karoline Nakken; Switzerland – Sabine Christina Heierli

=== Order of announcements ===
Top 12

- 1. Finland
- 2. Moldova
- 3. Norway
- 4. Armenia
- 5. Switzerland
- 6. Belgium
- 7. France
- 8. Spain
- 9. Belarus
- 10. Poland
- 11. Ukraine
- 12. Germany

Top 5

- 1. France
- 2. Poland
- 3. Ukraine
- 4. Spain
- 5. Belarus

== Judges ==
- Roberto Cavalli
- Charles-Philippe d'Orléans
- Adriana Karembeu
- Anthony Delon
- Alexandre Zouari
- Caroline Gruosi-Scheufele

== Contestants ==
- Albania – Suada Bilbil Sherifi
- Armenia – Marina Vardanyan
- Austria – Cathrin Czizek
- Belarus – Yuliya Sindzeyeva
- Belgium – Kaat Vermeeren
- Bosnia & Herzegovina – Valentina Jurkovic
- Bulgaria – Ralitsa Bratovanova
- Cyprus – Konstantina Kristodoulou
- Czech Republic – Daniela Frantzová
- Denmark – Sandra Vester
- Estonia – Jana Kuvaitseva
- Finland – Sini Vahela
- France – Alexandra Rosenfeld
- Georgia – Tatia Aprasidze
- Germany – Daniela Domröse
- Great Britain – Eleanor Mary Ann Glynn
- Greece – Olympia Hopsonidou
- Hungary – Tunde Semmi-Kis
- Iceland – Asdís Svava Hallgrímsdóttir
- Malta – Sefora Micallef
- Moldova – Yekaterina Vigovskaya
- Montenegro – Maja Perovic
- Netherlands – Florencia Mulder
- Norway – Karoline Nakken
- Poland – Katarzyna Weronika Borowicz
- Romania – Irina Cucireve
- Serbia – Ana Sain
- Slovak Republic – Katarina Holanova
- Spain – Laura Ojeda Ramírez
- Sweden – Cecilia Zatterl Harbo Kristensen
- Switzerland – Sabine Christina Heierli
- Turkey – Selda Ögrük
- Ukraine – Alena Avramenko
