= Hammasa Kohistani =

British model of Afghan descent (born 1987)

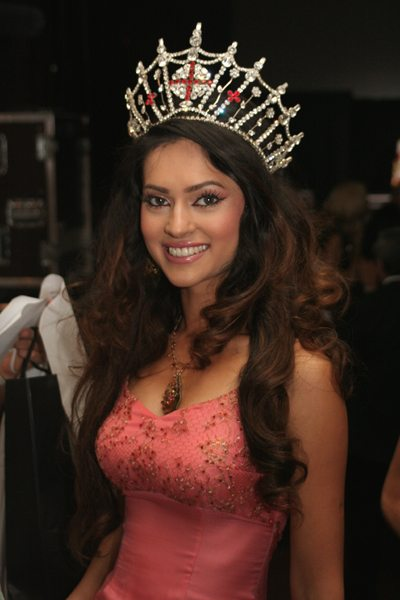
- Kohistani during Miss England 2006
- Born: Hammasa Kohistani; 19 December 1987 (age 38); Tashkent, Uzbek SSR, Soviet Union
- Other name: Miss Maya
- Education: University for the Creative Arts
- Beauty pageant titleholder
- Title: Miss England 2005
- Hair color: Brown
- Eye color: Hazel
- Major competitions: Miss England 2005; Miss World 2005
- Website: https://www.hammasa.com

Hammasa Kohistani (Dari: حماسه کوهستانی, born 19 December 1987) is a British model, charity worker and beauty pageant titleholder. She is of Afghan descent best known for winning the Miss England contest in 2005. She was notably the first Muslim to be crowned as Miss England.

== Early life ==
Kohistani was born in 1987 in Tashkent when it was part of the USSR to Afghan parents of Tajik ethnicity. Her parents had moved there as refugees during the Soviet–Afghan War. She and her parents returned to Kabul, Afghanistan, but in 1996 they escaped from there when the Taliban took control of the city. They eventually made it to Southall, west London, where her father Kushal set up a fast food restaurant.

Kohistani studied in London and attended Lampton School in Hounslow and was a student at Uxbridge College. She then studied brand advertising at the University for the Creative Arts from 2007.

== Modelling career ==
Kohistani started as a teenage model and has mostly been a foot model for various shoe-brands such as Sophia Webster and Kurt Geirger.

At the age of 18, following a two-day competition at Liverpool's Olympia Theatre on 3 September 2005, Kohistani was chosen from 40 contestants to win the Miss England 2005 competition, as a brunette, dressed in an ivory white chiffon and silk ball gown. She later said "When they announced that I had won I thought I had misheard. I hoped they hadn't, but it took a second to sink in." She also said that she was "happy to make history," that "I'm making history and I'm very happy. Hopefully I won't be the last" and that she was looking forward to representing England in the Miss World championships.

She was known as "Miss Maya" after the Asian fashion house which sponsored her, and was reportedly offered a part in a forthcoming Bollywood movie.

Kohistani represented England in the Miss World championships in China in December 2005, but despite being one of the favorites, she failed to advance to the semifinal of 16.

Kohistani was featured in Teen Vogue magazine in May 2006.

== Other ventures ==
Soon after winning Miss England, Kohistani started charitable work for children in Afghanistan. She created and chairs the Roshan Foundation charity.

One of Kohistani's portraits on stock photo site Getty Images was used as the basis for the face of the extraterrestrial character Tali'Zorah from the Mass Effect series of video games. The stock photo was later replaced in Mass Effect Legendary Edition with an original image of Tali shown with her face mask removed.

== Personal life and views ==
Kohistani speaks six languages, including English, Russian, and Persian. As of 2021, she also works as a mental health advocate for refugee women.

After Prime Minister Tony Blair spoke to members of parliament on the anniversary of the 7 July 2005 London bombings, saying that Muslims needed to curb extremism, Kohistani criticized the government's "negative stereotypes" as stirring up animosity against Muslims.

After the Taliban takeover at the end of the war in Afghanistan, Kohistani said that she felt “helpless and frustrated and guilty”.

Honorary titles
Preceded by Danielle Lloyd	Miss England; 2005	Succeeded by Eleanor Glynn
