= Camille Étienne =

French environmental activist

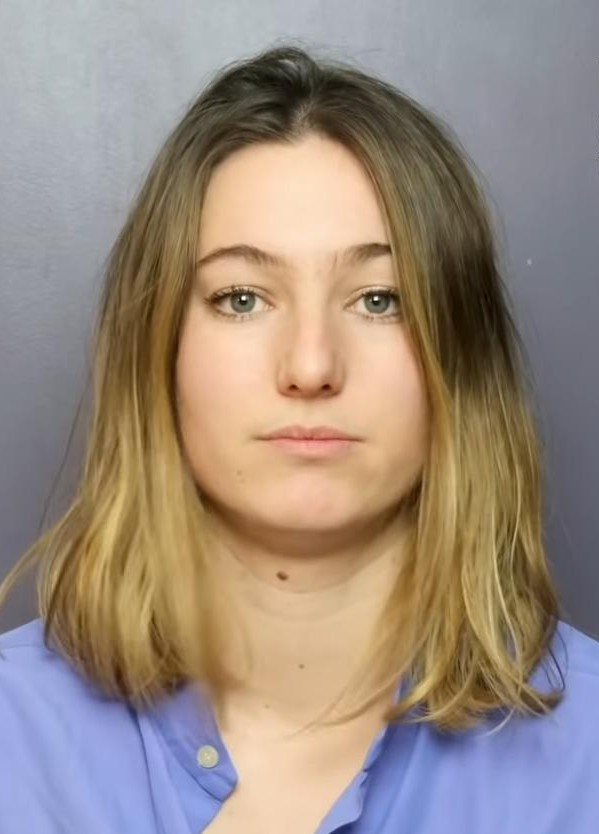
Camille Étienne in 2021

Camille Étienne, born 29 May 1998 in Grenoble, Auvergne-Rhone-Alpes, is a French environmental activist.

A member of the duo Avant l'orage (Before the Storm), along with director Solal Moisan, she takes part in and leads acts of civil disobedience, lobbying of political and economic decision makers and raising public awareness.

== Biography ==
=== Family and education ===
Camille Étienne is originally from Savoie. She grew up in the village of Peisey-Nancroix. Her father is a mountain guide. Her mother was part of the French snowboard and climbing team before an accident ended her career.

As a young girl, Camille wanted to become a judge in family law. She obtained a master's degree in Economics at Sciences Po, Paris, before spending her gap year devoted to activism.

=== Political activism ===
In 2018, she became spokesperson of the On est prêt collective. She spoke at the European Parliament, notably alongside Greta Thunberg, Belgians Adélaïde Charlier and Anuna De Wever and the German Luisa Neubauer.

It was at Sciences Po Paris that Camille turned her attention to the climate crisis. She became president of the student branch of Amnesty International. She was also elected, in 2018, to the student organisation NOVA.

During lockdown, she created the collective 'Avant l'orage' (Before the Storm) which aims to bring together art and environmentalism. On 28 May 2020 the collective's YouTube channel released a video titled Wake Up. The video, filmed in the mountains, features the activist with a dancer and engineering graduate, Léa Durand. Camille speaks about the climate emergency and reminds viewers, particularly those from Generation Z, on the need to act. Her words are accompanied by movements from the dancer. The video was a success, gaining 15 million views on various platforms and has been translated into Spanish, English, German and Portuguese.

In August 2020, while speaking at the Medef summer school, she suggested "working less, but maybe with more meaning" to "reinvent" the world of business. She also questions the economic growth model, which, according to her, pushes us to "produce too much", "exceed planetary limits" and so "directly endangers our lives".

On 10 February 2021, Camille took part in a demonstration near the Élysée with politicians and activists including Matthieu Orphelin, Cécile Duflot, Marie Toussaint and Cyril Dion. See denounced the "lack of courage" from President Emmanuel Macron, who, according to her, "unraveled" the proposals of the Citizens Convention for Climate when drafting the 2021 loi Climat (Climate Law).

On 16 June 2021, she announced that, alongside activist Cyril Dion and MEP Pierre Larrouturou, she was filing a complaint against Jean Castex and four other ministers (Bruno Le Maire, Barbara Pompili, Emmanuelle Wargon and Jean-Baptiste Djebbari) for their inaction in the face of climate change. The French State having already been condemned on numerous occasions (most notably by the Affaire du siècle campaign), they argued that taking individual ministers to court would be a more effective action.

Camille is also engaged in campaigns against greenhouse gas emissions, in particular the EACOP, the world's largest heated oil pipeline planned in East Africa by TotalEnergies and the Lützerath mining site in Germany, as well as the exploitation of the seabed.

In May 2023, she published Pour un soulèvement écologique : dépasser notre impuissance collective (For an Ecological Uprising: Overcoming our Collective Helplessness).

In October 2023, she joined the fight against the planned A69 motorway linking Castres (Tarn) to Toulouse.

== Fame ==
Vanity Fair name her one of the "50 French Women who made 2020", alongside Adèle Haenel and Virginie Despentes.

Technikart named her as one of the "100 who can save 2021".

Website Brut named her on a panel of "31 who made 2022 happen".

Étienne gained wider media attention in early 2023, when she allegedly had an affair with dancer and choreographer Benjamin Millepied, who was married to actress Natalie Portman at the time. On March 8, 2024, it was announced that Portman and Millepied had divorced.

== Films ==
- 2020 : Réveillons-nous, co-directed with Solal Moisan
- 2021 : Génération, co-directed with Solal Moisan
- 2022 : Glacier, co-directed with Solal Moisan
- 2022 : Désobéir, co-directed with Solal Moisan
- 2023 : Pourquoi on se bat, co-directed with Solal Moisan
- 2024 : PFAS : comment les industriels nous empoisonnent with Solal Moisan
