= Quotidien =

French television show

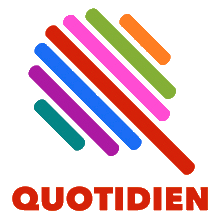
- Created by: Yann Barthès; Laurent Bon
- Developed by: Yann Barthès; Théodore Bourdeau; Guillaume Hennette
- Directed by: Tristan Carné Nicolas Druet Didier Froehly Pascal Rétif Eric Simon
- Presented by: Yann Barthès
- Country of origin: France
- Original language: French
- No. of seasons: 3
- No. of episodes: 171 (season 1); 185 (season 2)

Production
- Producers: Yann Barthès; Laurent Bon
- Production locations: Studios Rive Gauche - AMP Visual TV (set 3), Paris
- Running time: 85 minutes
- Production company: Bangumi

Original release
- Network: TMC
- Release: 12 September 2016 – present

Quotidien (French pronunciation: [kɔtidjɛ̃], lit. 'Daily') is a French television show, first broadcast 12 September 2016 on the channel TMC. It is presented by Yann Barthès.

== History ==
On 9 May 2016, Yann Barthès announced that he was leaving Canal+'s Le Petit Journal, a programme which he had presented since it began in 2004. On the same day the TF1 Group announced that it had recruited Barthès to present two new programmes: a daily show on its channel TMC and a weekly show on the TF1 channel. Canal+ later announced that Barthès would be replaced as presenter of Le Petit Journal by Cyrille Eldin.

The first episode of Quotidien, broadcast 12 September 2016, featured a guest appearance by the singer Vanessa Paradis who opened the series. It also featured an interview with the Socialist Party politician and former Minister of Justice Christiane Taubira, an appearance by the actor Valérie Lemercier, and a live performance by the band La Femme. The show was watched by 1.3 million viewers, representing 6.3% of the total audience.

In 2026, the show gained notable viral attention on the English-speaking Internet particularly Americans as "the French show with the good lighting" in reception of interviews with Hollywood stars such as Margot Robbie and Timothée Chalamet on the show that were observed as better lit and staged as opposed to interviews on American late night talk shows.

== Controversies ==
Catherine Deneuve, on 16 March 2017, defended director Roman Polanski, accused of raping a 13-year-old minor whom he allegedly drugged, arguing that the victim "did not look her age".

In 2020, Yann Barthès was accused of not reacting to the racist words of the former French president Nicolas Sarkozy.

In March 2021, Quotidien was criticised for complacency during an interview of the journalist Patrick Poivre d'Arvor, accused of sexual harassment and rape.

== Starring ==
Name	Role	Season 1	Season 2	Season 3	Season 4	Season 5	Season 6	Season 7
Journalists
Azzeddine Ahmed-Chaouch								
Hugo Clément								
Camille Crosnier								
Lilia Hassaine								
Paul Larrouturou								
Valentine Oberti								
Martin Weill								
Salhia Brakhlia								
Antoine Bristielle								
Sophie Dupont								
Paul Gasnier								
Laura Geisswiller								
Baptiste des Monstiers								
Abda Sall								
Valentine Watrin								
Commentators
Marc Beaugé	Fashion							
Julien Bellver	Media							
Étienne Carbonnier	Sport & TV							
Willy Papa	People							
Juan Arbelaez	Cooking							
Ambre Chalumeau	Culture							
Nicolas Fresco	L'influencé							
Arthur Genre	Le Dézoom							
Clémence Majani	La Mondaine							
Maïa Mazaurette	Sex							
Humorists
Vincent Dedienne								
Éric et Quentin								
Nora Hamzawi								
Jonathan Lambert								
Camille Lellouche								
Le Palmashow								
Panayotis Pascot								
Thomas Wiesel								
Alison Wheeler								
Anne Depétrini								
Laura Felpin								
Pablo Mira								
