= Hugo Clément =

French journalist and documentary filmmaker (born 1989)

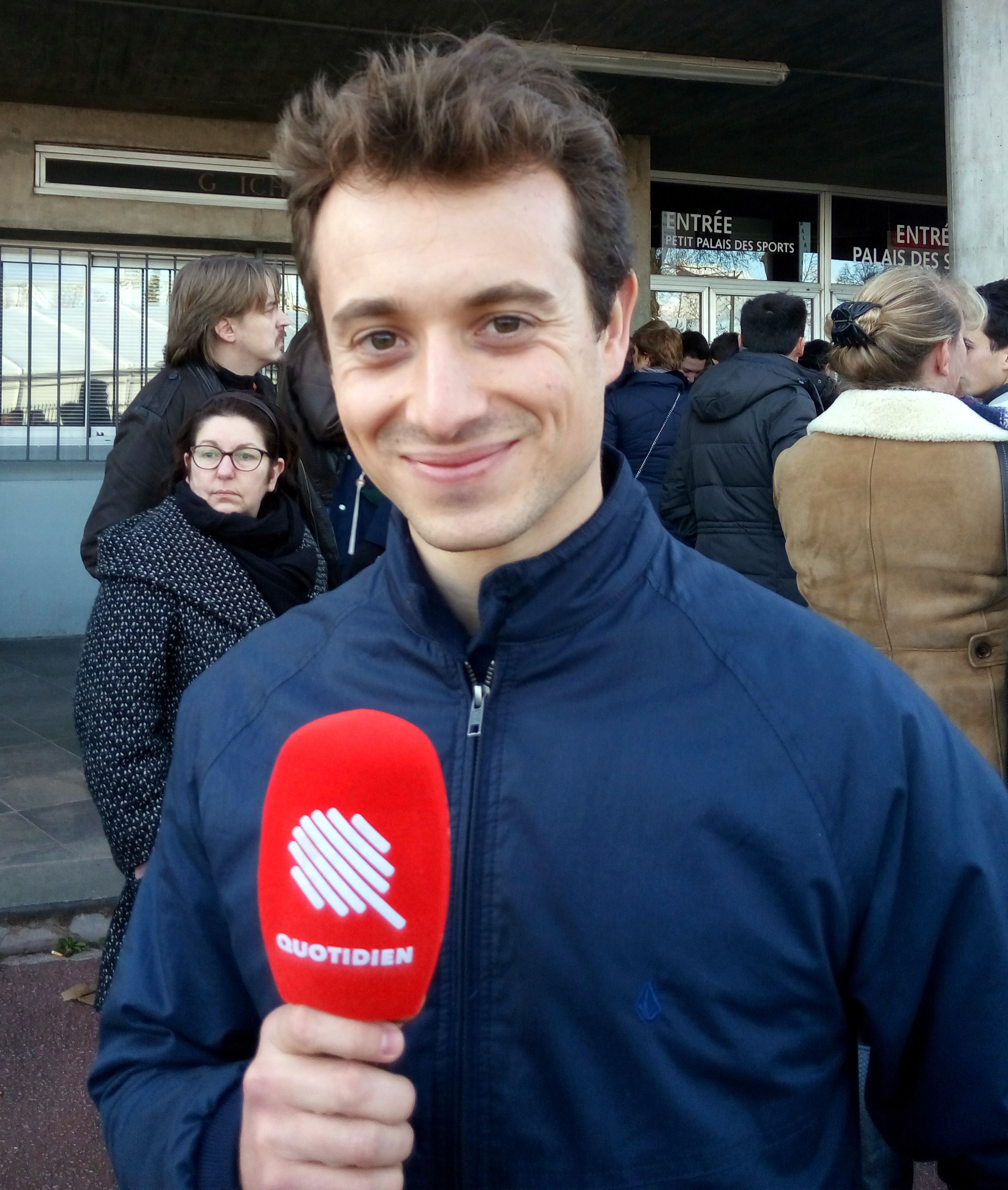
- Clément in 2017
- Born: Hugo Clément; 7 October 1989 (age 36); Strasbourg, France
- Education: Sciences Po Toulouse; École supérieure de journalisme de Lille
- Occupations: Journalist, author, documentary filmmaker
- Years active: 2012–present
- Notable credits: Le Petit Journal (2015–2016); Quotidien (2016–2017); Konbini (2017–2019); France 2 (2019–present); Vakita (2023–present)
- Partner: Alexandra Rosenfeld
- Children: 1

Hugo Clément (born 7 October 1989) is a French journalist, author, and documentary filmmaker known for his investigative reporting and environmental advocacy. He began his career at France 2 before gaining national attention through his work on Le Petit Journal and Quotidien, and later with the digital media outlet Konbini.

Since 2019, Clément has produced and presented documentaries for France Télévisions, focusing on ecological and social issues. In 2023, he founded Vakita, an independent platform dedicated to environmental journalism. Clément is also the author of several books and is an outspoken supporter of animal rights and biodiversity protection.

== Early life ==
Born in Strasbourg, Clément grew up in a suburb of Toulouse. His parents were university professors. He attended Lycée Bellevue in Toulouse, earning his Baccalauréat, and later joined a Hypokhâgne preparatory class at Lycée Rive Gauche.

In 2008, he entered Sciences Po Toulouse, and started working as a freelance journalist for La Dépêche du Midi and 20 Minutes. In 2010, he joined the Lille School of Journalism (École supérieure de journalisme de Lille) and graduated in 2012. During his studies, he received the Jean d'Arcy bursary, which included a contract with France 2.

== Career ==
Clément began his career at France 2, covering major events such as the 2014 fire at Maison de la Radio, the Charlie Hebdo shooting, the 2015 Nepal earthquake, and the Brétigny-sur-Orge train crash.

In 2015, he joined Le Petit Journal on Canal+, later moving to Quotidien on TMC alongside Yann Barthès. His reporting style, often direct and investigative, gained attention. In 2016, he questioned Jean-Yves Le Drian, then Minister of Armed Forces, about holding both a ministerial role and the presidency of Brittany's regional council. Le Drian accused Le Petit Journal of filming his residence, which Clément denied, stating that only security personnel were filmed as part of a Vigipirate report. In 2017, Clément left Quotidien to join Konbini, where he focused on political and environmental reporting. In 2019, he returned to France 2 as part of a broader initiative to expand the network's digital news coverage.

In 2023, he launched Vakita, a digital media platform covering environmental and social issues, backed by Groupe Artémis and Mediawan. In early 2025, Clément's documentary on invasive species, part of Sur le front series, featured an interview with CNRS researcher Dirk Schmeller. Following its broadcast on France 5, the CNRS publicly distanced itself from the scientist’s remarks and described the programme as a “simulacrum of investigation”.

== Positions and public engagement ==
Clément is an advocate for environmental and animal rights issues. He has produced documentaries on climate change, biodiversity loss, and plastic pollution. In April 2023, he participated in the Grand débat des valeurs, hosted by the conservative magazine Valeurs actuelles, alongside Jordan Bardella of the Rassemblement National (RN). His participation drew criticism from left-wing and environmentalist figures, who accused him of legitimising far-right media. Clément defended his decision, stating that environmental issues should be debated across the political spectrum.

In July 2024, he signed an online petition for the release of Paul Watson, arrested by the Danish police in Greenland following a 2012 Interpol red notice.

== Works ==
- Clément, Hugo (2019). Comment j'ai arrêté de manger les animaux. Paris: Éditions du Seuil. ISBN 978-2-02-141759-3.
- Clément, Hugo (2020). Journal de guerre écologique. Paris: Fayard. ISBN 978-2-213-71703-6.
- Clément, Hugo (2022). Les lapins ne mangent pas de carottes. Paris: Fayard. ISBN 978-2-213-71712-8.
- Clément, Hugo; Mermoux, Dominique; Ravalec, Vincent (2023). Le théorème du Vaquita. Paris: Fayad Graffik. ISBN 978-2-213-72584-0.

== Personal life ==
Clement has a child with 2006 French beauty pageant titleholder Alexandra Rosenfeld.
