= Le Petit Journal (TV programme) =

- Presented by: Cyrille Eldin (2016 – present); Yann Barthès (2004 – 2016)
- Country of origin: France

Production
- Production locations: Studios Rive Gauche; Paris, France
- Running time: 30–40 minutes (since September 2015) around 25 minutes (August 2011 – August 2015) around 8 minutes (August 2004 – July 2011)

Original release
- Network: Canal+
- Release: August 30, 2004 – June 22, 2017

Le Petit Journal (pronounced [lə pəti ʒuʁnal]) is a French news and entertainment television program that airs every weekday on Canal+, presented by Cyrille Eldin. It was hosted by journalist Yann Barthès from its beginnings in 2004 through to June 2016. The program initially aired as a segment of Le Grand Journal until 2011, when it became a separate program. Eldin took over the show after Barthès left Canal+ to start a new programme on TF1 named Quotidien.

== Format ==
In the Yann Barthès era, Le Petit Journal featured several regular contributors. Martin Weill was the programme's envoyé spécial, or special correspondent, delivering reports from around the world. The show also featured several comedy acts. Comedians Éric Metzger and Quentin Margot appeared in topical sketches based on events in the news. Alex Lutz and Bruno Sanchez appeared in a section titled La revue de presse de Catherine et Liliane playing a pair of middle-aged women working in the office of Le Petit Journal . The rapper-comedians Orelsan and Gringe appeared in a series of comedy shorts, Bloqués. Only Catherine et Liliane continued on the show after Barthès left, while much of the rest of the team joined Barthès on his new show, Quotidien.

== History ==
On 9 May 2016 it was announced that Yann Barthès would be leaving the show after 23 June 2016. On the same day the TF1 Group announced that it had recruited Barthès to present two new programmes: a daily show on its channel TMC and a weekly show on the TF1 channel. The future of Le Petit Journal was uncertain; the owner of Canal+, Vincent Bolloré, had earlier demanded that the show reduce its production costs, and had suggested that it be removed from the network's free-to-air programming and made available only to the network's paying subscribers. Canal+ later announced that Barthès would be replaced as presenter of Le Petit Journal by Cyrille Eldin.

The first episode of Le Petit Journal in the Cyrille Eldin era was broadcast on 5 September 2016. The newspaper Libération described the show as sexist, badly produced, and unfunny, and accused Eldin of egotism for appearing on screen almost constantly throughout the programme. By the Thursday of the first week, the show was being watched by 590,000 viewers, representing a little over a half of the viewing figures that the show regularly attracted under Barthès.

== Incidents ==
During the 2008 United States presidential campaign, Le Petit Journal caused some confusion and curiosity on the Internet when its crew members installed themselves, along with several joking banners, in the background of American news shows broadcast from New York City. On the night of the election, they joined New Yorkers in Times Square and held aloft a large banner bearing the word "Cassoulet". This was clearly visible during a live broadcast on ABC News; the network's host George Stephanopoulos said on air, "I want to know who 'Cassoulet' is."

Le Petit Journal again came to the attention of American audiences after it satirized reports by Fox News, in the wake of the January 2015 Île-de-France attacks, claiming the existence of Muslim-dominated no-go areas in Paris.
