= Lynn Hill =

American rock climber (born 1961)

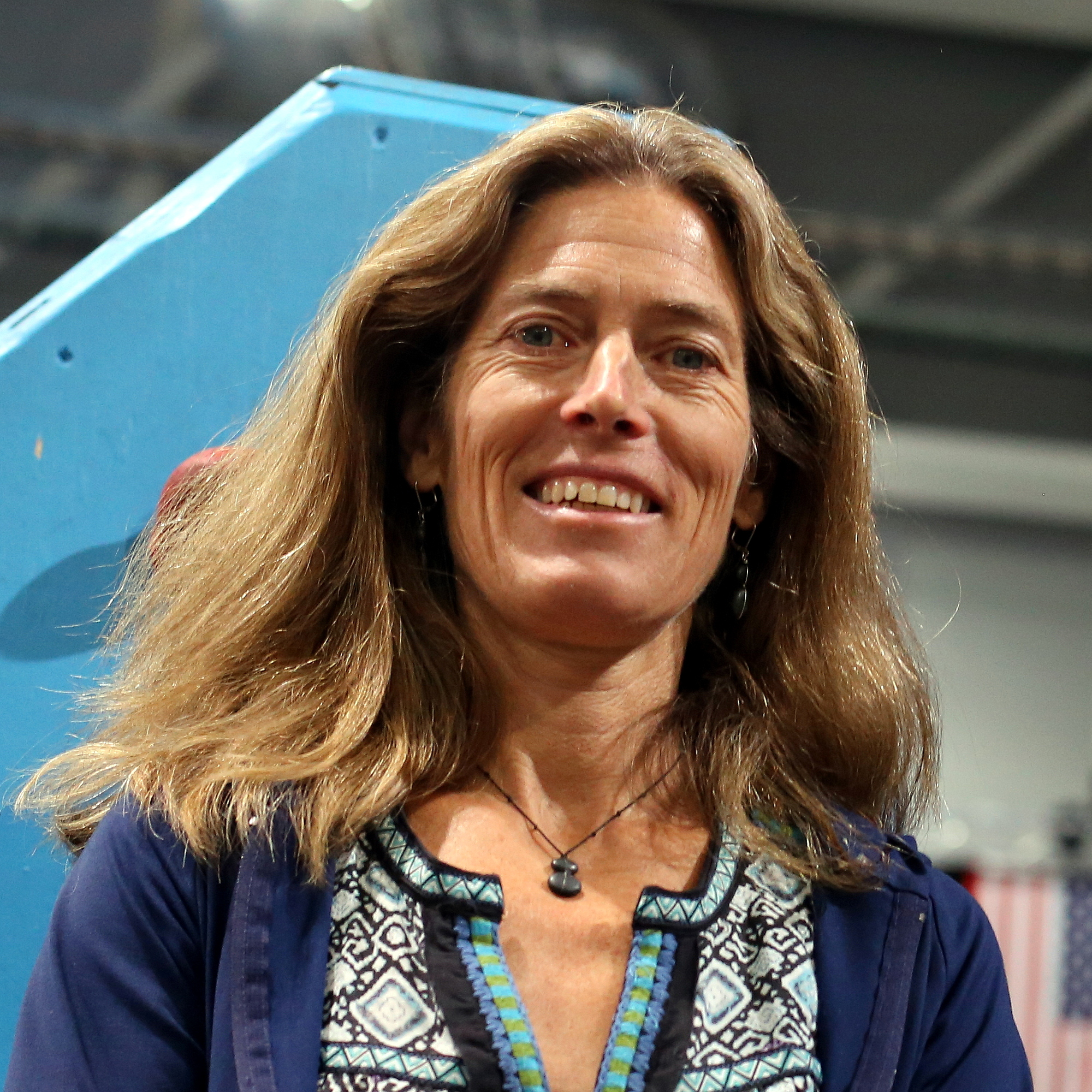
- Hill in Stavanger in 2015

Personal information
- Born: January 3, 1961 (age 65) Detroit, Michigan, US
- Height: 5 ft 2 in (157 cm)
- Weight: 110 lb (50 kg) (1993)
- Website: lynnhillclimbing.com

Climbing career
- Type of climber: Competition climbing; Sport climbing; Big wall climbing; Traditional climbing; Bouldering
- Highest grade: Redpoint: 8b+/c (5.14a/b); Onsight/Flash: 8a (5.13b); Bouldering: 7B+ (V8)
- First ascents: The Nose (870 metres, 31-pitches, 1993, 5.14a)
- Known for: First free ascent (FFA) of The Nose of El Capitan; First 24-hour FFA of The Nose; First-ever woman to redpoint 7b (5.12b), 7b+ (5.12c), 7c (5.12d), 7c+ (5.13a), and 8b+ (5.14a); First-ever woman to onsight 8a (5.13b)
Medal record
Women's competition climbing
Representing United States
Sport Roccia
Silver medal – second place	1986	Lead
Rock Master
Winner	1987	Lead
Winner	1988	Lead
Winner	1989	Lead
Winner	1990	Lead
Winner	1992	Lead
IFSC Climbing World Cup
Winner	1990	Lead
Third place	1992	Lead

Carolynn Marie Hill (born January 3, 1961) is an American rock climber. Widely regarded as one of the leading competition climbers, traditional climbers (and particularly big wall climbers), sport climbers, and boulderers in the world during the late 1980s and early 1990s, she is famous for making the first free ascent of the difficult sheer rock face of The Nose on El Capitan in Yosemite Valley, and for repeating it the next year in less than 24 hours. She has been described as both one of the best female climbers in the world and one of the best climbers in the history of the sport. Hill was the first-ever female in history to redpoint a 5.12d (7c), 5.13a (7c+) and 5.14a (8b+) graded sport climbing route. Hill shaped rock climbing for women and became a public spokesperson, helping it gain wider popularity and arguing for sex equality. Hill has publicized climbing by appearing on television shows and documentaries and writing an autobiography, Climbing Free: My Life in the Vertical World.

Hill was a gymnast early in life, nearly broke a world record lifting weights, and ran competitively. She took to climbing at a young age, showing a natural aptitude for the activity, and became a part of the climbing community in Southern California and Camp 4 in Yosemite Valley. She traveled around the United States during the early 1980s climbing increasingly difficult routes and setting records for first female ascents and for first ascents. From 1986 to 1992 Hill was one of the world's most accomplished competition climbers, winning over thirty international titles, including five victories at the Arco Rock Master. This coincided with the era when the leading female climbers caught up with the leading men. In 1992, Hill left competitive climbing and returned to traditional climbing. She set for herself the challenge of free climbing The Nose of El Capitan, her greatest climbing feat. Hill continues to climb and has not stopped taking on ambitious climbs. As of 2013, she was a sponsored athlete for the Patagonia gear and clothing company and owned a small business that offered climbing courses.

== Early years ==
=== Childhood ===
Born in Detroit, Michigan, Hill grew up in Fullerton, California. She is the fifth of seven children; her mother was a dental hygienist and her father an aerospace engineer. She was an active child who climbed everything from trees to street lights. Starting at age eight, she learned gymnastics but disliked the way girls "had to smile and do cutesy little routines on the floor". Thus, even though she was part of a successful YMCA gymnastics team that competed in southern California and performed in halftime shows for the California Angels, she quit at the age of 12. In her autobiography, Hill describes feeling "resistant to rules", an attitude she identified as both normal for her age and influenced by the era in which she grew up: "My awareness of issues like women's rights and the struggle for racial freedom began to grow". She even questioned the chores assigned in her family, noting the differences between the boys and girls—the boys had weekly tasks while the girls had daily tasks. During high school, Hill took up gymnastics again and became one of the top gymnasts in her state, a skill that eventually contributed to her climbing success. In particular, the ability to conceptualize a series of complex movements as small, distinct ones and to thrive under pressure gave Hill a significant edge.

=== Introduction to climbing ===
In 1975, Hill's sister, Kathy Hill and her sister's fiancé, Chuck Bludworth, took her on her first climbing trip; she was hooked, leading from the first day. For Hill, this activity became an escape from the emotional turmoil of her parents' divorce, and "by her late teens she identified less with her imperfect family in Orange County than with an 'imperfect family of friends' at climbing areas". Hill took her first trip to Yosemite, a central destination for climbers, at the age of 16, where she was introduced to the climbers at Camp 4. There she met Charlie Row, her first boyfriend. Their romance flourished; with him she climbed her first 5.11 and first big wall.

As a young teenager, Hill climbed in southern California, primarily in Joshua Tree National Park. She earned money for day trips out to the park by working at a Carl's Jr. Bludworth initially taught her climbing culture; he subscribed to magazines and read books which Hill then devoured. She was influenced in particular by Yvon Chouinard's ethic of "leaving no trace" on the rock. Moreover, the climbing of Beverly Johnson captured her imagination, particularly Johnson's 10-day solo of Dihedral Wall on El Capitan. As Hill explains in her autobiography, "I was awed, but not just by the know-how and hard work she'd put into her ascent. It was the courage and confidence that it took to put herself on the line, to do something on the cutting edge—to climb one of the world's greatest big walls in one of the most challenging ways possible: solo. She had succeeded and she'd given women climbers like me enormous confidence to be ourselves and not feel limited by being a minority in a male-dominated sport."

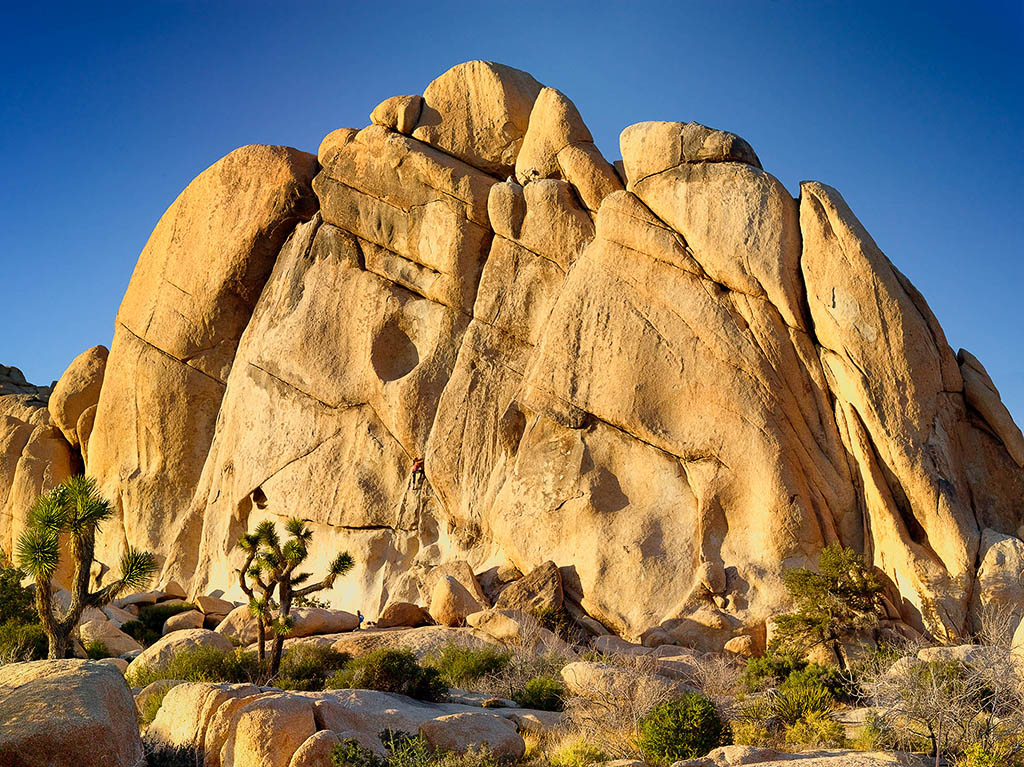
Hill spent her earliest years climbing in Joshua Tree National Park.

Hill attended Fullerton College in the late 1970s, but she did not have a strong interest in any academic subject; instead she was focused on climbing. In the summers of 1976–78 and the early 1980s Hill frequently camped at Camp 4 in Yosemite Valley, becoming part of the climbing community centered there and joining the search and rescue team. In her autobiography, Hill describes the community as "a ragged occupying army, annoying park rangers by eluding camp fees, overstaying their welcome, and comporting themselves like gypsies". As Hill describes it, climbing in the late 1970s and early 1980s was "something that people who were outcasts in society did, people who were not conformists". As she had earlier, Hill worked in order to be able to climb. One summer, she writes, she survived in Camp 4 on only $75. In her autobiography, she describes how climbers eked out a life at the camp, recycling cans to pay for climbing ropes and subsisting on condiments and left-over food from tourists. However, Hill remembers "these dirt-poor days ... [as] among the best and the most carefree of my life, and though my friends were often scoundrels, I felt their friendship convincingly."

Beverly Johnson had previously started to bridge the gender gap at Camp 4, but it remained strongly male-dominated. The community was particularly homosocial; its major historian calls it "edgy" rather than "oppressive" and argues that there was pressure on women to perform to men's standards and that "women had to contend with an army of men trying to maintain Camp 4 as a guy's domain". There was no coherent female climbing community; rather, female climbers tended to adopt the masculine attitudes of their compatriots. In her autobiography, Hill writes that climbing "back then was directed by a fraternity of men, and there was little encouragement of, or frankly, inclination for women to participate. Yet women climbers were out there." For example, from age 18 to 22, Hill climbed with Mari Gingery every weekend, completing an ascent of The Nose and then the first female-only ascent of The Shield on El Capitan over a period of six days.

Hill learned the essence of her climbing technique from the Stonemasters group during this time. She adopted the attitudes of traditional climbing, a style of climbing which emphasizes using removable protection rather than bolts (which scar the rock) and rewards climbers who climb a new route from bottom to top without stopping or starting over. She also became a dedicated free climber, which emphasizes climbing an entire route without hanging on the rope or relying on equipment to skip difficult sections. Early on she was a fearless climber but after "a few death-defying experiences on routes with long run-outs" she learned to be wary of falling.

Hill climbed with and became involved with climber John Long at the end of the 1970s. Their relationship began in the summer of 1978 when she heard him recite a poem he had written about a female climber and what kind of man she wanted.Hill and Long climbed together and worked out together, lifting weights and running. It was at his suggestion that she attempted to break the world record for the bench press in her weight class (105 pounds (48 kg)); however, while she could easily lift 150 pounds (68 kg) while training, in competition she froze. Hill and Long spent the winter of 1981 in Las Vegas, Nevada, climbing during the day and working nights at "dead end jobs" like pizza waitress.

The following year Hill and Long moved from Las Vegas to Santa Monica, California, where she attended Santa Monica College (SMC) and majored in biology. She was recruited by the track coach even though she had no competitive running experience. After training for a few months, she placed third in the 1500 meters and fourth in the 3000 meters at the state meet, helping SMC to win the state championship. To make ends meet, she worked at an outdoor store, as a gym teacher, and occasionally appeared on daredevil television shows.

In 1983, Hill was interviewed by Ultrasport. They offered her a free flight to New York for the interview and as part of the trip she was taken to the Shawangunks, a famous nearby climbing area. Finding she liked the climbing environment and yearning for some new challenges, she decided to stay and moved to New Paltz, New York. At the same time, Long was preparing for a journey to Borneo and embarking on a career as a writer. The couple went their separate ways but remained friends. After moving to New York, Hill attended the State University of New York at New Paltz and graduated with a degree in biology in 1985.

== Climbing career ==
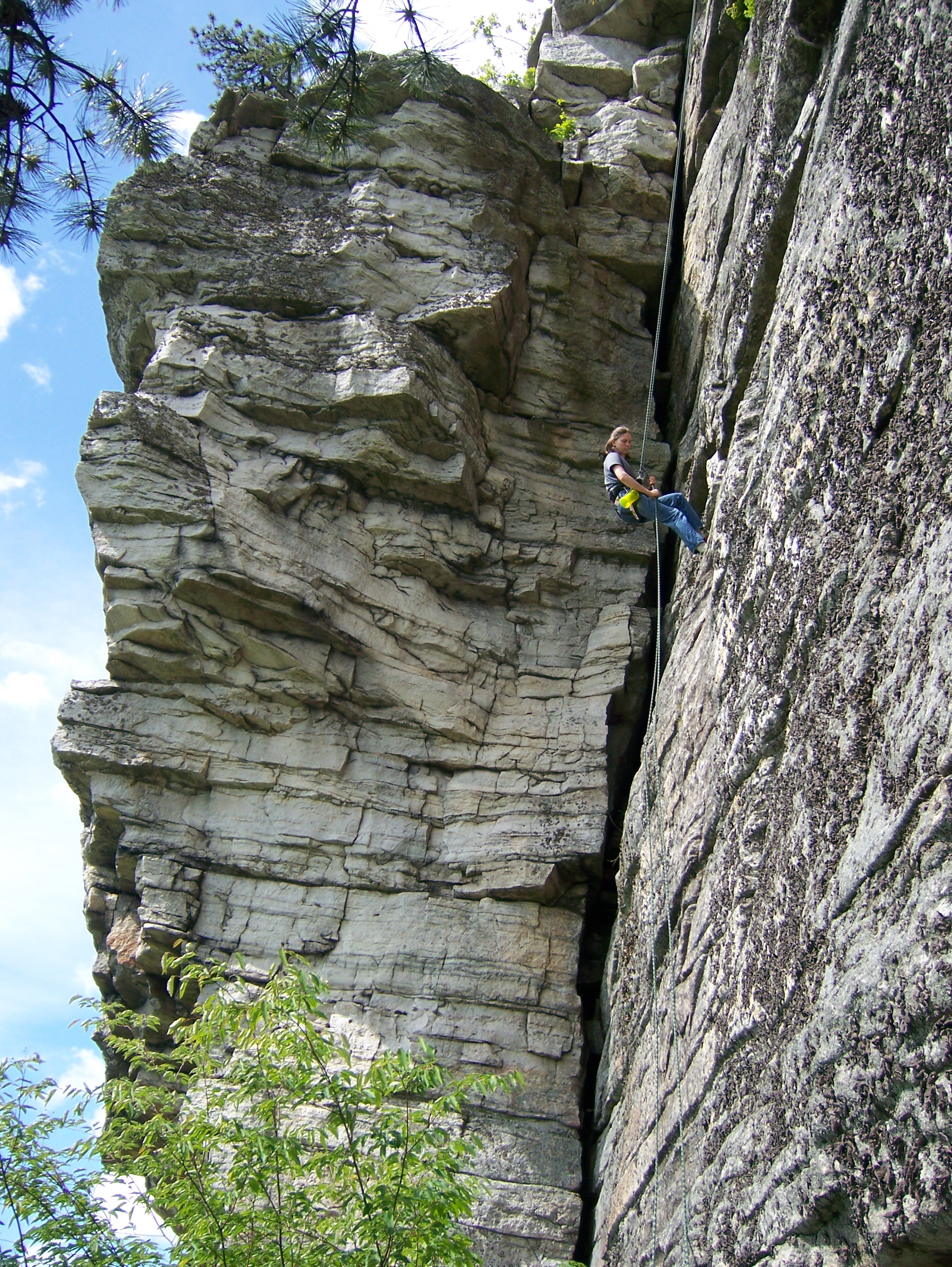
Hill became a world-renowned climber in The Gunks. (Another person pictured)

Hill started to participate in climbing competitions in the mid-1980s, but one of her first significant accomplishments was in 1979. She became the first person to free climb Ophir Broke in Ophir, Colorado, which has a difficulty rating of 5.12d and was the hardest route ever climbed by a woman at that time. It was the hardest crack climb in Colorado at the time and there were only one or two harder ones in Yosemite. Long was amazed by her feat. He has said "that's when I knew for certain that this woman had extraordinary talent". The regional guidebook credits Long with the first free ascent of the route; Hill speculates the reason for this is that at the time she was an unknown climber and known only as Long's partner and protege. In her autobiography, Hill explains that it was during this climb that she realized it is not a person's size or strength but ability to be creative on the rock that is important: "The big lesson for me ... was to realize that despite what appeared to be a limitation due to my small stature, I could create my own method of getting past a difficult section of rock. John's size and power enabled him to make long reaches and explosive lunge moves that were completely out of my range. I, on the other hand, often found small intermediate holds that John couldn't even imagine gripping ... Short or tall, man or woman, the rock is an objective medium that is equally open for interpretation by all."

Living near the Shawangunks during her college years, Hill pioneered many new free climbing routes. In 1984 at The Gunks she performed an on-sight first ascent of Yellow Crack (5.12c) and Vandals (5.13a); Vandals was the most difficult route on the East Coast at the time and the area's first climb of its grade. Her lead of Yellow Crack was a very dangerous ascent, her climbing partner at the time Russ Ruffa calling it "one of the boldest leads I've ever seen ... I had tried leading it. I knew you had to totally commit to doing the moves, otherwise the chance of surviving would be minimal. Those are the moments that really stand out—when you see someone totally on the edge." It was her climb of Vandals that led Hill to reconsider her climbing style; rather than begin the climb again every time she fell or leaned on the rope for support, she hung on the rope in her harness to gain more information about the climb. As she writes in her autobiography, "In one moment I had, to some degree, thrown out years of climbing philosophy ... The subtle advantage of hanging on the rope to figure out the crux moves gave me the added information that helped me learn and eventually succeed on the route. The old style of climbing suddenly seemed rigid, limited, and contrived." That year, she performed a series of impressive feats, leading Tourist Treat on-sight with only one fall, "perhaps the most difficult first ascent in the north country at the time". She was arguably "the best climber in the Gunks", as local climbing legend Kevin Bein called her, and "no man was climbing significantly better" than her.

=== Competitive career ===
As a result of Hill's impressive climbs in The Gunks, she was invited to climb in Europe in 1986. The French Alpine Club invited a group of elite American climbers to climb in the Verdon Gorge, Fontainebleau, and Buoux. Hill felt an immediate affinity for French culture and climbing. She particularly enjoyed climbing on the limestone common in France because it has many pockets and edges, producing "wildly acrobatic climbs" with low risk. Moreover, these types of climbs are ideal for people of small stature, like Hill. She tried sport climbing in France for the first time that year. Inspired and intrigued by European climbing culture, she returned later and took part in Arco e Bardonecchia Sportroccia '86, the second edition of the first international sport climbing competition, which later became the Rock Master annual event. The event was divided into two stages, one in Arco and one in Bardonecchia, Italy. She competed against other women on extremely difficult routes, gaining points for style and speed. She lost to Catherine Destivelle in a "disputed ruling" but won in the following year. Destivelle in her autobiography, reckons she won that year because she planned to climb fast from the beginning, as speed was decisive in case of equality, which she doubts Hill was aware of when starting the competition. In an interview, Hill has said that this first competition was "disorienting" because she did not understand the language, the "format" or the "judging" nor did the organizers of the competition. "There were a lot of politics involved, a lot of nationalism and disorganization. The rules seemed to change during the event. I remember asking about the disparity between prize money for men and women. The only response I got was, 'If the women climb without their tops, then we'll pay them the same.'" However, she continued with competition climbing because she found it stimulating to climb with "other strong women". In one interview, Hill said that "if there wasn't a Catherine Destivelle or Luisa Iovane ... or whoever there, then it would be anticlimactic." Destivelle became Hill's main competition in the late 1980s while Isabelle Patissier emerged to challenge her in the early 1990s.

I'd been a child during the 1960s when women burned their bras and hundreds of thousands gathered in protests against the Vietnam War. As a climber, I've felt connected to a similar nonconformist culture, one opposed to society's increasing materialism, pollution and corruption. Our approach to the rock—clean, traditional climbing, with the least dependence on equipment—was an extension of this ethical viewpoint.

— Lynn Hill

She became a professional climber in 1988 and the subsequent interviews, photoshoots and media appearances led to her becoming a spokesperson for climbing. As Hill explained, competition climbing is "such a different activity than going out and climbing on rock ... You're in front of all these people ... You're there to perform." From the beginning of her sport climbing career, Hill was aware that the sport was evolving and growing. For example, she pointed out in an interview that some competition organizers would chop down trees and alter rocks just for the sake of a competition; she could foresee that competitions would all eventually take place on artificial walls for environmental reasons.

Throughout the early 1980s, Hill had remained a traditionalist, but after her 1986 trip to Europe, she started adopting many sport climbing techniques. For instance, she had resisted hang-dogging (hanging on the rope at any point during the climb), holding with the philosophy that it was cheating, but after experimenting with it during her ascent of Vandals, she found it a useful way to learn challenging climbs. During the mid-1980s, there was great tension in the climbing community between traditionalists and new sport climbers. There was even a "Great Debate" in 1986 at the American Alpine Club at which a panel of all-star participants—including Hill—were invited to discuss the merits of the two different styles, especially sport climbing that required the insertion of fixed bolts into the rock. Hill has argued that "the purpose of climbing is to adapt yourself to the rock. You work on yourself to overcome the obstacle of the rock ... I believe climbers should leave the rock as unaltered as possible ... you have a responsibility not only to put in safe bolts but to put them in logical places—to do the least possible alteration of the rock to establish the best possible experience for others".

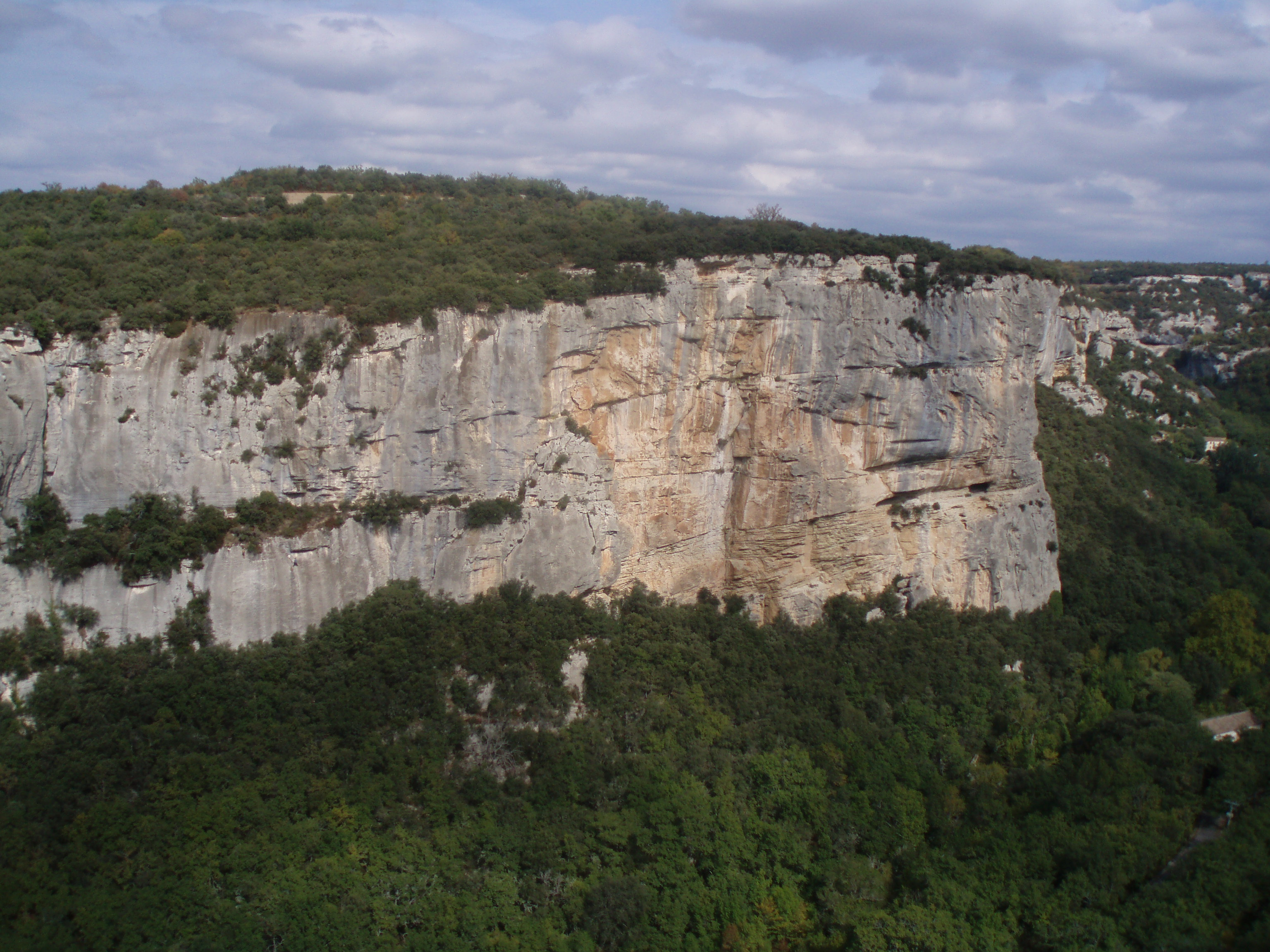
Hill fell 72 ft (22 m) while climbing at the cliffs at Buoux, Haute Provence, but was back on the rock only six weeks later.

From 1986 to 1992 Hill was one of the world's top sport climbers, winning over thirty international titles, including five victories at the Arco Rock Master. This coincided with the era when the leading female climbers caught up with the leading men. In 1990, at the final stage of the World Cup Final, she was one of three competitors and the only woman to reach the top of the wall—and the only climber to complete the hardest move. As Joseph Taylor writes in his history of climbers of Yosemite, "at that moment Lynn Hill was arguably the best climber in the world, male or female". Hill describes this as her most satisfying win because her competition—Isabelle Patissier—received information on how to do the final climb from the men who had already finished it. Moreover, Hill was starting with zero points in the competition because she had made a mistake in the previous competition, so she had to win big or not at all (the World Cup consisted of a series of competitions in which the participants were given points for a variety of climbing techniques). "It took all of my effort and concentration to pull through the route. The moves I had to make were really spectacular, but I managed to do them. I was so excited to get to the top ... I proved a point about women and what we're capable of—a lot of the best men had fallen off that route." As a professional climber, Hill was able during this time to support herself by doing what she loved; she made approximately half of her income from climbing competitions and half from sponsorships.

In January 1990, Hill set another landmark by becoming the first woman to redpoint a 5.14 (that is, she practiced free climbing the route before she was able to successfully climb it), Masse Critique in Cimaï, France. J.B. Tribout, who first ascended the route, challenged Hill, saying no woman would ever be able to climb it—Hill completed it in fewer tries than Tribout, after "nine days of exhausting effort". In 1992, it was described as the hardest rock climb ever made by a woman.

Hill has experienced only one major accident in her climbing career. On May 9, 1989, she fell during a climb in Buoux, France; after being distracted when starting to tie a safety rope (with her intended bowline), she fell 72 ft (22 m) into a tree, and was knocked unconscious, dislocated her left elbow and broke a bone in her foot. She had been training hard for the World Cup and had to stop competing for a few months to recover; she was devastated to miss the first World Cup in the sport. However, only six weeks after her fall, she was back climbing.

=== The Nose ===
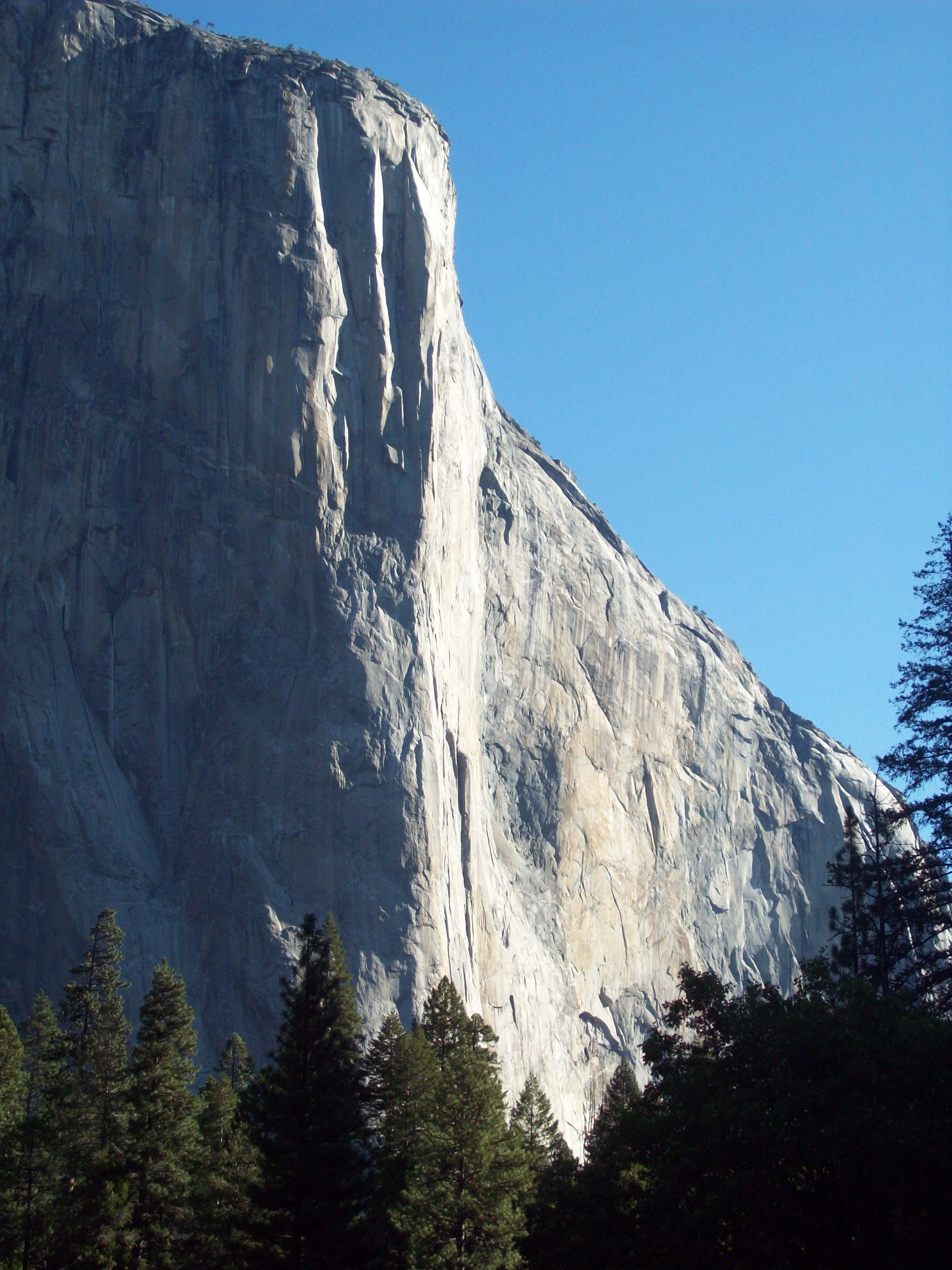
The Nose on El Capitan has a 2,900-foot (900 m) vertical gain.

Hill did not regard sport climbing to be real climbing and felt out of place on the professional indoor climbing World Cup circuit, so she left in 1992 and went back to traditional rock climbing. As she explained in an interview, "the thing I didn't like too much towards the end was how focused it was on just indoor climbing and training. I didn't start out training on artificial walls, and that's not really ever something that I wanted to do as a full-time profession". In her autobiography, she also comments on the "bad sportsmanship, rule bending, and monumental egos that infested the competitions". She looked for different challenges and set herself the task of free climbing (that is, using climbing aids only to protect her from falls) The Nose, a famous route on El Capitan in Yosemite Valley.

Asked why she was motivated to climb The Nose, Hill has said:

At the end of my competition career I felt like things were evolving more towards the indoor format and it really wasn't how I started to climb and it didn't represent the values of climbing in a complete way and so I decided I would do something like this as a retirement gesture. John Long said 'hey Lynnie you should go up and try to free climb The Nose'. So it just happened to be the perfect goal for me and I liked the fact this climb was in Yosemite because I remember going there and just seeing the valley and it was just mind blowing how beautiful it was. I couldn't imagine a more beautiful place anywhere in the world. For me The Nose was much bigger than me, it wasn't about me, it wasn't about my ego, my gratification it was actually something that I wanted to do. I felt like I had a chance and that if I could do that it would be a really big statement to people to think about. You don't have to be a man to do something that's 'out there' as a first ascent. Obviously people tried to do that route and they failed on it and so if a lot of good climbers have come and tried to do it and failed and a woman comes and does it first it's really meaningful. That was my underlying motivation.

Hill first attempted to free climb The Nose in 1989 with Simon Nadin, a British climber she had met at the World Cup that year. Although he had never climbed big walls, she felt at ease around him and both had a background in traditional climbing; they both shared a desire to free climb The Nose and agreed within hours of meeting to try the feat together. Their attempt to free climb The Nose failed. Four years later, in 1993, together with her partner Brooke Sandahl, she became the first person to ever free climb the route. Hill's original climbing grade for the "Free Nose" was 5.13b. One of the most difficult pitches—Changing Corners—she rated at a 5.13b/c, but she wrote in her autobiography that "rating the difficulty of such a pitch is almost impossible" and "the most accurate grade would be to call it 'once, or maybe twice, in a lifetime'". The rock face is nearly blank and there are next to no holds; to ascend the section, Hill had to use a "carefully coordinated sequence of opposite pressures between [her] feet, hands, elbows, and hips against the shallow walls of the corner" as well as turn her body completely around.

The next year, in 1994 she surpassed this achievement, by becoming the first person to free climb the entire route in a single 24-hour period. Usually the climb takes four to six days (Hill had previously done it in four) and most climbers are aid climbing; that is, most climbers allow themselves to use mechanical aids to assist their climbing rather than just their own skill and bodies.

Hill wanted to join her effort with that of making a film that "would convey the history and spirit of climbing". Hill started endurance training in the spring for her summer ascent of The Nose, aiming to be able to on-sight a 5.13b after climbing all day. She trained in Provence and tested herself against Mingus in the Verdon Gorge, making the first on-sight free ascent of the route without a fall while simultaneously being the first woman to on-sight a 5.13b.

In her autobiography, Hill explains how she had "underestimated" how complicated climbing The Nose in a day would be with a film crew. Endless complications arose, such as the American coproducer backing out at the last minute, the soundman and cameraman refusing to rappel down the summit because they were afraid, and minor technical problems such as dead batteries. Hill herself had to coordinate many of the logistics because the producer had abandoned the project. Her first attempt to free climb The Nose in a day was plagued with problems. She ran out of chalk after 22 pitches, very nearly ran out of water and was taxed by the intense heat. She tried again soon after. On September 19 at 10 pm, she and her partner Steve Sutton, began the ascent again, this time without a film crew. After 23 hours, she had free climbed the entire route. In his book on the changing culture of Yosemite climbers, Joseph Taylor explains that Hill's ascent of The Nose demonstrates how climbing in the Yosemite Valley had altered from its origins in 1960s counterculture to become a "consumable experience". Hill staged what he describes as a "spectacle", filming the event "to capture the spontaneity of her one-day ascent", but she was only successful when not surrounded by a film crew.

The "Free Nose" and the "Free Nose in a day" remained unrepeated over 10 years after Hill's first ascents—despite numerous attempts by some of the best big wall climbers in the world. Over time, a consensus grade of 5.14a/b has emerged for the most difficult pitch, known as pitch 27 or Changing Corners, a fact which cements her Free Nose ascents as two of the most impressive achievements in climbing history. At the time, climbing legend Yvon Chouinard called it "the biggest thing that has ever been done on rock" and Alexander Huber later wrote that this climb "passed men's dominance in climbing and left them behind". He also regarded her statement upon completing the climb of "It goes, boys!" as reasonable although other climbers regarded it as provocative. The Nose saw a second free ascent in 1998, when Scott Burke summited after 261 days of effort. Then, on October 14, 2005, the team of Tommy Caldwell and Beth Rodden also free climbed The Nose, and on October 16, 2005, Caldwell did it in less than 12 hours.

=== World traveler ===
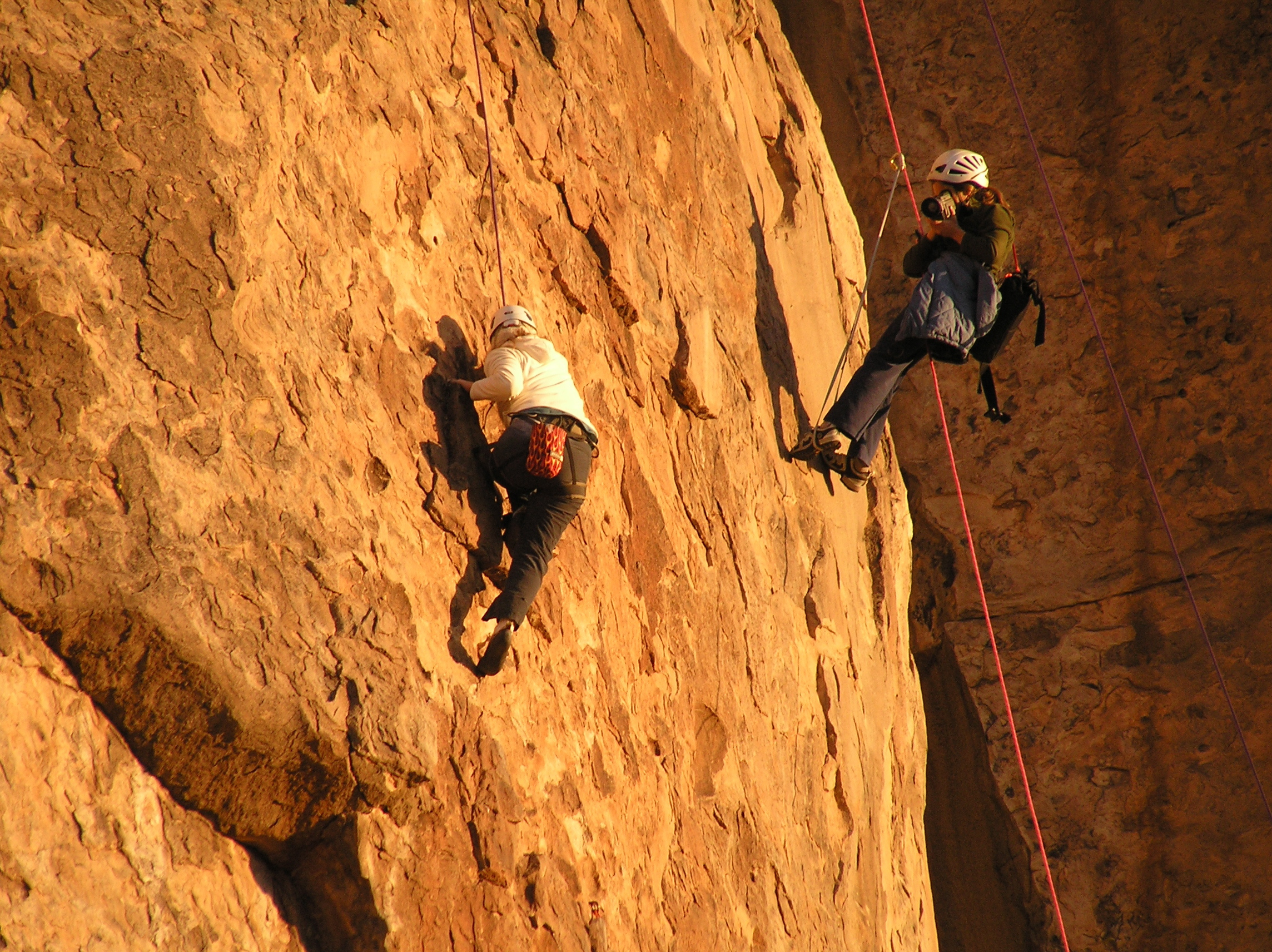
Hill videoing a climber at Hueco Tanks as part of Lynn Hill Climbing Camp

In 1995, Hill joined The North Face climbing team and was paid to travel around the world to climb. She first visited Kyrgyzstan's Karavshin Valley to climb with Alex Lowe, Kitty Calhoun, Jay Smith, Conrad Anker, Greg Child, Dan Osman, and Chris Noble. They camped for a month and were cut off from the world, without even a radio. In her autobiography, Hill writes that "such isolation made me feel vulnerable". Hill was not used to mountain climbing (as opposed to rock climbing) and the unpredictability of it unnerved her, with its increased risk of storms and rock slides. Furthermore, she liked focusing on the style of ascending rather than just summiting; she realized on this trip that her style of free climbing was not conducive to summiting or mountain climbing. Rather than pursue ever higher climbs, therefore, she chose to climb in new places, such as Morocco, Vietnam, Thailand, Scotland, Japan, Madagascar, Australia, and South America; many of these climbs were filmed and helped promote climbing in general.

Hill started offering climbing camps in five locations in the United States in 2005, with plans for more. For US$2,000, participants received five days of an "immersive adventure camp", including one-on-one coaching from Hill and other famous climbers. As of 2012 Hill was living in Boulder, Colorado, and still travelling widely. From Boulder she runs a small business offering climbing courses and also works as a technical adviser for various climbing gear companies. As of 2013, Hill was a sponsored athlete for the Patagonia gear and clothing company. While Hill used to easily obtain sponsorships, in 2010 she said in an interview that she was "too old" to obtain shoe sponsorships.

=== Gender politics ===
Hill repeatedly tells a story from when she was 14 years old and bouldering in Joshua Tree: she succeeded on a route when a man came over and commented how surprised he was that she could do the route because even he could not. "I thought, well, why would you expect that you automatically could do it? Just because I was a small girl, was I not to be able to do it? It was a memorable experience because it occurred to me then that other people had a different view of what I should or shouldn't be capable of doing. I think that people should just do whatever they can do or want to do. It shouldn't be a matter of if they're a man or a woman. It shouldn't be a matter of one's sex."

Long an advocate for gender equality in climbing, Hill has argued that men and women can climb the same routes: "I think they should have women compete on the same climbs as the men, and if the women can't do the climbs, then they shouldn't be competing". For example, she argued that both sexes compete on the same routes in World Cup competitions. However, Hill later revised her view, noting that while she could and did compete with men "spectators want to see people get to the top. And since most women aren't climbing at the same level as the top men, it's necessary to design a route that's a little easier for women". In answer to a question about whether or not women "will ever equal or surpass men in climbing", Hill gave a detailed response, focused on body composition, size, and psychology, explaining that climbing "favors people with high strength-to-weight ratios[s]", less body fat, and greater height, articulating that such characteristics often favor men but that women "have the advantage of being relatively light, with the capacity for tremendous endurance". She explained that "theoretically somebody as short as me could be the best in the world because it doesn't depend so much on height now ... And it's a psychological thing more than a physical thing."

Hill experienced discrimination throughout her climbing career and in an interview with John Stieger in Climbing, she pointed out that despite her success and prowess at climbing, this was a problem for her. She pointed to sexist remarks from male climbers who believed particular routes were impossible for female climbers and the fact that "there's a lot less importance and prestige placed on women in climbing, no matter what your ability is". Hill has also commented extensively about how American culture encourages women to be passive and to forego developing muscles, which makes it harder for them to excel at climbing. She lamented this trend and was happy that her family and friends had allowed her to be the "tomboy" she wanted to be. Hill has explained that when competing she is not competing against men or women but with people's expectations of what women can do.

Hill has been credited with bringing many women into rock climbing. The 1980s saw a large influx of women into the sport, in part because more women were visible in it and in part because Title IX funding mandated equal access for boys and girls to athletic programs in public schools. In answer to a question about her position as a role model for women climbers, Hill responded that she felt "responsible to communicate something that touches people, that inspires them, that gives them a sense of passion". Climber John Long explains that Hill "was a prodigy and everyone knew as much ... Twenty years ago, no female had ever climbed remotely as well as the best guys, so when Lynn began dusting us off—which she did with maddening frequency—folks offered up all kinds of fatuous explanations. Some diehards refused to believe a woman, and a five-foot article at that, could possibly be so good. Out at Josh, it was said Lynn shone owing to quartz monzonite's superior friction, which catered to her bantam weight. In Yosemite, her success apparently hinged on midget hands, which fit wonderfully into the infernal thin cracks. On limestone, she could plug three fingers into pockets where the rest of us managed two. In the desert Southwest, she enjoyed an alliance with coyotes—or maybe shape-shifters. Even after a heap of World Cup victories, it still took the climbing world an age to accept Lynn as the Chosen One, and perhaps her legacy was never established, once and for all, till she free climbed the Nose."

== Media ==
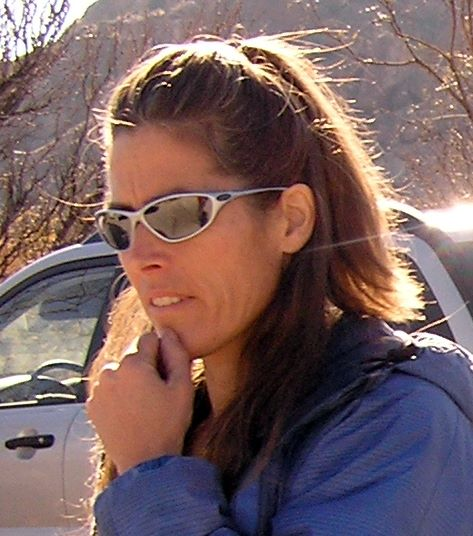
Hill in 2006

Hill has participated in various television productions, such as Survival of the Fittest, which she won four seasons in a row, from 1980 to 1984; she beat Olympic athletes at rope climbing and cross-country running. It was rock climbing legend and personal hero Beverly Johnson who first asked Hill to compete. The inaugural year of the competition, the first prize for the men in the competition was US$15,000 and for the women, US$5,000. Angered, Hill asked for parity, arguing that since the women were competing in four events and the men six, the women should at least be awarded $10,000. She proposed a boycott to the other female competitors, negotiating a deal with the producer that the prize money would be raised the next year and she could compete again. In her autobiography, Hill writes that she heard a rumor that NBC canceled the women's half of the show because the producers could not find anyone to beat her. She "became increasingly aware of how few women were pushing the limits of climbing and endurance like I was, and of how my passion had led me very much into a man's world". During the early 1980s Hill also appeared on The Guinness Game, That's Incredible!, and Ripley's Believe it or Not. She describes her feat of climbing over a hot-air balloon at 6,000 feet for That's Incredible! as "perhaps the most ridiculous stunt I ever did". Despite the earlier television appearances Hill attributes her fame to a 1982 poster for the company Patagonia that showed a photograph of her climbing.

In 1999, Hill appeared in Extreme, an IMAX film on adventure sports. For that production, she and Nancy Feagin had been filmed the previous May crack climbing in Indian Creek Valley in Utah. She also appeared in Vertical Frontier, a documentary about competitive climbing in California's Yosemite Valley.

In 2002, Hill collaboratively wrote an autobiography, Climbing Free: My Life in the Vertical World, with mountaineer and writer Greg Child, published by W.W. Norton & Company. As she describes the process, "He would take my writings and organize them, and he encouraged me to elaborate on certain elements. He emphasized that telling the story is what's important, so he really helped me think about what I wanted to say, and figure out who my audience was." Hill explained in an interview that writing about past events was easier because she had had time to reflect on them. She wanted to "convey the history and culture of free climbing", specifically how it became as specialized as it is today. She felt that she had a unique perspective to offer, both as someone who climbed at a particular moment in climbing history and as a woman: "And I wonder if a male writer would have presented that information differently. I think the book is important from that stand point [sic], because I am a woman, and there are not many female viewpoints on climbing, or the history of climbing, out there." Writing about climbing in the 1970s, 1980s, and 1990s was dominated by men. As accomplished American climber and writer Rachel de Silva explains, the six major American climbing magazines published fewer than 12 articles a year by or about women during the 1980s despite women comprising 40% of climbers. It was not until 1990 that the first women-centric climbing books appeared.

== Personal life ==
Hill met fellow Gunks climber Russ Raffa on her first trip to New York and by 1984 he had become "her constant companion". On October 22, 1988, the two married At the same time, Hill moved to Grambois, France, to pursue her climbing career; she settled there because of the world-class climbing areas in the Lubéron region and the many friends she had there. While living and climbing in Europe, Hill became fluent in both French and Italian.

Hill met her partner as of 2004, chef Brad Lynch, on a climbing trip in Moab, Utah, and at the age of 42, she gave birth to a son. Hill has spoken frequently about how having a child lessened the amount of time she had for climbing but not her love for it. As she said in one interview, "I feel that right now, it doesn't have to be all about me and my experiences. I was ready to begin a new role; to face new challenges and adventures as a mother. It's a good learning experience adjusting to the sacrifices that need to be made."

In 2015 she was inducted into the Boulder (Colorado) Sports Hall of Fame.

== Notable ascents ==
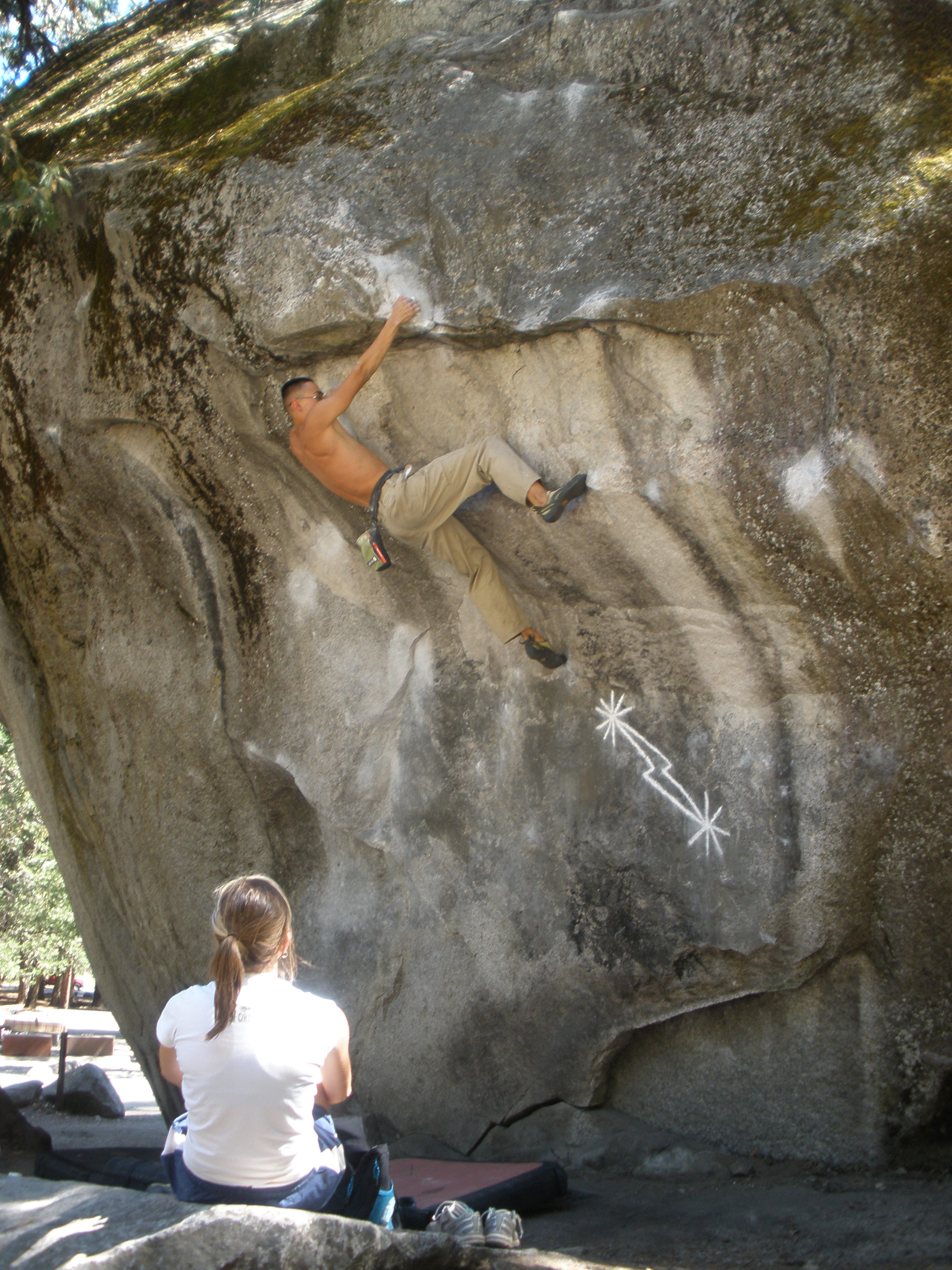
Hill made the first female ascent of Yosemite's Midnight Lightning in 1998. (Others pictured)

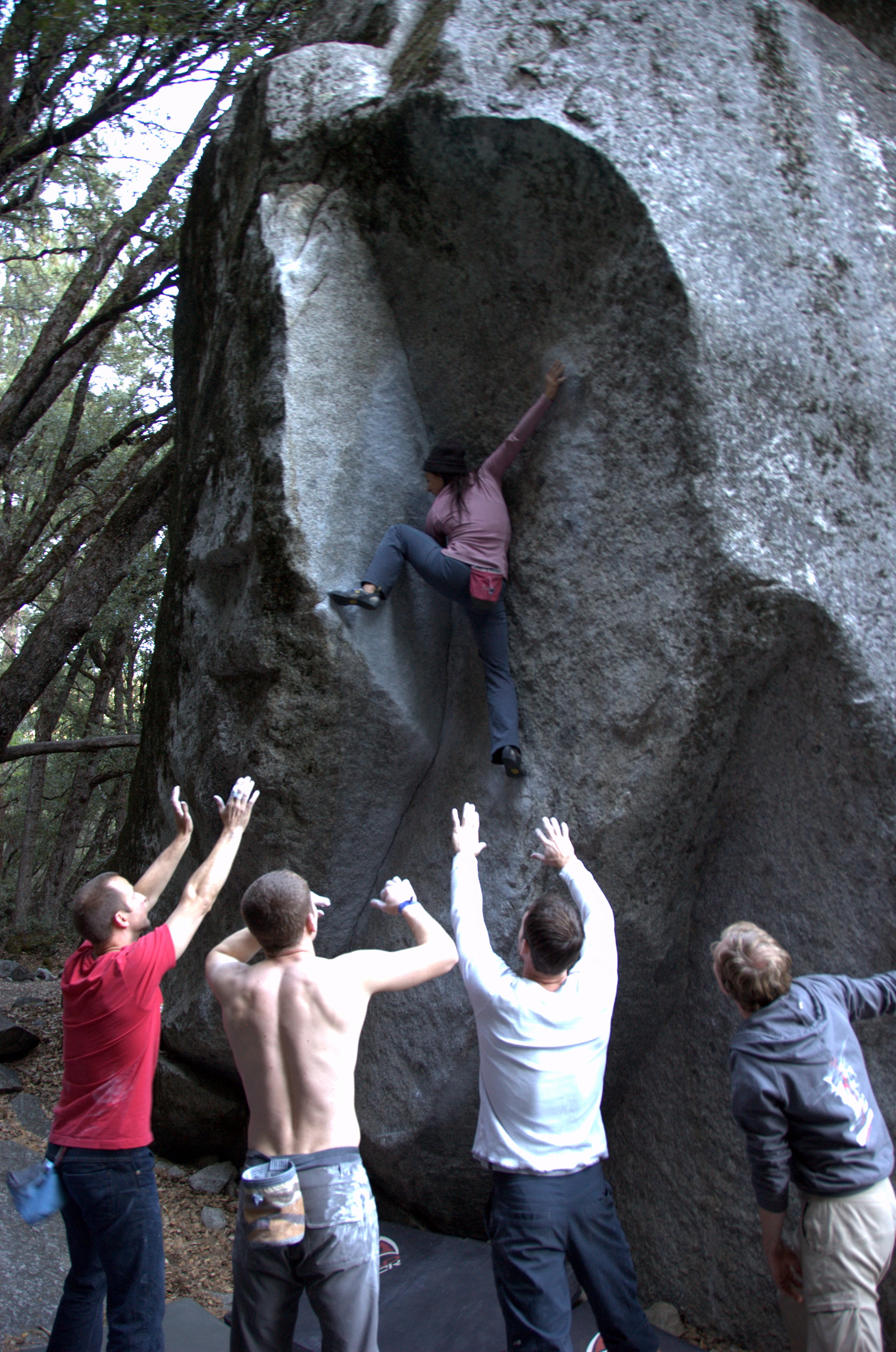
Hill made the first female ascent of Yosemite's King Cobra in 1998. (Others pictured)

- 1979, Ophir Broke II 5.12d, Telluride, Colorado − First free ascent and first-ever female ascent in history of a 5.12d (7c), with John Long
- 1979, Pea Brain 5.12d, Independence Pass, Colorado − First free ascent with John Long
- 1979, Stairway to Heaven III 5.12, Tahquitz Peak, California − First free ascent, with John Long and Tim Powell
- 1980, Coatamundi Whiteout II 5.12, Granite Mountain, Arizona − First free ascent, with John Long and Keith Cunning
- 1981, Hidden Arch 5.12a, Joshua Tree, California − First free ascent
- 1981, Levitation 29 IV 5.11a, Red Rock, Nevada − First free ascent, with John Long and Jorge and Joanne Urioste
- 1982, Blue Nubian 5.11, Joshua Tree, California − First free ascent
- 1984, Yellow Crack 5.12R/X, Shawangunks − First free ascent
- 1984, Vandals, 5.13a, Shawangunks − First ascent, and first-ever female ascent in history of a 5.13b (8a)
- 1984, Organic Iron 5.12c, Shawangunks − First ascent
- 1985, Organic Iron 5.12c, Shawangunks − First free ascent, with Russ Raffa
- 1987, Girls Just Want to Have Fun 5.12 X, Shawangunks − First free ascent
- 1988, The Greatest Show on Earth 5.12d, New River Gorge, West Virginia − First free ascent
- 1989, Running Man 5.13d, Shawangunks − First free ascent
- 1990, Masse Critique 5.14a, Cimaï, France, − First-ever female redpoint in history of a 5.14a (8b+)
- 1992, Simon 5.13b, Frankenjura, Germany − First-ever female onsight in history of a 5.13b (8a)
- 1993, The Nose 5.14a/b, El Capitan, Yosemite − First to free climb with partner Brooke Sandahl
- 1994, Mingus V 5.13a, 12 pitches, Verdon Gorge, France − First free ascent, onsight
- 1994, The Nose 5.14a/b, El Capitan, Yosemite − First free ascent
- 1995, Clodhopper Direct IV 5.10+, Central Pyramid, Kyrgyzstan − First ascent, with Greg Child
- 1995, Perestroika Crack V 5.12b, Peak Slesova, Kyrgyzstan − First free ascent, with Greg Child
- 1995, West Face V 5.12b, Peak 4810, Kyrgyzstan − First free ascent, with Alex Lowe
- 1997, Tete de Chou 5.13a, Todra Gorge, Morocco − First ascent
- 1998, Midnight Lightning V8 (7B/7B+), Camp 4, Yosemite − First female ascent of a famous American boulder.
- 1998, King Cobra V8 (7B/7B+), Camp 4, Yosemite − First female ascent
- 1998, To Bolt or Not to Be 5.14a, Smith Rocks, Oregon − First female ascent
- 1999, Scarface 5.14a, Smith Rocks, Oregon − First female ascent
- 1999, Bravo les Filles VI 5.13d A0, 13 pitches, Tsaranoro Massif, Madagascar − First ascent, with Nancy Feagin, Kath Pyke, and Beth Rodden
- 2004, Viva la Liberdad 5.12b, Vinales, Cuba − First ascent
- 2004, Sprayathon 5.13c, Rifle, Colorado − First female ascent
- 2005, West Face, Leaning Tower, V 5.13b/c, Yosemite − First female free ascent, with Katie Brown

== Competitions ==
- 1986, Grand-Prix d'Escalade, Troubat, winner
- 1987, Rock Master, Arco, Italy, winner
- 1987, World Indoor Rock Climbing Premier, winner, Grenoble, France
- 1988, Rock Master, Arco, Italy, winner
- 1988, International Climbing competition, winner, Marseille, France
- 1988, Masters Competition, winner, Paris, France
- 1989, Rock Master, Arco, Italy, winner
- 1989, Masters Competition, winner, Paris, France
- 1989, German Free Climbing Championships, winner
- 1989, International Climbing competition, winner
- 1989, World Cup, winner, Lyon, France
- 1990, Rock Master, Arco, Italy, winner
- 1990, World Cup, winner (tied with Isabelle Patissier from France), Lyon, France
- 1990, International Climbing competition, winner
- 1992, Rock Master, Arco, Italy, winner

== Awards ==
- 1984 – American Alpine Club Underhill Award
- 2026 – American Alpine Club Presidents' Gold Medal

== Filmography ==
- First Ascent (1982)
- Bambous (1987)
- Moving Over Stone (1988)
- Moving Over Stone II (1991)
- Climb (1991)
- Psycho Anthropologist (1992)
- The New Spider Man (1993)
- La maîtresse du vide (1994)
- Sea Kayaking (1995)
- Rock (1996)
- Vietnam - Into the Dragon's Teeth (1997)
- Free Climbing the Nose (1997)
- Pabbay - Outer Hebrides (1998)
- L'arte di arrampicare (1998)
- Extreme Summer (1999)
- Extreme (1999)
- Big Stone (1999)
- Yosemite - Ascending Rhythm (2000)
- Beyond Gravity (2000)
- Madagascar - A woman's first ascent (2000)
- Vertical Frontier (2002)
- The Center of the Universe (2003)
- Pro Tips - Volume 1 (2003)
- Petzl Roctrip Millau 2004 (2004)
- Petzl Roctrip Squamish 2005 (2005)
- Wall Rats (2006)
- First Ascent (2006)
- Petzl Roctrip Millau 2006 (2006)
- Petzl Roctrip Zillertal 2008 (2008)
- Progression (2009)
- Petzl Roctrip Jonte 2009 (2009)
- Rocky Mountain Highball (2010)
- Climbing World Cup in Arco, Italy (2011)
- Origins - Obe & Ashima (2011)
- The Fanatic Search 2 - A Girl Thing... (2011)
- Outside the Box (2011)
- Petzl Roctrip China 2011 (2011)
- Best of EOFT No. 8 (2012)
- Stoney Point (2012)
- The Network (2012)
- Reel Rock S1 E1: La Dura Dura (2012)
- Valley Uprising (2014)
- Jeff Lowe's Metanoia (2014)
- Wild New Brave (2014)
- Climbing the Nose (2015)
- Reel Rock S3 E5: Young Guns (2016)
- Reel Rock S4 E1: Break on Through (2017)
- Fine Lines (2018)
- Hip Hop Gone Wild (2018)
- Legends (2018)
- Liv Along the Way (2018)
- A Thousand Ways to Kiss the Ground (2020)
- The Rapture of Free Soloing on Acid (2020)
- Here to Climb (2024)

== See also ==
- List of grade milestones in rock climbing
- History of rock climbing
- Rankings of most career IFSC gold medals
- Valley Uprising — A documentary about the history of climbing in Yosemite Valley, prominently featuring Hill.
