= Climbing Free =

2002 book by Lynn Hill and Greg Child

- Author: Lynn Hill, Greg Child
- Genre: Autobiography
- Publisher: W. W. Norton & Company
- Publication date: 2002

Climbing Free: My Life in the Vertical World is an autobiography written by American rock climber Lynn Hill. Co-written with mountaineer and writer Greg Child, it was published in 2002 by W.W. Norton & Company.

Hill describes the writing process with Child as collaborative: "He would take my writings and organize them, and he encouraged me to elaborate on certain elements. He emphasized that telling the story is what's important, so he really helped me think about what I wanted to say, and figure out who my audience was." Hill explained in an interview that writing about past events was easier because she had had time to reflect on them. She wanted to "convey the history and culture of free climbing", specifically how it became as specialized as it is today. She felt that she had a unique perspective to offer, both as someone who climbed at a particular moment in climbing history and as a woman: "And I wonder if a male writer would have presented that information differently. I think the book is important from that stand point, because I am a woman, and there are not many female viewpoints on climbing, or the history of climbing, out there." Writing about climbing in the 1970s, 1980s, and 1990s was dominated by men. As accomplished American climber and writer Rachel de Silva explains, the six major American climbing magazines published fewer than 12 articles a year by or about women during the 1980s despite women comprising 40% of climbers. It was not until 1990 that the first women-centric climbing books appeared.

== Reception ==
One review of the book described it as "more diary than memoir" and praises Hill's storytelling when recounting her adventurous climbs but contends that it ultimately fails due to a lack of editing. Too much personal detail about family and boyfriends is included. Publishers Weekly and Library Journal, on the other hand, found it entertaining and wrote glowingly of Hill's ability to narrate a good story.
