= Rosemary Saal =

American mountaineer

Rosemary Saal is an American mountaineer who at age 19 was a member of the first all African American climbing team to climb Denali in 2013. At age 25 she was the technical co-leaders for the first all-Black U.S. expedition team to summit Mount Kilimanjaro, in 2018.

On May 12, 2022 she was part of the first all-Black U.S. expedition team to summit Mount Everest.

== Biography ==
Saal was born in Seattle, WA. Saal started climbing at age 12 at Smith Rock State Park in Oregon, after joining Passages Northwest (now GOLD – Girls Outdoor Leadership Development). Saal is a graduate of NOLS (National Outdoor Leadership School).

== Notable accomplishments ==
- Mt. Everest Summit with Full Circle, first all-black Everest expedition. 2022
- Co-Technical Leader of First all-Black U.S. expedition team to summit Mount Kilimanjaro. 2018
- Member of First all African American team to climb Denali. 2013

== Advocacy ==
Saal actively advocates for breaking down racial barriers in the outdoor community by volunteering for the GOLD program, and using her climbs to raise awareness for minorities accessing the outdoors. Rosemary Saal told the Washington Post, "There’s been an intentional lack of access for black people. When Hillary first summited [Everest], black people couldn’t even vote in this country."

== Accolades ==
- Named Backpacker Magazine Heroes of the Year 2014

== Filmography ==
- Expedition Denali (2014, Outside TV)
- An American Ascent (2016, 66 minutes, George Potter & Andy Adkins)
