= Over the Edge (book) =

2002 book by Greg Child

- Author: Greg Child
- Cover artist: Barbara M. Bachman
- Language: English
- Genre: non-fiction
- Publisher: Villard Books/Random House, Inc.
- Publication date: 2002
- Publication place: United States
- Pages: 284
- ISBN: 0-375-50609-8
- OCLC: 49390841
- Dewey Decimal: 958.43/082/0922 21
- LC Class: HV6604.K97 C55 2002

Over the Edge (2002) is a non-fiction book by American author Greg Child, chronicling the 2000 kidnapping of mountain climbers Beth Rodden, Tommy Caldwell, Jason "Singer" Smith, and John Dickey by Islamic guerrilla fighters in the mountains of Kyrgyzstan.

Publishers Weekly critiqued the book for its "flat" storytelling, noting that despite Child's access to the climbers and his own regional experience, the narrative lacked the engaging qualities of other adventure writers like Jon Krakauer. The review highlighted issues with "wooden" dialogue and over-explanation of characters' motivations, suggesting that the book's pacing suffered as a result. In American Alpine Journal, David Hale wrote "it is an incredible story, and Child does justice to the cool-headed heroism of all four Americans." A review in the Washington Post is critical of Child's financial agreement with the climbers — which it calls "checkbook journalism" — and his treatment of rival journalist John Bouchard.
