= Skull Hollow =

Campground in Oregon, United States

- Interactive map of Skull Hollow
- Type: Campground
- Location: Central Oregon; around Deschutes County's northeastern border with Crook County
- Nearest city: Terrebonne (unincorporated community) Madras or Prineville (cities)
- Coordinates: 44.396115°N 121.065189°W
- Etymology: Human remains left over from the Snake War
- Operator: Aud & Di Campground Operations
- Open: March 15 – October 31
- Terrain: High Desert

Skull Hollow is a small campground in the Ochoco National Forest & Crooked River National Grassland. It is located in Central Oregon east of Terrebonne, Oregon and often used as a campground for people who are visiting Smith Rock State Park.

== History ==
Skull Hollow is named after the number of human skulls found in the area. The skulls were found as part of a massacre between settlers and Native Americans in the area under the leadership of Chief Paulina in the winter of 1864. Soldiers found the remains of some 200 people, 40 burned-out wagons and the personal effects of those murdered.

== Geography ==
Skull Hollow is a High Desert area. It is 3,120 feet above sea level.

== Camping ==
It is a campground with limited amenities and has 76 spots for cars and tents with a $15/night charge single sites $30/night double sites, $7/night extra vehicles per night. Amenities include tent camping, camping trailer, picnic tables, fire pits, toilets, parking, and cycling accessibility no potable water onsite but the hosts sell wood. Or you can get potable water at nearby Smith Rock or Haystack campground.

== Hiking ==
There is the Skull Hollow Trailhead located at the campground. The trailhead is northwest of the campground on Forest Service Road 5710. The trail gives access to the Cole Loop Trail. This trail junctions with the Warner Loop Trail and, further on, the Gray Butte Trail. During the spring and later fall, the Gray Butte Trail can become muddy to the point of impassable for hikers and mountain bikers.
