= Chris Noble =

Chris Noble may refer to:

- Chris Noble, former chief constable of Staffordshire Police, who resigned before he was dismissed in 2026
- Chris Noble, contestant in Survivor: Ghost Island in 2018
- Christopher Noble (1902–1986), English surveyor
