= Greg Child =

Australian mountain climber

Greg Child (born 12 April 1957) is an Australian-born rock climber, mountaineer and author.

He has authored several books: Thin Air: Encounters in the Himalayas, Mixed Emotions: Mountaineering Writings of Greg Child, Postcards from the Ledge, Over the Edge and Climbing Free (co-authored with Lynn Hill), and has written numerous magazine articles for "Outside", "Climbing", "Rock and Ice" and "Men's Journal".

In 1987, Child was honoured with the American Alpine Club's Literary Award for his prolific and insightful mountaineering literature. In 2011 Child was president of the jury for mountaineering's coveted Piolet d'Or.

== Notable ascents ==
- 1981 Aurora, (VI 5.8 A5, 900m), El Capitan, Yosemite Valley, USA. FA with Peter Mayfield.
- 1985 Lost in America, (VI 5.9 A5, 900m), El Capitan, Yosemite Valley, USA. FA with Randy Leavitt.
- 1986 Northwest Ridge, Gasherbrum IV, Karakoram. FA of the Northwest Ridge (second ascent of Gash IV) with Tim Macartney-Snape and Tom Hargis.
- 1990 K2 successful climb with Steve Swenson and Greg Mortimer and others, per lecture and slides at Harvard Traveler's Club, 21 May 2013
- 1992 Run for Cover, (VII 5.11 A3, 1000m), Trango Tower, Karakoram, Pakistan. FA with Mark Wilford.
- 1994 Belligerence, (VI 5.11 A3+ 1200m), Mount Combatant, Coast Mountains (B.C. Canada). FA with Greg Collum and Steve Mascioli.
- 1994 Wall of Shadows, (Alaska Grade 6, AI6+ 5.9 A4), Mount Hunter, Alaska Range Alaska, USA. FA with Michael Kennedy.

== Writings ==
- 1987: Child, Greg (1987). "Gasherbrum IV's Northwest Ridge". American Alpine Journal. 29 (61). New York, NY, US: American Alpine Club: 17–25. ISBN 0-930410-29-7.
- 1987: Child, Greg (1987). "Lost in America". American Alpine Journal. 29 (61). New York, NY, US: American Alpine Club: 60–69. ISBN 0-930410-29-7.
- 1988: Thin Air: Encounters in the Himalaya, Mountaineers Books, Seattle, WA, USA. 1988 ISBN 1-85260-045-4, ISBN 978-1-85260-045-7
- 1993: Mixed Emotions: Mountaineering Writings, Mountaineers Books, Seattle, WA, USA. 1993 ISBN 0-89886-363-5
- 1998: Postcards from the Ledge, Mountaineers Books, Seattle, WA, USA. 1998 ISBN 0-89886-584-0 (Winner National Outdoor Book Award, Outdoor Literature, 1998)
- 2002: Over the Edge, Villard Books (Random House), New York, New York, USA. 2002 ISBN 0-375-50609-8
