= Smith Rock State Park =

State park in Oregon, United States

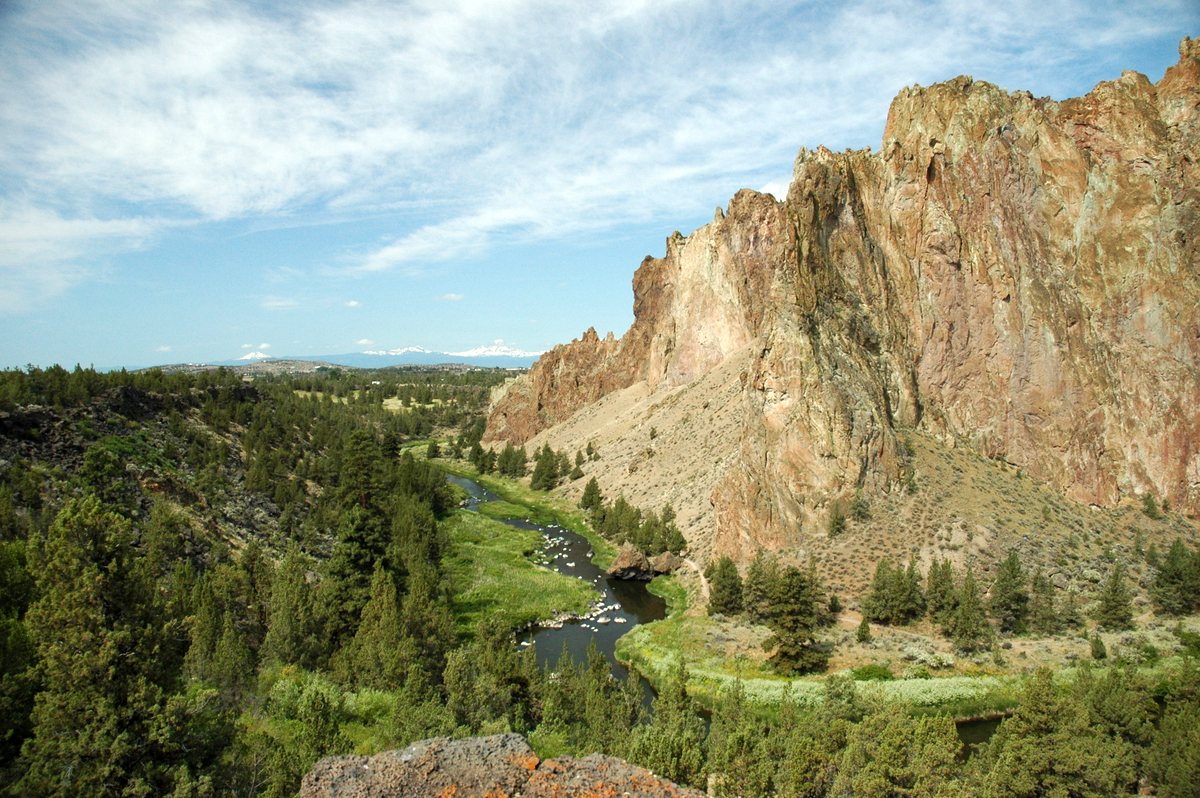

- Location within Oregon Location within the United States
- Type: Public, state
- Location: Deschutes County, Oregon
- Nearest city: Redmond
- Coordinates: 44°22′09″N 121°08′18″W
- Area: 641 acres (259 ha)
- Operator: Oregon Parks and Recreation Department
- Open: year round
- Status: open
- Website: Official website

Smith Rock State Park is a state park located in central Oregon's High Desert near the communities of Redmond and Terrebonne. The day-use area of the park is open daily from dawn to dusk. The park also has a camping area as well that accommodates tent camping only. Its sheer cliffs of tuff and basalt are ideal for rock climbing of all difficulty levels. Smith Rock is generally considered the birthplace of modern American sport climbing, and is host to cutting-edge climbing routes. It is popular for sport climbing, traditional climbing, multi-pitch climbing, and bouldering.

== History ==
The origin of the Smith Rock name is uncertain. One story, published in the Albany States Rights Democrat in 1867 A.D., states that Smith Rock was named after John Smith, who was Linn County Sheriff and an Oregon state legislator in the 1850s and 1860s. The newspaper article credits Smith with "discovering" the rock. Another story claims the rock was named after a soldier named Smith who fell to his death from the rock in 1863 while his unit was camped nearby.

The State of Oregon obtained the park property between 1960 and 1975 from the City of Redmond and Harry and Diane Kem.

== Geology ==
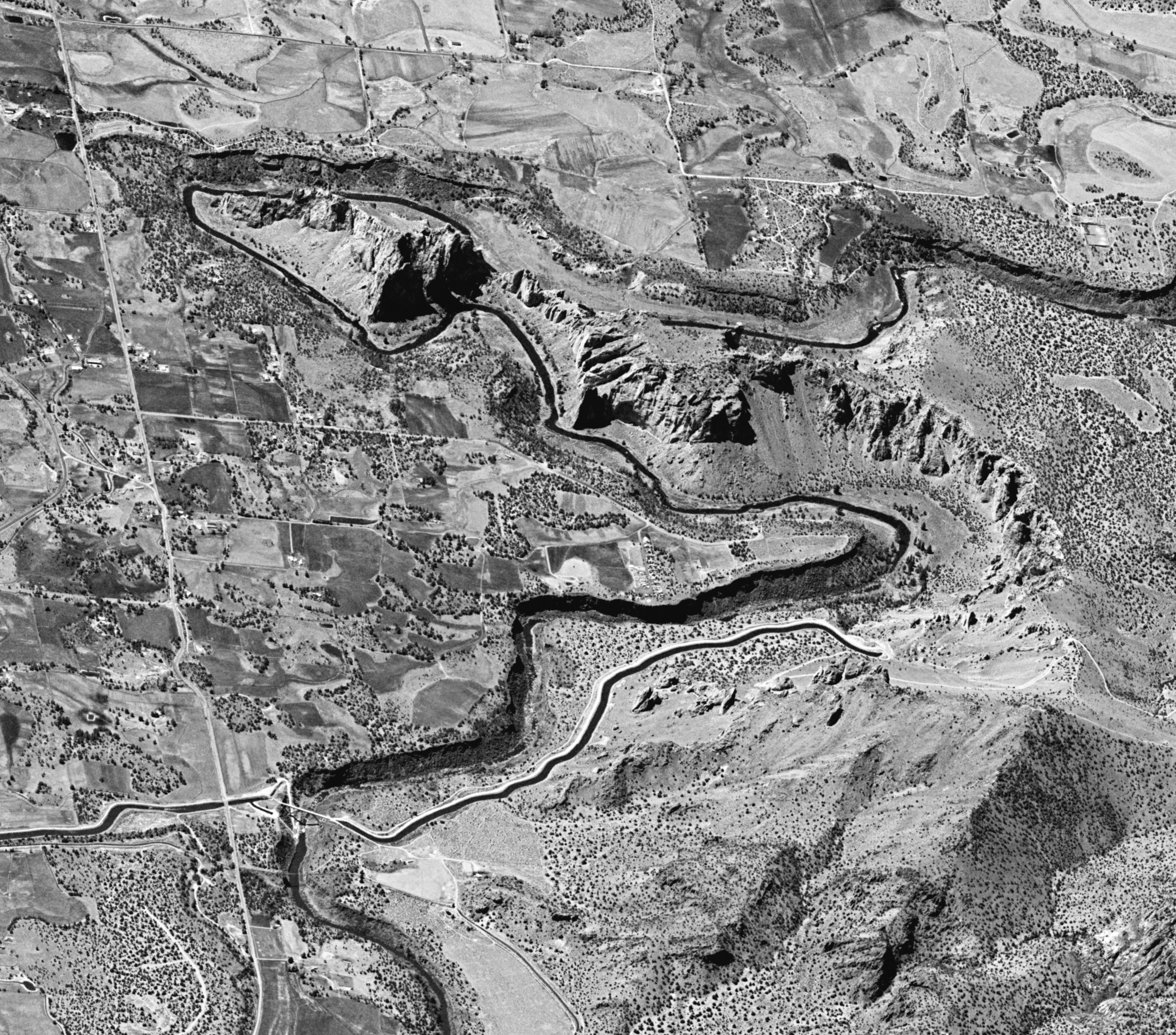
Smith Rock State Park viewed from space in 1973

The geology of Smith Rocks is volcanic. It is made up of layers of recent basalt flows overlaying older Clarno ash and tuff formations. Approximately 30 million years ago, a large caldera was formed (Crooked River caldera) when overlying rock collapsed into an underground magma chamber. This created a huge amount of rock and ash debris that filled the caldera. That material solidified into rock, becoming the rhyolite tuff of Smith Rock. Rhyolite dikes intruded along faults in the tuff. A half million years ago, basalt lava flows from nearby volcanoes covered the older tuff.

More recently, the Crooked River cut its way through the layers of rock to create today's geographic features. Smith Rock itself is a 3,200-foot (980 m)-high ridge (above sea level) with a sheer cliff-face overlooking a bend in the Crooked River (elev. 2,600 ft = 792.5 m), making the cliffs about 600 feet (182.9 meters) high.

== Wildlife ==
There is abundant wildlife in and around the park. Mule deer and many small mammals are common in the park. River otter and beaver are found along the park's Crooked River frontage. The Smith Rock area hosts many types of songbirds, like the canyon wren and the white-throated swift. Visitors can also expect to see birds of prey, such as prairie falcons and golden eagles. Geese and ducks nest along the river in the springtime. There are rattlesnakes in some areas of the park.

== Recreation ==
=== Hiking ===
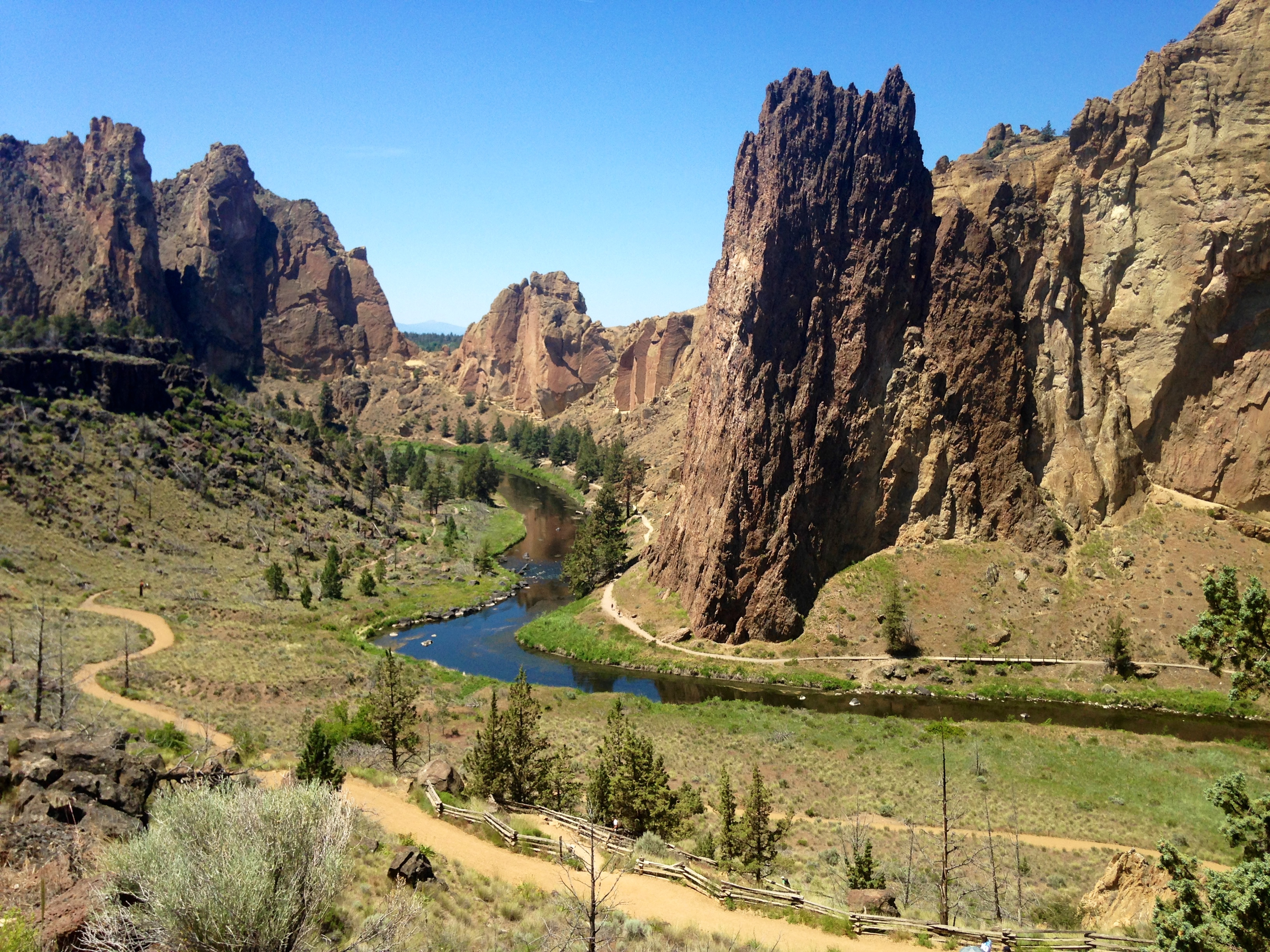
The Crooked River running through Smith Rock

The park has many miles of developed trails for hiking. The trails have viewpoints along the routes that overlook the Crooked River and nearby rock formations. The two main trails are the Summit Trail and Misery Ridge. The park's trail network links to neighboring Forest Service and Bureau of Land Management trails on adjacent public lands. The soil and native vegetation on the steep hillsides in the park are very sensitive to damage, so visitors are required to stay on established trails.

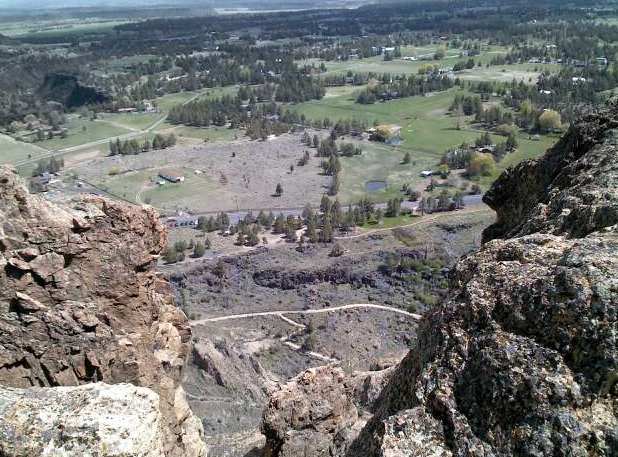
Taken from the top of Smith Rock looking towards Terrebonne.

=== Climbing ===
The park contains the first U.S. climb rated 5.14 (8c/+). The area is well known for its challenging climbing routes and attracts high-level climbers. In 1983, Alan Watts began to use sport climbing ethics, which pushed American climbing to new levels. Shortly after, between 1992 and 2009, about 500 new climbing routes were added. This brought climbers from all over the world as Smith Rock became the world capital for sport climbing. To this day, the park still attracts climbers from around the globe. The winter weather is typically cold (below freezing), but climbers still make the journey due to the reduced traffic on routes. Summer months regularly reach the 100s °F (40s °C). Some climbing routes are closed periodically for the protection of nesting birds of prey.

Smith Rock State Park has more than 1,800 rock climbing routes as of 2010. The park is broken up into walls and have names commonly used by the climbing community.

==== Christian Brothers ====
The Christian Brothers area is a large group of rock spires in between Asterisk Pass and The Dihedrals. The walls that make up the Christian Brothers area are the Prophet Wall, The Beard, Testament Slab and the Combination Blocks. There are several routes in this area that are noteworthy such as Wartley's Revenge (5.11b Trad), Revelations (5.9 Sport) with its high first bolt off the ground, Double Trouble (5.10b Sport), BBQ the Pope (5.10b Sport), Heresy (5.11c Sport), Rude Boys (5.13c Sport), and Scarface and Chemical Ali (both 5.14a Sport).

==== The Dihedrals ====
The Dihedrals are located between the Four Horseman and Asterisk Pass just past the Morning Glory Wall. It is one of the more popular areas to climb in the park with easy classics like Cinnamon Slab (5.6 Trad, 2 Pitch), Bunny Face (5.7 Sport). It has some more moderate climbs such as Moonshine Dihedral (5.9 Trad, 2 Pitch) and Karate Crack (5.10a Trad) as well some of the more difficult climbs such as Heinous Cling (5.12c Sport), Chain Reaction (5.12c Sport) and To Bolt or Not to Be (5.14a Sport).

==== The Upper and Lower Gorge ====
The Gorge contains more climbs that are Traditional Routes rather than Sport Routes. Climbers also need to be fairly stout climbers as most routes start in the low 5.12's. The rock is mainly basalt, fairly different from the welded tuff you find in most of the other climbing areas in Smith Rock State Park. The lower gorge is a location to get away from the heat of the late spring, summer and early fall.

==== The Marsupials ====
The Marsupials are the farthest climbing area from the main entrance of the park. To get there, go across the bridge and turn right on Wolf Tree Trail. Follow this around the canyon following the Crooked River and turn up Burma Road. The beginning of the Marsupials starts just off Burma Road. The three main areas in the Marsupials are Koala Rock, The Wombat and Brogan Spire.

Famed climber Beth Rodden made the first ascent of The Optimist (5.14b Sport) located on the "Koala Rock" side of the Marsupials.

==== Monkey Face Area ====
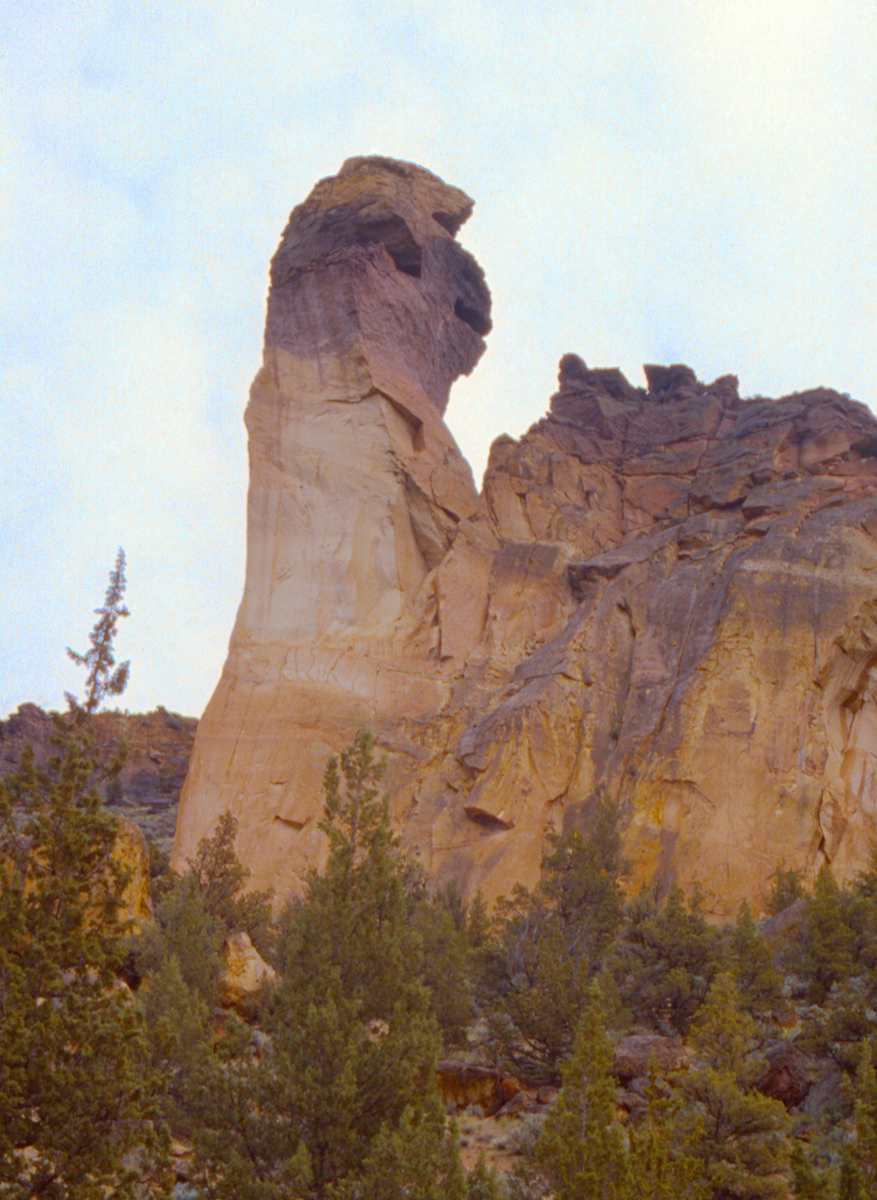
Monkey Face in profile

The Monkey Face area has many routes, but is known for the iconic rock spire known as "Monkey Face", a distinctly primate looking face when viewed from a certain angle. This iconic tower is 350 feet (106.7 meters) tall and boasts many routes. One of the more famous routes, Just Do It (5.14c), is still a testpiece for climbers to prove their prowess.

Directly across from the "mouth" of Monkey Face is a prominent rock outcropping (The Diving Board) that comes fairly close to the tower. There is tyrolean traverse gear nailed down on the outcropping and within the "mouth" of Monkey Face. Adventurous climbers can connect these with 1" nylon webbing and create a "slackline" between the two locations, which can be traversed via a tethered safety line.

==== Morning Glory Wall ====
The Morning Glory Wall sits in just past the Shiprock and is one of the busier walls in the park. It boasts routes of all levels. Because of its location, it is very hot in the late morning and afternoons during the warmer seasons. The Morning Glory Wall has a wide range of climbs but some of the more notable routes are 5 Gallon Buckets (5.8), Light on the Path (5.10a), Cool Ranch Flavor (5.11b), Magic Light (5.11b), Zebra Seam (5.11d), Churning in the Wake (5.13a) and Vicious Fish (5.13c).

==== Picnic Lunch Wall ====
The Picnic Lunch Wall is generally the first image of Smith Rock State Park that most visitors get. It is 700 feet tall and has climbing routes, many multi-pitch routes that have loose rock. It is also the beginning of the Misery Ridge, Wolf Tree, and River Trails and generally gets heavy hiking traffic.

==== Red Wall ====
The Red Wall is located off the Misery Ridge Trail just past the Picnic Lunch Wall. The rock has a red to purple color from the iron in the rock, making it distinct from most of the welded tuff in the park. It has some classic, easy multi-pitch trad climbs with Superslab (5.6 trad, 3 pitches), Moscow (5.6 trad, 3 pitches with one 4th class scramble at the top) and Peking (5.8 trad, 3 pitches). Because it is an east-facing wall, it receives direct sunlight in the early morning and shade in the afternoon and evening.

==== Rope-de-Dope ====
The Rope-De-Dope block sits across the Crooked River across from the main climbing areas such as The Morning Glory Wall. The trail to Rope-De-Dope is the gravel Canyon Trail and goes north before you walk across the main bridge into the park. If you are starting from The Bivy, take the Rope-de-Dope Trail that comes around the back of the block. The Rope-De-Dope Block is a common place for beginners to be able to top-rope or learn how to lead climb on easier routes. The routes on Rope-De-Dope are shorter than almost all of the other routes in the park due to the block only being 40 feet high. Top ropes can be set up from a small scramble up the back of the block to get to the top anchors.

==== Ships and Gullies ====
The Ships and Gullies area is a collection of smaller, in-the-shade areas that have a range of climbing difficulties. This area contains Aggro Gully, Cocaine Gully, Honeycomb Wall, Shipwreck Wall, Table Scraps Wall, and West Ship River Face. The Ships and Gullies area starts less than a quarter of a mile past the Picnic Lunch Wall after Shiprock where you can see the first set of stairs up the trail to the gullies.

==== Smith Rock Groups ====
The Smith Rock Groups cover a large swath of the climbing park stretching from Asterisk Pass to the southern border of the park. Generally, these can be areas to get away from the crowds and the sun. The Smith Rock Group has a lot of varied climbing but mostly sport with a couple of options for multi-pitch. Some of the more popular routes are Sky Ridge (5.8 trad, 3 pitches), Sunset Slab (5.9 sport), White Satin (5.9 trad, 3 pitches), Wherever I May Roam (5.9 sport, 5 pitches), Phoenix (5.10a sport), Kunza Korner (5.10c sport), American Nirvana (5.11c sport), and Blackened (5.11c/d).

==== West Side Crags ====
The West Side Crags offer a much cooler side of the park in the summer and a break from the normally fairly crowded sections of the park. There are three ways to get to the West Side Crags depending upon how much hiking/scrambling you are willing to do. The most direct route is to hike to Asterisk Pass from the main trail into the park just west of The Christian Brothers area. It is a scramble to get into the slot and then it is a 5.7R down-climb from the other side of the path to the west side of the park. This can be dangerous if done without climbing equipment and experience. The West Side Crags can also be accessed from either hiking up Misery Ridge and access the crags after coming down the switchbacks at Monkey Face or take the longer River Trail around the southern tip and then walk up to the crags. The West Side Crags are composed of Snake Rock, Angel Flight Crags, Spiderman Buttress, Mesa Verda Wall and the Pleasure Palace.

=== Camping ===
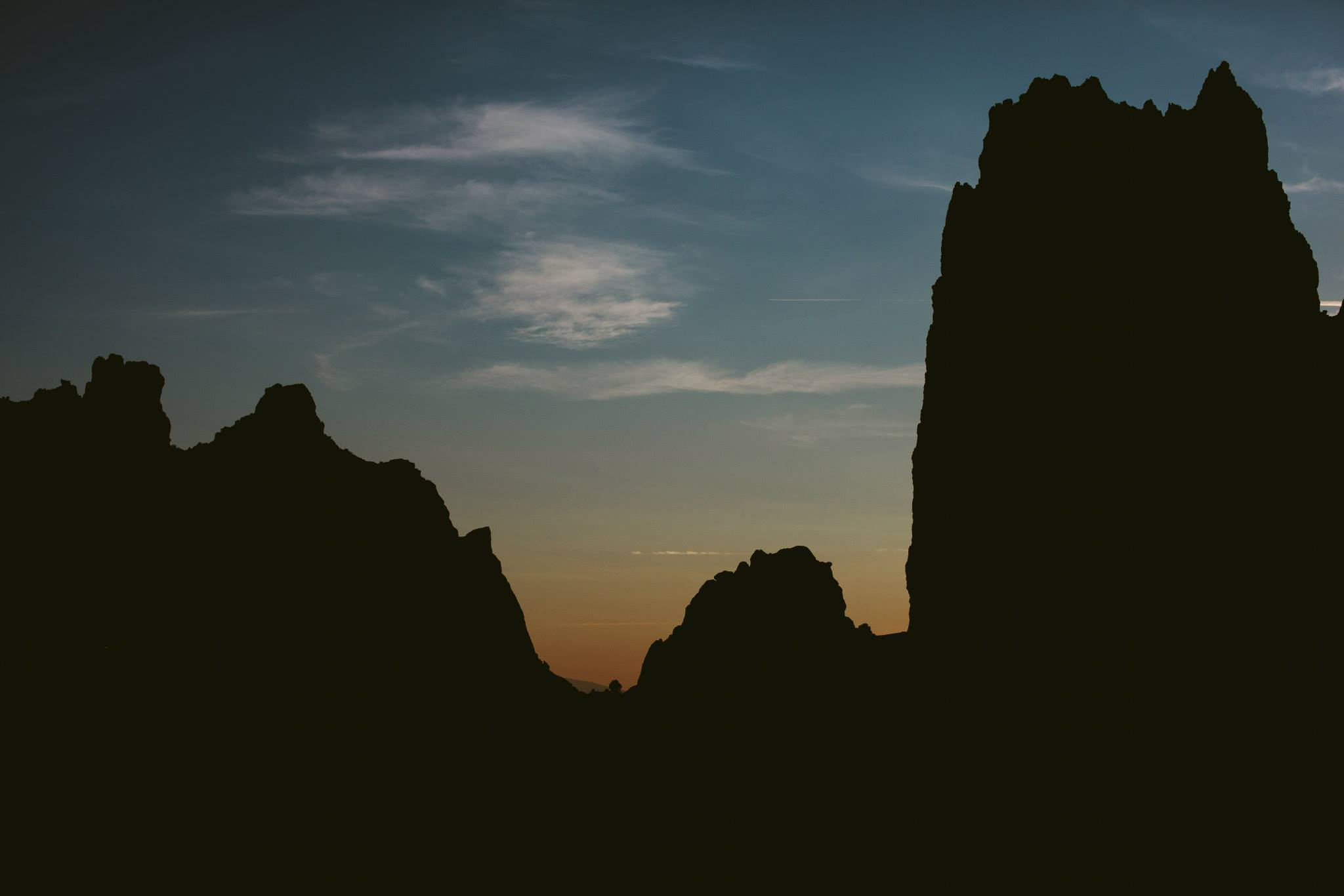
Smith Rock silhouetted at sunset

The park's day-use area has a visitor center, picnic facilities, and restrooms. The day-use area is open from dawn to dusk year-round. There is also a tent-only campground for overnight visitors. The campsites are located approximately 600 feet (180 m) from a parking area along the park's main access road. Restrooms, showers, and a cooking area are located near the parking area. Open fires are not permitted. Many of the state park campers will stay at Skull Hollow, a nearby BLM camp ground.

=== Running ===
Smith Rock State Park is home to some trail running races. The races include distances ranging from 4 miles to 50 miles (6.4 to 80.5 kilometers), all on the challenging and hilly terrain of Smith Rock.

== Films ==
Smith Rock State Park has been a filming location for several films:

- Even Cowgirls Get the Blues (1993)
- Homeward Bound: The Incredible Journey (1993)
- The Postman (1997)
- Wild (2014)

== See also ==
- List of Oregon state parks
